= Ghimeș-Palanca Pass =

Mountain pass in Romania

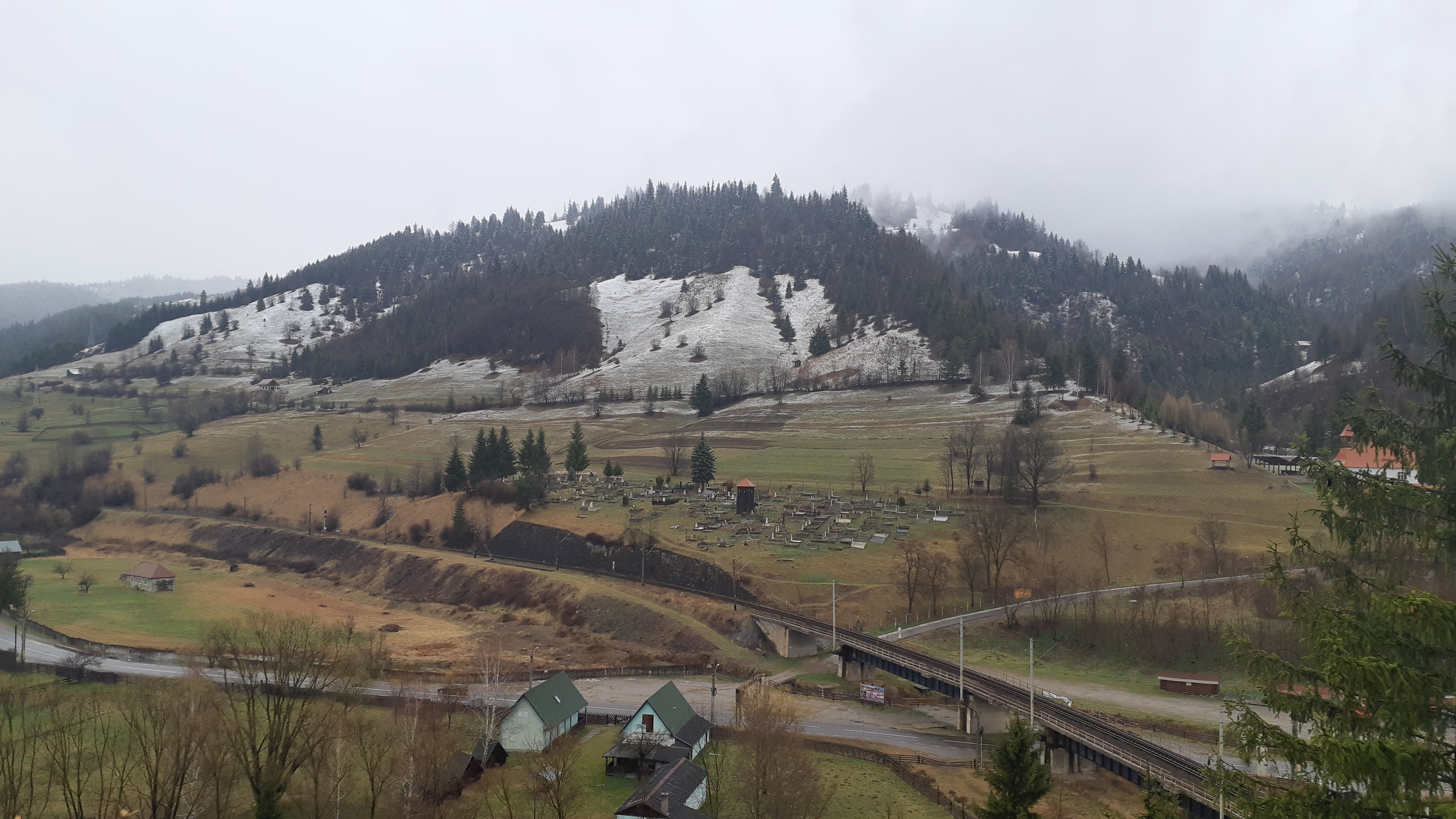

- Location within Romania
- Elevation: 684 metres (2,244 ft)
- Traversed by: DN12A

Third Approach
- Location: Romania
- Range: Tarcău Mountains, Ciuc Mountains
- Coordinates: 46°33′19″N 26°06′44″E

The Ghimeș-Palanca Pass (Hungarian: Gyimesi-szoros) is a mountain pass in the Eastern Carpathians of Romania, situated at an altitude of 684 m (2,244 ft) and located between the Tarcău Mountains to the northeast and the Ciuc Mountains to the southwest.

The Pass is traversed by national road DN12A, which connects Ghimeș and Palanca, in Bacău County. Parallel with the road runs the CFR railway line 501, which connects Adjud, Vrancea County to Siculeni, Harghita County.

== History ==
During World War I, there were sustained battles between Romanian and Austro-Hungarian forces for control of the Ghimeș-Palanca Pass. On August 27, 1916 — the day Romania entered the war on the side of the Allies — Romanian soldiers surprised the Austro-Hungarian troops stationed at the Ghimeș railway station, and quickly took control of the pass. Another battle occurred in October 1916, when the Romanian Fourth Army, under the command of Constantin Prezan, defeated the Austro-Hungarian 1st Army, under the command of Arthur Arz von Straußenburg.

In May 1917, Emil Rebreanu, an ethnic Romanian officer in the Austro-Hungarian Army, tried to cross the front near Ghimeș to the Romanian side. He was found and arrested by a patrol of imperial officers; tried by a military court on a charge of desertion and espionage, he was sentenced to death and executed by hanging. The protagonist in Forest of the Hanged, a 1922 novel by his brother Liviu Rebreanu, is influenced by his experience. In 2012, a monument in Emil Rebreanu's memory was unveiled at the border between Ghimeș-Făget and Palanca, around the place where the hanging is believed to have occurred.
