= Battle of the Eastern Carpathians =

Battle of the Northern Carpathians
- Part of the Romanian Campaign of World War I
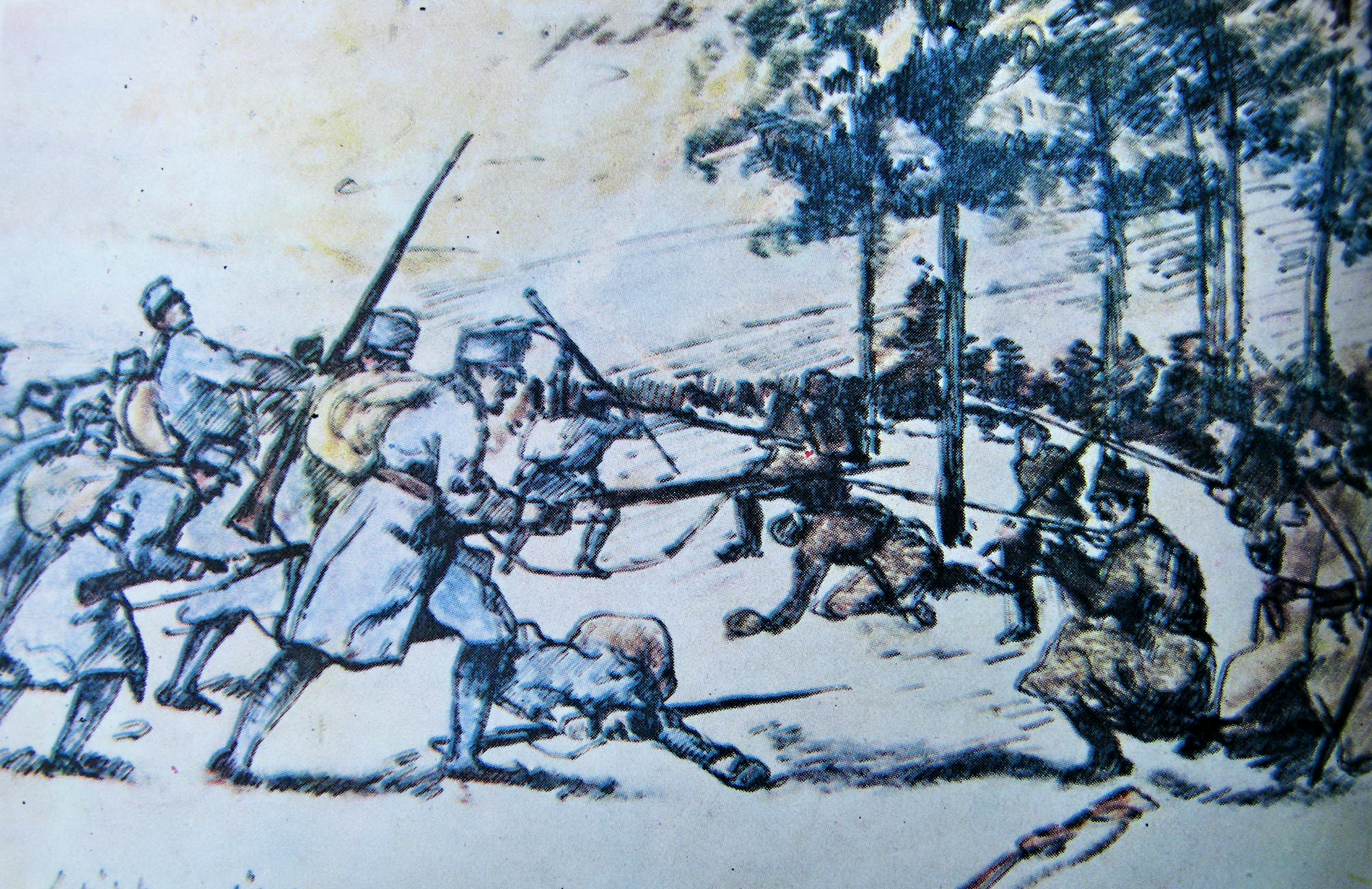
- Romanian soldiers repulsing an Austro-Hungarian attack
Date	13–29 October 1916
Location	Eastern Carpathians, on the border between Romania and Austria-Hungary
Result	Romanian victory

Belligerents
Romania	Austria-Hungary

Commanders and leaders
(Kingdom of Romania) Constantin Prezan (Kingdom of Romania) Ion Antonescu	(Austria-Hungary) Arthur Arz von Straussenburg

Units involved
Romanian North Army	1st Austro-Hungarian Army

Casualties and losses
Unknown	168 killed 635 wounded 802 missing 1,000 prisoners 12 guns

The Battle of the Eastern Carpathians consisted in a series of military engagements between Romanian and Austro-Hungarian forces during October 1916, in World War I. The attempt of the Austro-Hungarian 1st Army to break through the Eastern Carpathians was simultaneous with that of the German 9th Army to force the passes of the Southern Carpathians. Both efforts failed.

== Background ==
Having launched its invasion of northeast Transylvania in late August 1916, the undefeated Romanian Northern Army was ordered to withdraw, due to factors outside its control, such as setbacks on another army's front. The exhausted Austro-Hungarians under General Arthur Arz von Straußenburg moved slowly, giving the Romanians an uncontested run towards the border, where they settled into prepared defensive positions. The Romanian retreat started on 5 October and was carried out in the best order, with only negligible losses. General Arz sent his 72nd Division to the northern passes — Békás (Bicaz Gorge) and Tölgyes (Tulgheș) — with the VI Corps directed towards the southern ones — the 61st Division to Gyimes (Ghimeș) and the 39th Honvéd Division to Úzvölgye (Valea Uzului). The Austro-Hungarians crossed the Romanian border at Palanca in the Gyimes Pass (Ghimeș-Palanca Pass) region on 13 October.

Commanding the Northern Army was Constantin Prezan, a general who had studied in France. Prezan was, however, widely regarded as more of a courtier than a serious military officer. Fortunately for the Romanians, his operations officer was Captain Ion Antonescu, a "talented if prickly" individual.Such was the influence of Captain Antonescu that, in his memoirs, General Alexandru Averescu used the formula "Prezan (Antonescu)" to denote Prezan's plans and actions.

== Battle ==
In the Uz Pass, violent fighting began on 14 October. Positions were lost and gained, but overall the Romanians maintained themselves close to the border or even on the border itself, inflicting reverses and serious losses. By 26 October, the Honvéds had gained only a small insignificant portion of territory across the Romanian border. By 29 October, the 39th Honvéd Division had incurred casualties amounting to 146 killed, 553 wounded and 644 missing.

At Palanca, the Austro-Hungarian 61st Division made good initial progress. Palanca itself was conquered in two days of fighting (13 to 15 October), and by 17 October the village of Agăș, Bacău County, was reached, seven miles into Romanian territory. On the following day, the Austro-Hungarians attempted a further advance, but were counterattacked by the Romanians from two directions, and had to hastily retreat, the Romanian forces taking almost 1,000 prisoners and 12 guns. Aside from its losses at Agăș, by 29 October, the 61st Division had lost a further 22 killed, 82 wounded and 158 missing.

== Aftermath ==
By the beginning of November, the Romanian defense in the Carpathians had succeeded beyond expectation. The Central Powers had nowhere won the debouchments to the plains.

== Notes ==
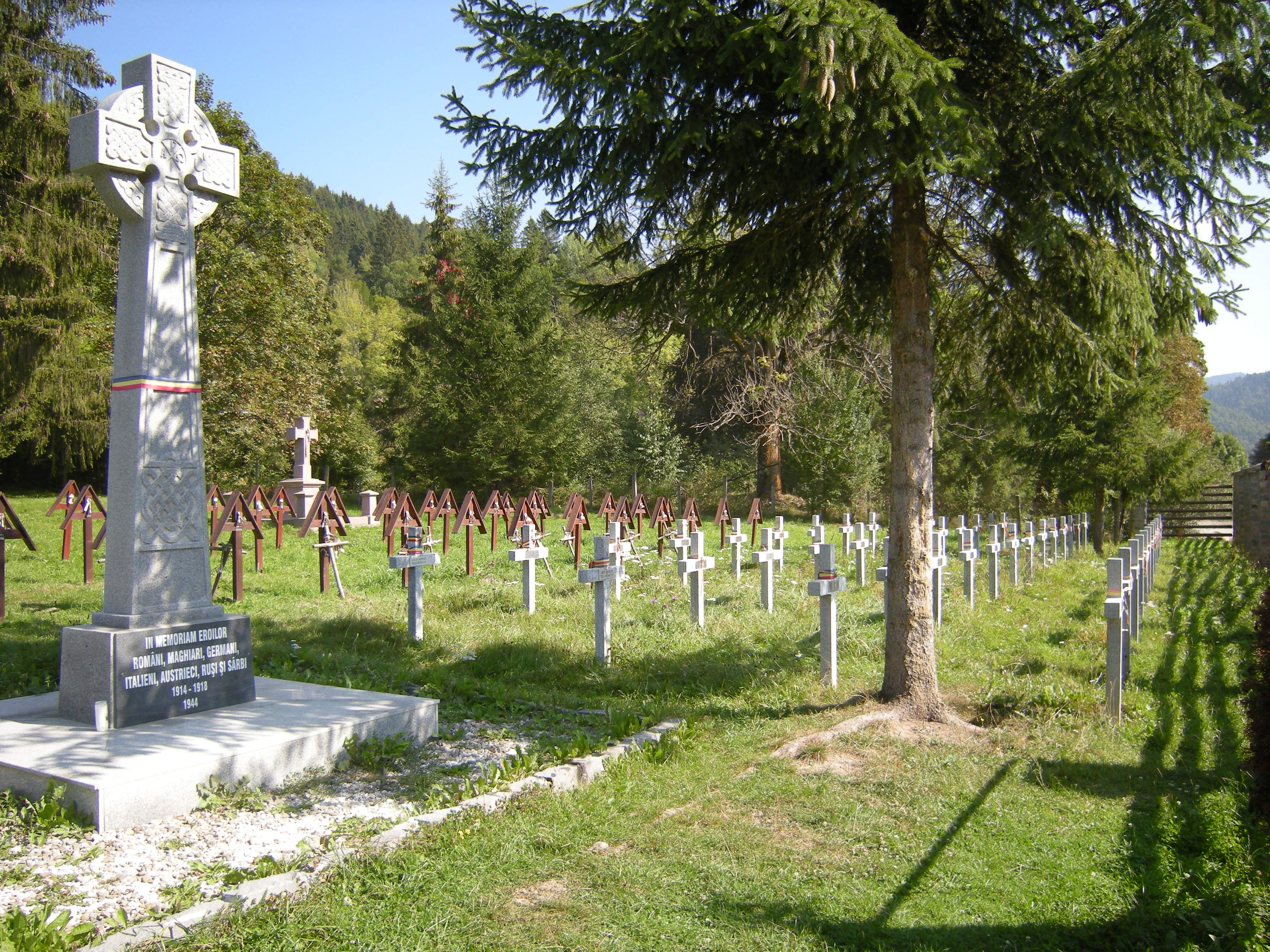
The Valea Uzului Heroes' Cemetery (Romanian side)

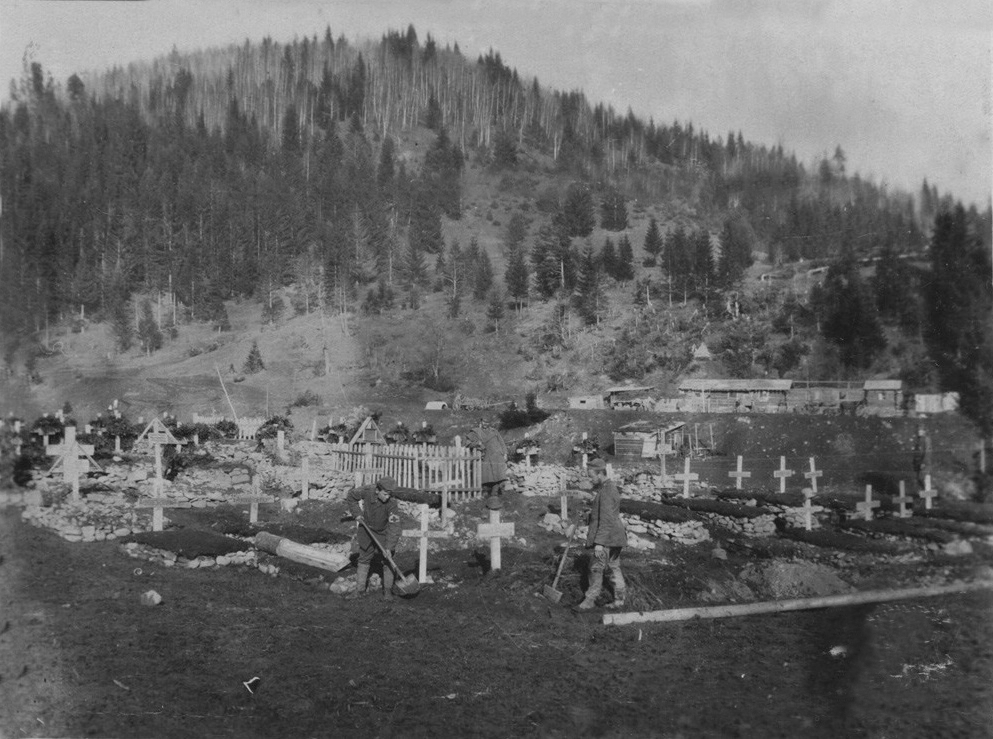
The Austro-Hungarian side of the cemetery, with German gravediggers (during World War I)
