= Nicolae Alevra =

Romanian general and politician (1871 - 1936)

- Born: January 21, 1871; Bogdănești, Baia County, Kingdom of Romania
- Died: July 16, 1936 (aged 65); Palanca, Bacău County, Kingdom of Romania
- Education: Higher War School

Minister of Communications
- In office 10 November 1928 – 15 October 1929
- Prime Minister: Iuliu Maniu
- Preceded by: Constantin Dimitriu-Dovlecel
- Succeeded by: Voicu Nițescu
- Military career
- Allegiance: Romanian Army
- Branch: Infantry
- Service years: 1892–1922
- Rank: Brigadier general
- Conflicts: World War I

Nicolae Alevra (21 January 1871, Bogdănești, Baia County, Romania – 16 July 1936, Palanca, Bacău County, Romania) was a Romanian brigadier general and politician who held was Minister of Communications in the first government of Iuliu Maniu.

Alevra's military education started at Școala Fiilor de Militari, in Iași, and in 1890 continued in Bucharest, where he graduated in 1892 from Școala militară de Artilerie (Artillery Military School) with the rank of second lieutenant. He studied at Graz, then at the Higher War School (1904–1906). He advanced in rank to captain (1902), major (1910), lieutenant colonel (1914), and colonel (1916).

Alevra served during World War I and was appointed in 1917 to brigadier general. He served as deputy chief of the General High Command, headed by General Constantin Prezan. In 1922 he withdrew from the army to dedicate himself to writing, in December 1927 becoming a member of the National Peasants' Party, which propelled him to serve as communications minister.

In that capacity, he went to the site of the railway accident at Boboc, where in April 1929 a derailed train caused the deaths of 20 people and injured a few dozen others.

He was a proponent of Romanian military doctrine and arts. He appreciated that the national military doctrine must be developed by affirming the principle of the "armed nation." Appreciating that after the achievement of the Great Union of Transylvania, Bessarabia, and Bukovina with the Kingdom of Romania in 1918, Romania would continue to have enemies, Alevra considered that the only war that could be accepted or envisaged was a defensive war. Alevra was elected to the Romanian Academy of Sciences on 21 December 1935.

== Works ==
- Necesitatea unei noi legi de recrutare – 1912
- Armata de rezervă – 1913
- Caracteristicile generale ale unora dintre instituțiile noastre militare – 1913
- Noi probleme de organizare – 1913
- Modificarea constituției și Armata – 1914
- Câteva observațiuni asupra unora dintre regulamentele noastre – 1915
- Stabilirea răspunderilor asupra pregătirii armatei pentru război – 1918
- Minoritățile și serviciul militar – 1924
- Opera Generalului Mărdărescu – 1925
- Birocrația în armată – 1927
- Legile militare – 1928
- Reducerea serviciului militar – 1928
- Organizarea armatei – 1930
- 'Oamenii politici și apărarea națională – 1931
- Noi concepte de organizare militară – 1934
- Omogenitatea armatei – 1936
- Problema effectivelor armatei – 1934
- Imponderabili la război. Studiu social militar – 1936
