= Emil Rebreanu =

Austro-Hungarian Romanian military officer

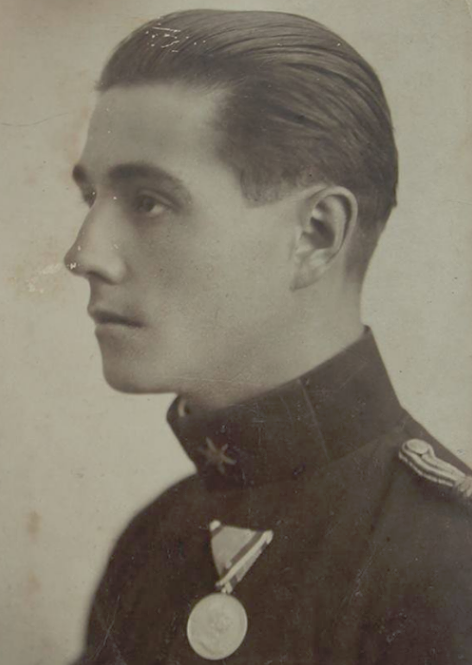
- Rebreanu wearing his Medal for Bravery
- Born: December 17, 1891; Major, Austria-Hungary (now Maieru, Romania)
- Died: May 14, 1917 (aged 25); Between Ghimeș-Făget and Palanca
- Military career
- Allegiance: Austria-Hungary
- Branch: Artillery
- Service years: 1914–1917
- Rank: Second Lieutenant
- Conflicts: Russian Front (March 1915–December 1915); Italian Front (December 1915–May 1916); Romanian Front (August 1916–May 1917)
- Awards: Medal for Bravery

Emil Rebreanu (December 17, 1891 – May 14, 1917) was an ethnic Romanian soldier who served as an officer in the Austro-Hungarian Army during World War I and was executed for desertion. The protagonist in Forest of the Hanged, a 1922 novel by his brother Liviu Rebreanu, is drawn from his experience.

== Biography ==
Born as the fifth of fourteen children, Rebreanu came from a Romanian Greek-Catholic family in Major, Beszterce-Naszód County (present-day Maieru, Bistrița-Năsăud County, Romania), in Austria-Hungary. He graduated from high school in 1913 and entered the Law faculty of Franz Joseph University in Cluj (Kolozsvár), but was forced to interrupt his studies upon the war's outbreak.

Within a year of joining combat, he was made a second lieutenant in the Austro-Hungarian Army. He fought in Russia and Galicia, sustaining multiple injuries. Rebreanu also distinguished himself on the Italian Front and was given the Gold Medal for Bravery, the highest award granted by the Austrian command to a Romanian. However, once he arrived on the Romanian Front, Rebreanu decided that rather than fight against his fellow Romanians, he would join them. Constantin Kirițescu wrote: "Approaching Romanian soil, Rebreanu heard the secret call of his brothers' souls, whispering from beyond the trenches. Between his unnatural soldierly duty and his holy duty as a Romanian, Rebreanu heeded the latter."

Thus, on the night of May 10–11, 1917, having escaped from the infirmary where he was sequestered, he tried to cross the front to the Romanian side, bringing with him the plans for dividing and positioning Austro-Hungarian troops in the area. He was found and arrested by a patrol of imperial officers. Tried by a military court of the 16th Honvéd brigade, on May 12–13, on charges of desertion and espionage, he was stripped of his rank and sentenced to death. As an added humiliation, the method was specified as hanging. According to eyewitnesses, before being executed at 10 p.m. on May 14, he pushed aside the executioner and before the multitude of soldiers, many of whom were Romanians brought there as a warning, shouted "Long live Greater Romania!"

== Legacy ==
Forest of the Hanged, a novel by his brother Liviu Rebreanu, is dedicated: "To the memory of my brother Emil, executed by the Austro-Hungarians, on the Romanian Front, in 1917." Liviu only learned of the execution in 1919, but quickly made several visits to the area, ultimately publishing the book in 1922. When he found out about the hanging, he had already been thinking of a novel drawing upon Emil's letters from the front describing the atmosphere there. Subsequently, he incorporated what Emil had undergone into the book. Nevertheless, he made important changes, describing his brother as an "unscrupulous nationalist" whose true character would have inspired "at most a patriotic poem". Among the individuals whom he fictionalized were successive love interests Elena Haliță ("Marta Domșa") and Ilona Lászlo ("Ilona Vidor", daughter of Făget's mayor in real life, but of a gravedigger in the book), as well as General Karg, who issued the death sentence. In October 1921, he was present at his brother's exhumation and reburial on the soil of the former Romanian Old Kingdom, which the latter had requested prior to being hanged.

A street in Bistrița bears Emil's name since 1995, one in Năsăud since 1996, and there is one in Onești as well. In 2012, a monument was unveiled in his memory at the border between Ghimeș-Făget and Palanca in Bacău County, around the place where the hanging is believed to have occurred. Four meters high and made of stone and bronze, one side depicts him in effigy, while the other shows Saint George.

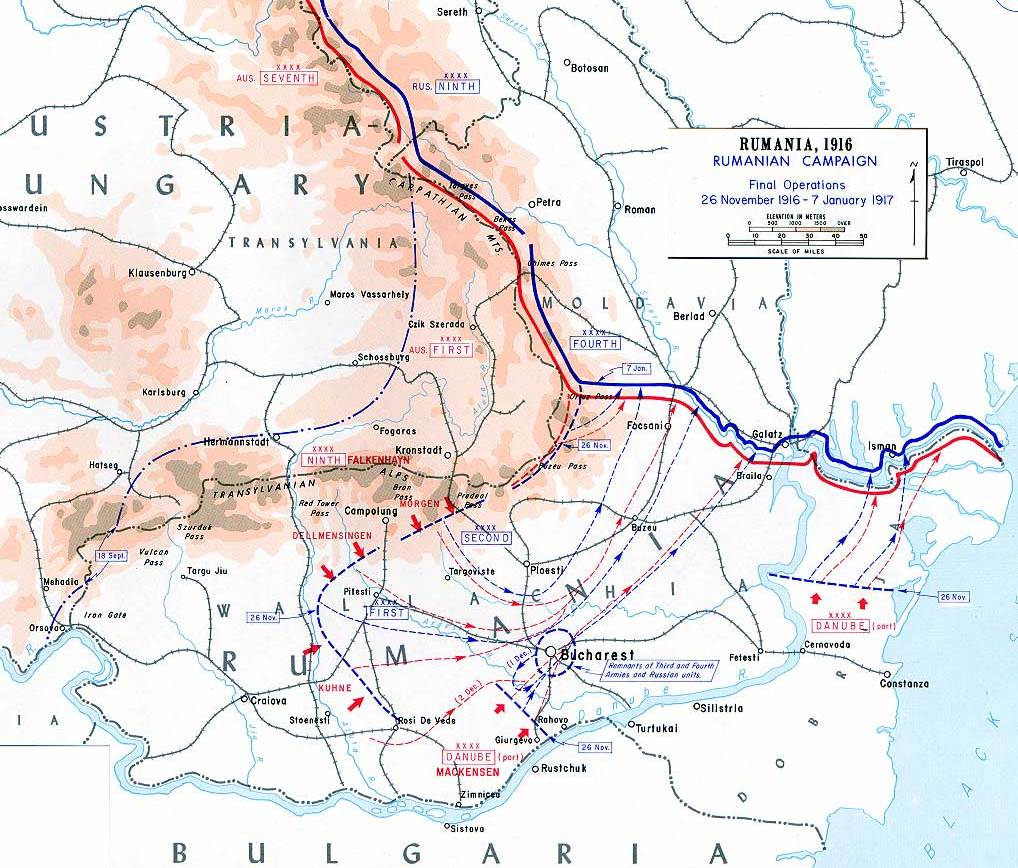
The Romanian Front in 1916-1917. Rebreanu was assigned to the Ghimeș Pass area and tried going from west to east.

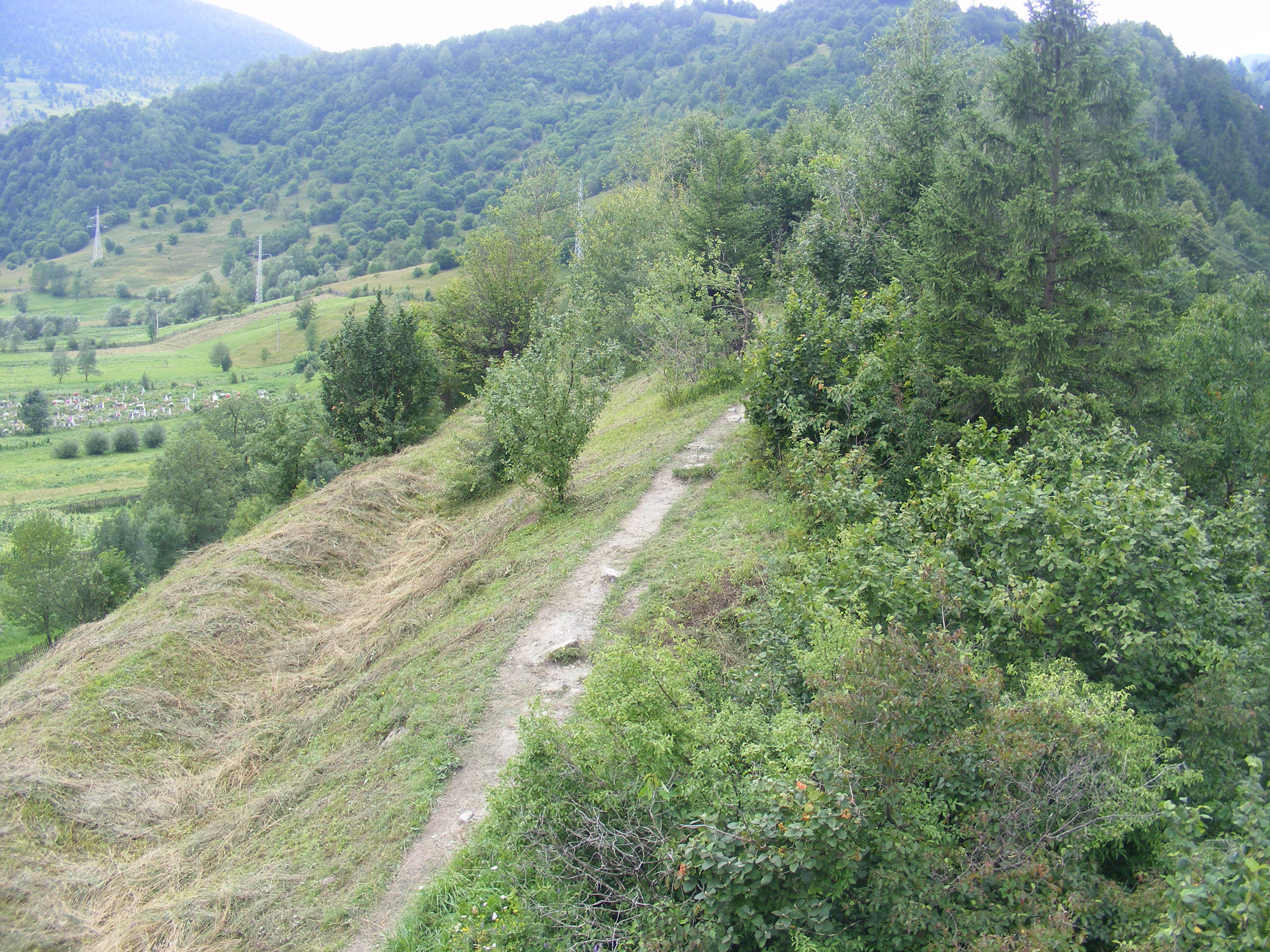
The former border between Romania and Hungary in Ghimeș-Făget, not far from where Rebreanu was caught.
