= Butimanu =

- Commune
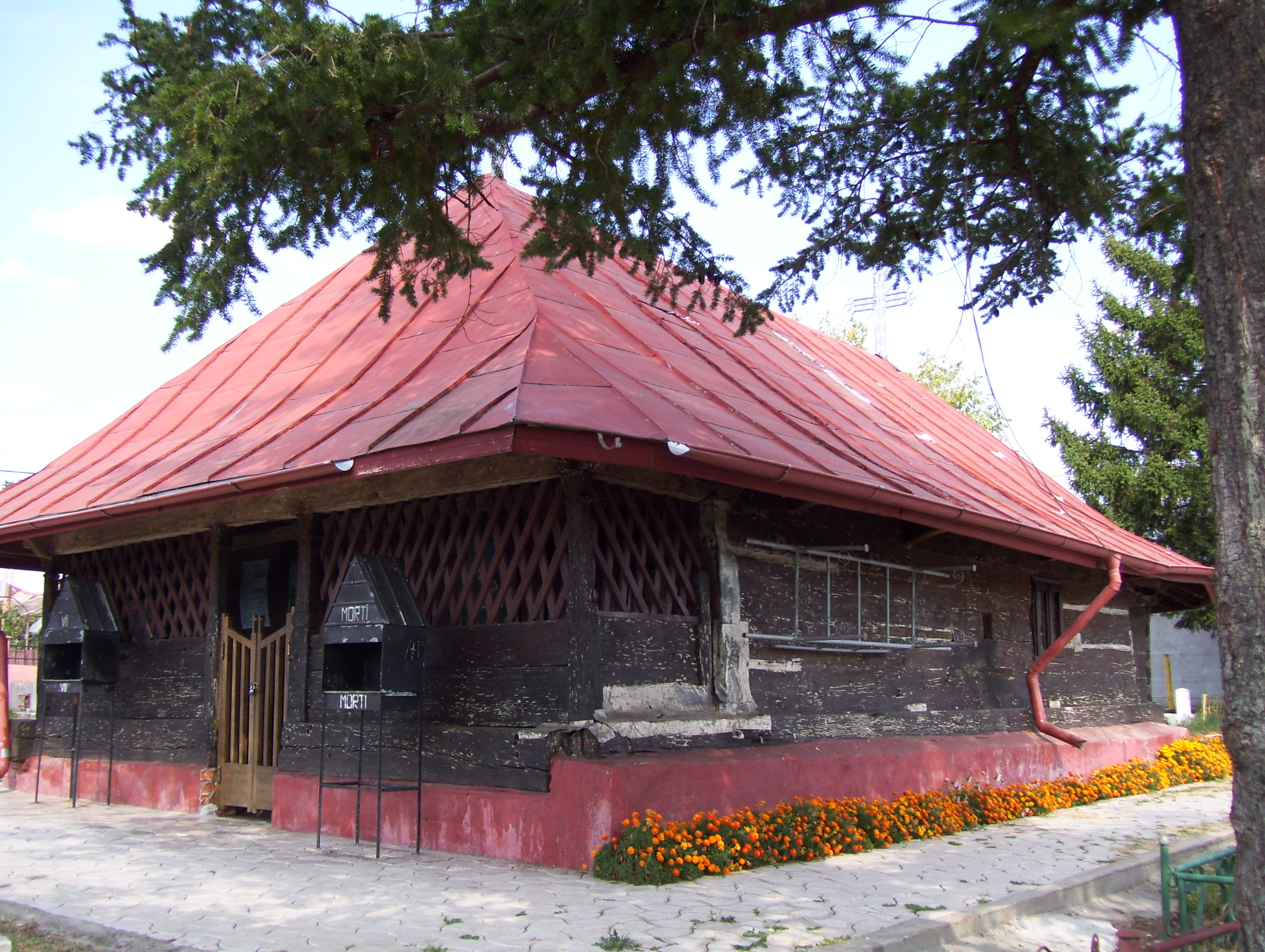
- "Decindea" Assumption church in Butimanu (1791)

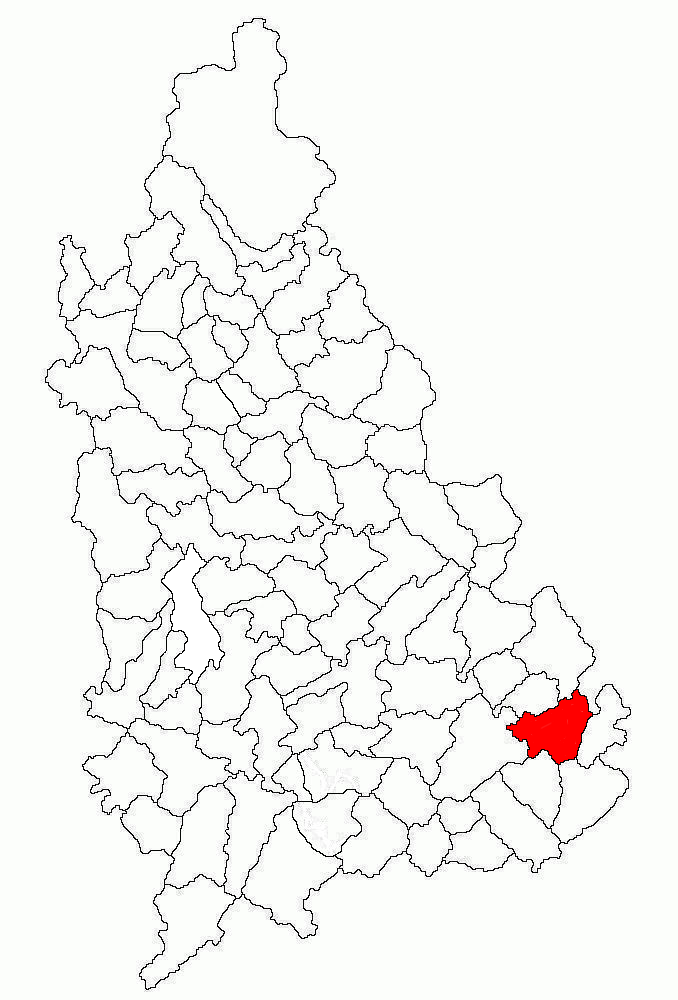
- Location in Dâmbovița County

- Location in Romania
- Coordinates: 44°41′N 25°54′E
- Country: Romania
- County: Dâmbovița

Government
  - Mayor (2020–2024): Cezar-Gabriel Dragnea (PSD)
- Area: 47.18 km^{2} (18.22 sq mi)
- Elevation: 125 m (410 ft)
- Population (2021-12-01): 2,469
  - Density: 52.33/km^{2} (135.5/sq mi)
- Time zone: UTC+02:00 (EET)
  - Summer (DST): UTC+03:00 (EEST)
- Postal code: 137075
- Area code: +(40) 245
- Vehicle reg.: DB
- Website: primaria-butimanu.ro

Butimanu is a commune in Dâmbovița County, Romania. It is composed of four villages: Bărbuceanu, Butimanu, Lucianca, and Ungureni. It is situated in the historical region of Muntenia.

Historical population
Year	Pop.	±%
2002	2,359	—
2011	2,435	+3.2%
2021	2,469	+1.4%
Source: Census data

== Natives ==
- Constantin Prezan (1861–1943); a general during World War I, he was given in 1930 the honorary title of Marshal of Romania
