= Northern front of the Battle of Transylvania =

- Part of the Battle of Transylvania of the Romanian Campaign of World War I
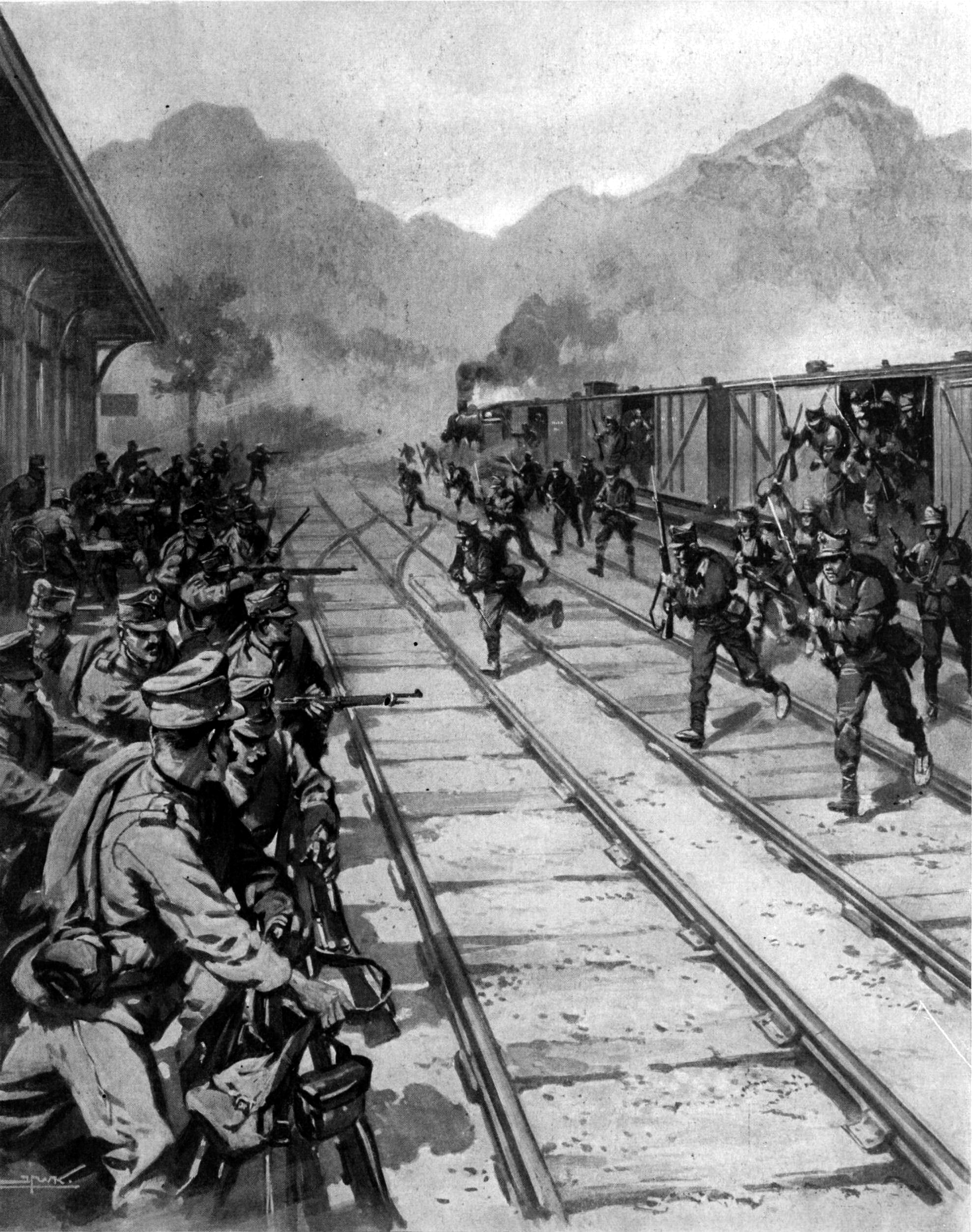
- Romanian soldiers surprising the Austro-Hungarians at the Nagy-Gyimes railway station
Date	27 August–16 October 1916
Location	Northeastern Transylvania, Austria-Hungary (today in Romania)
Result	Romanian tactical victory

Belligerents
Romania	Austria-Hungary; Germany

Commanders and leaders
(Kingdom of Romania) Constantin Prezan (Kingdom of Romania) Ion Antonescu	(Austria-Hungary) Arthur Arz von Straussenburg (German Empire) Curt von Morgen

Units involved
Romanian North Army	1st Army; 7th Army (Battle of the Kelemen Mountains only)

Casualties and losses
Negligible overall Battle of the Kelemen Mountains: 136 killed 55 prisoners	First day of the Romanian offensive: 741 prisoners Final phase of the Romanian offensive: 1,753 prisoners 4 machine guns Battle of the Kelemen Mountains: 10 killed 63 wounded 44 prisoners 82 missing

On 27 August 1916, Romania entered World War I on the side of the Allies, three of its armies invading Transylvania. The 1st and 2nd Armies invaded the southern part, while the Romanian North Army invaded the northeastern part. Unlike the 1st and 2nd Armies – which had to contend with a German-led counter-offensive (First Battle of Petrozsény, Battle of Brassó) – the North Army faced primarily Austro-Hungarian forces, and as such its campaign hardly had any major battles. After conquering three Hungarian urban districts (including two county capitals), the undefeated North Army was ordered to withdraw due to events outside its control, after inflicting heavier losses than those it had incurred.

== Background ==
The North Army had to cross the greatest distance to accomplish its mission, and as such it had a greater number of soldiers than either of the two other Romanian armies invading Transylvania. Commanding the North Army was General Constantin Prezan, an officer who had studied in France. Prezan was, however, widely regarded as more of a courtier than a serious military officer. Fortunately for the Romanians, his operations officer was Captain Ion Antonescu, a "talented if prickly" individual. Such was the influence of Captain Antonescu that, in his memoirs, General Alexandru Averescu used the formula "Prezan (Antonescu)" to denote Prezan's plans and actions.

Initially, the Romanian North Army was opposed by a single Austro-Hungarian infantry division, the 61st. Part of General Arthur Arz von Straussenburg's 1st Army, it was weak and battered during battles against the Russians, the division amounting to only 3,555 men.

== Romanian offensive ==
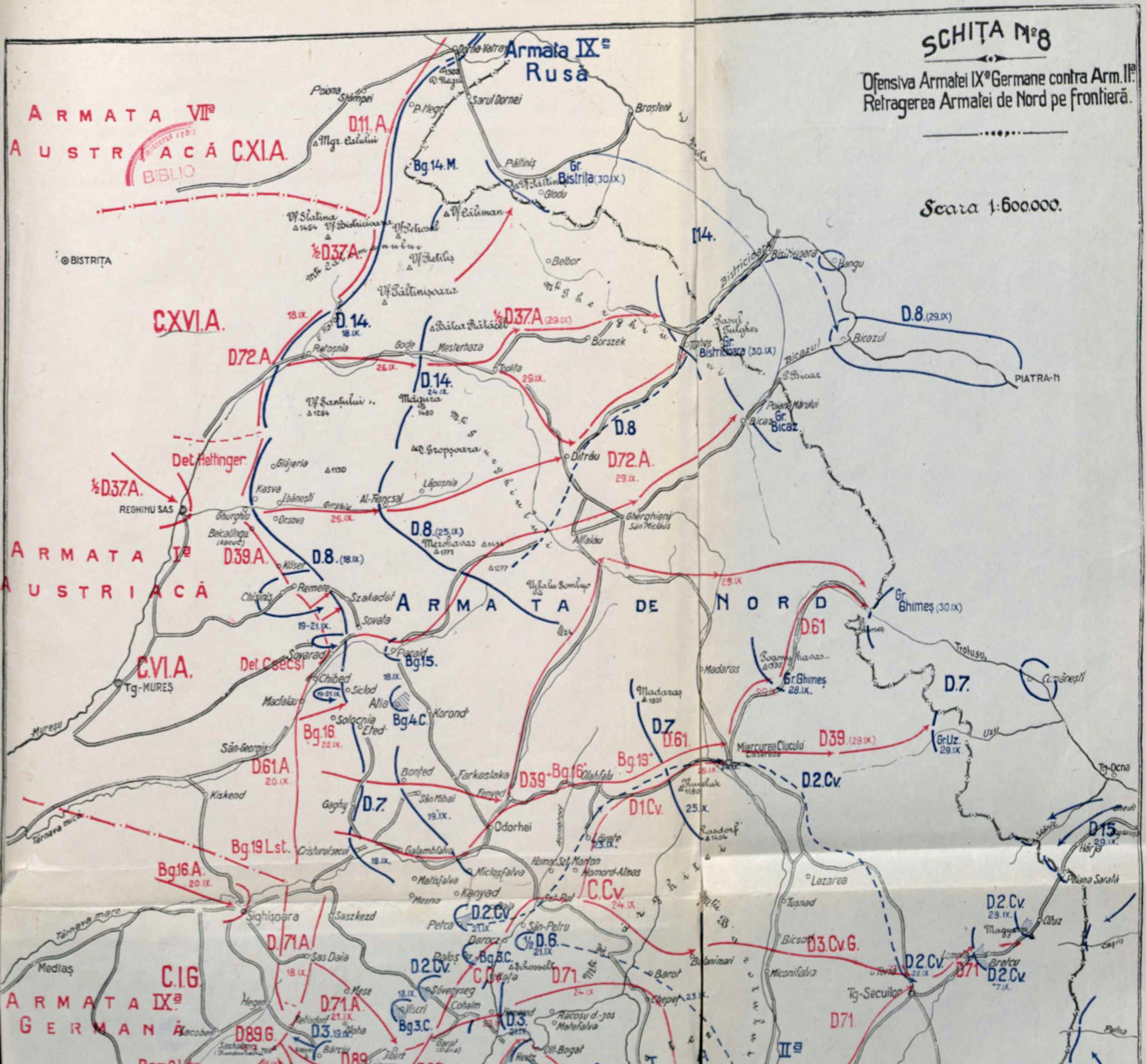
Romanian map showing the maximum advance of the Romanian North Army into Transylvania, using a blue line which passes, from South to North, to the west of Székelykeresztúr (on the map, Cristurul secui), Parajd (on the map, Paraid) and Libánfalva (on the map, Ibănești)

The fragile Austro-Hungarian defenses faltered at the first push of the Romanian covering forces. Two regiments from the 15th Brigade of the 8th Division seized Kézdivásárhely (Târgu Secuiesc) on 29 August, the Romanian forces arriving in time to destroy the last train leaving the town. The Austro-Hungarians did manage to blow up a critical railroad viaduct near the border. Although the Romanians had prepared a special commando unit under Lieutenant Ilie Șteflea to cross the border three hours before the start of the invasion and secure the viaduct, the 14th Romanian Infantry Regiment jumped the gun and crossed the border along with the commandos. Having lost the element of surprise, the Romanians alerted the Austro-Hungarians, who blew up the railroad viaduct. In early September, the Romanians reached Csíkszereda (Miercurea Ciuc), capital of Csik County. There, they temporarily halted their offensive and dug in on the east side of the Olt River. Further to the north, the Austro-Hungarians gave up Bélbor (Bilbor) after running out of ammunition. One brigade kept the Romanians largely east of Borszék (Borsec) while gendarmes held their own in the Kelemen (Călimani) Mountains. For the most part, however, Austro-Hungarian soldiers along the border limped towards the Transylvanian interior, accompanied by hordes of German and Hungarian refugees. For instance, over two thirds of the population of Csíkszereda left the town. However, as events would unfold, such behavior would prove exaggerated. In many places, the ethnic-Hungarian civilian population attacked small scattered groups of Romanian soldiers. A fact not merely admitted, but praised in the Hungarian press of the time, such as the newspaper Pesti Napló. In response, the Romanians nowhere took to reprisals, beyond fighting and disarming the civilians who put up active resistance. Wherever the Romanian Army advanced, proclamations were published promising safety and protection to all inhabitants, regardless of nationality. No damage was done by the Romanian armies to the property of civilians, regardless if said property belonged to ethnic-Hungarians (Székelys) or ethnic-Germans (Transylvanian Saxons).

On 8 September, the Romanians announced themselves in possession of Maroshévíz (Toplița), Csíkpálfalva (Delnița), and Gyergyószentmiklós (Gheorgheni). The Romanian North Army crossed the Olt River on 7 September. The 7th Division, after pushing aside the 19th Honvéd Brigade, continued its advance through the mountains towards Székelyudvarhely (Odorheiu Secuiesc). Having shouldered aside the 16th Honvéd Brigade at Gyergyószentmiklós, the 14th Division reached the eastern edges of the salt-mining town of Parajd (Praid) on 11 September. On 13 September, the Romanians had driven the 1st Landsturm Cavalry Brigade from the heights near Praid. By late September, the I Reserve Corps under the command of the German General Curt von Morgen, had joined the Austro-Hungarians in their fight against the Romanian North Army. The Corps succeeded in slowing the Romanians down. Von Morgen's I Reserve Corps comprised two infantry divisions: the 89th German and the 71st Austro-Hungarian.

On 28 September, the Romanian North Army renewed its offensive. Despite stubborn Austro-Hungarian resistance, it continued to inch forward throughout the following week, advancing to within six miles of Szászrégen (Reghin) and securing the heights above Parajd by early October. In early October, the Romanian General Staff issued orders for the retreat of the North Army, due to the events unfolding in the region of Dobruja. General Arz ordered his tired forces to pursue the Romanians, but the exhausted Austro-Hungarians moved slowly, giving the Romanians an uncontested run to the border, where they settled into defensive positions prepared before the war. The pace of the pursuit is exemplified by the situation of Székelyudvarhely. This town, capital of Udvarhely County, was taken by the Romanians on 21 September. It was retaken by the Austro-Hungarians on 8 October, however the Romanians were already gone. Having begun its retreat on 5 October, the Romanian North Army had already evacuated the town on the 7th, one day before the Austro-Hungarians arrived. By 14 October, the North Army had almost everywhere fallen back to the Romanian border. Csíkszereda was evacuated by the Romanians on 11 October. The furthest advance of the Romanian North Army was achieved on 3 October, following an offensive beyond Székelykeresztúr (Cristuru Secuiesc). Thus, the line of the North Army's furthest advance was drawn through Libánfalva (Ibănești), west of Parajd (Praid) and west of Székelykeresztúr (Cristuru Secuiesc). The town of Kézdivásárhely (Târgu Secuiesc) was the Transylvanian urban settlement that was held by the Romanians during the Battle of Transylvania for the longest. The Romanian 15th Brigade of the 8th Division of the Romanian North Army took Kézdivásárhely (Târgu Secuiesc) on 29 August. Austrian military maps reveal that the town remained in Romanian hands well into October. On 8 and 9 October, as the Battle of Brassó was drawing to a close, two Romanian units retreated from the north and northwest and formed a defensive perimeter around Kézdivásárhely. As of 14 October, most of the Romanian North Army's positions had fallen back towards the Romanian border, with the exception of Kézdivásárhely. As late as that day, the town was still firmly in Romanian hands, with Romanian positions to both the north and the south of it. It is not known when exactly was the town retaken by the Central Powers, but the date could only be 15 or 16 October, because on the latter date, the Battle of Transylvania ended: by 16 October, the Romanians had been driven back all along the line and Transylvania had been cleared.

On the first day of the offensive, the IV Romanian Corps of the North Army took 741 prisoners. During late September – early October, the North Army captured a further 511 prisoners and 4 machine guns in the mountains, along with 1,242 further prisoners during an offensive beyond Székelykeresztúr (Cristuru Secuiesc). The North Army carried out its retreat in the best order and suffered only negligible losses.

The last days of the operation were marked by fighting at the mountain passes along the border. Violent fighting began in the Uz and Oituz Passes on 14 October. Between 13 and 15 October, the Austro-Hungarians conquered Palanca.

=== Battle of the Kelemen Mountains ===
A local setback for the Romanians, this low-scale engagement is the only battle during the Romanian North Army's offensive into Transylvania for which the exact casualties on both sides are known. It is questionable why the area of the Kelemen Mountains was given so much attention by the Austro-Hungarian command. The area had no roads of note, and the Romanians were not going to cross the mountains with any units other than the smallest ones. General Arz sent the VII Battalion of the 72nd Division, along with 4 machine guns to the area. The battalion was temporarily made part of the 73rd Honvéd Brigade of the I Army Corps of the 7th Army. The 6/9 Mountain artillery battery was subsequently attached to the VII Battalion, and the reinforced unit was sent to engage the Romanians alongside local gendarmes. The Romanians had already driven the gendarmes from Pietrosz (Pietrosu). The Austro-Hungarians attacked on 17 September, and initially made good progress, until the 27th Company ran into a trap and lost 44 of its men as prisoners. Several days of intense fighting followed, the Romanians being driven back to the east. The Romanians lost 136 killed and 55 prisoners, while the Austro-Hungarians lost 10 killed, 63 wounded and 82 missing. On 9 October, the VII Battalion was relieved by a Honvéd regiment from the XI Corps, the battalion rejoining its parent division, the 72nd.

== Aftermath ==
After 14 October, when the fighting in the Uz and Oituz Passes commenced, the Romanians overall held their ground, inflicting reverses and serious losses. After conquering Palanca between 13 and 15 October, the Austro-Hungarians were intercepted at Agăș on 18 October, where they were forced to hastily retreat. The Romanians captured almost 1,000 prisoners, 12 guns and numerous machine guns. By 26 October, the Austro-Hungarians had gained very little territory across the Romanian border while sustaining very heavy losses.
