= Arșița River =

Arșița River may refer to:

- Arșița, a tributary of the Ciugheș in Bacău County
- Arșița, a tributary of the Dămuc in Neamț County

== See also ==
- Arșița (disambiguation)
- Arsura River (disambiguation)
