= Liviu Rebreanu National College =

Romanian public day college

Coordinates: 47.1348°N 24.4952°E

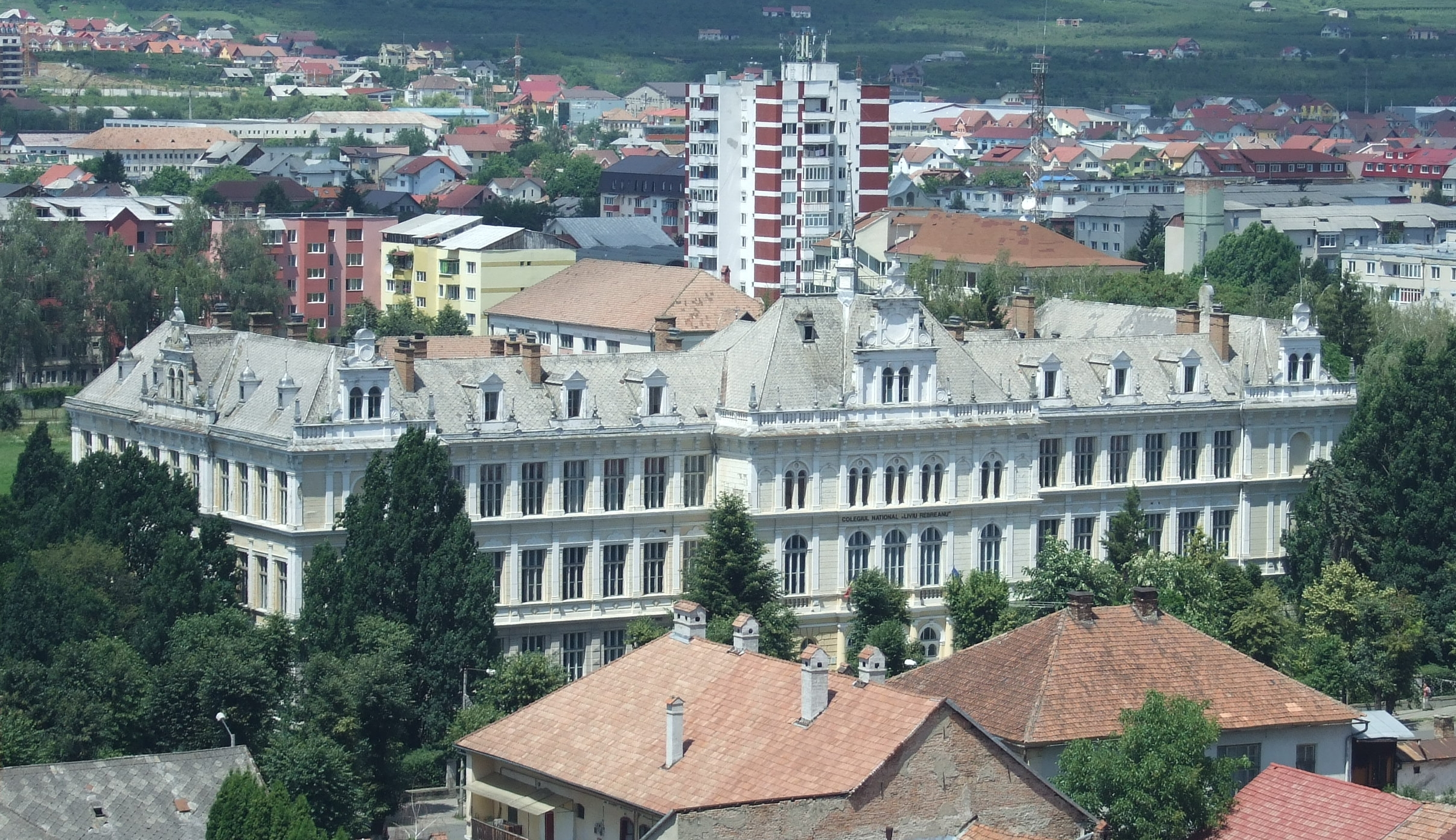
Liviu Rebreanu National College

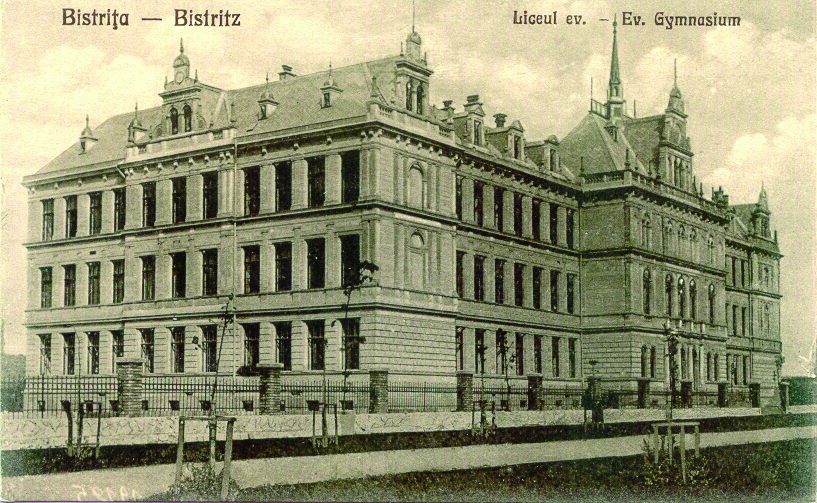
The Lutheran Gymnasium in 1919

Liviu Rebreanu National College (Romanian: Colegiul Național "Liviu Rebreanu") is a public day college in Bistrița, Romania, located at 8 Republicii Boulevard.

The school building, which dates to the Austro-Hungarian period, initially housed the Lutheran Gymnasium, and was used by the city's German-speaking Transylvanian Saxon population. Preparation began in 1900, when the old school was sold and the revenue used to purchase a lot. After additional funds were raised through donations, construction work began in 1908 and was completed in 1911, at which point it went into use. The present institution was established in 1923, following the union of Transylvania with Romania, when it became the first Romanian-language high school in Bistrița. During World War II, the bulk of the local Saxons emigrated to Germany, and the few remaining students were not enough to fill the school. Thus, the building passed to the Romanian high school beginning with the 1944–1945 year.

The school building, which underwent expansion in 1958, is listed as a historic monument by Romania's Ministry of Culture and Religious Affairs.

== Alumni ==
- Miron Cristea
- Liviu Rebreanu
- Alexandru Vaida-Voevod
