= Arsuri =

Arsuri may refer to several villages in Romania:

- Arsuri, a village in Cornereva Commune, Caraş-Severin County
- Arsuri, a village in Schela, Gorj
- Arsuri River, a tributary of the Tișița Mică River in Romania

== See also ==
- Arșița (disambiguation)
