= Bogdănești, Suceava =

Bogdănești
- Commune
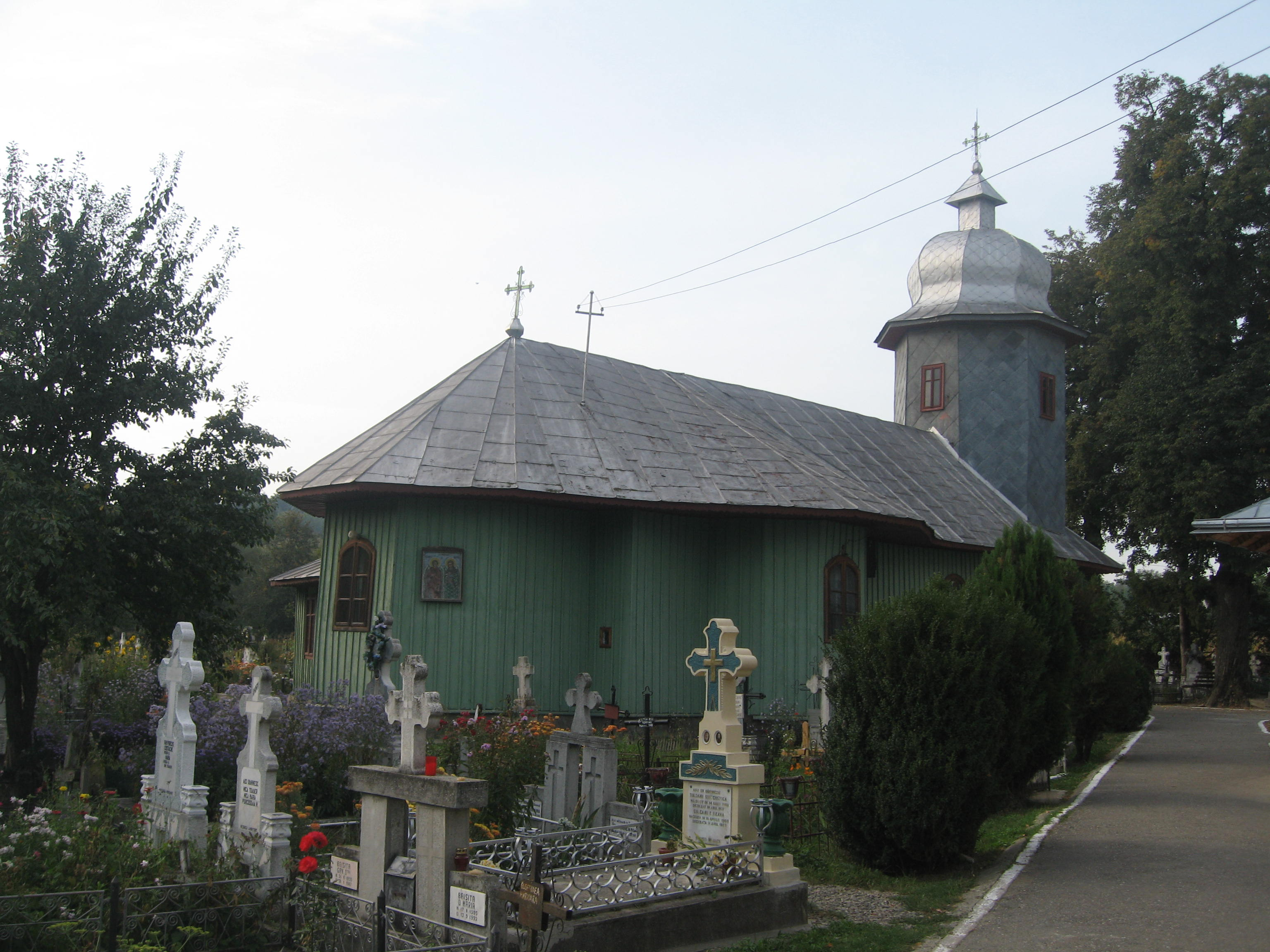
- Wooden church of the Archangels in Bogdănești

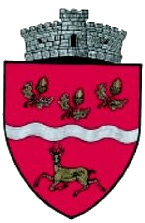
- Coat of arms

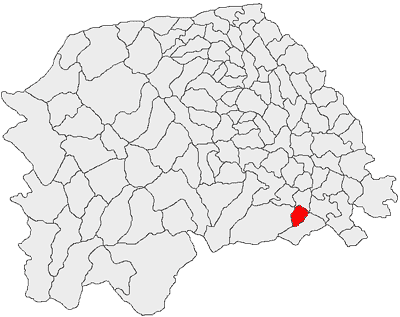
- Location in Suceava County

- Location in Romania
- Coordinates: 47°22′N 26°17′E
- Country: Romania
- County: Suceava

Government
  - Mayor (2020–2024): Cristian-Florin Sopon (PSD)
- Area: 25 km^{2} (9.7 sq mi)
- Elevation: 352 m (1,155 ft)
- Population (2021-12-01): 3,694
  - Density: 150/km^{2} (380/sq mi)
- Time zone: UTC+02:00 (EET)
  - Summer (DST): UTC+03:00 (EEST)
- Postal code: 727035
- Area code: +(40) 230
- Vehicle reg.: SV
- Website: comunabogdanesti.ro

Bogdănești is a commune located in Suceava County, Romania. It is composed of a single village, Bogdănești.

== Natives ==
- Nicolae Alevra (1871 – 1936), brigadier general and politician
- Ioan Hudiță (1896 – 1982), historian and politician
