= Arșița =

Arșița may refer to several villages in Romania:

- Arșița, a village in Măgura Ilvei Commune, Bistrița-Năsăud County
- Arșița, a village in Hodac Commune, Mureș County
- Arșița, a village in Bogdana Commune, Vaslui County
- Arșița, a village in Andreiașu de Jos Commune, Vrancea County
- Arșița, the Romanian name for Arshytsia village, Nyzhni Petrivtsi Commune, Storozhynets Raion, Ukraine

== See also ==
- Arșița River (disambiguation)
- Arsuri (disambiguation)
