= Dacian fortress of Praid =

- Location within Romania
- 46.55°N 25.12°E
- Location: Praid, Harghita, Romania

Site notes
- Condition: Ruined

Monument istoric
- Reference no.: HR-I-s-B-12700

It was a Dacian fortified town.
