= Praid mine =

Salt mine in Harghita County, Romania

Praid salt mine
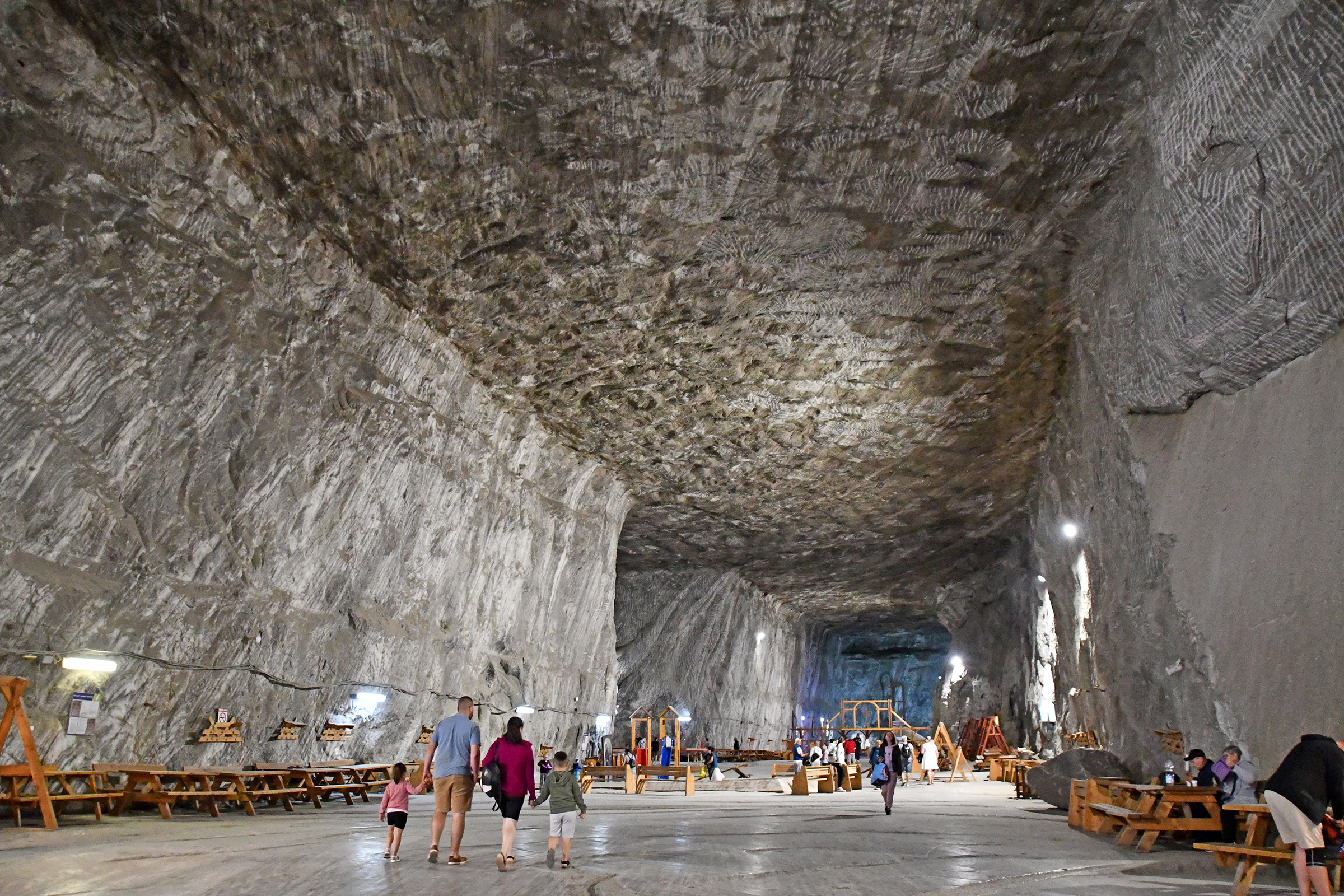
- A section of the mine as seen in 2024
- Interactive map of Praid salt mine
- Location: Praid, Harghita County, Romania
- Products: Sodium chloride
- Opened: 1762
- Closed: 2025
- Company: Salrom
- Website: https://www.salinapraid.ro/

The Praid salt mine (Romanian: Salina Praid; Hungarian: Parajdi sóbánya) is a currently closed large salt mine located in central Romania in Harghita County, close to Praid. Praid represented one of the largest salt reserves in Romania having estimated reserves of 50 billion tonnes of NaCl. The Praid salt mine is also an attraction on the route of the Via Transilvanica long-distance trail, which passes through the village of Praid.

== 2025 closure ==
In late May 2025, the mine experienced severe flooding in both its mining and tourist sections, leading to its closure. The incident was caused by heavy torrential rains that significantly swelled the nearby Corund stream, increasing its flow up to 100-120 times its normal rate and causing water to infiltrate the mine. An underground dam, built to prevent water ingress, also collapsed.

The flooding resulted in the evacuation of personnel and equipment, compromising underground salt stocks and leading to the loss of machinery. While authorities initially stated there was no immediate risk of total collapse, the situation remains critical, and the mine's closure severely impacts the local economy, which heavily relies on tourism. Efforts were made to divert water and pump it out, but improvised dams failed. Hungary has offered assistance for the mine's restoration, and the Romanian government also provided support. Locals have criticised SALROM, the mine's owner, for not taking adequate preventive measures, especially after previous floods in May 2024. On 31 May 2025, Romanian president Nicușor Dan visited the mine, pledging to reopen it and ensure eventual compensation to the around 130 people whose employment had been affected.
