= Ciugheș =

Romanian river

- Location within Romania

Location
- Country: Romania
- Counties: Bacău County
- Villages: Cădărești, Ciugheș

Physical characteristics
- Mouth: Trotuș
  - location: Palanca
  - coordinates: 46.5302°N 26.1286°E
- Length: 15 km (9.3 mi)
- Basin size: 47 km^{2} (18 sq mi)

Basin features
- Progression: Trotuș→ Siret→ Danube→ Black Sea
- Tributaries
  - left: Arșița
  - right: Grațioasa, Purcăreț

The Ciugheș is a right tributary of the river Trotuș in Romania. It discharges into the Trotuș in Palanca. Its length is 15 km (9.3 mi) and its basin size is 47 km^{2} (18 sq mi).
