= Liviu Rebreanu =

Romanian novelist, playwright, short story writer, and journalist (1885 - 1944)

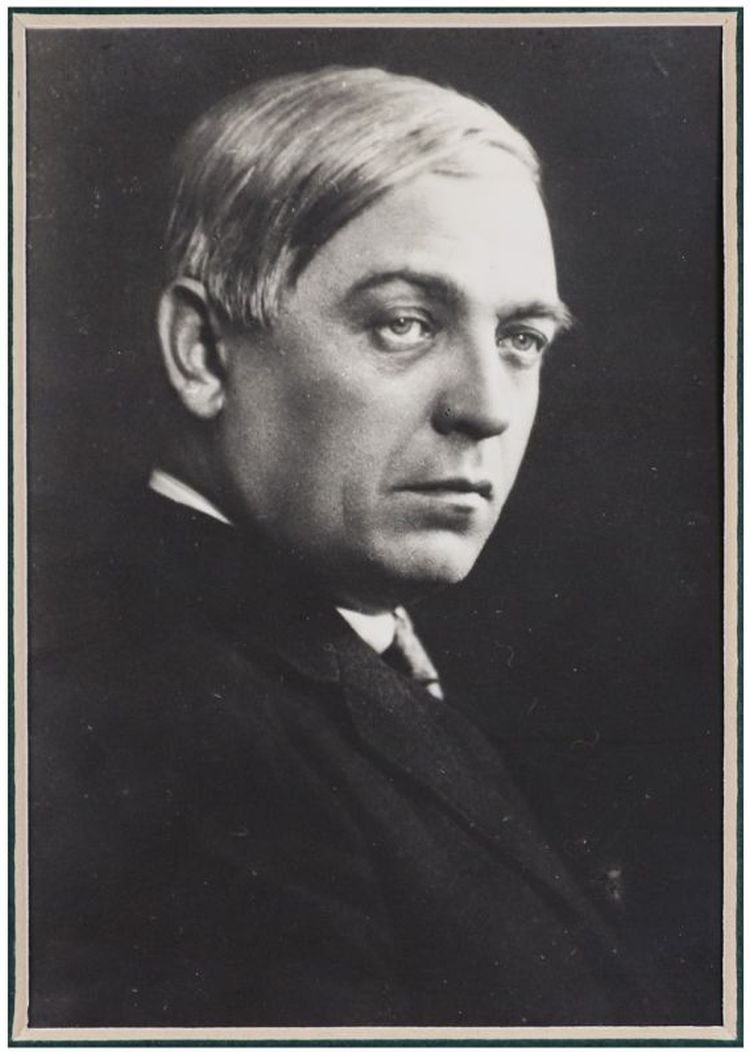
- Born: November 27, 1885; Felsőilosva, Szolnok-Doboka County, Austro-Hungarian Empire (today Târlișua, Bistrița-Năsăud County, Romania)
- Died: September 1, 1944 (aged 58); Valea Mare, Argeș County, Kingdom of Romania
- Resting place: Bellu Cemetery, Bucharest
- Citizenship: Austro-Hungarian Empire; Kingdom of Romania
- Education: Ludovica Military Academy (1903–1906); Superior Military School of Sopron (1900–1903); Lutheran College of Bistrița (1897–1900)
- Occupations: Writer, playwright
- Spouse: Fanny Rebreanu
- Children: Florica
- Relatives: Vasile Rebreanu (father); Ludovica Diuganu (mother); Emil Rebreanu (brother)
- Writing career
- Language: Romanian
- Genres: Short story, novel, theatre
- Notable works: Ițic Ștrul, dezertor (1919); Ion (1920); Catastrofa (1921); Pădurea spânzuraților (1922); Adam și Eva (1925); Ciuleandra (1927); Răscoala (1932)
- Notable awards: Order of the Crown of Romania, Grand Cross rank
- Movement: Realism

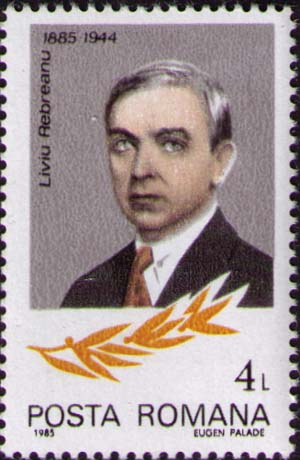
Liviu Rebreanu on a stamp issued by Poșta Română in 1985

Liviu Rebreanu (Romanian pronunciation: [ˈlivju reˈbre̯anu]; November 27, 1885 – September 1, 1944) was a Romanian novelist, playwright, short story writer, and journalist.

== Life ==
Born in Felsőilosva (now Târlișua, Bistrița-Năsăud County, Transylvania), then part of the Kingdom of Hungary, Austria-Hungary, he was the second of thirteen children born to Vasile Rebreanu, a schoolteacher, and Ludovica Diuganu, descendants of peasants. His father had been a classmate of George Coșbuc's and was an amateur folklorist. Liviu Rebreanu went to primary school in Major (now Maieru), where he was taught by his father, and then in Naszód (now Năsăud) and Beszterce (now Bistrița), to military school at Sopron and then to the Ludovica Military Academy in Budapest. He worked as an officer in Gyula but resigned in 1908, and in 1909 illegally crossed the Southern Carpathians into Romania, and lived in Bucharest.

He joined several literary circles, and worked as a journalist for Ordinea, then for Falanga literară și artistică. At the request of the Austro-Hungarian government, he was arrested in February 1910; after being held at Văcărești Prison, he was extradited. Rebreanu was incarcerated in Gyula, being freed in August; after a brief stay in the Beszterce-Naszód (now Bistrița-Năsăud) region he returned to Bucharest. In 1911–1912 he was secretary for the National Theater in Craiova, where he worked under the direction of short story writer Emil Gârleanu. He married actress Fanny Rădulescu.

His first published in 1912 with a volume of novellas gathered under the title Frământări ("Troublings"). During World War I Rebreanu was a reporter for the newspaper Adevărul, and he continued publishing short stories: Golanii ("The Hooligans") and Mărturisire (Confession) in 1916 and Răfuială ("Resentfullness") in 1919. After the war, he became an important collaborator at the literary society Sburătorul led by the literary critic Eugen Lovinescu.

In 1920 Rebreanu published his novel Ion, the first modern Romanian novel, in which he depicted the struggles over land ownership in rural Transylvania. For Ion, Rebreanu received a Romanian Academy award; he became a full member of the institution in 1939. Between 1928 and 1930 he was chairman of the National Theatre of Bucharest, and from 1925 to 1932 he was President of the Romanian Writers' Society. In 1942 he was awarded the Order of the Crown of Romania, Grand Cross rank.

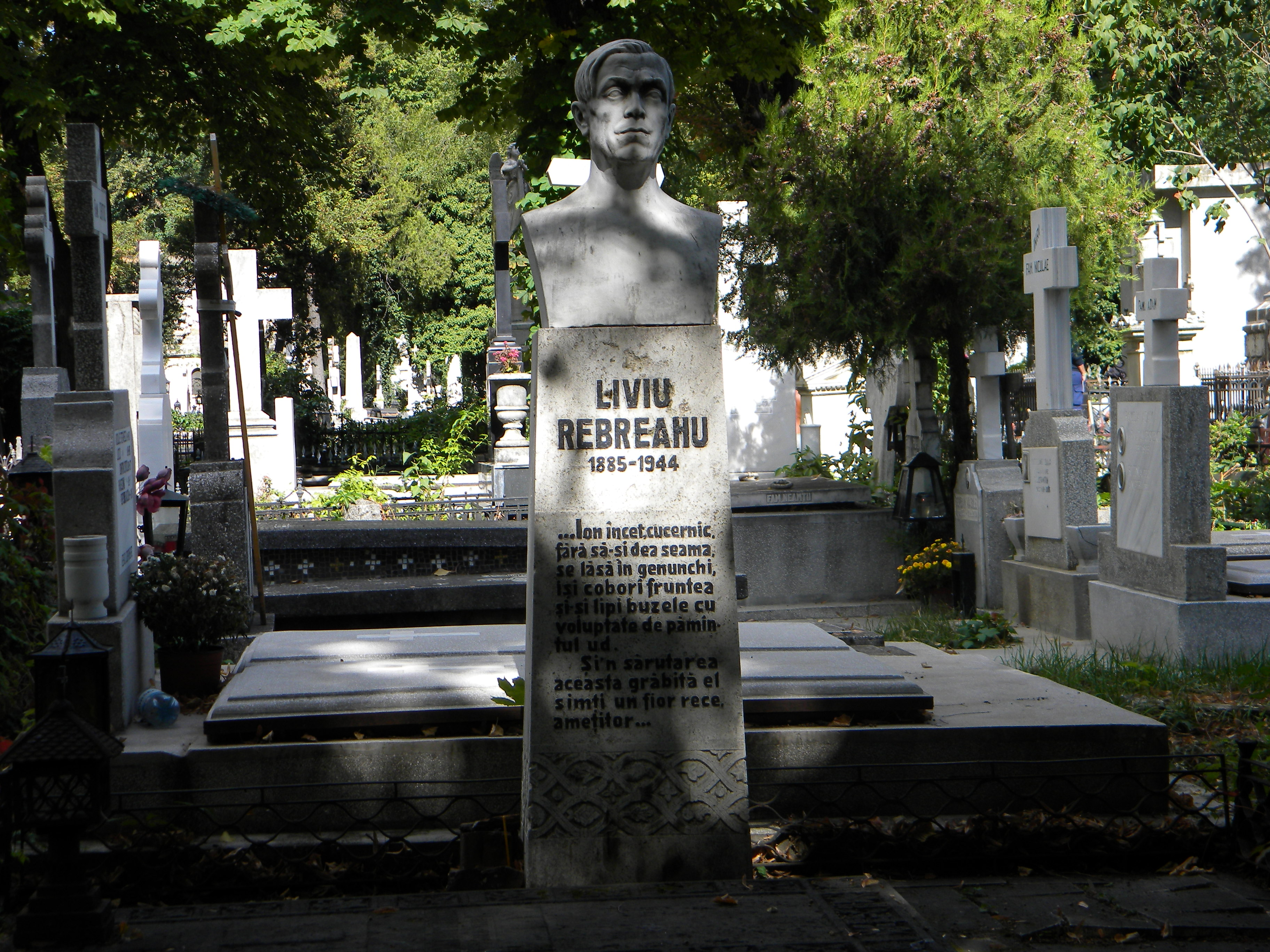
Grave of Rebreanu at Bellu Cemetery

In 1944, aged 59, he died of a lung disease in his country house in Valea Mare-Podgoria, Argeș County. He is buried at Bellu Cemetery in Bucharest.

== Works ==
=== Short stories and novellas ===
- Ițic Ștrul, dezertor ("Ițic Ștrul as a Deserter") (1919)
- Catastrofa ("The Catastrophe") (1921)
- Norocul ("The Luck") (1921)
- Cuibul visurilor ("Nest of Dreams") (1927)
- Cântecul lebedei ("The Swan Song") (1927)

=== Novels on social issues ===
- Ion (1920)

The novel Ion introduces us to the life of the peasants and intellectuals of twentieth century Transylvania. The action takes place mostly in the village called Pripas, but also in the little town going by the name of Armadia. Ion Pop al Glanetașului, industrious son of poor parents, is consumed by his life-long passion for land owning. Despite being in love with Florica, the beautiful girl of a poor widow, he sets his eyes on Ana, the plain looking daughter of rich land owner — Vasile Baciu. The rich man, however, does not want him as his son-in-law, realising that he does not, in fact, love his only daughter, but only aims to take the easy path and marry into wealth. One night, while Vasile is drunk and asleep, Ion pays Ana a secret visit and sleeps with her in spite of her pleading with him not to, therefore dishonoring her. His plan is to thus force her father to give him both the daughter and the fortune. Unaware of this and overwhelmed with the affection Ion showers her with, Ana truly falls in love with the young man, especially after realising she is pregnant with Ion's child. After more conflicts between the two stubborn men, Vasile decides to give Ion the hand of his daughter in marriage and part of the lands he owns. Ion finally appears to be satisfied. He kisses and hugs the gained land, feeling as if this is his one true love, but meanwhile grows tired of Ana whom, despite by now being heavily pregnant, he beats up and scolds every day. After the birth of the child — a sickly baby boy — the young girl becomes even more depressed. Ion, now having achieved all that he has ever wished for, realizes he is still in love with Florica. Despite also being married, Florica answers to Ion's wild passion and advances and Ana finally comprehends the cruel reality. Feeling unloved and hopeless, she hangs herself. Soon after, their feeble child dies as well. Thus the quarrel between Ion and his father-in-law begins once again. Ion is unable to hide his happiness at being one of the wealthiest peasants in Pripas and, yet, no longer trapped in a loveless marriage. Thinking that now he can have beautiful Florica to himself, he pays her a visit one night when her husband is not home. The man however returns without the two lovers knowing and, catching them in the act, he kills Ion with three hoe blows to the head. Ion's last thoughts are "I'm dying like a dog".

- Crăișorul (approx. "The Little King") (1929)
- Răscoala ("The Revolt") (1932)
- Gorila ("The Gorilla") (1938)

=== Psychological novels ===
- Pădurea spânzuraților ("Forest of the Hanged" – a frequent translation title, although the Romanian version translates as "The Forest of the Hanged") (1922)

Pădurea spânzuraților is the artistical transfiguration of his brother Emil's case. The hero of the novel is Apostol Bologa, son of a Romanian lawyer from Transylvania. In the Hungarian schools he gets an education contradictory to his Romanian soul. He becomes a conscientious Austrian officer, he even contributes (by his vote in court) at the sentencing to death of a Czech officer, who had deserted the Austro-Hungarian army. The novel follows his soul metamorphosis, under the influence of the Czech officer Klapka, who seeds in his heart the hatred against the Austrian empire and the love for the Romanian nation. Sent on the Romanian front, in the Eastern Carpathians, the thought of desertion becomes an obsession for him. Being forced again to take part in a military tribunal, to judge a Romanian peasant for espionage, Apostol Bologa starts in the night towards the Romanian lines, to get to his blood brothers. He is caught and hanged, in much the same way as the Czech whom he had helped to condemn.

- Adam și Eva ("Adam and Eve") (1925)
- Ciuleandra (1927)
- Jar ("Embers") (1934)

=== Other novels ===
- Amândoi ("Both") (1940)

=== Plays ===
- Cadrilul ("The Quadrille") (1919)
- Plicul ("The Envelope") (1923)
- Apostolii ("The Apostles") (1926)
