= Forest of the Hanged (novel) =

1922 novel by Liviu Rebreanu

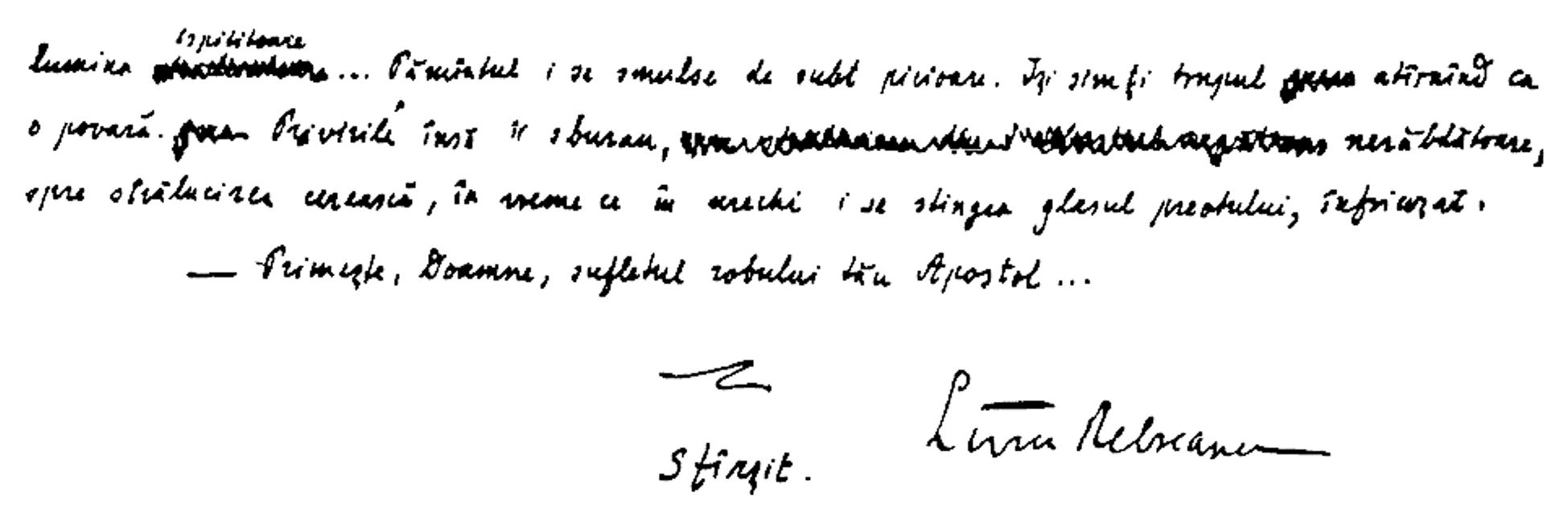
- The closing lines of the novel, in Rebreanu's own handwriting, with signature
- Author: Liviu Rebreanu
- Original title: Pădurea spânzuraților
- Language: Romanian
- Subject: World War I
- Genre: War novel Historical fiction Psychological fiction
- Publisher: Cartea Românească
- Publication date: 1922
- Publication place: Romania
- English publication date: 1930
- Pages: 328

Forest of the Hanged (Romanian: Pădurea spânzuraților) is a novel by Romanian writer Liviu Rebreanu. Published in 1922, it is partly inspired by the experience of his brother Emil Rebreanu, an officer in the Austro-Hungarian Army hanged for espionage and desertion in 1917, during World War I.

The novel was made into a film in 1965. The film was directed by Liviu Ciulei, who won the award for Best Director at the 1965 Cannes Film Festival. Composer Carmen Petra Basacopol created in 1988–1990 an opera titled Apostol Bologa, op. 58, which was inspired by this novel.

== Plot ==
The protagonist is Lieutenant Apostol Bologa, who was born and raised in Parva - then Párva, Beszterce-Naszód County, Transylvania, Kingdom of Hungary. Although he was enrolled in the Philosophy Faculty of the University of Budapest, and he had not been conscripted into the army since he was a widow's son, Bologa volunteers into the Austro-Hungarian Army at the start of World War I. He does that both from a youthful ambition to prove his bravery in front of his fiancée, Marta Domșa, who was enchanted by the military uniforms of the Hungarian officers, as well as from the social views he had acquired in Hungarian schools. After attending artillery school, he is sent to the front. He fights valiantly in Italy and Galicia; wounded twice in the next two years, he is promoted to the rank of lieutenant and decorated three times. Bologa contributes (by his vote in court) at the sentencing to death of a Czech officer, second lieutenant Svoboda, who had deserted the Austro-Hungarian army.

The novel follows his soul metamorphosis, under the influence of the Czech captain Otto Klapka, who seeds in his heart the hatred against the Austrian empire and the love for the Romanian nation. Sent on the Romanian front, in the Eastern Carpathians, the thought of desertion becomes an obsession for him. Being forced again to take part in a military tribunal, to judge a Romanian peasant for espionage, Apostol Bologa starts in the night towards the Romanian lines, to get to his blood brothers. He is caught and hanged, in much the same way as the Czech that he had helped condemn. At the gallows, his confessor recites, "Receive, o Lord, the soul of Thy servant Apostol".

== Editions and translations ==
- Romanian: Pădurea spânzuraților. București: Cartea Românească. 1922
- Czech: Les oběšených. Praha: Šolc a Šimáček. 1928. Translation: Marie Kojecko-Korickova
- English: Forest of the hanged. London: Allen et Co., New York: Duffield & Co. 1930. Translation: Alice V. Wise. OCLC 771706016, OCLC 645787166
- Italian: La foresta degli impiccati. Perugia, Venezia: La Nuova Italia. 1930. Translation: Enzo Loretti OCLC 799604562
- Polish: Las wisielców. Kraków: Wydawnictwa Literacko-Naukowego. 1931. OCLC 890373818
- French: La forêt des pendus. Paris: Éditions Perrin. 1932. Translation: B. Madeleine, Léon Thévenin, André Bellesort
- German: Der Wald der Gehenkten. Cernăuți: Der Tag, 1932. Translation: Ernst Carabăț
- Dutch: Het wout gehangen. Rotterdam. 1932. Translation: Jules Verbegke
- Polish: Las wisielco. Kraków. 1934. Translation: Stanislav Lukasik
- Hungarian: Akasztottak erdeje. 1938. Translation: Imre Somogyi
- Turkish: Asılmışlar Ormanı. Istanbul: İnsel Kitabevi. 1942. Translation: Ziya Yamaç; Asılmışlar Ormanı, Dedalus Yayınevi, 2021. Translation: Erkam Evlice.
- Spanish: El bosque de los ahorcados. Madrid: Stylos. 1944. Translation: Maria Teresa Quiroga Plá, Luis Landinez
- Swedish: De hängdas skog. Stockholm: Bonnier. 1944. Translation: Ingeborg Essen
- Portuguese: A floresta dos enforcados. Lisbon: Gleba, 1945. Translation: Celestino Gomes, Victor Buescu OCLC 651408182
- Finnish: Hirtettyjen metsä. Helsinki: Suomen kirja, 1946. Translation: Lauri Ikonen OCLC 58138066
- Russian: Les poveshennykh. București: Editura de literatură în limbă străine, 1958. Translation: Olga Crușevan
- Russian: Les poveshennykh. Kishinev: Kartia Moldoveniaske, 1960. Vasili Sugoniai OCLC 9141363
- Greek: Το δάσος των κρεμασμένων. Athens: Kedros. 1961. Translation: Kosmas Politis, Maria Dimitriadis-Papaioanu
- Bulgarian: Гората на обесените. Sofia: Narodna Kultura. 1962. Translation: Gergana Stratieva OCLC 40182205
- Slovak: Les obesencov. Bratislava: Slov. vydav. krásnej lit. 1965. Translation: Peter Doval
- Arabic: Gábat al-mauta. Cairo. 1967. Translation: Fauzi Sáhín
- Slovene: Gozd obešencev. Ljubljana: Mladinska knjiga, 1976. Translation: Katja Špur
- Ukrainian: Ліс висільників Kiev: Dnipro, 1990; Translation: Ivan Kushniruk
- Japanese: Shokei no mori. Tokyo: Kobunsha. 1997. Translation: Haruya Sumiya ISBN 4770409176 OCLC 674779185
