= Praid =

Praid Parajd
- Commune
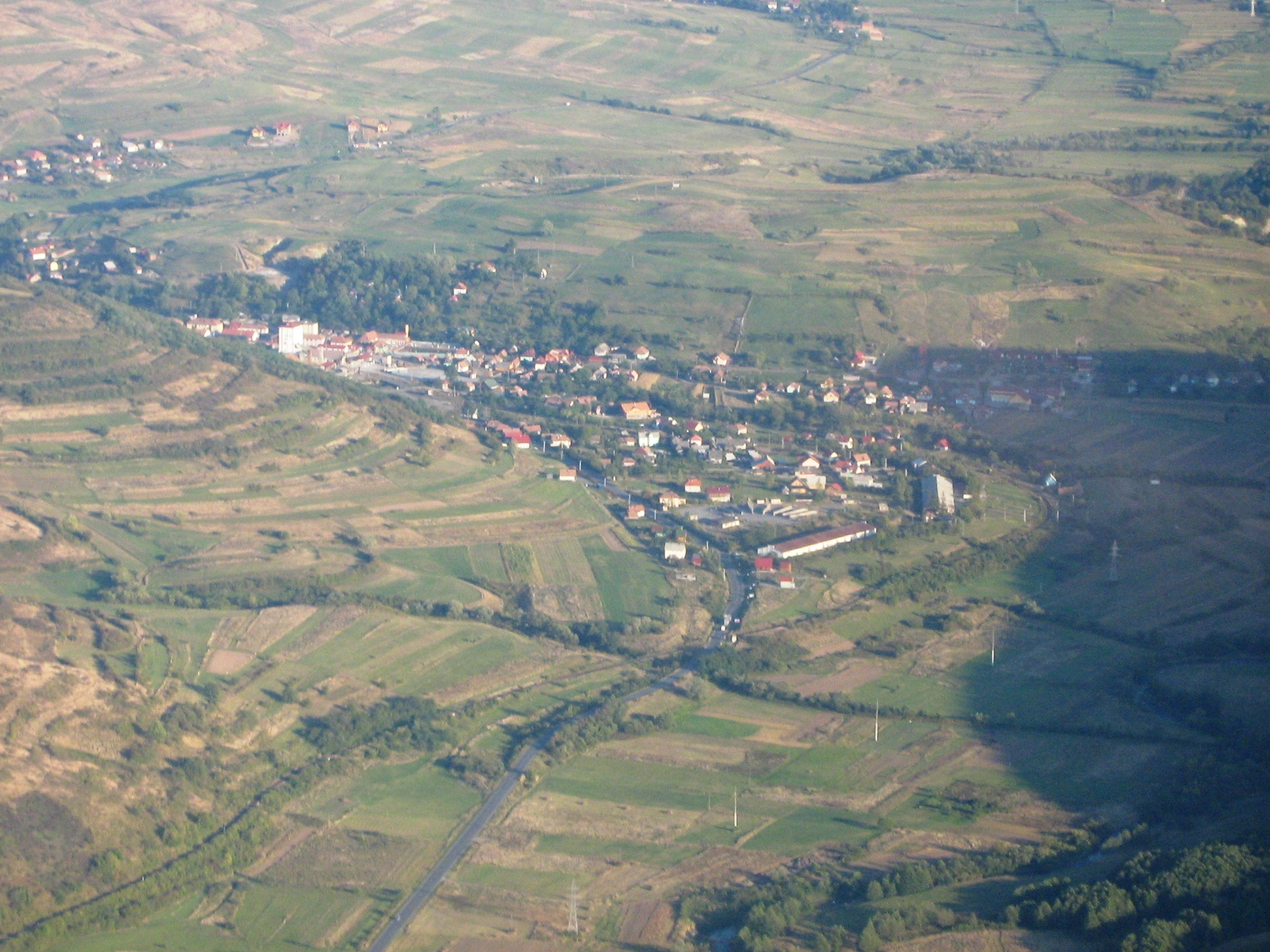

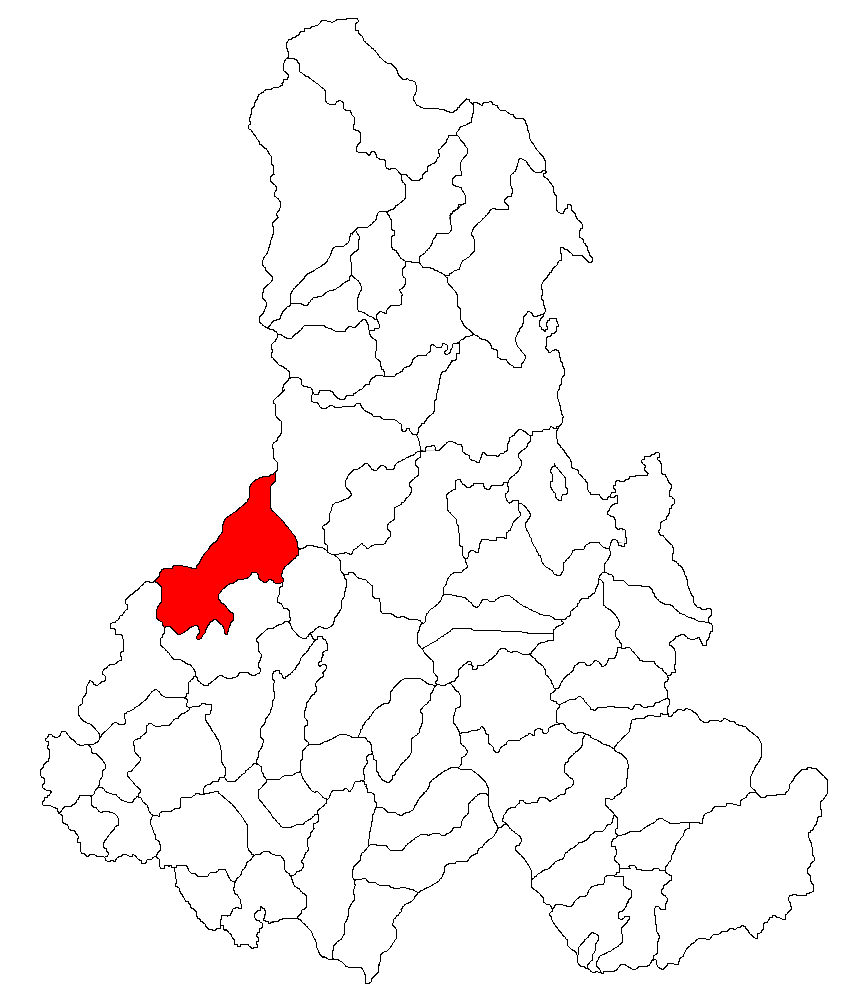
- Location in Harghita County

- Location in Romania
- Coordinates: 46°33′N 25°8′E
- Country: Romania
- County: Harghita

Government
  - Mayor (2020–2024): László Nyágrus (UDMR)
- Area: 180.03 km^{2} (69.51 sq mi)
- Elevation: 506 m (1,660 ft)
- Population (2021-12-01): 6,542
  - Density: 36.34/km^{2} (94.12/sq mi)
- Time zone: UTC+02:00 (EET)
  - Summer (DST): UTC+03:00 (EEST)
- Postal code: 537240
- Area code: +40 266
- Vehicle reg.: HR
- Website: www.primaria-praid.ro

Praid (Hungarian: Parajd, Hungarian pronunciation: [ˈpɒrɒjd]; German: Salzberg) is a commune in Harghita County, Romania. It lies in the Székely Land, an ethno-cultural region in eastern Transylvania, and is composed of six villages: Becaș (Békástanya), Bucin (Bucsin), Ocna de Jos (Alsósófalva), Ocna de Sus (Felsősófalva), Praid (Parajd), and Șașvereș (Sásverés). In the spring of 1919 the population of the commune briefly revolted against the newly installed Romanian administration.

The route of the Via Transilvanica long-distance trail passes through the villages of Șașvereș and Praid.

== Demographics ==
The commune has an absolute Hungarian (Székely) majority. According to the 2011 census it has a population of 6,502, of which 91.68% are Hungarian and 2.65% Roma. The 2002 Census reported 69.36% of the total population belonging to the Protestant Hungarian Reformed Church, while Roman Catholicism is professed by 22.46% of the respondents.

== Natives ==
- Vilmos Nagy de Nagybaczon (1884–1976), commanding general of the Royal Hungarian Army

== Tourism ==
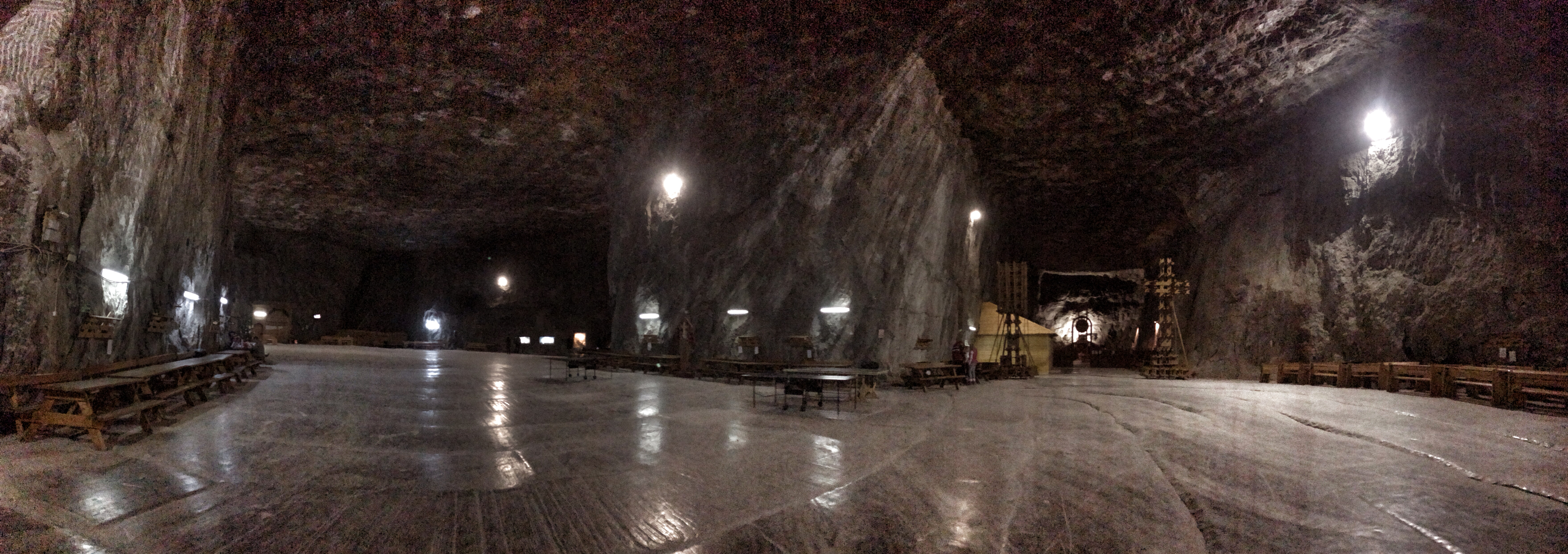
Inside the Praid salt mine

The commune's chief economic activity centers around the Praid salt mine that provides salt for both industrial and gastronomical use and attracts over 400,000 tourists every year.

== See also ==
- Dacian fortress of Praid
