= Mareșal (Romania) =

Highest Rank in the Romanian Armed Forces

Mareșal Marshal
- The insignia of a Mareșal as worn on epaulettes
- Country: Romania
- Rank: Marshal
- NATO rank code: OF-10
- Formation: 1918
- Next lower rank: General; Admiral

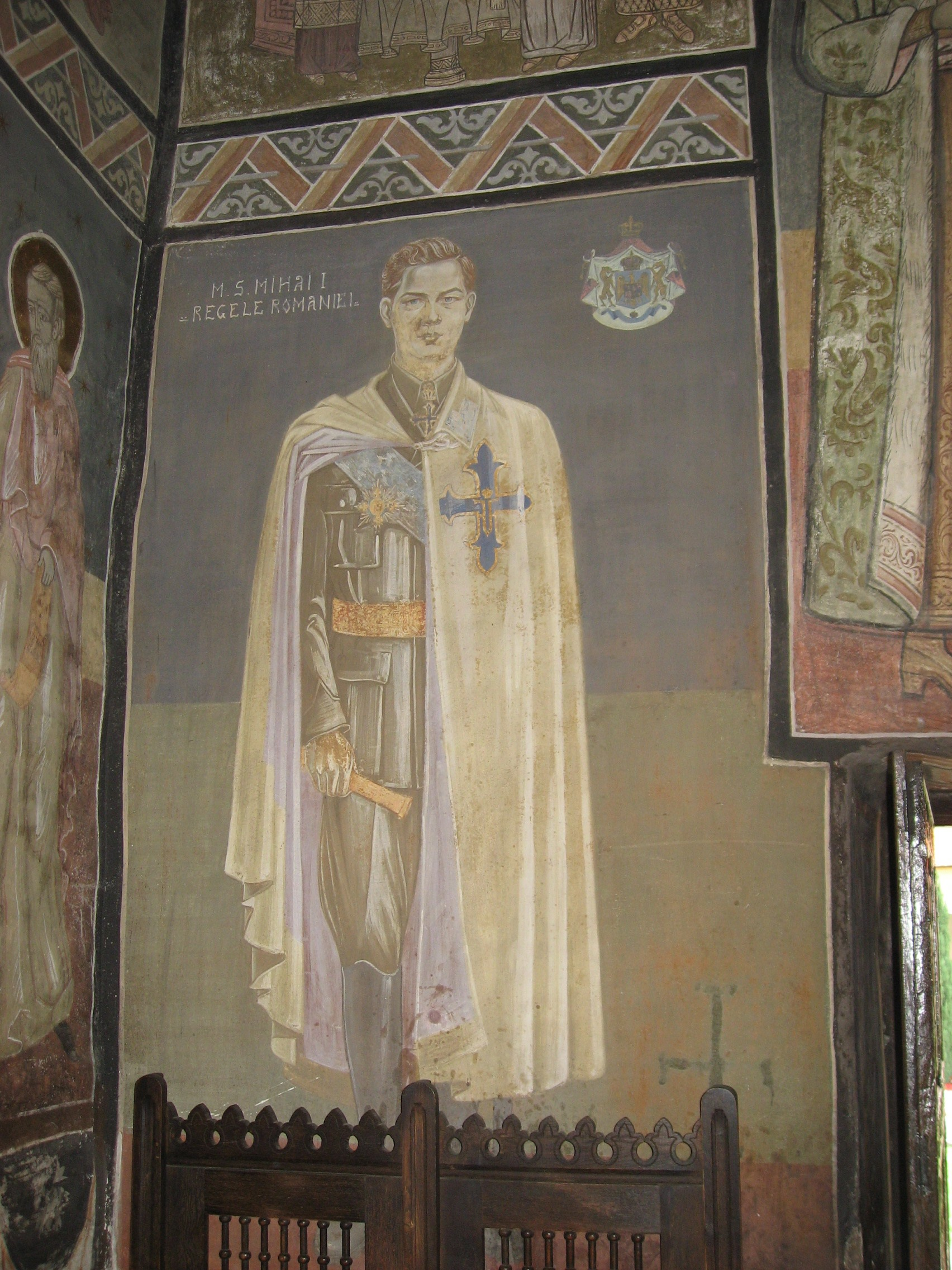
HM King Michael I, the last Marshal of Romania after World War II, depicted in his uniform on the fresco of Sâmbăta de Sus Monastery.

Mareșal (transl. Marshal) is the highest rank in the Army of Romania, the Romanian Armed Forces. It is the equivalent of a field marshal in other countries.

The rank of mareșal can only be bestowed to a General or Admiral, in time of war for exceptional military merits, by the President of Romania and confirmed by the Supreme Council of National Defense.

Only three non-royal persons were bestowed the rank mareșal to date: Alexandru Averescu, Constantin Prezan, and Ion Antonescu. The first two were Generals during World War I, and the last was General during World War II, and Ruler of Romania between the abdication of King Carol II (6 September 1940) and his arrest by King Michael I (23 August 1944). Of the Romanian kings, Ferdinand I, Carol II and Michael I were Marshals of Romania. King Carol I was simultaneously Russian and German field marshal.

== List of rank holders ==
Portrait	Name (born–died)	Appointed	Retired	Notes	Ref.
	Ferdinand I of Romania (1865–1927)	18 November 1918	20 July 1927 †		
	Alexandru Averescu (1859–1938)	14 June 1930	2 October 1938 †		
	Constantin Prezan (1861–1943)	14 June 1930			
	Carol II of Romania (1893–1953)	27 October 1930			
	Michael I of Romania (1921–2017)	10 May 1941			
	Ion Antonescu (1882–1946)	22 August 1941			

== See also ==
- Mareșal (tank destroyer)
