= Dumești, Vaslui =

Dumești
- Commune
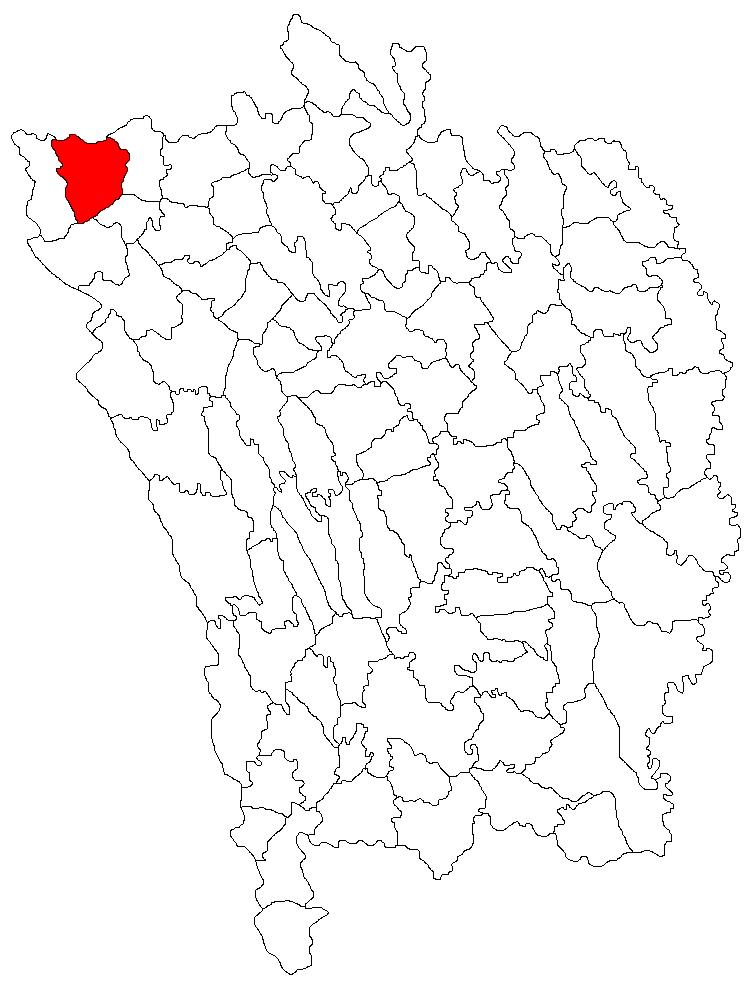
- Location in Vaslui County

- Location in Romania
- Coordinates: 46°51′N 27°17′E
- Country: Romania
- County: Vaslui
- Subdivisions: Dumești, Satul Vechi, Schinetea, Valea Mare
- Population (2021-12-01): 2,963
- Time zone: EET/EEST (UTC+2/+3)
- Vehicle reg.: VS

Dumești is a commune in Vaslui County, Western Moldavia, Romania. It is composed of four villages: Dumești, Dumeștii Vechi, Schinetea and Valea Mare.
