= Constantin Prezan =

Romanian general during World War I

Marshal Constantin Prezan
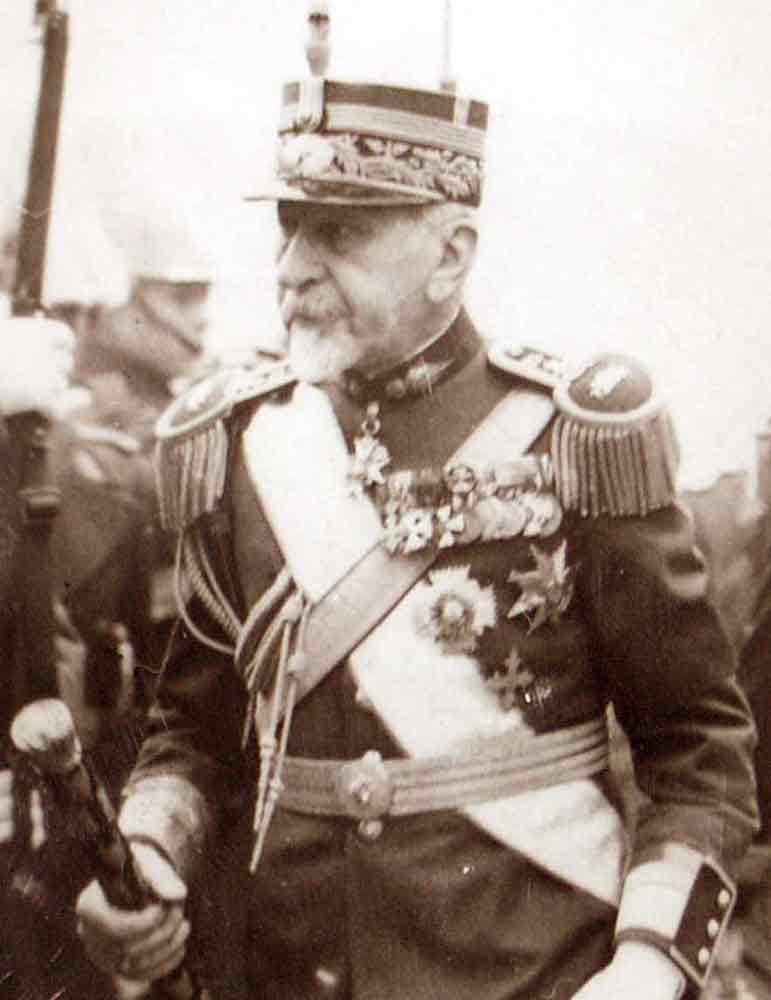

25th and 28th Chief of the Romanian General Staff
- In office 5 December 1916 – 1 April 1918
- Monarch: Ferdinand I
- Prime Minister: Ion I. C. Brătianu; Alexandru Averescu; Alexandru Marghiloman
- Preceded by: Dumitru Iliescu
- Succeeded by: Constantin Cristescu
- In office 28 October 1918 – 20 March 1920
- Monarch: Ferdinand I
- Prime Minister: Constantin Coandă; Ion I. C. Brătianu; Artur Văitoianu; Alexandru Vaida-Voevod; Alexandru Averescu
- Preceded by: Constantin Cristescu
- Succeeded by: Constantin Cristescu

Member of the Crown Council
- In office 30 March 1938 – 6 September 1940
- Monarch: Carol II

Personal details
- Born: 27 January 1861 Butimanu, United Principalities
- Died: 27 August 1943 (aged 82) Bucharest, Kingdom of Romania
- Resting place: Schinetea, Vaslui County
- Education: École spéciale militaire de Saint-Cyr
- Awards: Legion of Honour, Grand Officer; Order of Michael the Brave, 1st, 2nd, and 3rd class

Military service
- Allegiance: Kingdom of Romania
- Branch/service: Romanian Army
- Years of service: 1883–1920
- Rank: Marshal
- Commands: Fourth Army
- Battles/wars: Second Balkan War; World War I; Battle of Transylvania; Northern front; Battle of the Eastern Carpathians; Second Battle of Oituz; Battle of Slatina; Battle of Bucharest; Battle of Prunaru; Pitești–Târgoviște Retreat; Battle of the Argeș; Battle of Galați; Khotyn Uprising; Hungarian–Romanian War

Constantin Prezan (January 27, 1861 – August 27, 1943) was a Romanian general during World War I. In 1930 he was given the honorary title of Marshal of Romania, as a recognition of his merits during his command of the Northern Army and of the General Staff.

Besides his participation in World War I, he also took part in the Second Balkan War and the 1918–1920 military operations for safeguarding the Great Union. He avoided getting actively involved in politics, although he had a series of political titles, which were rather honorary in nature. For instance, he held the title of senator by right, based on his high rank in the army, and that of member of the Crown Council of Romania.

== Biography ==
He was born in the village of Sterianul de Mijloc, plasa Snagov, Ilfov County, currently in Butimanu commune, Dâmbovița County. He graduated from the officers' infantry and cavalry school in Bucharest and the École spéciale militaire de Saint-Cyr. Made a second lieutenant in 1880, he rose to captain in 1887. A military engineering specialist, he took part in the Second Balkan War.

General Prezan commanded the 4th Army Corps in 1915-1916, and then became head of the Romanian Fourth Army during the Romanian Campaign later in 1916, against the forces of the Central Powers. Prezan led the Romanian Armed Forces in the Battle of Bucharest (November–December 1916), and as those forces retreated into the northeastern part of Romania (Moldavia). In July and August 1917, Prezan, who was by then Chief of the General Staff (and assisted by the then-Lieutenant-Colonel Ion Antonescu) successfully stopped the German invasion led by Field Marshal August von Mackensen. He continued serving in this position until 1920.

Documents found in military archives have brought to light Prezan's role in creating the Romanian National State. In October 1916, Prezan was rewarded with the Order of Michael the Brave, Third Class for deeds of merit, courage, and devotion. In July 1917, when he commanded the General Army Quarters, Prezan was honoured with the Order of Michael the Brave, Second Class.

During the Hungarian–Romanian War (November 1918–March 1920), Prezan led the Romanian Armed Forces in the battles of Bessarabia, Bukovina, and Transylvania. For his outstanding service, King Ferdinand I awarded him in February 1920 the Order of Michael the Brave, First Class. Prezan was promoted to Marshal of Romania in 1930.

In 1917 Prezan was awarded the Legion of Honour, Grand Officer. He was also awarded the Order of the Cross of Takovo and a number of other decorations.

In 1920 he was moved to the military reserve force, and spent most of his time at his villa in Schinetea, Vaslui County. He died în 1943 in Bucharest, and was buried at his residence in Schinetea. A major boulevard in Bucharest (running from Arcul de Triumf to Charles de Gaulle Square) is named after him.
