= Ghimeș-Făget =

Ghimeș-Făget Gyimesbükk
- Commune
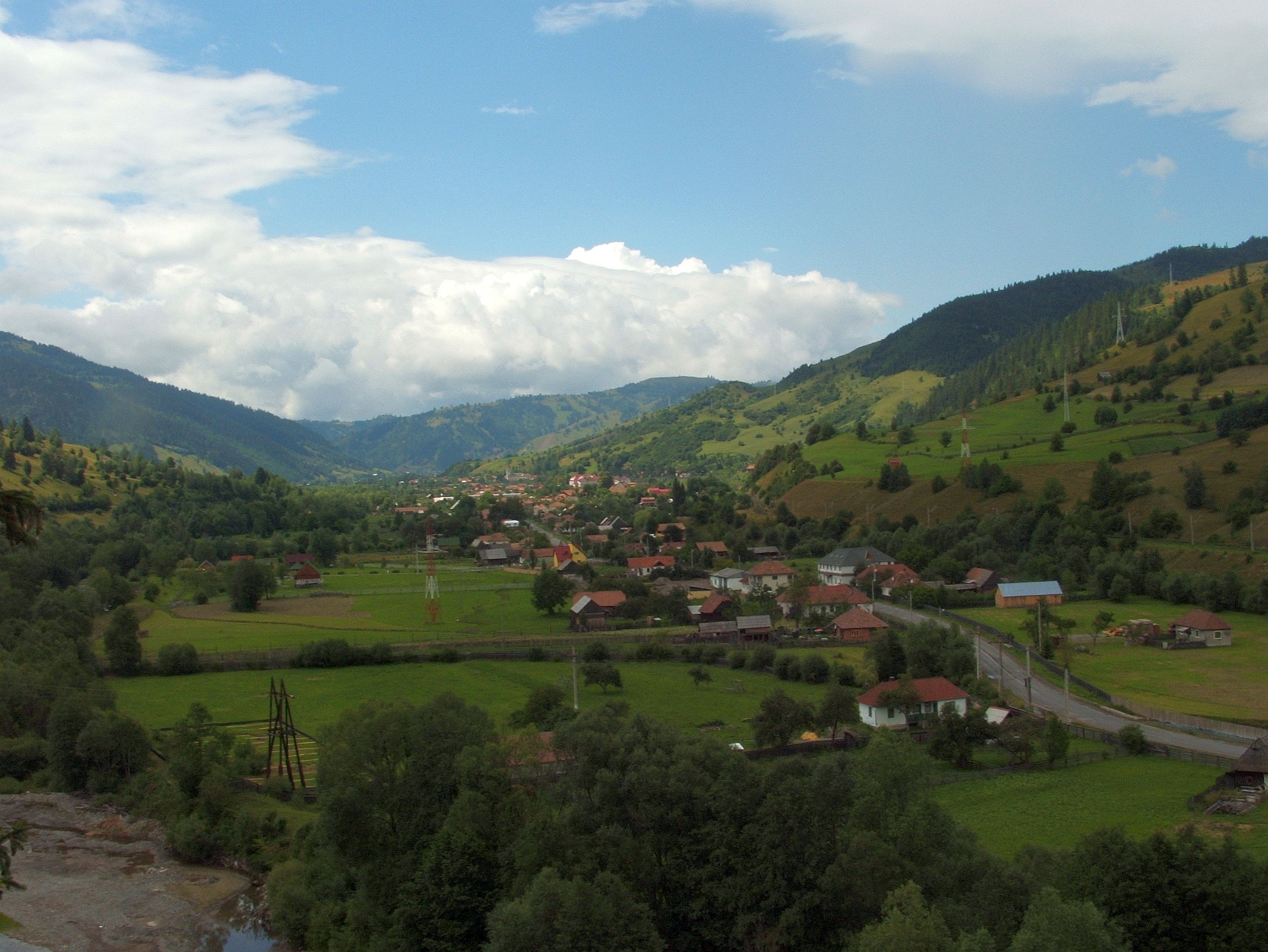

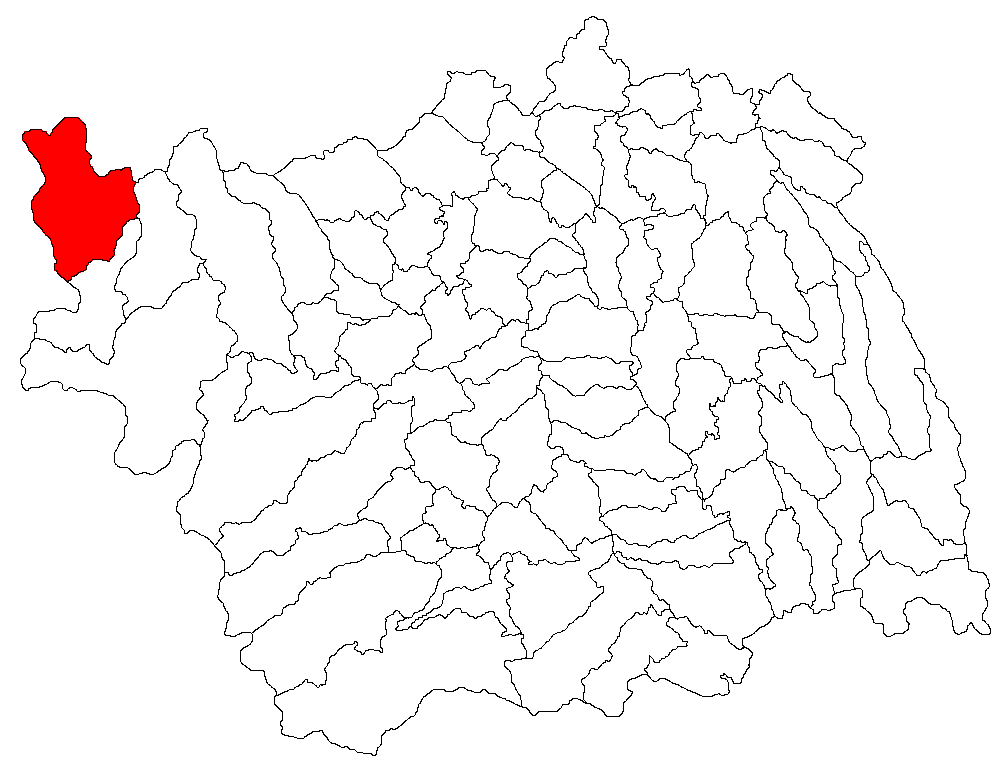
- Location in Bacău County

- Location in Romania
- Coordinates: 46°35′N 26°4′E
- Country: Romania
- County: Bacău

Government
  - Mayor (2020–2024): Péter Oltean (UDMR)
- Area: 184.85 km^{2} (71.37 sq mi)
- Elevation: 745 m (2,444 ft)
- Population (2021-12-01): 4,928
  - Density: 26.66/km^{2} (69.05/sq mi)
- Time zone: UTC+02:00 (EET)
  - Summer (DST): UTC+03:00 (EEST)
- Postal code: 607205
- Area code: +(40) 234
- Vehicle reg.: BC
- Website: comunaghimes-faget.ro

Ghimeș-Făget (Hungarian: Gyimesbükk, pronounced: [ˈɟimɛʃbykk], or sometimes Nagy-Gyimes) is a commune in Bacău County, Romania. It is the only commune in the county that lies in the historical region of Transylvania.

The commune, the seat of which is the village of Făget, is composed of six villages: Bolovăniș (Bálványospataka), Făget (Bükk), Făgetu de Sus (Felsőbükk), Ghimeș (Gyimes), Răchitiș (Rakottyástelep), and Tărhăuși (Tarhavaspataka).

== History ==
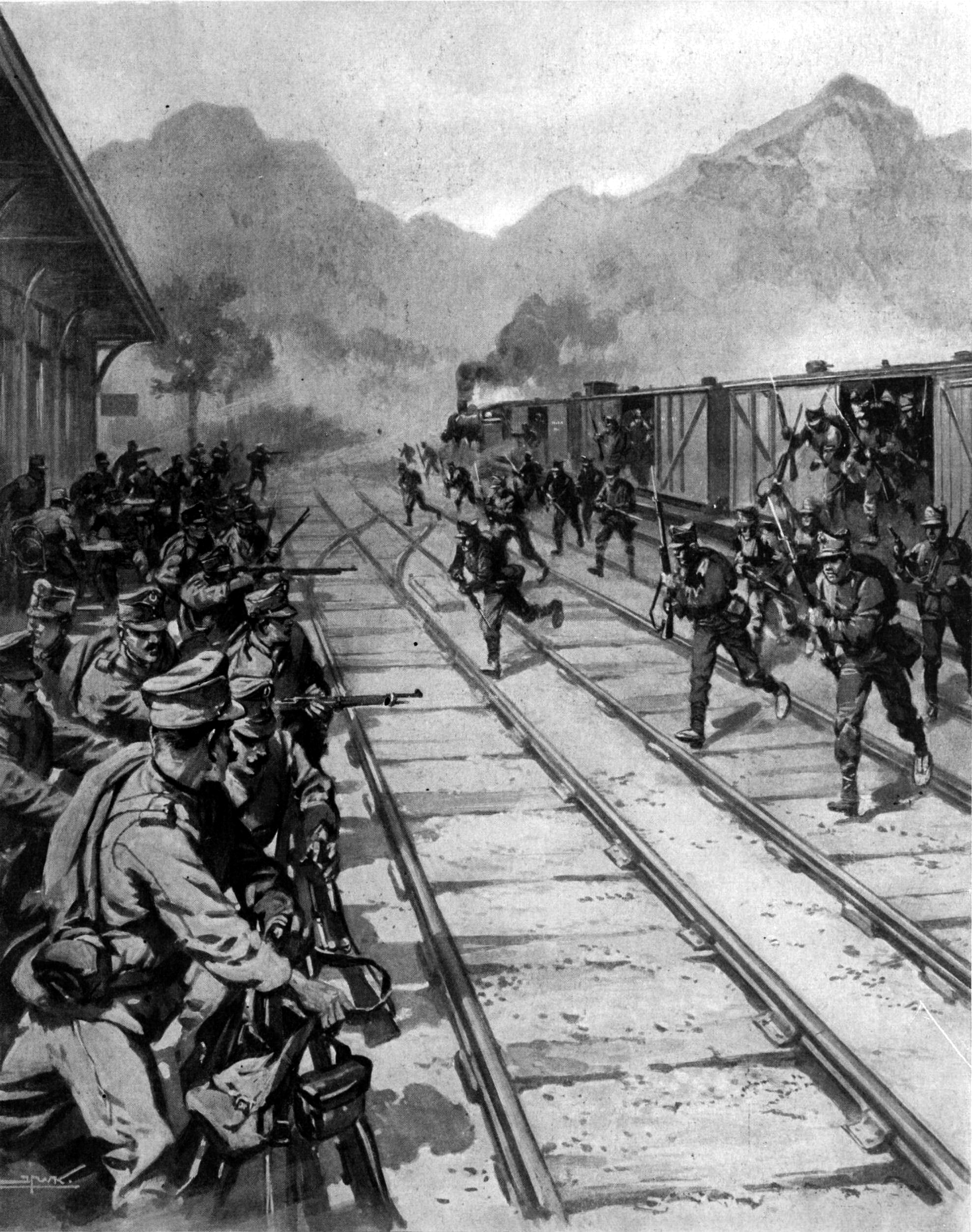
Romanian soldiers surprising the Austro-Hungarians at the Ghimeș-Făget railway station, 21 October 1916

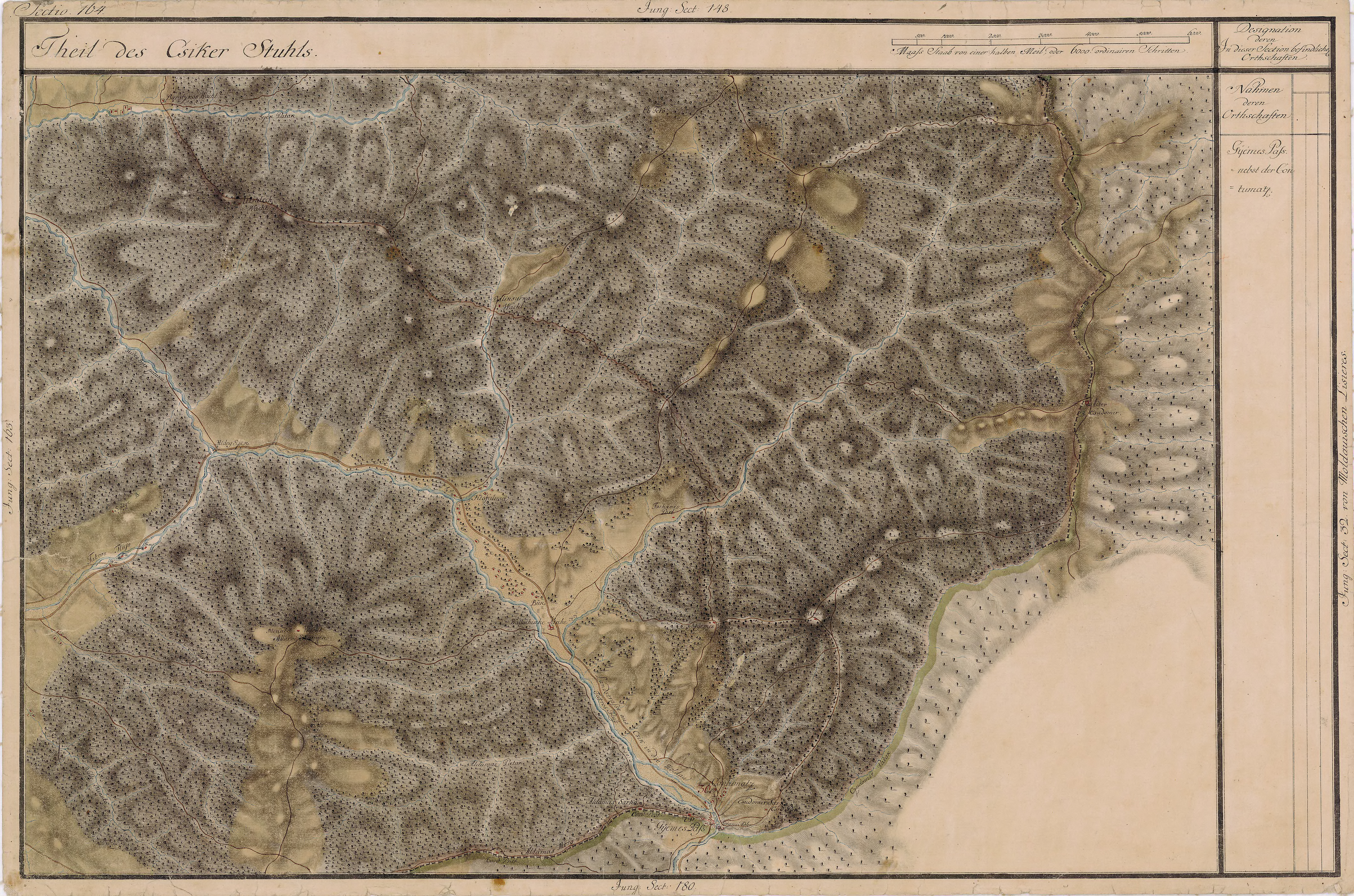
The area around 1770 (Josephine land survey)

The village was part of the Székely Land region of the historical Transylvania province. It was first mentioned in 1600 as Gijmes. The area of the commune belonged to Csíkszék until the administrative reform of Transylvania in 1876, when it fell within the Csík County of the Kingdom of Hungary. During that time, it was a border village between Hungary and Romania and as such, it had an important and large railway station designed by Hungarian architect Ferenc Pfaff. The main building of the station was 102 m (335 ft) long and 13 m (43 ft) wide, comparable in size and elegance with the railway stations of Szeged and Fiume.

In late August 1916, Romania entered World War I on the side of the Allies; the Romanian 4th Army under the command of Constantin Prezan crossed into Transylvania at Ghimeș-Făget and fought against the armies of Austria-Hungary and Germany, but had to retreat by mid-October (see Northern front of the Battle of Transylvania). At the end of the war, the village was occupied by the Romanian Army between 13 and 20 November 1918. Shortly thereafter, the Union of Transylvania with Romania was proclaimed. During the Hungarian–Romanian War of 1918–1919, Ghimeș-Făget passed under Romanian administration; after the Treaty of Trianon of 1920, like the rest of Transylvania, it became part of the Kingdom of Romania. During the interwar period, the commune became part of plasa Frumoasa in Ciuc County. In 1940, the Second Vienna Award granted Northern Transylvania to Hungary and the commune was held by Hungary until September 1944. The territory of Northern Transylvania remained under Soviet military administration until March 9, 1945, after which it became again part of Romania.

In 1950, as part of a wider administrative reform, the commune was transferred from Ciuc County to Bacău Region. In 1968, the region was abolished, and since then, the commune has been part of Bacău County. School education in the Hungarian language was abolished in 1965. Local teacher and school director András Deáky advocated for teaching in Hungarian and re-organized it after 1990. He also established a Hungarian language library from donations of the public.

== Demography ==
At the 2011 census, the commune had a population of 5,094; out of them, 2,578 (51%) were Hungarians, 2,282 (45%) were Romanians, 101 (2%) were Roma and 48 (1%) were Csángós. 59% had Hungarian as first language, and 39% Romanian. As to religion, 59% of the commune population were Roman Catholic, while 39% of them belonged to the Romanian Orthodox Church. At the 2021 census, Ghimeș-Făget had a population of 4,928; of those, 53.51% were Hungarians and 42.57% Romanians.

== Landmarks ==
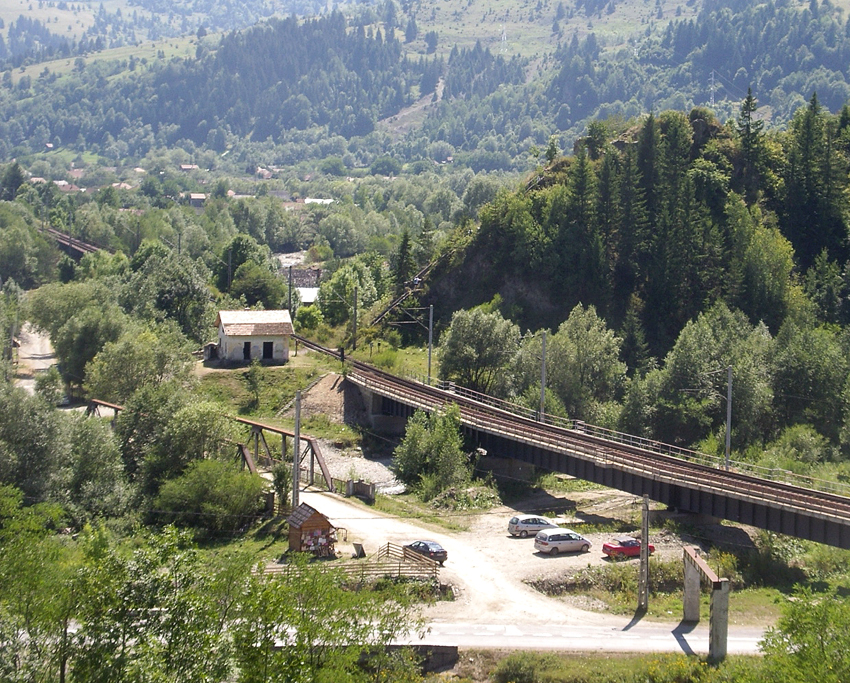
The Ghimeș-Palanca Pass. At the bottom: the new road and the bridge of the old road. Near the railway line: the former Austro-Hungarian customs house. Beyond it: the "Stone Nose" hill with the ruins of the Rákóczi castle

- On the right side of the Ghimeș-Palanca Pass, on the pre-World War I Hungarian-Romanian border, stand the ruins of the Rákóczi Castle. It was built in 1626 upon the order ofprince Gabriel Bethlen. Later it was strengthened several times, but today it lays in ruins.
- The old Roman Catholic church was built in 1782. Its extant registers go back to 1785.
- The new Roman Catholic church was built in 1976, thanks to the efforts of parish priest Dani Gergely. It is decorated with frescoes made by Magda Lukásovics.
- In its vicinity, 3 Austro-Hungarian stone landmarks can still be seen (beyond the Rákóczi Castle, following the ridge).
- At the foot of the Rákóczi Castle stands the railway guard house no. 30, the easternmost railway guardhouse of the pre-World War I Kingdom of Hungary.
- A Csango country house set up by the ethnographer Maria Tankó Antalné.
