= Palanca, Bacău =

Palanca
- Commune
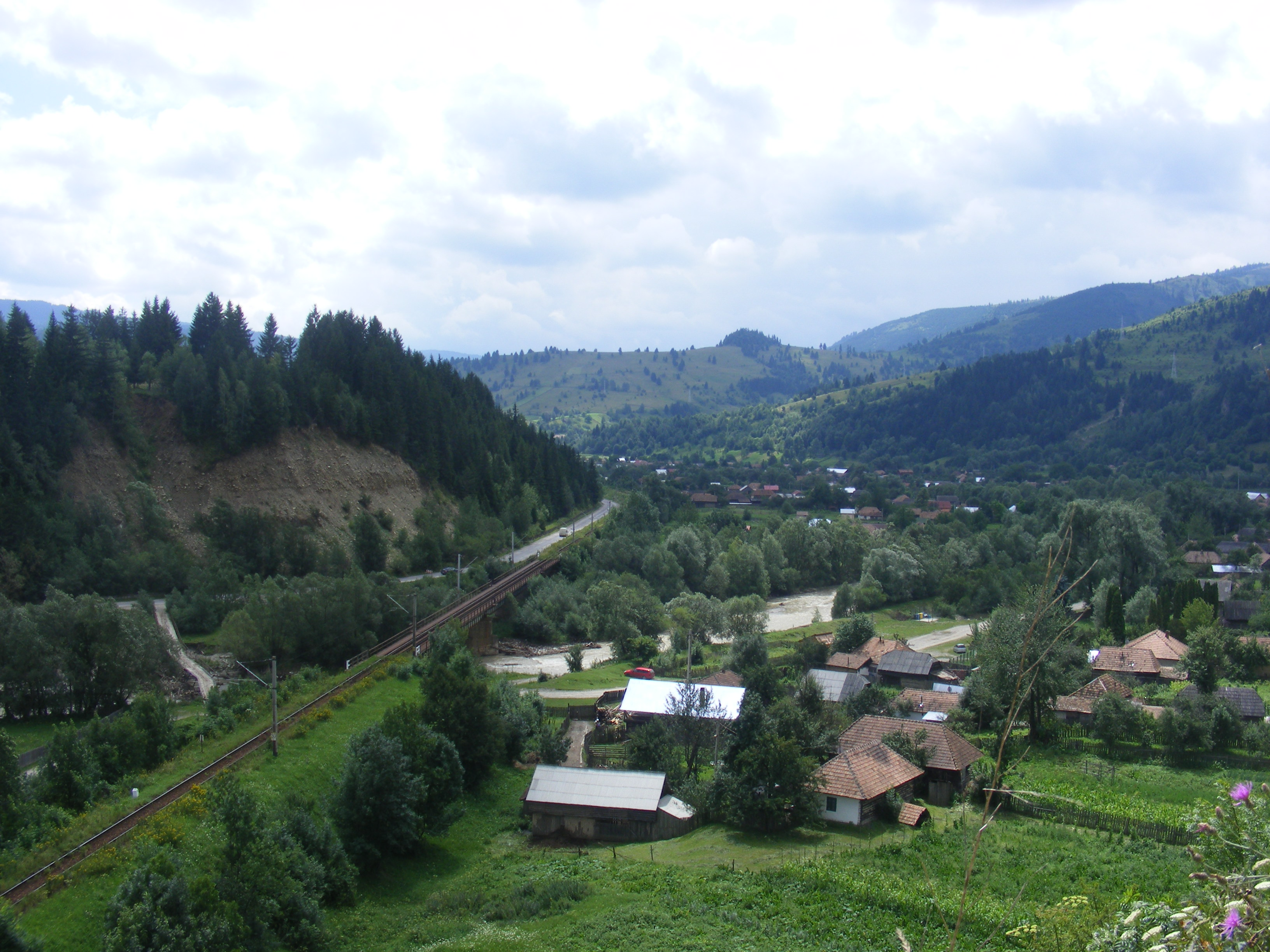
- View of Palanca, with road and railway running towards the Ghimeș-Palanca Pass

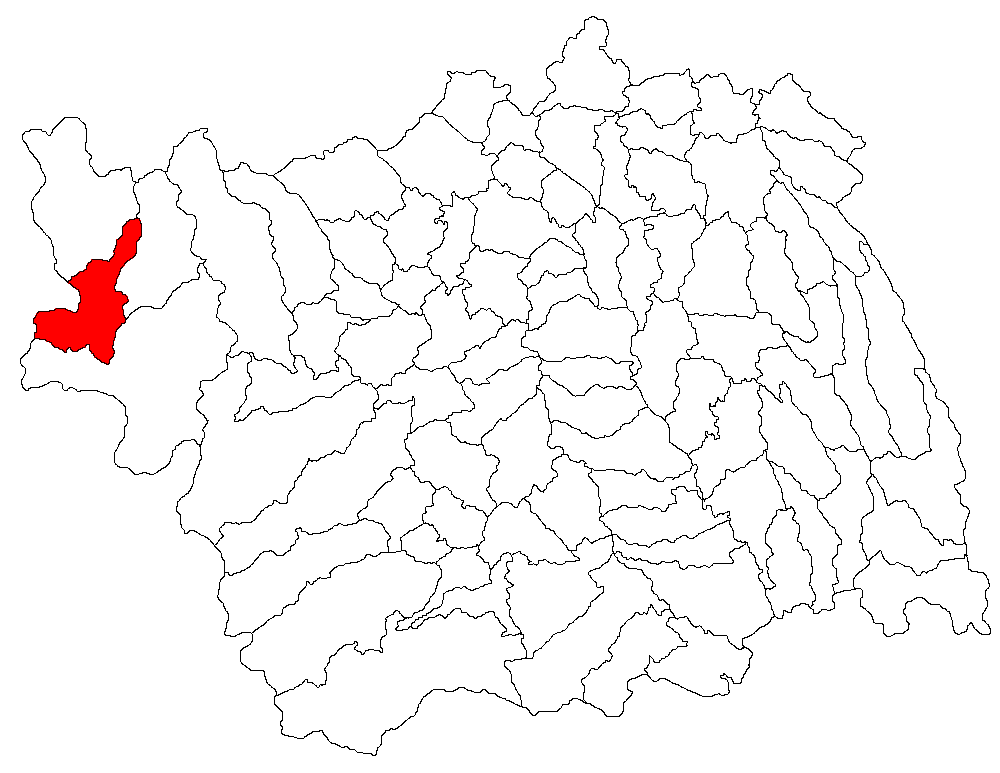
- Location in Bacău County

- Location in Romania
- Coordinates: 46°32′N 26°7′E
- Country: Romania
- County: Bacău

Government
  - Mayor (2020–2024): Adrian Paliștan (PSD)
- Area: 110 km^{2} (42 sq mi)
- Elevation: 644 m (2,113 ft)
- Population (2021-12-01): 3,065
  - Density: 28/km^{2} (72/sq mi)
- Time zone: UTC+02:00 (EET)
  - Summer (DST): UTC+03:00 (EEST)
- Postal code: 607390
- Area code: +(40) 234
- Vehicle reg.: BC
- Website: comunapalanca.ro

Palanca (Hungarian: Palánka) is a commune in Bacău County, Western Moldavia, Romania. It is composed of five villages: Cădărești (Magyarcsügés), Ciugheș (Oláhcsügés), Pajiștea (Gyepece), Palanca, and Popoiu.

== Location ==
The commune is situated in the southern foothills of the Tarcău Mountains, at the eastern end of the Ghimeș-Palanca Pass, which connects Moldavia to Transylvania. It lies at altitude of 644 m (2,113 ft), on the banks of the river Trotuș and its right tributary, the Ciugheș.

Palanca is located in the western part of Bacău County, 80 km (50 mi) from the county seat, Bacău, on the border with Harghita County. It is traversed by national road DN12A, which starts in Onești, 57 km (35 mi) to the southeast, continues over the mountain pass to Ghimeș-Făget, and ends in Miercurea Ciuc. The Palanca halt serves the CFR railway line 501, which runs parallel with the road and connects Adjud to Siculeni.

== Demographics ==
According to the 2002 census, the commune had 3,764 inhabitants; of those, 99.5% were Romanians and 0.5% Hungarians, 60.3% were Romanian Orthodox and 39.7% Roman Catholic. At the 2011 census, the population had decreased to 3,319, with 96.9% Romanians, while at the 2021 census, there were 3,065 inhabitants, with 94.3% Romanians.

== Natives ==
- Marius Corbu (born 2002), footballer
