= Mărăști =

Mărăşti may refer to:

== Places in Romania ==
- Mărăști, Cluj-Napoca, a district of Cluj-Napoca
- Mărăşti, a village in Răcoasa Commune, Vrancea County
  - The location of the Battle of Mărăşti
- Mărăști, a village in Filipeni Commune, Bacău County

== Other uses ==
- Mărăşti River, a tributary of the river Șușița in Romania
- NMS Mărăști, a World War II Romanian destroyer

== See also ==
- Mărășești (disambiguation)
- Maraština, a white grape variety
