= Câmpuri =

- Commune
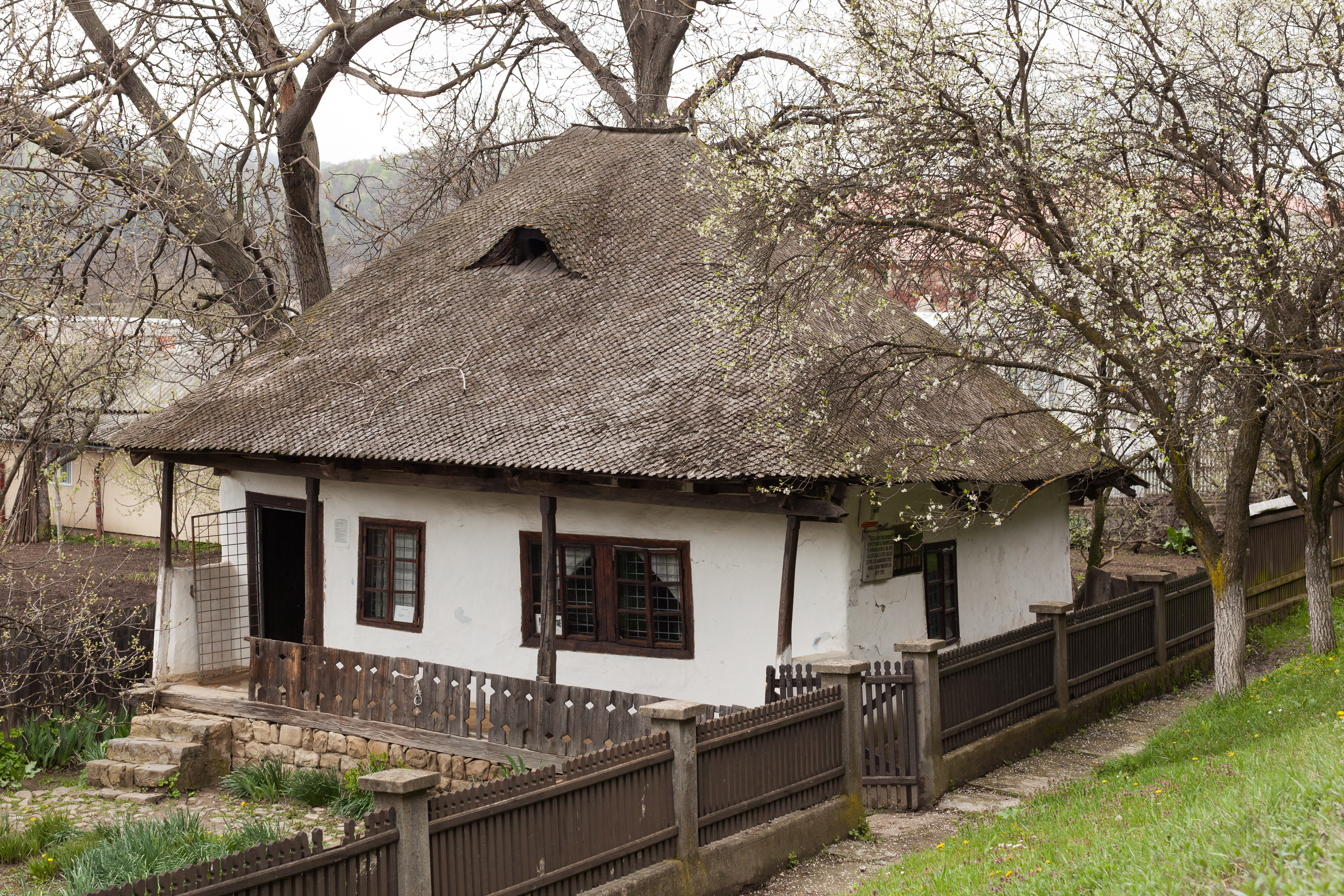
- Moș Ion Roată memorial house

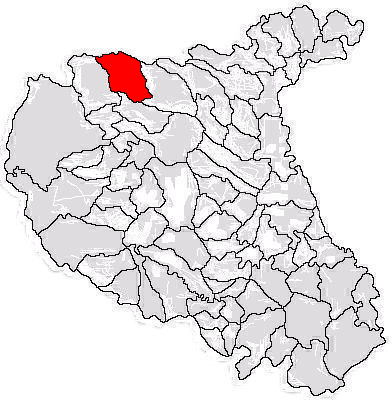
- Location in Vrancea County

- Location in Romania
- Coordinates: 46°03′N 26°44′E
- Country: Romania
- County: Vrancea

Government
  - Mayor (2024–2028): Ion Vlad (PSD)
- Area: 88.27 km^{2} (34.08 sq mi)
- Elevation: 370 m (1,210 ft)
- Population (2021-12-01): 3,443
  - Density: 39.01/km^{2} (101.0/sq mi)
- Time zone: UTC+02:00 (EET)
  - Summer (DST): UTC+03:00 (EEST)
- Postal code: 627060
- Area code: +(40) x37
- Vehicle reg.: VN
- Website: www.primariacimpurivn.ro

Câmpuri is a commune located in Vrancea County, Romania. It is composed of five villages: Câmpuri, Fetești, Gura Văii, Rotileștii Mari, and Rotileștii Mici.

The commune is located in the northern part of the county, on the border with Bacău County. It lies on the banks of the river Șușița and its tributaries, Cremeneț and Dracea Mică. Câmpuri is crossed by the national road DN2L which connects it to the west to Soveja and Tulnici and to the southeast to Răcoasa, Străoane, Panciu, and Mărășești (where it ends in DN2). The county capital, Focșani, is 56 km (35 mi) to the southeast via route DN2D.

In July 1917, part of the Battle of Mărăști was fought in this area.

Historical population
Year	Pop.	±%
2002	3,990	—
2011	3,475	−12.9%
2021	3,443	−0.9%
Source: Census data

== Natives ==
- Gina Gogean (born 1977), artistic gymnast
- Ion Roată (1806–1882), peasant and political figure; he was born in Câmpuri and died in Gura Văii
