= Verdea =

Verdea may refer to

== Places ==
- Verdea, a village in Sutești Commune, Vâlcea County, Romania
- Verdea, a village in Răcoasa Commune, Vrancea County, Romania

== Wine grapes ==
- Verdea (grape), a white Italian wine grape from Lombardy
- Verdeca, an Italian wine grape also known as Verdea
- Verdesse, another Italian wine grape also known as Verdea
- Vernaccia, an Italian wine grape that is also known as Verdea d'Arcetri

== Rivers ==
- A tributary of the Șușița in Vrancea County, Romania
- A tributary of the Săraz in Timiș County, Romania
