= Hungary in World War I =

At the outbreak of World War I in August 1914, Hungary was part of the Dual Monarchy of Austria-Hungary. Although there are no significant battles specifically connected to Hungarian regiments, the troops suffered high losses throughout the war as the Empire suffered defeat after defeat. The result was the breakup of the Empire and eventually, Hungary suffered severe territorial losses by the closing Trianon Peace Treaty.

== The Empire at the outbreak of the war ==
In 1914, Austria-Hungary was one of the great powers of Europe, with an area of 676,443 km^{2} and a population of 52 million, of which Hungary had 325,400 km^{2} with population of 21 million.

By 1913, the combined length of the railway tracks of the Austrian Empire and Kingdom of Hungary reached 43,280 kilometres (26,890 miles). In Western Europe only Germany had more extended railway network (63,378 km, 39,381 mi); the Austro-Hungarian Empire was followed by France (40,770 km, 25,330 mi), the United Kingdom (32,623 km, 20,271 mi), Italy (18,873 km, 11,727 mi) and Spain (15,088 km, 9,375 mi). By 1910, the total length of the rail networks of Hungarian Kingdom reached 22,869 kilometres (14,210 miles), the Hungarian network linked more than 1,490 settlements. Nearly half (52%) of the empire's railways were built in Hungary, thus the railroad density there became higher than that of Cisleithania. This ranked Hungarian railways the 6th most dense in the world (ahead of Germany and France).

The Austro-Hungarian Empire conscripted 7.8 million soldiers during World War I. Although the Kingdom of Hungary comprised only 42% of the population of Austria-Hungary, the thin majority – more than 3.8 million soldiers – of the Austro-Hungarian armed forces were conscripted from the Kingdom of Hungary during the First World War.

Austria-Hungary was more urbanized (25%) than its main direct opponents in the First World War, like the Russian Empire (13.4%), Serbia (13.2%) and Romania (18.8%). Furthermore, the Austro-Hungarian Empire also had a more industrialized economy and higher GDP per capita than the Kingdom of Italy, which was economically the most developed opponent of the Empire by far.

On 28 June 1914 Gavrilo Princip assassinated Archduke Franz Ferdinand of Austria. Before entering the war, only the prime minister Count István Tisza hesitated, unconvinced that it was the best time to engage in battle. As soon as Germany promised to neutralize the Kingdom of Romania and promised that no territories of the Kingdom of Serbia would be annexed to Austria-Hungary, he then decided to support the war.

After the ultimatum sent to Serbia by Franz Joseph I, the war broke out and soon spread over much of Europe and beyond.

== The army of Austria-Hungary in 1914 ==
The first line of this multi-ethnic army was based and consisted of:

- The so-called "common" army and "common" navy, where the language was German, and was 87% of the total army
- The Landwehr of the Austrian army
- The Royal Hungarian "honvédség", where the language was Hungarian and Croatian.

The second line of the army was the mobilized

- Landsturm of the Austrians
- Népfelkelés ('Folk uprising') of Hungarians.

In 1914, the Austro-Hungarian army was facing its greatest challenge so far in history. After mobilisation, the armed forces were grouped into six armies, totaling 3.2 million soldiers. Between 1914 and 1918, 9 million served in the army (7.8 million in the fighting forces).

In comparison to the other armies of Western Europe, Hungary's experienced veteran armed forces, technical equipment, and military expenditures were underdeveloped. The artillery was insufficient, but it was heavily developed later in the war. The correct supply of ammunition was not solved even by the end of the war. The armed forces lacked an adequate air force: it had only 42 military and 40 sport aeroplanes before the war. Unifying the multi-ethnic units was also a serious problem for the military's leaders.

== Hungarian participation ==
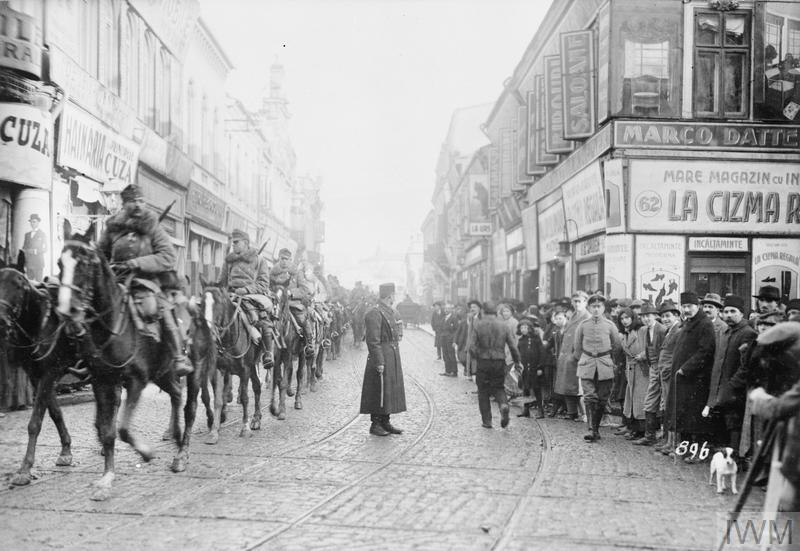
Austro-Hungarian cavalry entering Bucharest on 6 December 1916

The military forces of Austria-Hungary remained largely unified over the course of the war, in spite of their multi-ethnic nature and some expectations to the contrary. While German support was undoubtedly critical to the success of various offensives (such as the Gorlice–Tarnów offensive and the Battle of Caporetto), the multi-ethnic armies of Austria-Hungary proved fully capable in a defensive role in all the theaters of the war in which they were engaged.

The predominantly ethnic German commanders of the army generally favoured troops of German extraction, but ethnic Hungarian troops were also seen as being reliable and were widely used on the front lines, especially on the Russian front and Italian front. For the most part, troops from other ethnic groups within the empire were less likely to be placed in strategically critical positions and therefore had lower casualties.

Over the course of World War I there was never a documented offensive by purely ethnic Hungarian troops, but such troops did contribute positively to the outcome of various battles, as follows:

- On 3–15 December 1914 during the Battle of Limanowa, the "Russian steamroller" was held back, especially by the hussars. Lieutenant-general Josef Roth attacked the Russian 3rd army, and on the right wing, the 10th Budapest and 11th Debrecen cavalry divisions engaged in a man-to-man fight and were decisive. On December 11, colonel Ottmár Muhr died in a heroic defense leading the Sopron 9th cavalry regiment. Lieutenant-general Artur Arz, together with lieutenant-general Imre Hadfy, leading the 39th Kassa division, destroyed the 15th Russian division in Livno.
- During the Siege of Przemysl, which defense was commanded by general Hermann Kusmanek, the main defence line, consisting of Hungarian troops, guarded the fortress for five months from November 1915. The defenders were commanded by Árpád Tamásy, leading the 23rd Szeged division. After the depletion of ammunition and food reserves, Przemysl capitulated, leaving 120,000 prisoners of war.
- On the Isonzo front, Hungarian forces participated in all twelve battles. On the Doberdo plateau and near Karst, the most serious battles were fought by Hungarians, who composed one third of the total armed forces. In particular, the 20th Nagyvárad and 17th Budapest common regiments distinguished themselves. On 15 June 1918, near the river Piave, the 6th army commanded by Archduke József Ágost took over most part of mount Montello and held it until the end of the war. Decisive fights were carried out by the 31st Budapest common regiment and the 11th Debrecen division.

The troops raised in the Kingdom of Hungary spent little time defending the actual territory of Hungary, with the exceptions of the Brusilov Offensive in June 1916, and a few months later, when the Romanian army invaded Transylvania, both of which were repelled. A small number of troops from Austria-Hungary also fought in more distant theaters of war that are beyond the borders of Austria-Hungary, including the Gallipoli campaign, and in the Sinai Peninsula and Palestine.

== Military leaders ==
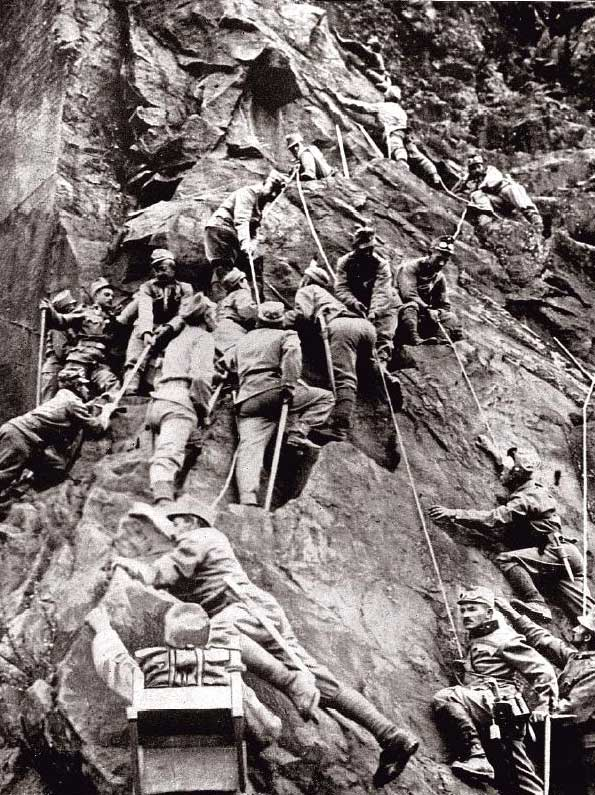
Austro-Hungarian mountain corps in Tyrol

Some military leaders who have received the Commander's Cross of the Military Order of Maria Theresa, the most renowned medal:

- Colonel-General Arthur Arz von Straussenburg
  - 1914 December – Battle of Limanowa
  - 1915 May – Gorlice-Tarnow Offensive, leading legion Kassa 6.
  - 1916 October – leading 1st army, defending Transylvania from Romanian forces
- Archduke Joseph August of Austria
  - 1915 – during the 2–4 Battle of the Isonzo, he defended Doberdo plateau
  - 1916 December – constable of army, successful offensives in the Russian front
- Field-marshal Hermann Kövess von Kövessháza
  - 1915 August – leading legion Nagyszeben 12., he captured Iwanogród
  - 1915 October – commander of 3rd army, occupied Kingdom of Serbia
  - 1916 January–February – occupied Montenegro and north of Albania

== Losses ==
Military deaths of the Central Powers.

Out of over 2.2 million men mobilized in Austria-Hungary, more than one million died during the course of the war. In Hungarian areas, this meant a death rate of twenty-eight per thousand persons – a level of loss exceeded within Austria-Hungary only by German Austrians. In comparison to the total army, Hungary's loss ratio was more than any other nation of Austria-Hungary. There could be two possible causes: Hungary was more an agricultural country, where it is easier to mobilize forces, rather than from more industrialized territories (i.e. Bohemia), and secondly, the Hungarian soldiers were considered to be more trustworthy and disciplined than soldiers from other ethnic groups.

== The war aims of Hungary ==
In contrast to the cases of Germany, France or Italy, the question of World War I aims of Hungary remains almost unexplored. However, as the Kingdom of Hungary was the most politically stable part of the Habsburg Monarchy, it strongly impacted the Dual Monarchy's war plans. The main concerns of the government in Budapest were directed by fears for the territorial integrity of Hungary. In July 1914, its Prime Minister, István Tisza, convinced the Monarchy's Crown Council not to demand new territories from Serbia. In parallel, the Hungarian opposition secretly informed the Entente that an independent Hungary could be proclaimed, ready to sign a separate peace treaty if her frontiers were guaranteed. An opposition leader, Mihály Károlyi, entered into contacts with Italians, British and French. In the autumn of 1915, with the Austro-Hungarian army's successes, the secessionist moods in Budapest cooled down. Hungarian politicians turned towards the annexation of Northern Serbia, and possibly Montenegro. When Austria envisaged the amalgamation of Poland, Tisza insisted in Vienna to include Bosnia-Hercegovina (and probably Dalmatia) in Hungary. However, when Romania declared war on the Habsburg Monarchy in August 1916, the Tisza government anticipated annexations of Romanian lands, whereas the Hungarian radical opposition in the parliament (independentists, led by Mihály Károlyi), reinforced the separatist propaganda. In March 1917, Tisza proposed to the Crown Council of the Monarchy to divide Romania between Hungary and Russia, leaving a small Romanian buffer State. Yet, according to the Bucharest Peace Treaty (7 May 1918), Romania only ceded the Carpathian mountain passes to Hungary. The next "success" of Hungarian territorial expansionism was the Habsburg approval of the attachment of Bosnia-Herzegovina and Dalmatia to the Kingdom in October 1918. Expecting the collapse of the Central Powers, Károlyi was allowed by the Emperor-King to form a government in Budapest. This government declared the independence of Hungary on 31 October 1918. However, it did not stop the Entente and its allies from raising territorial claims against Hungary. They finally gave three quarters of pre-war Hungary to surrounding countries by the Peace Treaty of Trianon (4 June 1920).

== Aftermath ==
On 11 November 1918, World War I ended for Austria-Hungary, though at the time of the collapse, all forces were standing outside the borders of 1914. With the collapse of the army, Austria-Hungary also collapsed. The political leaders of the ethnic groups of the Kingdom of Hungary called for independent nation-states.

When Oszkár Jászi became the new Minister for National Minorities of Hungary, he immediately offered democratic referendums for minorities about the disputed borders; however, the political leaders of those minorities refused the very idea of such referendums at the Paris peace conference.

By the Treaty of Trianon, signed on 4 June 1920, Hungary lost about two-thirds of her territory and more than half of its population. This was a larger loss of territory than any other country at that time (excluding colonies). Around 8 million Hungarians remained in post-Trianon Hungary, while more than 3 million Hungarians were stranded outside the newly established borders. Newly established countries such as Czechoslovakia, Poland and the Kingdom of Serbs, Croats and Slovenes were established, and some already-existing countries extended their territories (Italy and Romania). The southern part of Hungary was given to the Kingdom of Serbs, Croats and Slovenes. Croatia was also incorporated into it after more than 800-year personal union with Hungary. 102,813 square kilometers—the whole of Eastern Hungary and Transylvania—were awarded by the Entente to Romania, more than the remaining area of Hungary itself (93,030 km^{2}). The northern part of Hungary was annexed by the newly created Czechoslovakia. Austria also received territories from Western Hungary.

After World War I, despite the "self-determination of peoples" idea of the Allied Powers, only one plebiscite was permitted (later known as the Sopron plebiscite) to settle disputed borders on the former territory of the Kingdom of Hungary, settling a smaller territorial dispute between the First Austrian Republic and the Kingdom of Hungary. During the Sopron plebiscite in late 1921, the polling stations were supervised by British, French, and Italian army officers of the Allied Powers.

Hungary was crippled after losing its status as a Great Power. The newly created or greatly enlarged states formed the Little Entente after the war, encircling Hungary in order to make border revision impossible. The Army was reduced to a mere 30,000 troops; Hungary was forbidden to have an air force, tanks, and any sophisticated weapons. The borders were set in such a way that all natural defense lines were crossed, making the remaining territory vulnerable to invasion.

== See also ==
- Diplomatic history of World War I
- Aftermath of World War I
