= Chiua =

- Location within Romania

Location
- Country: Romania
- Counties: Vrancea County

Physical characteristics
- Mouth: Șușița
  - location: Downstream of Dragosloveni
  - coordinates: 46°0′48″N 26°40′57″E
  - elevation: 458 m (1,503 ft)

Basin features
- Progression: Șușița→ Siret→ Danube→ Black Sea
- Tributaries
  - right: Chiua Mică

The Chiua (also: Chiua Mare) is a left tributary of the river Șușița in Romania. It discharges into the Șușița near Dragosloveni. Its length is 7 km (4.3 mi) and its basin size is 16 km^{2} (6.2 sq mi).
