= Battle of Mărăști =

First World War battle in Romania

- Part of the 1917 Romanian Campaign of World War I
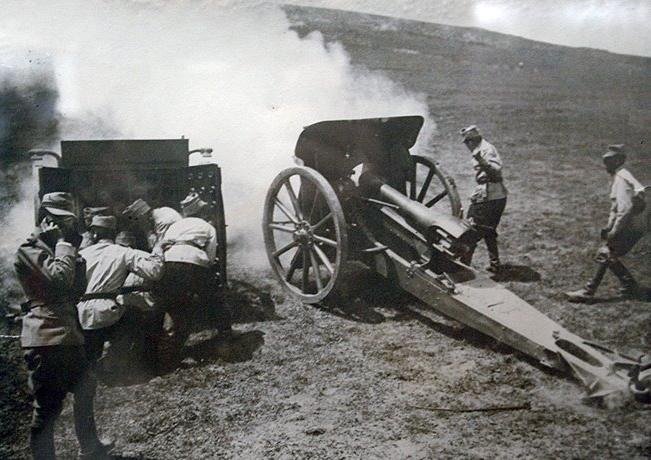
- Romanian Model 1912 105 mm howitzers firing during the Battle of Mărăști
Date	22 July – 1 August 1917
Location	Mărăști, Eastern Romania
Result	Romanian–Russian victory

Belligerents
Romania; Russia	German Empire; Austria-Hungary

Commanders and leaders
(Kingdom of Romania) Alexandru Averescu; Dmitry Shcherbachev	(German Empire) Friedrich von Gerok (Austria-Hungary) Franz Rohr von Denta

Units involved
(Kingdom of Romania) Romanian 2nd Army (Russian Republic) 4th Russian Army (Russian Republic) 9th Russian Army	(German Empire) German 9th Army (Austria-Hungary) 1st Austro-Hungarian Army

Strength
56 infantry battalions 14 cavalry squadrons 228 batteries (52 heavy); 12 air squadrons	28 infantry battalions 36 cavalry squadrons 142 batteries (6 heavy)

Casualties and losses
4,879 casualties (1,460 killed; 3,419 wounded or missing)	9,600 casualties (2,200 killed; 4,700 wounded or missing; 2,700 captured)

The Battle of Mărăști (Romanian: Bătălia de la Mărăști) was one of the main battles to take place on Romanian soil in World War I. It was fought between 22 July and 1 August 1917, and was an offensive operation of the Romanian and Russian armies intended to encircle and destroy the German 9th Army. The operation was planned to occur in tandem with the Nămoloasa offensive; however, this operation was abandoned before it began.

According to General Alexandru Averescu, the commander of the Romanian Second Army at this major engagement, the Battle of Mărăști was the "first true victory in the history of the modern Romanian Army".

== Background ==
Mărăști, just like Mărășești, is part of the strategically important Focșani Gate, the control of which eases attacks into several Romanian regions.

== The opposing forces ==
At the beginning of July 1917, based on the campaign plan drawn up in May by the High Command, final instructions were given to the 1st and 2nd Romanian Armies. The 1st Army, commanded by General Constantin Cristescu, was to carry out the principal attack around Nămoloasa and then, on terrain prepared by the latter, the 2nd Army, commanded by General Alexandru Averescu, was to carry out a second-order attack toward Mărăști. The objective of the operation — the retaking of enemy positions from the Poiana Încărcătoarea–Răcoasa sector — was contained in Operations Order Nr. 1638.

Altogether the opposing sides were rather evenly matched, although the Romanian High Command had massed additional forces along the direction of the attacks planned for the 2nd Army, thus creating a more advantageous force equilibrium for Romania.

The combat units were as follows:

The 2nd Romanian Army had the following battle formations:

- 1st Order
  - 4th Army Corps - commanded by Brigadier General Gheorghe Văleanu
    - 8th Infantry Division – commanded by Brigadier General Ioan Pătrașcu
    - 11th Brigade from the 6th Infantry Division
  - In reserve:
    - 6th Infantry Division less the 11th Brigade – commanded by Brigadier General Nicolae Arghirescu
    - 10th Vânători Regiment
    - 3rd Battalion from the 24th Infantry Regiment
  - 2nd Army Corps – commanded by General Artur Văitoianu
    - 1st Infantry Division – commanded by Brigadier General Dumitru Stratilescu
    - 3rd Infantry Division – commanded by Brigadier General Alexandru Mărgineanu
    - 6th Infantry Division less the 11th Brigade from the 4th Reserve Corps
- 2nd Order
  - 1st Infantry Division less the 18th Regiment
  - 2 mountain artillery divisions
  - 1 heavy artillery division (152 mm)
  - 7 long cannon batteries and shell launchers

The Gerok Group contained the following formations of the German 9th Army and the 1st Austro-Hungarian Army:

- 8th Army Corps (to the north)
  - 8th mountain brigade and 112th infantry brigade of the Imperial German Army
  - 2 battalions from the 71st and 72nd infantry division of the Austro-Hungarian Army
  - 1 cavalry brigade
  - 2 infantry divisions
- Ruiz Corps (to the south)
  - 218th German infantry division
  - 1st Austro-Hungarian cavalry division
- In reserve:
  - The 7th Austro-Hungarian cavalry division.

The ratio of forces was as follows:

Force categories	2nd Romanian Army	Gerok Group	Ratio of forces
Infantry battalions	56	28	2/1
Cavalry squadrons	14	36	1/2.6
Artillery pieces	228	142	1.6/1
– of which, heavy artillery	52	6	8.7/1
Machine guns	448	252	1.8/1

In the summer of 1917, one of the largest concentrations of forces in the First World War was located in Romania: 9 armies, 80 infantry, and 19 cavalry divisions, totaling 974 battalions, 550 squadrons, and 923 artillery batteries. 800,000 combatants and 1,000,000 reservists were present.

== Situation at the front ==
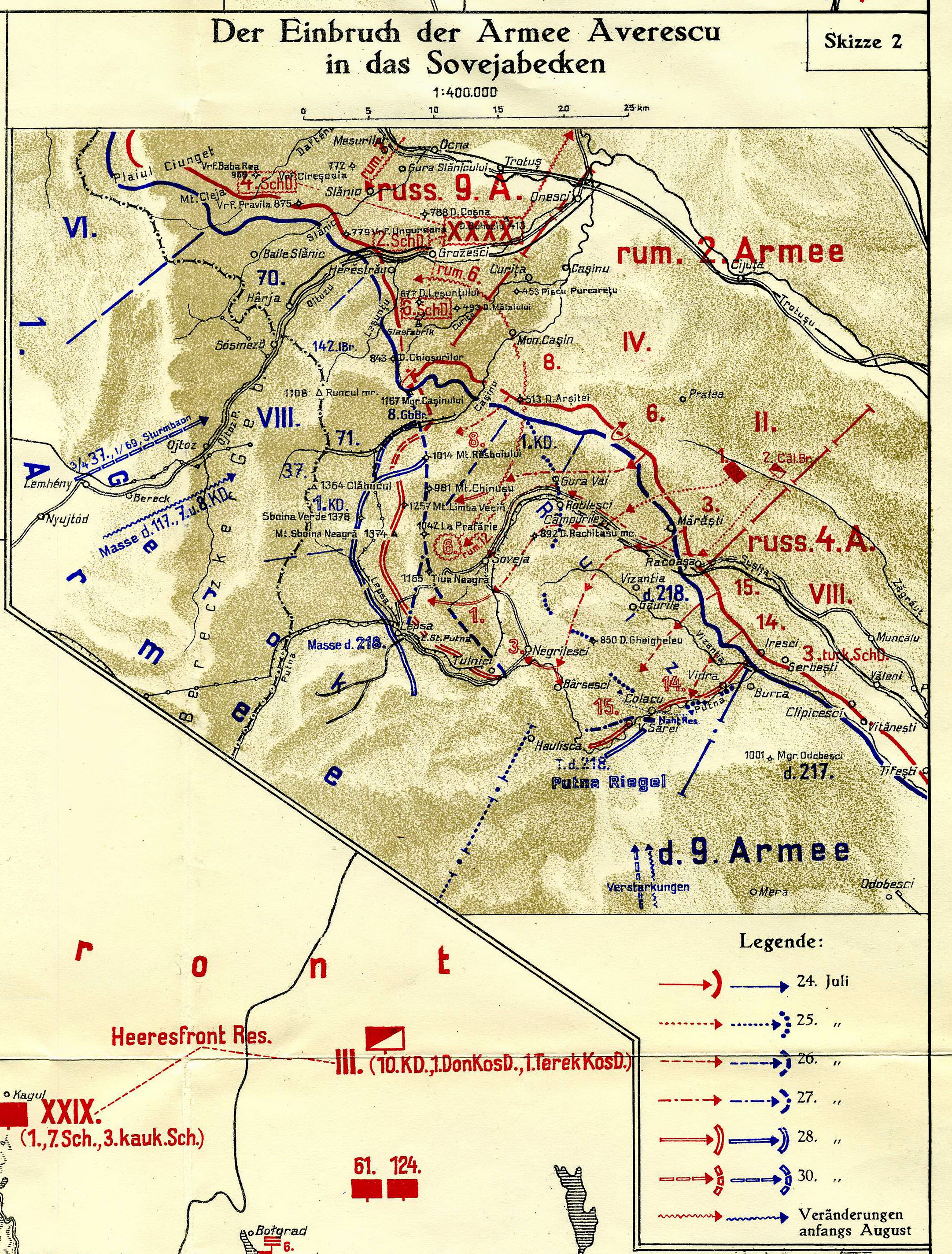
Mărăști battlefield in detail

When the operation began, the situation on the Mărăști-Nămoloasa front was as follows: the 2nd Romanian Army was positioned between Arșița Mocanului Hill and the commune of Răcoasa. The 9th Russian Army was on its right flank and the 4th Russian Army on its left flank. Each of the three divisions from the first-order vanguard of the 2nd Army covered some 12 km (7.5 mi) of the front. Facing the Romanians was the right flank of the First Austro-Hungarian Army; more specifically, these were elements of the Gerok Group. The main Austro-Hungarian forces were placed between Momâia Hill (630 m (2,070 ft)) and Arșița Mocanului Hill. Again, each division covered 12 km (7.5 mi) of the front.

== Preparations for battle ==
The Romanian order of battle provided for the principal offensive to unfold in three phases. The first phase envisioned breaking through the enemy defenses between Încărcătoarea clearing (711 m (2,333 ft)) and the village of Mărăști with the aim of taking Teiuș Hill. The 3rd Infantry Division and right-flank forces of the 6th Infantry Division were selected to break through, after which they were to hold the Încărcătoarea clearing–Câmpuri–Vizantea Mânăstirească–Găurile line. If needed, second-order troops could be sent in. In the second phase, the 4th Army Corps was to join the fight by starting a left-flank offensive towards the Coada Văii–Babei clearing. To the south, the advance was to take place in cooperation with the 4th Russian Army's right flank and with the aid of the 2nd Romanian Army, its objective being to reach the Coada Văii–Babei clearing–Rotilești–Teiuș Hill–Valea Teiușului line. The third planned phase envisioned the front shifting to the Sboina Neagră Peak hills to the north of Lepșa, north of the Putna River–Valea Sării line. The enemy commanders were informed about the Allied armies' operations, but thought they had the ability to repulse their offensive and even to launch a counterattack.

The German and Austro-Hungarian units' defensive works were of two kinds: the first consisted of resistance centres connected by a network of redoubts and trenches, protected by various obstacles and covered by artillery and machine-gun fire; at essential points, these resistance centres had steel domes, labyrinths of redoubts that facilitated communication and firing, artillery platforms, machine-gun alcoves, and shelters for personnel and munitions. The centres were connected by well-maintained, well-placed trenches that allowed the troops to keep fighting even when encircled. The second kind consisted of discontinuous sections of hastily built trenches situated 1,500 m (4,900 ft) and 2,000 m (6,600 ft) from the front line. The subterranean defensive lines were poorly developed; moreover, the first line of defense was spread out over uncovered terrain and lacked strong forward posts. This allowed Romanian Army ground patrols as well as the Air Corps to easily identify these positions. Another disadvantage of those lines of defense, which was successfully exploited by the Romanian Army, was the difficult terrain in front of the lines, which allowed numerous groups of Romanian troops to hide therein and carry out swift bayonet attacks or decisive assaults.

Before ground troops made their assault, the Romanian artillery had a decisive role in the success of the operation. Divisional artillery attacked, destroyed and disorganized the enemy's military engineers' works in the first line of defense and created breaches in the barbed wire fences. The army corps artillery had an anti-artillery mission, destroying enemy batteries. The preparatory work of the artillery took place between 22 July at 12 noon until the next day at 8 pm. The efficiency of this work was much appreciated by the Romanian officers, and was continually monitored by the front-rank troops. The 2nd Army Command thus decided, through Order Nr. 1908, to launch the ground assault on 24 July at 4 am.

== Aftermath ==
By 30 July, the 2nd Army had won a 35 km (22 mi) wide and about 20 km (12 mi) deep bridgehead into the 1st Austro-Hungarian Army’s front. The offensive was stopped because the Allied Command had to adjust its initial plans. The new plan moved the 9th Russian Army from the Western Moldavian front to the Northern front to stop the successful offensive of the 3rd and 7th Austro-Hungarian Armies from Bukovina, which started on 19 July. Moreover, the 1st and 2nd Romanian Armies, along with the 4th Russian Army, had to expand their area of responsibility to compensate for the withdrawal of the 9th Russian Army.

The Battle of Mărăști represented an important turning point in the evolution of the military operations on the Romanian Front and raised the morale of Romanian troops. Reorganised and thoroughly trained, having experienced the 1916 campaign, Romanian troops showed themselves to be an adversary capable of posing a problem for, and even defeating the German and Austro-Hungarian armies. The result of this battle was due not only to the tactical abilities of both the Romanian officers and of the Romanian artillerymen, and their collaboration with ground troops, as well as the determination and tenacity in battle of Romanian soldiers, but also to the aid given by locals, who provided intelligence about the enemy and guided Romanian troops along mountain paths toward the enemy flanks and even behind their lines.

The results of the offensive can be summarized as follows:

- The front line was broken on a 35 km (22 mi) stretch and penetrated to a depth of 20 km (12 mi), resulting in the liberation of a 500 km^{2} (190 sq mi) area comprising 30 villages;
- The Romanian-Russian forces took 2,700 prisoners, 70 guns, and important quantities of matériel, including a significant amount of munitions;
- 32 Class III Order of Michael the Brave medals were awarded to Romanian officers. The flags of four regiments (4th, 18th, 30th Infantry and 2nd Vânători) were decorated with the same distinction, while a Class II Order of Michael the Brave medal was bestowed upon General Averescu.

Archduke Joseph made a report identifying and presenting the principal causes for his defeat at Mărăști:

- "An admirable cooperation between artillery, infantry and aviation in breaking through our lines and preparing the assault; their planes flew undisturbed by the firing of our artillery." "The mine-throwers performed excellently in places where we passed through."
- "The exhaustion of our retreating troops on a difficult terrain."
- The Romanian Army "continuously changed its first-rank troops, who were led away by the inhabitants to their villages."

During the Battle of Mărăști, the highest average rate of offensive actions by Allied troops in the European theatre in 1917 was achieved, as shown by the following table.

Offensive action	Dates (NS)	Length (days)	Front (km)	Depth of penetration (km)	Average rate (km/day)
British Artois offensive	9 April – 5 May	27	24	5	0.2
Second Battle of the Aisne	16 April – 5 May	19	0	5	0.3
French offensive at Moronvilliers	17 April – 20 May	34	12	3	0.1
Allied offensive in Flanders	7–8 June	2	16	4	2.0
Romanian offensive at Mărăști	24 July – 1 August	9	35	28	3.0

The Romanian victory strongly affected the public opinion, as illustrated by reactions of the press: a few days after the battle was over, The Times wrote: "The only point of light in the East is to be found in Romania, where the rebuilt army is vigorously attacking the Carpathian lines, obtaining notable successes." The French Minister of War used the same tone to describe the Romanian victory: "The French Army has learned with joy of the beautiful successes of the Romanian Army (...) Please send my warmest congratulations and the most hearty good wishes of the French soldiers to their brothers in arms."

The success of this offensive caused Field Marshal von Mackensen to move a significant part of the 9th German Army from Nămoloasa towards Focșani. This caused the 9th German Army to alter its offensive direction, thus reducing pressure along the Nămoloasa front. Furthermore, a breach that could be further opened had been created in the German lines; a basis now existed from which the Allied armies could greatly expand their future offensive operations on the Romanian Front.

== The Mărăști Mausoleum ==
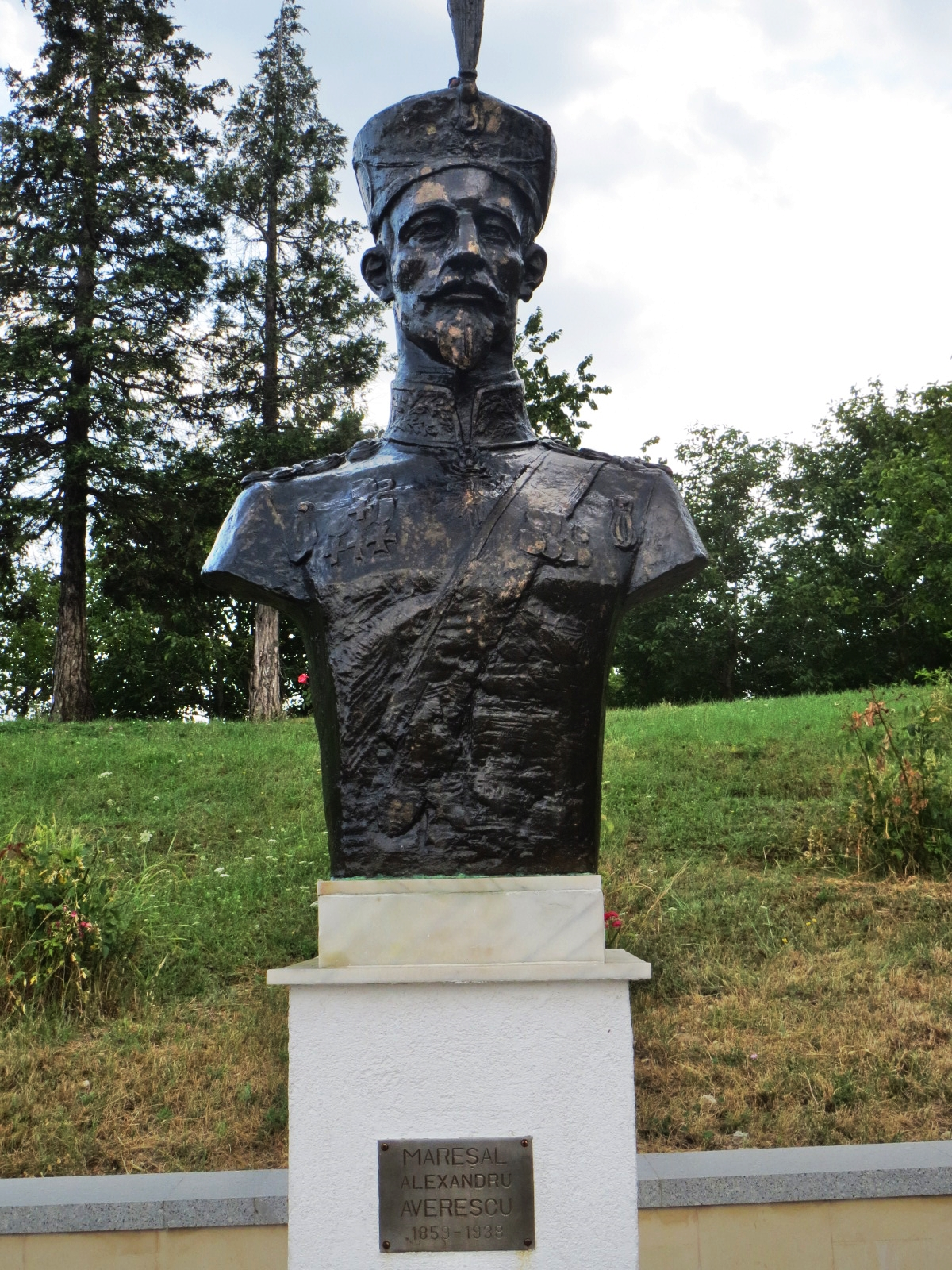
Bust of general Alexandru Averescu, commander of the 2nd Romanian Army, near the mausoleum

In order to honour the memory of the heroes of Mărăști and to keep alive a recollection of the fighting that occurred there, the cornerstone of the Mărăști Mausoleum was laid in a ceremony on 10 June 1928. The mausoleum was built at an altitude of 536 m (where some of the heaviest fighting took place) through the initiative of a group of officers and generals who were part of the Mărăști Society in the commune of Răcoasa, village of Mărăști. Above the entrance gate to the mausoleum grounds there is a sign that reads, "The historic battlefield of Mărăști". The architect Pandele Șerbănescu designed the mausoleum, with bas-reliefs executed by Aurel Bordenache. Spread out over a surface of 1,000 m^{2} (11,000 sq ft), the mausoleum is held up by two large rectangular concrete pillars on top of which two urns were placed, in each of them an eternal flame once burned. The pillars are amply decorated with bronze bas-reliefs that depict a Romanian peasant crossing the front with information about the enemy, and the reception given to a Romanian general by the inhabitants of Marăști. Between the two pillars, on a concrete wall, there are thirteen white marble slabs inscribed with the names of over 900 Romanian troops who fell in battle. In the basement there are soldiers' ossuaries as well as crypts for the officers who fell in battle. After their death, the coffins of Marshal Alexandru Averescu and those of Generals Artur Văitoianu, Alexandru Mărgineanu, and Nicolae Arghirescu were laid to rest there.

The Mausoleum, open Tuesday through Sunday from 9 am to 5 pm, can be reached by the Focșani–Soveja county highway.

== See also ==
- Romania during World War I
- Kerensky Offensive (1 July to 19 July 1917)
- Battle of Mărășești (6 August to 8 September 1917)

== Bibliography ==
- România în anii primului război mondial, vol. 2, Editura Militară, Bucharest, 1987
- Istoria Militară a Poporului Român, vol. 5, Editura Militară, Bucharest, 1988
- Cupșa, Ion. Mărăști, Mărășești, Oituz, Editura Militară, 1967
