= Aluna (river) =

- Location within Romania

Location
- Country: Romania
- Counties: Vrancea County

Physical characteristics
- Source: Făcăzaele Hill
- Mouth: Șușița
  - location: Varnița
  - coordinates: 45°57′42″N 26°58′0″E
  - elevation: 256 m (840 ft)
- Length: 9 km (5.6 mi)
- Basin size: 17 km^{2} (6.6 sq mi)

Basin features
- Progression: Șușița→ Siret→ Danube→ Black Sea

The Aluna is a left tributary of the river Șușița in Romania. It discharges into the Șușița in Varnița. Its length is 9 km (5.6 mi) and its basin size is 17 km^{2} (6.6 sq mi).
