= Șușița (Siret) =

- Location within Romania

Location
- Country: Romania
- Counties: Vrancea County
- Towns: Panciu

Physical characteristics
- Source: Mount Locoțeilor
  - location: Vrancea Mountains
  - coordinates: 45°54′44″N 27°37′23″E
  - elevation: 927 m (3,041 ft)
- Mouth: Siret
  - location: Doaga
  - coordinates: 45°50′3″N 27°18′17″E
  - elevation: 45 m (148 ft)
- Length: 70 km (43 mi)

Basin features
- Progression: Siret→ Danube→ Black Sea
- Tributaries
  - left: Cremeneț, Alba, Aluna

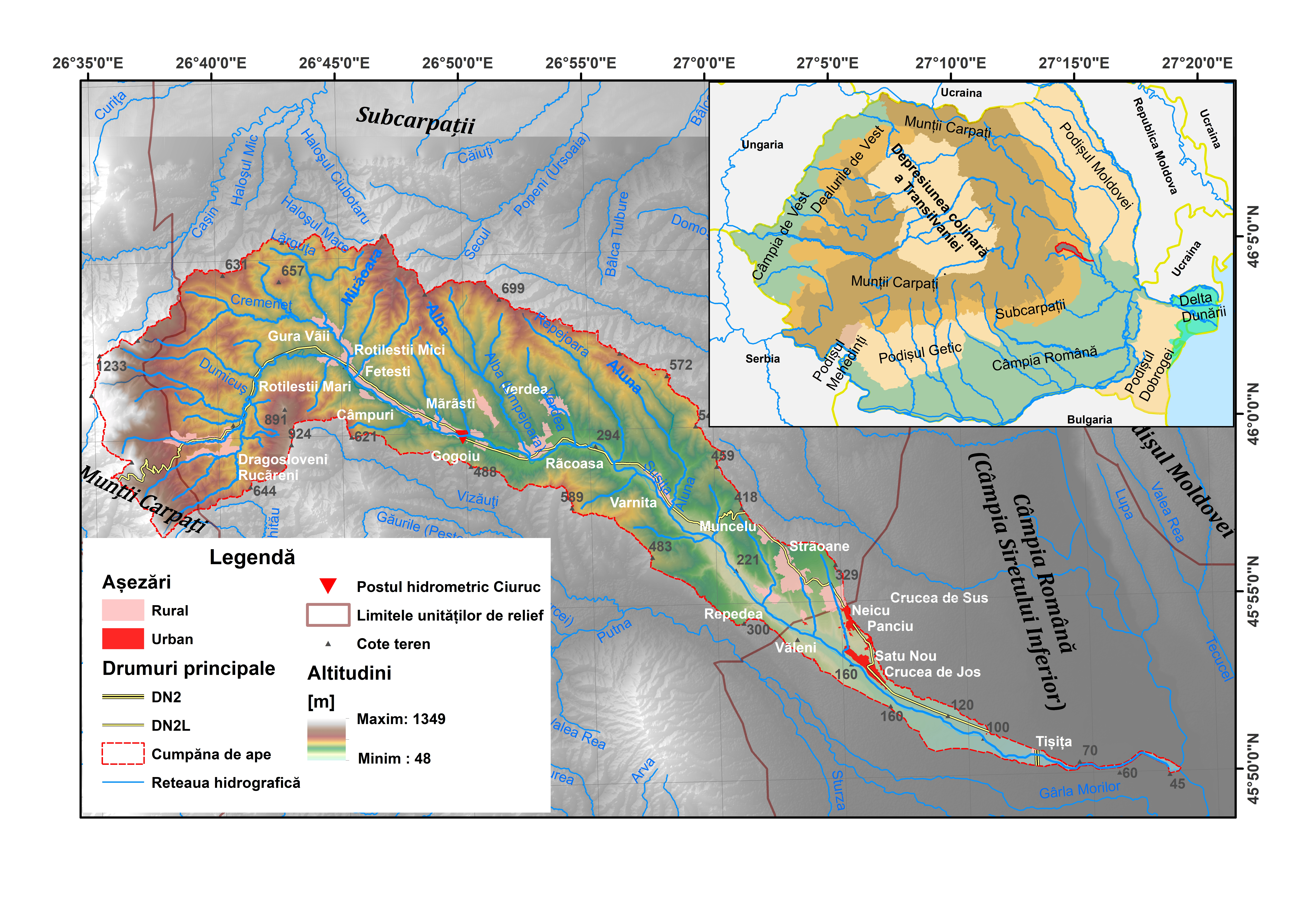
The Șușița river basin (map labels are in Romanian)

The Șușița is a right tributary of the river Siret in Romania. It discharges into the Siret in Doaga. It flows through the following towns and villages, from source to mouth: Rucăreni, Dragosloveni, Rotileștii Mari, Câmpuri, Gogoiu, Răcoasa, Varnița, Repedea, Panciu, Satu Nou, Tișița and Doaga. Its length is 75 km (47 mi) and its basin size is 385 km^{2} (149 sq mi).

== Tributaries ==
The following rivers are tributaries to the river Șușița (from source to mouth):

- Left: Dragomira, Soveja, Chiua, Dumicuș, Cremeneț, Alba, Verdea, Repejoara (or Pârâul Repede), Punga, Aluna, Ernatica, Gâsca (or Pârâul lui Gâscă), Pârâul lui Pricop, Repedea (or Valea Rea), Valea Îngustă, Volădanu, Hăulița
- Right: Păcura, Furtuneasca, Rotilași, Sărățelu, Pârâul Sărat, Pârâul Găii, Flâmânda, Podobitu, Giurgea, Pârâul lui Găman, Vizontea, Mireanu, Glăznescu, Ciubotaru, Chinu, Pârâul Văii, Varnița
