= XXIV Reserve Corps =

XXIV Reserve Corps XXIV. Reserve-Korps
- Flag of the Staff of a Generalkommando (1871–1918)
- Active: October 1914 - post November 1918
- Country: German Empire
- Type: Corps
- Size: Approximately 32,000 (on formation)
- Engagements: World War I

Insignia
- Abbreviation: XXIV RK

The XXIV Reserve Corps (German: XXIV. Reserve-Korps / XXIV RK) was a corps level command of the German Army in World War I.

== Formation ==
XXIV Reserve Corps was formed in October 1914. It was part of the first wave of new Corps formed at the outset of World War I consisting of XXII - XXVII Reserve Corps of 43rd - 54th Reserve Divisions (plus 6th Bavarian Reserve Division). The personnel was predominantly made up of kriegsfreiwillige (wartime volunteers) who did not wait to be called up. It was still in existence at the end of the war in the 1st Army, Heeresgruppe Deutscher Kronprinz on the Western Front.

=== Structure on formation ===
On formation in October 1914, XXIV Reserve Corps consisted of two divisions. but was weaker than an Active Corps

- Reserve Infantry Regiments consisted of three battalions but only had a machine gun platoon (of 2 machine guns) rather than a machine gun company (of 6 machine guns)
- Reserve Jäger Battalions did not have a machine gun company on formation, though some were provided with a machine gun platoon
- Reserve Cavalry Detachments were much smaller than the Reserve Cavalry Regiments formed on mobilisation
- Reserve Field Artillery Regiments consisted of three abteilungen (2 gun and 1 howitzer) of three batteries each, but each battery had just 4 guns (rather than 6 of the Active and the Reserve Regiments formed on mobilisation)

In summary, XXIV Reserve Corps mobilised with 26 infantry battalions, 8 machine gun platoons (16 machine guns), 2 cavalry detachments, 18 field artillery batteries (72 guns) and 2 pioneer companies.

Corps	Division	Brigade	Units
XXIV Reserve Corps	47th Reserve Division	93rd Reserve Infantry Brigade	217th Reserve Infantry Regiment
XXIV Reserve Corps	47th Reserve Division	93rd Reserve Infantry Brigade	218th Reserve Infantry Regiment
XXIV Reserve Corps	47th Reserve Division	94th Reserve Infantry Brigade	219th Reserve Infantry Regiment
XXIV Reserve Corps	47th Reserve Division	94th Reserve Infantry Brigade	220th Reserve Infantry Regiment
XXIV Reserve Corps	47th Reserve Division		19th Reserve Jäger Battalion
XXIV Reserve Corps	47th Reserve Division		47th Reserve Field Artillery Regiment
XXIV Reserve Corps	47th Reserve Division		47th Reserve Cavalry Detachment
XXIV Reserve Corps	47th Reserve Division		47th Reserve Pioneer Company
XXIV Reserve Corps	48th Reserve Division	95th Reserve Infantry Brigade	221st Reserve Infantry Regiment
XXIV Reserve Corps	48th Reserve Division	95th Reserve Infantry Brigade	222nd Reserve Infantry Regiment
XXIV Reserve Corps	48th Reserve Division	96th Reserve Infantry Brigade	223rd Reserve Infantry Regiment
XXIV Reserve Corps	48th Reserve Division	96th Reserve Infantry Brigade	224th Reserve Infantry Regiment
XXIV Reserve Corps	48th Reserve Division		20th Reserve Jäger Battalion
XXIV Reserve Corps	48th Reserve Division		48th Reserve Field Artillery Regiment
XXIV Reserve Corps	48th Reserve Division		48th Reserve Cavalry Detachment
XXIV Reserve Corps	48th Reserve Division		48th Reserve Pioneer Company

== Commanders ==
XXIV Reserve Corps had the following commanders during its existence:

From	Rank	Name
25 August 1914	General der Infanterie	Eberhard von Claer
19 September 1914	General der Infanterie	Friedrich von Gerok
19 February 1918	Generalleutnant	Felix Langer

== See also ==
- German Army order of battle, Western Front (1918)

== Bibliography ==
- Cron, Hermann (2002). Imperial German Army 1914-18: Organisation, Structure, Orders-of-Battle [first published: 1937]. Helion & Co. ISBN 1-874622-70-1.
- Ellis, John; Cox, Michael (1993). The World War I Databook. Aurum Press Ltd. ISBN 1-85410-766-6.
- Busche, Hartwig (1998). Formationsgeschichte der Deutschen Infanterie im Ersten Weltkrieg (1914 bis 1918) (in German). Institut für Preußische Historiographie.
- Histories of Two Hundred and Fifty-One Divisions of the German Army which Participated in the War (1914-1918), compiled from records of Intelligence section of the General Staff, American Expeditionary Forces, at General Headquarters, Chaumont, France 1919. The London Stamp Exchange Ltd. 1989 [1920]. ISBN 0-948130-87-3.
- The German Forces in the Field; 7th Revision, 11th November 1918; Compiled by the General Staff, War Office. Imperial War Museum, London and the Battery Press. 1995 [1918]. ISBN 978-1-870423-95-3.
