= Stelian Isac =

Romanian footballer

Personal information
- Date of birth: 19 September 1981 (age 45)
- Place of birth: Panciu, Romania
- Height: 1.76 m (5 ft 9 in)
- Position: Centre back

Youth career
- 1993–1997: LPS Focșani
- 1997–2002: Unirea Focșani

Senior career*
Years	Team	Apps	(Gls)
2002–2007	FCM Bacău	71	(0)
2007–2008	CSM Focșani	9	(0)
2008–2011	Victoria Brănești	83	(2)
2012	Gloria Bistrița	11	(0)
2012	Voluntari	14	(0)
2013	CS Corbeanca	25	(2)
2013–2014	Tunari	44	(1)
2015	CS Panciu	?	(?)
2015	Voința Crevedia	?	(?)
Total		257	(5)

Managerial career
- 2015: Voinţa Crevedia
- 2016–2017: Juventus București U19
- 2017–2020: Chindia Târgoviște (fitness coach)
- 2020–2021: Petrolul Ploiești (fitness coach)
- 2021: Hermannstadt (fitness coach)
- 2021–2022: Chindia Târgoviște (fitness coach)
- 2022–2023: Botoșani (fitness coach)
- 2025: Politehnica Iași (fitness coach)
- 2025: Hermannstadt (fitness coach)
- * Club domestic league appearances and goals

Stelian Isac (born 19 September 1981) is a former Romanian professional footballer who played as a defender.

== Honours ==
Victoria Brănești

- Liga II: 2009–10
- Liga III: 2008–09
