= Mărășești (disambiguation) =

Mărășești is a town in Vrancea County, Romania.

Mărăşeşti may also refer to:

- NMS Mărășești, a World War II Romanian destroyer
- Romanian frigate Mărășești, a Romanian Navy frigate
- Mărăşeşti, a village administered by Baia de Aramă town, Mehedinţi County, Romania
- Mărăşeşti, a village in Band Commune, Mureș County, Romania
- Mărăşeşti, a village in Voineşti Commune, Vaslui County, Romania
- Mărăşeşti, a village in Cubolta Commune, Sîngerei district, Moldova

== See also ==
- Mărăști (disambiguation)
