= Dumitru Stratilescu =

Romanian military officer

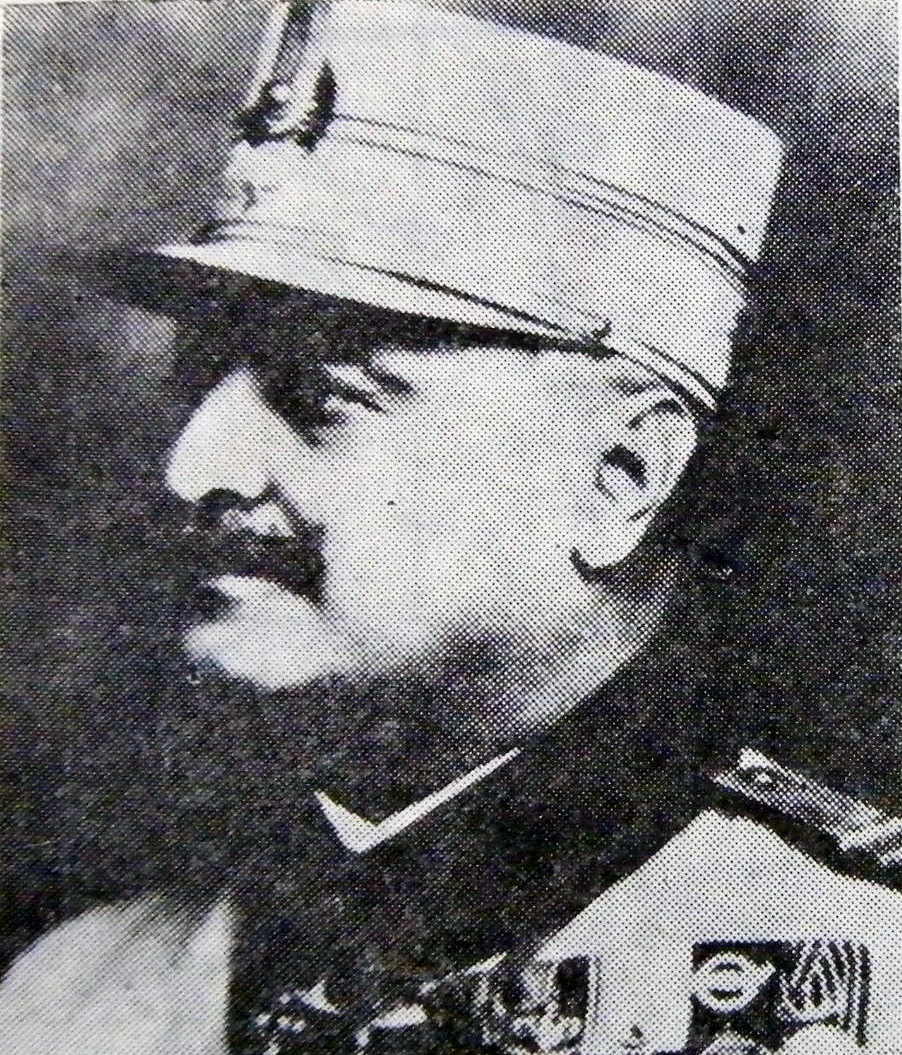
- Born: 28 August 1864
- Died: 1927 (aged 63); Bucharest, Romania
- Education: Higher War School
- Military career
- Allegiance: Kingdom of Romania
- Branch: Romanian Land Forces
- Service years: 1884 — 1927
- Rank: Brigadier General
- Commands: First Army
- Conflicts: Second Balkan War; World War I; Battle of Bucharest; Pitești–Târgoviște Retreat; Battle of Mărăști
- Awards: Order of the Star of Romania, officer Order of the Crown of Romania, commander Order of Michael the Brave, III Class

Dumitru Stratilescu, sometimes spelled as Dumitru Strătilescu, (28 August 1864 – 1927) was a Romanian general and military commander. During World War I, he commanded the First, Third, Fourth, and Fifth corps of the First Army of Romania.

== Military career ==
Dumitru Stratilescu was born on 28 August 1864. He began his military education in 1884 by attending the Military School for Infantry and Cavalry in Bucharest, which he graduated from in 1886. He reached the rank of lieutenant in 1890, was promoted to the rank of captain in 1895, and was promoted to the rank of major in 1905. He also attended the Higher War School in Bucharest. In 1908, he was promoted to the rank of lieutenant colonel, while he reached the rank of colonel in 1911. Stratilescu then participated in the Second Balkan War.

== World War I ==
At the time of Romania's entry into the war on the side of the Entente powers, Stratilescu was acting Deputy Chief of the General Staff. From 1 November 1916, he served as commander of the First Corps, replacing Nicolae Petalu. He was in office for less than fifteen days, however, as he was appointed commander of the First Army on 12 November. Commanding the First Army, he took part in the Battle of Bucharest. He also commanded the First Army for a very short time because it was disbanded by a reorganization carried out in December 1916. In 1916, he was promoted to the rank of brigadier general. He then took command of the First Infantry Division, which was part of the Second Corps (led by General Artur Văitoianu) of the Second Army (led by General Alexandru Averescu).Stratilescu commanded the First Division during the Battle of Mărăști, in July 1917. He was decorated with the Order of Michael the Brave, Third Class, for the way he led the First Infantry Division in Mărăști.

" For the dexterity with which he conducted the operations of the division, in July 1917."
High Decree no. 759 of July 21, 1917

In December 1917 he became commander of the Fourth Corps, which he commanded until February 1918, when he was appointed commander of the Fifth Corps. After that, from May 1918 until the end of the war, he commanded Third Corps. During 1918, he reached the rank of divisional general.

=== Postwar life ===
After the end of the war, he served as commander of the 1st inspection area. He then served as Chief Inspector of the Army. He died in 1927 in Bucharest.

== Awards ==
- Order of the Star of Romania, officer (1912)
- Order of the Crown of Romania, commander (1909)
- Medal for Manhood and Faith, with the distinction "Campaign of 1913" (1913)
- Order of Michael the Brave, III Class (July 21, 1917)
