= 47th Reserve Division =

47th Reserve Division (47. Reserve-Division)
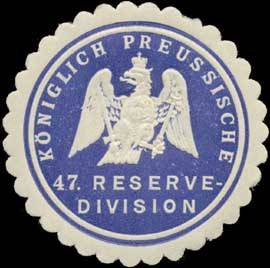
- Seal mark of the division
- Active: September 1914 – 2 August 1918
- Country: German Empire
- Branch: Imperial German Army
- Type: Infantry
- Size: Approx. 15,000
- Engagements: World War I: Battle of Limanowa; Gorlice-Tarnów Offensive; German spring offensive; Second Battle of the Marne

The 47th Reserve Division (47. Reserve-Division) was a unit of the Imperial German Army in World War I. The division was formed in September 1914 and organized over the next month, arriving in the line in October. It was part of the first wave of new divisions formed at the outset of World War I, which were numbered the 43rd through 54th Reserve Divisions. The division was part of XXIV Reserve Corps. It was disbanded on August 2, 1918.

== Recruitment ==
The 217th Reserve Infantry Regiment was raised in the Prussian Province of Saxony and the Duchy of Anhalt. The 218th, 219th, and 220th Reserve Infantry Regiments were raised in the Prussian Province of Westphalia, but included troops from other Prussian provinces and German states. After the 217th Reserve Infantry Regiment was transferred to the 225th Infantry Division, the 47th Reserve Division was nominally all-Westphalian, but by that point in the war levies of new replacements often came from all over the German Empire.

== Combat chronicle ==
The 47th Reserve Division initially fought on the Western Front, entering the line in October between the Meuse and Moselle and remaining there until late November, when it was transported to the Eastern Front. It fought in the Limanowa-Lapanow in December 1914 suffering heavy casualties and Gorlice-Tarnów Offensive in 1915. In May 1917, it returned to the Western Front, and occupied the line near Verdun. In 1918, the division fought in the German spring offensive, breaking through at St.Quentin–La Fère and fighting on to the Montdidier-Noyon region. It later saw action in the Second Battle of the Marne. The division was in Lorraine when it was disbanded on August 2, 1918. In 1917, Allied intelligence rated the division as a mediocre division. In 1918 it was rated second class, and it was noted that its strength had been allowed to diminish without replenishment, leading to its dissolution.

== Order of battle on formation ==
The 47th Reserve Division was initially organized as a square division, with essentially the same organization as the reserve divisions formed on mobilization. The order of battle of the 47th Reserve Division on September 10, 1914, was as follows:

- 93. Reserve-Infanterie-Brigade
  - Reserve-Infanterie-Regiment Nr. 217
  - Reserve-Infanterie-Regiment Nr. 218
- 94. Reserve-Infanterie-Brigade
  - Reserve-Infanterie-Regiment Nr. 219
  - Reserve-Infanterie-Regiment Nr. 220
- Reserve-Kavallerie-Abteilung Nr. 47
- Reserve-Feldartillerie-Regiment Nr. 47
- Reserve-Pionier-Kompanie Nr. 47

== Order of battle on February 9, 1918 ==
The 47th Reserve Division was triangularized in May 1917. Over the course of the war, other changes took place, including the formation of artillery and signals commands and a pioneer battalion. The order of battle on February 9, 1918, was as follows:

- 94. Reserve-Infanterie-Brigade
  - Reserve-Infanterie-Regiment Nr. 218
  - Reserve-Infanterie-Regiment Nr. 219
  - Reserve-Infanterie-Regiment Nr. 220
  - MG-Scharfschützen-Abteilung Nr. 47
- 4.Eskadron/Jäger-Regiment zu Pferde Nr. 4
- Artillerie-Kommandeur 47
  - Reserve-Feldartillerie-Regiment Nr. 47
  - Fußartillerie-Bataillon Nr. 158 (from April 15, 1918)
- Pionier-Bataillon Nr. 347
- Divisions-Nachrichten-Kommandeur 447
