= Garoafa =

- Commune
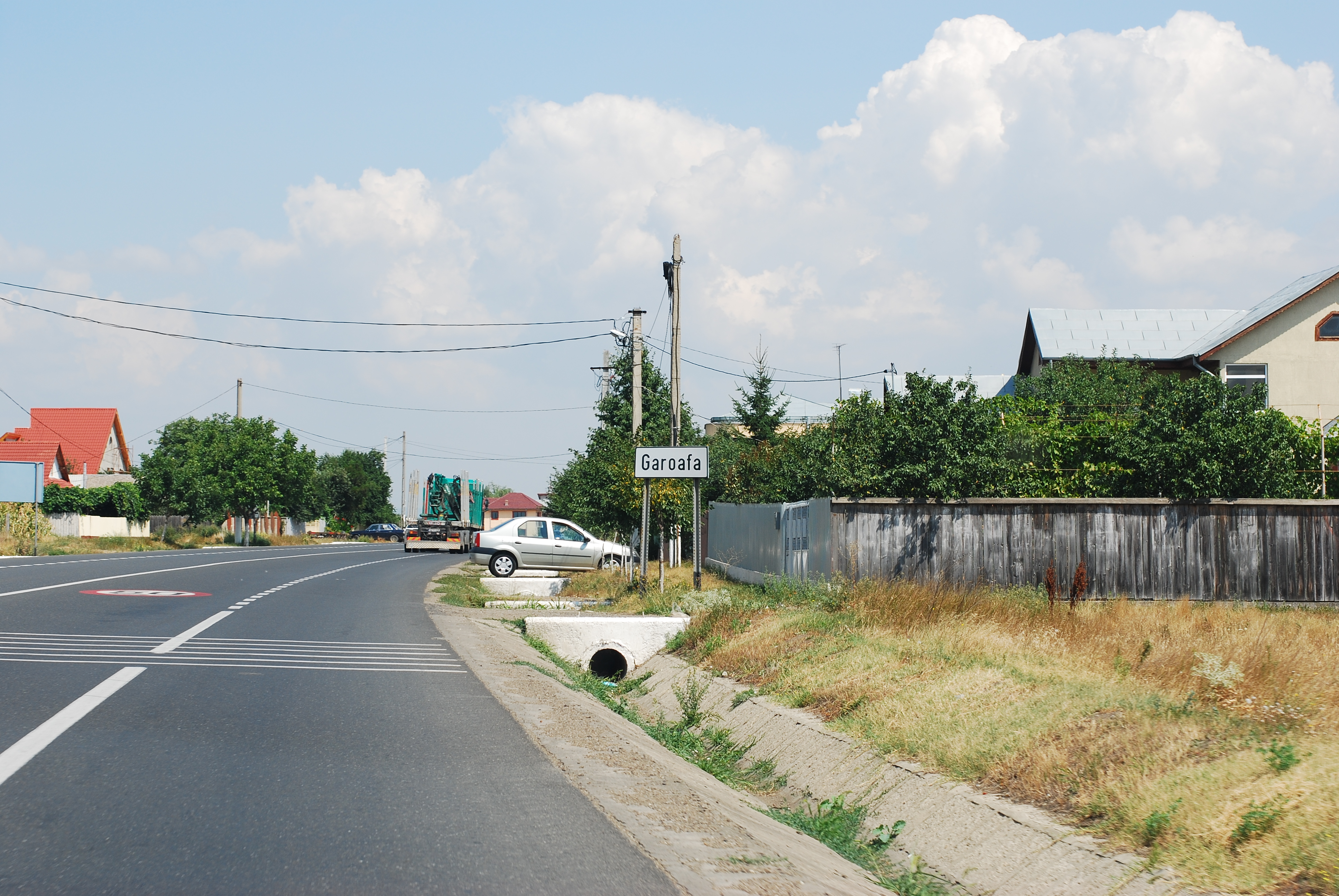
- DN2 entering Garoafa from the south

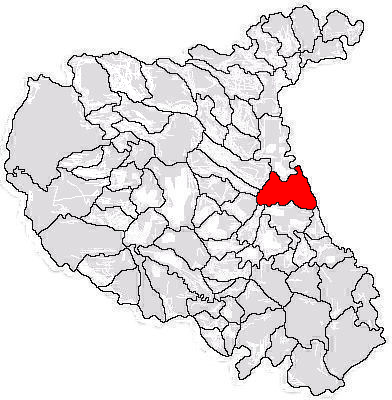
- Location in Vrancea County

- Location in Romania
- Coordinates: 45°47′N 27°12′E
- Country: Romania
- County: Vrancea

Government
  - Mayor (2024–2028): Laurențiu Diaconu (PNL)
- Area: 71.44 km^{2} (27.58 sq mi)
- Elevation: 66 m (217 ft)
- Population (2021-12-01): 4,432
  - Density: 62.04/km^{2} (160.7/sq mi)
- Time zone: UTC+02:00 (EET)
  - Summer (DST): UTC+03:00 (EEST)
- Postal code: 627140
- Area code: +(40) 237
- Vehicle reg.: VN
- Website: www.garoafa.primarievn.ro

Garoafa is a commune located in Vrancea County, Western Moldavia, Romania. It is composed of eight villages: Bizighești, Ciușlea, Doaga, Făurei, Garoafa, Precistanu, Răchitosu, and Străjescu.

The commune is located in the eastern part of the county, on the border with Galați County. It lies on the right bank of the Siret River, in the area where the Putna and Șușița rivers flow into it.

Garoafa is crossed by the DN2 national road, which connects it to Focșani, 11 km (6.8 mi) to the south, and to Bacău, 95 km (59 mi) to the north. The Putna Seacă train station serves the CFR Main Line 500, which connects Bucharest to Suceava and the Ukrainian border.

Historical population
Year	Pop.	±%
2002	4,618	—
2011	4,037	−12.6%
2021	4,432	+9.8%
Source: Census data
