= Aurel Iancu =

Aurel Gh. Iancu (born December 17, 1928, in Răcoasa, Vrancea County) is a Romanian economist, Ph.D. in economics in 1972, visiting scholar at MIT in 1970/71, researcher and associate professor, member of the Romanian Academy (since 1993), the most respected and influential scientific forum in Romania.

== Academic contributions ==
- Aurel Iancu has published a large number of books and articles. He is one of the promoters of using mathematics in economics in Romania, and one of the few Romanian researchers who approached economic growth and its effect on natural resources and environment. Since 1990 he was involved in new research topics such as theory of economic policy, economic transition, integration, real, nominal and institutional convergence.
- Since the price system was drastically distorted in the centralised economies and the energy saving was an important economic policy all over the world, the ideas to define, compute and interpret the direct, total (cumulated) and net energy consumption per product and branch, and to include them in the analysis of the branch structure of the national economy and in some economic decision were absolute novelties in economic research and literature of that period (1970–1980) marked by energy crisis (4-6).
- While neoclassical economists involved in modelling economic growth were assuming a diminishing return on investment along with a rising development level, he demonstrated (in 1976), by statistical data, that the return on investment did not permanently diminish along with economic development. In the most developed countries, the return on investment tends to grow because of the effects of intangible factors (3). Once the assumption that the return diminishes is invalidated, also the old formulation of the thesis that national and regional economies generally tend to converge is invalidated, excepting the former European socialist countries and regions due to the cohesion politics of the EU along the integration process (8-11).
- As a director for research of the Industrial Institute for Economics and as a vice-president executive of the Economic Department of the Romanian Academy, Aurel Iancu initiated and co-ordinated research programmes and projects such as: impact of the economic growth on the natural resources and environment evolution, economic integration, economic convergence.

== Major publications ==
1. Maximum Economic Efficiency, Modelling Methods, 1972, Editura Politică, 430 p.
2. Economic Growth Models, 1974, Editura Academiei Române, 292 p.
3. Economic Growth and Natural Resources, Editura Politică, 1976, 260 p.
4. Energy Consumption and Production Structure, co-author and editor, 1979, Editura Academiei Române.
5. Resources and the Structure of Industry (co-author and editor), 1980, Editura Academiei Române, 250 p.
6. On the Development of the Energy System and Energy Conservation (with reference to Romania's Economy), 16th International Seminar, The Problems of Energy: East and West, Milan, September 25–27, 1980, in Revue Roumaine des Sciences Sociales vol. 25, nr. 1–2, 1981.
7. Treatise of Economics: vol. 1, Economic Science and Its Interferences, Editura Economică, 1993, 300 p.; vol. 5, Fundamentals of the Economic Policy Theory, ALL&BECK, 1998, 650 p.
8. Liberalisation, Integration and the Industrial System, 2002, Expert Editura, 200 p.
9. Economic Convergence. Applications, 2007, Romanian Journal of Economic Forecasting, No. 4, 18 p.
10. Real Convergence and Integration, Romanian Journal of Economic Forecasting, 2008, No. 1, 20 p.
11. Economic Convergence, vol. 1, 2008, and vol. 2, 2009, (co-author and editor), Editura Academiei Române and CH Beck, 255 p. and 300 p.
12. Nicholas Georgescu-Roegen Founder of Economic School, 2009, Romanian Academy, CIDE.
