= Cremeneț =

- Location within Romania

Location
- Country: Romania
- Counties: Vrancea County
- Villages: Gura Văii, Fetești

Physical characteristics
- Source: Mount Seci
  - location: Vrancea Mountains
  - coordinates: 46°2′53″N 26°37′48″E
  - elevation: 685 m (2,247 ft)
- Mouth: Șușița
  - location: Rotileștii Mici
  - coordinates: 46°1′50″N 26°45′14″E
  - elevation: 382 m (1,253 ft)
- Length: 15 km (9.3 mi)
- Basin size: 55 km^{2} (21 sq mi)

Basin features
- Progression: Șușița→ Siret→ Danube→ Black Sea
- Tributaries
  - left: Dălmaciu, Lărguța, Mirioara

The Cremeneț is a left tributary of the river Șușița in Romania. It discharges into the Șușița in Rotileștii Mici. Its length is 15 km (9.3 mi) and its basin size is 55 km^{2} (21 sq mi).
