= Ion Roată =

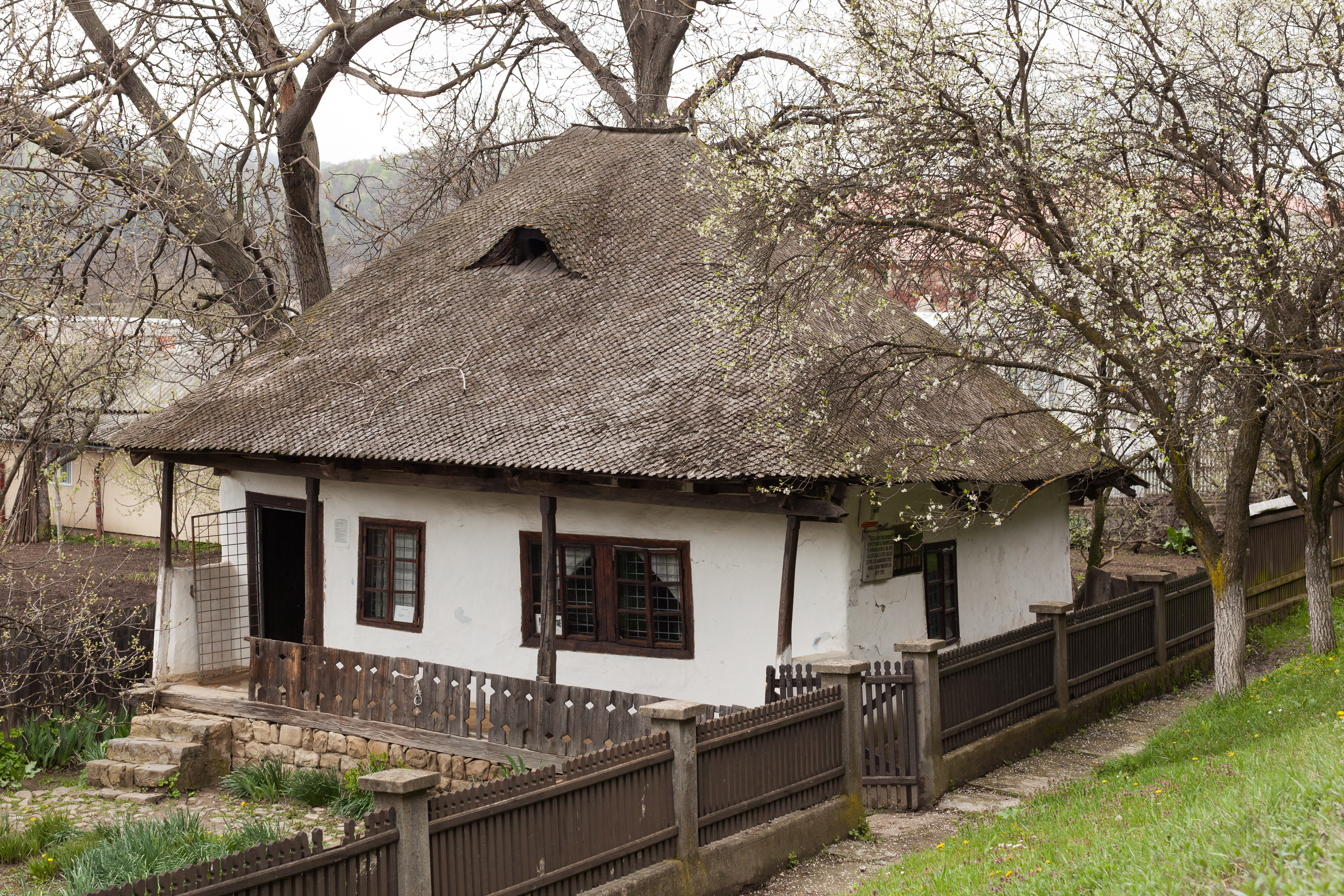
Moș Ion Roată memorial house in Câmpuri

Ion Roată (Romanian pronunciation: [iˈon ˈro̯atə]; also known as Ioan Roată or Moș Ion Roată; 1806 in Câmpuri, Vrancea County – 20 February 1882 in Gura Văii) was a Moldavian, later Romanian peasant and political figure. Roată was representative in the Moldavian ad hoc Divan for the peasant electoral college of Putna County. With Partida Naţională, he supported the election of Alexandru Ioan Cuza as Prince of Moldavia, as well as endorsing his elections in Wallachia (leading to the union of the two Danubian Principalities, which eventually occurred on 24 January 1859). At the same time, he campaigned in favor of land reform in Moldavia and Romania at large.

Roată was known for his personal friendship with Domnitor Cuza and his main supporter, Mihail Kogălniceanu; events involving the three of them are present in a series of anecdotes by Ion Creangă.
