= Battle of Limanowa =

1914 battle of World War I

- Part of the Eastern Front during World War I
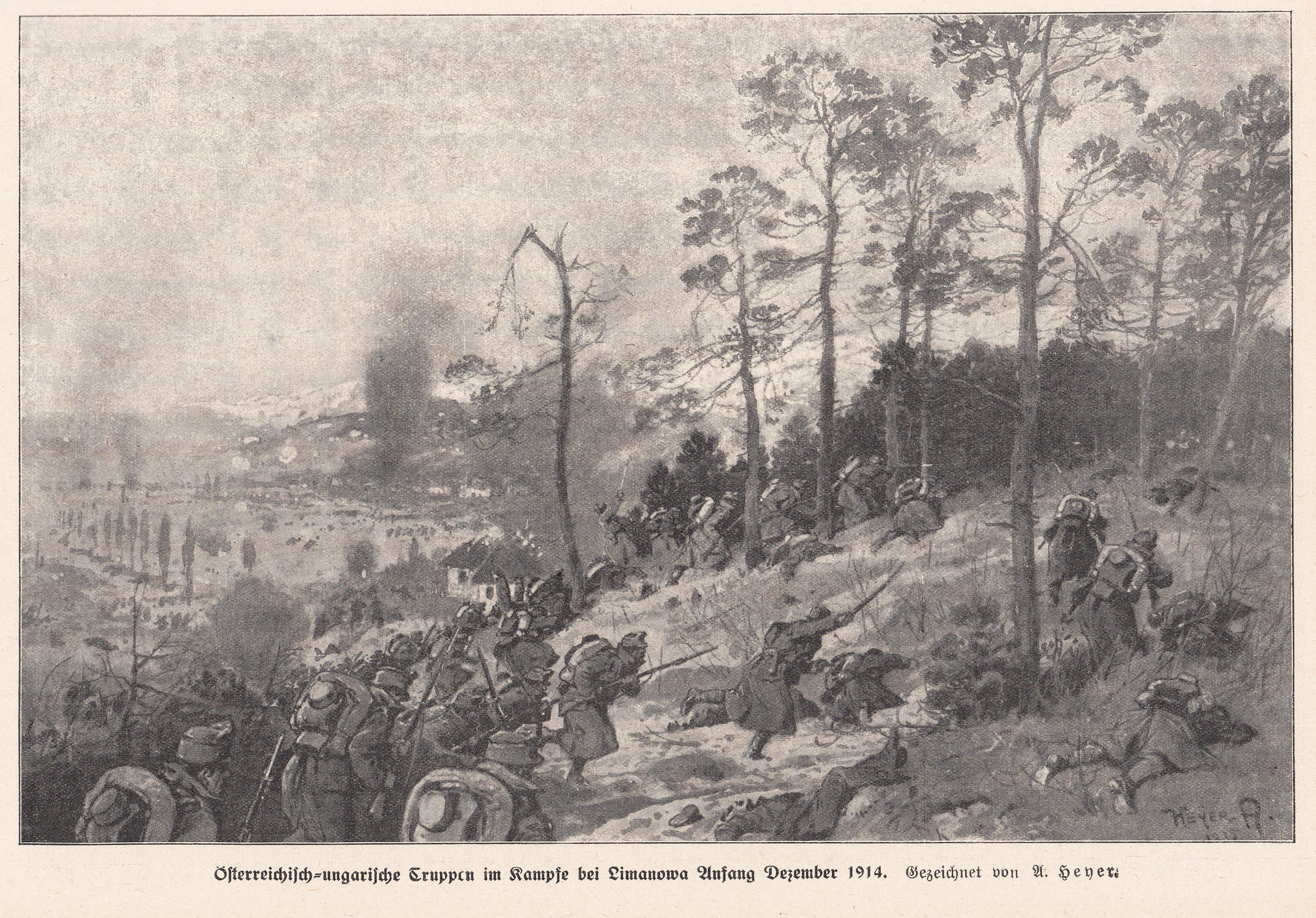
- Austro-Hungarian troops advance in Limonova, December 1914 (illustration by A. Heyer)
Date	1–13 December 1914
Location	Galicia, Carpathian Mountains
Result	Central Powers victory

Belligerents
Austria-Hungary; Germany	Russian Empire

Commanders and leaders
(Austria-Hungary) Conrad von Hötzendorf (Austria-Hungary) Josef Freiherr Roth (Austria-Hungary) AD. Joseph Ferdinand (Austria-Hungary) Svetozar Boroevic (Austria-Hungary) Sándor Szurmay (German Empire) Friedrich von Gerok	Nikolai Ivanov; Radko Dimitriev; Aleksei Brusilov

Units involved
(Austria-Hungary) 3rd Army (Austria-Hungary) 4th Army (German Empire) 47th Reserve Division	3rd Army; 8th Army

Strength
272,000; 750 machine guns 1,800 guns	282,736; 773 machine guns 1,493 guns

Casualties and losses
106,472	110,000 to 144,648

The Battle of Limanowa-Łapanów took place from 1 December to 13 December 1914, between the Austro-Hungarian Army and the Russian Army near the town of Limanowa (40 kilometres (25 mi) south-east of Kraków).

The Austro-Hungarian high command had assumed that the German success would weaken Russian forces in the north and that the Galician front would remain quiet. Both these assumptions were incorrect.

Though the Austro-Hungarian 2nd Army offensive opened on 16 November and met early success, the Russians proved stronger than expected and their 4th Army yielded little ground. Meanwhile, further south the Russian 2nd Army advanced across the San river and moved into the Tarnów area by 20 November. Further north, the Austro-Hungarian 4th Army, supported by the German 47th Reserve Division, moved onto the offensive in the last days of November.

In fierce battles around the towns of Łapanów and Limanowa, the Russian 3rd Army was beaten and forced to retreat east, ending its opportunity to reach Kraków. To avoid being surrounded, the Russian 8th Army also had to retreat, stopping its advance toward the Hungarian plains.

The confrontation was one of the final battles won unilaterally by the Austro-Hungarian Army. Most of its later victories during the war were dependent on German assistance, and it ceased to exist with the disestablishment of Austria-Hungary at the end of the war.

The Austro-Hungarians also did not achieve their final objectives of deblocking Przemysl, the Russians stubbornly defended the approaches to the fortress, which only resulted in increased losses on both sides.

== Background ==
As Dimitriev's Russian 3rd Army advance towards Krakow stalled, Conrad prepared to turn its southern flank. Accordingly, Roth's Austro-Hungarian 4th Army's XIV Corps, combined with the 47th Reserve Infantry Division, was ordered to assemble at Chabówka. Simultaneously, Boroević's Austro-Hungarian 3rd Army was to take Bartfeld and Neu Sandez. By 3 December, Roth was ready to advance towards Limanowa.

== Battle ==
After Roth reached Limanowa on 3 December, he sent his three divisions, the 13th Rifle Division, the 3rd Infantry Division, and the 8th Infantry Division, north towards Neu-Sandez. In response, the Russians sent their 9th and 11th Army Corps reserves to bolster their threatened southern flank. In addition, Brusilov's Russian 8th and 24th Army Corps were sent to Neu-Sandez. By 5 December, the Austro-Hungarian advance had halted, and the Russian 10th and 21st Army Corps were moving from north of the Vistula to Dimitriev's southern flank. In response, Conrad sent the Krakow garrison's Austro-Hungarian 45th Rifle Division east of Limanowa, supported by the 39th Honvéd Infantry Division, and command elements of the VI Corps. Dimitriev then ordered his two corps facing Krakow, the Russian 9th and 11th Army Corps, to begin a retreat to the east, in an effort to reduce the risk to his southern flank.

On 7 December, the Russian 8th Army Corps attacked from Neu-Sandez, but Roth's Austro-Hungarians halted their advance in defensive positions prepared earlier. One of the units facing the Russian 8th Army Corps was Józef Piłsudski's 1st Brigade, Polish Legions. Fighting continued through 10 December, with little movement along a line from Limanowa in the south to Łapanów in the north. By 10 December, the lead elements of Boroević's Austro-Hungarian army, led by Szurmay's 38th Honvéd Infantry Division, had reached Nawojowa, 4 miles (6.4 km) south of Neu-Sandez. With the arrival of the Austro-Hungarian IX Corps from Bartfeld, the Russian 24th Army Corps could no longer support the 8th Army Corps, and the Russian position in Neu-Sandez became untenable. Ivanov then ordered the Russian 8th Army Corps to retreat towards Zakliczyn, enabling Szurmay's Austro-Hungarians to capture Neu-Sandez on 12 December.

== Aftermath ==
The Russian threat to Krakow was eliminated and the Russians were pushed back across the Carpathians. The Austrian-Hungary forces claimed the battle as a victory.

Roth was awarded the Knight's Cross to the Military Order of Maria Theresa and given the honorific 'von Limanowa-Łapanów'.

== Order of battle ==
=== Russian forces ===
Russian Southwestern Front, Commander-in-chief – Nikolai Ivanov

- 3rd Army. Commander Radko Dimitriev
  - 11th Army Corps General Vladimir Sacharow (11th, 32nd Divisions)
  - 9th Army Corps General Dmitry Shcherbachev (5th, 42nd Divisions)
  - 10th Army Corps General Zerpitzki (9th, 31st Divisions)
  - 21st Army Corps General Shkinski (33rd, 44th Divisions)
- 8th Army. Commander Alexei Brusilov
  - 8th Army Corps General Dragomirow (14th, 15th Divisions)
  - 24th Army Corps General Zurikow (48th, 49th Divisions)
  - 7th Army Corps General Eck (13th, 34th Divisions)

=== Austro-Hungarian Forces ===
Commander-in-chief – Conrad von Hötzendorf

- 4th Army. Commander – Archduke Joseph Ferdinand
  - XI Corps FML Ljubicic (11th, 15th, 30th Divisions)
  - XIV Corps FML. Joseph Roth (3rd, 8th and 13th Divisions)
  - German 47th Reserve Division (General Alfred Besser)
  - VI Corps FML Arz von Straußenburg (39th, 45th Divisions)
  - Cavalry-Corps Herberstein (6th, 10th, 11th Cavalry Divisions)
- 3rd Army. Commander – General of Infantry Svetozar Boroevic
  - 38th Honvéd Division General Sándor Szurmay
  - IX Corps General Rudolf Kralicek (10th, 26th Divisions)
  - III Corps General Emil Colerus von Geldern (6th, 22nd, 28th Divisions)
  - VII Corps Archduke Joseph of Austria (17th, 20th Divisions)
