= Pitești–Târgoviște Retreat =

Romanian WWI operation

- Part of the Romanian Debacle of World War I
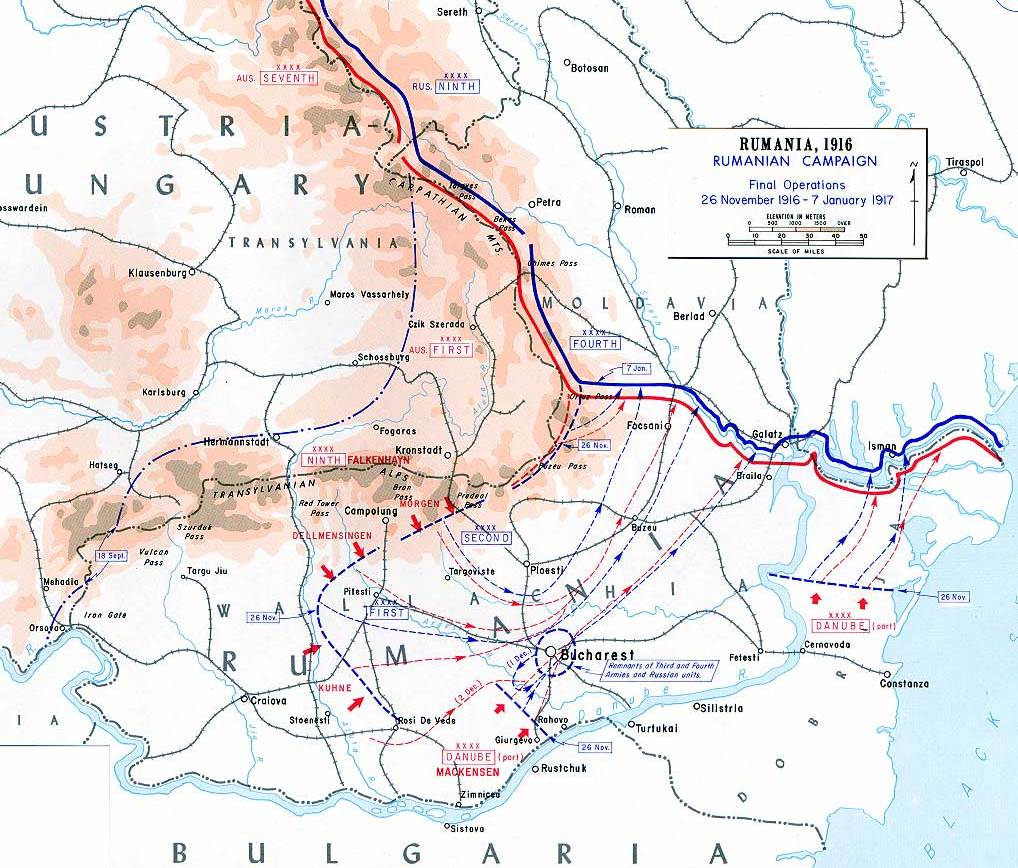
- The Romanian front at the start of the retreat
Date	29 November – 3 December 1916
Location	Northwest Muntenia, Romania
Result	Central Powers tactical victory Central Powers strategic failure: Romanian oil installations destroyed

Belligerents
Romania	German Empire; Austria-Hungary

Commanders and leaders
(Kingdom of Romania) Constantin Prezan (Kingdom of Romania) Ion Antonescu (Kingdom of Romania) Dumitru Stratilescu	(German Empire) Curt von Morgen (German Empire) Konrad Krafft von Dellmensingen

Units involved
1st Army (remnants)	I Reserve Corps; Gruppe Krafft

Strength
3 divisions (34,649 infantry)	6 divisions 2 brigades

Casualties and losses
Unknown total 30 November–1 December: 3,800 prisoners 14 guns captured	Unknown

The Pitești–Târgoviște Retreat was a fighting-withdrawal operation carried out by the Romanian 1st Army in the face of advancing Central Powers' (German and Austro-Hungarian) forces during World War I. The retreat lasted from 29 November to 3 December and culminated in a violent battle at Târgoviște, after which the entire Romanian Army started a general retreat towards Moldavia.

This operation was part of the wider Battle of Bucharest, which started on 28 November 1916.

== Background ==
By 26 November 1916, the situation for Allied Romania was dire. The Olt and the Danube rivers had been crossed and the Romanian defenses along the Jiu Valley (17 November) and the Olt Valley (25 November) had faltered. The first Romanian response to the debacle was a change of command. A mixed group of southern armies was created, and placed under the command of General Constantin Prezan and his talented operations officer, Captain Ion Antonescu. The two Romanian officers arrived at the 1st Army headquarters at Pitești on the morning of 23 November. Prezan's army group consisted in all of the Romanian forces except for Alexandru Averescu's 2nd Army and Constantin Cristescu's North Army. Prezan was widely regarded as more of a courtier than a serious army officer. Fortunately for the Romanians, his operations officer was Captain Ion Antonescu, "a talented if prickly individual". Such was the influence of Captain Antonescu that, in his memoirs, General Alexandru Averescu used the formula "Prezan (Antonescu)" to denote Prezan's plans and actions.

Sometime before 26 November, Prezan had changed the commander of the 1st Army, replacing General Paraschiv Vasilescu with General Dumitru Stratilescu. On the evening of 26 November, Prezan presented his plan, part of which envisioned the 1st Army forming a giant screen from east of Curtea de Argeș and along the southwest to the Olt River. The 1st Army, however, was in poor shape. As of 26 November, after months of heavy and costly fighting against the Germans and Austro-Hungarians, its forces had dwindled to 34,649 infantry soldiers in nine divisions, which in strength were actually the equivalent of little more than 3 divisions. General Henri Berthelot, head of the French military mission to Romania, requested that "in the name of the Entente" the 1st Army "resist on the spot", retreating only "step by step, destroying all means of communication possible".

== Retreat ==
=== Fall of Pitești and Câmpulung (29 November) ===
Given that Stratilescu's 1st Army was ordered to form its defensive screen from east of Curtea de Argeș, its units thus came into contact with Central Powers forces after 27 November, when General Konrad Krafft von Dellmensingen's corps captured Curtea de Argeș. It wasn't long before the heavily outnumbered Romanians steadily retreated from Pitești and Câmpulung, both towns being taken by the Central Powers on 29 November. The towns fell on the same day because different German-led forces took them. Pitești was taken by Krafft von Dellmensingen's forces, while Câmpulung was taken by General Curt von Morgen's corps. At Pitești, the 1st Army made a brief stand before being driven back. Krafft's Corps had five units: an Alpine Corpskl. Division, the 73rd Austro-Hungarian Division, the 2nd and 10th Austro-Hungarian Mountain Brigades, plus the 216th German Infantry Division which had arrived on 7 November. Von Morgen's I Reserve Corps initially comprised the German 89th Infantry Division and the Austro-Hungarian 71st Infantry Division, to which the 12th Bavarian Division was later added.

=== 30 November–1 December ===
On 30 November, after the 12th Bavarian Infantry Division had occupied Câmpulung on the 29th, Morgen's 8th Mountain Brigade took Mount Leaota. The closeness of the pursuit gave the Romanians no respite, and exhausted men started surrendering in growing numbers. On that day Morgen's forces took 3,000 prisoners. In the evening of 30 November, after having occupied Pitești on the morning of the 29th, Gruppe Krafft's Alpine Corps were given a period of rest in the forest near Davidești, in the midst of several unsuspecting Romanian regiments. At dawn, the surprised Romanians were attacked and scattered, leaving behind over 800 prisoners and 14 guns.

=== Battle of Târgoviște (3 December) ===
Having taken 3,000 prisoners on 30 November, Morgen's corps reached Târgoviște three days later. The Romanians mounted a determined defence against the 12th Bavarian Infantry Division and could only be driven back at bayonet point. The division's bicycle company shot an attacking Romanian cavalry regiment to pieces. At 2:30 pm on 3 December, the Bavarians took Târgoviște by storm. Having taken Mount Leaota on 30 November, the 8th Mountain Brigade also took Pietroșița on that same day (3 December).

== Aftermath ==
The Pitești–Târgoviște Retreat happened at the same time as the Battle of the Argeș. The Romanians attacked on 1 December, pushing the 217th Division from Mihăilești 6 miles (9.7 km) southwest towards Stâlpu. However, the Central Powers counterattacked on 3 December, pushing the Romanians back and retaking Mihăilești by 4 pm on that day. The Central Powers in the region did not advance on the next day, spending 4 December carrying out mop-up operations.

The Romanians ultimately managed to delay the German advance long enough for the British embassy to organize the sabotage of the Romanian oil wells. The oil installations at Târgoviște were set ablaze on 26 and 27 November. Those at Moreni followed on the 28th, with those at Ploiești being gutted on 5-6 December, just before the arrival of the Central Powers forces. Erich Ludendorff made the following appraisal in his memoirs: "The Rumanians, under English orders and directions, had effected a very thorough destruction of the oil-fields.".

Following the battles of Argeș and Târgoviște, some officers of the French military mission wanted the Romanians to make a stand to the west of Bucharest and Ploiești. However, the MCG (Marele Cartier General/Romanian General Staff) rightly argued that this would only serve to completely destroy the remaining Romanian forces. General Berthelot agreed, and - on 5 December, after further discussions which included the King of Romania - orders were given for a retreat to the northeast.
