= Alba (Șușița) =

- Location within Romania

Location
- Country: Romania
- Counties: Vrancea County
- Villages: Mărăști, Răcoasa

Physical characteristics
- Mouth: Șușița
  - location: Răcoasa
  - coordinates: 45°59′14″N 26°52′27″E
  - elevation: 382 m (1,253 ft)
- Length: 10 km (6.2 mi)
- Basin size: 26 km^{2} (10 sq mi)

Basin features
- Progression: Șușița→ Siret→ Danube→ Black Sea
- Tributaries
  - right: Andra

The Alba is a left tributary of the river Șușița in Romania. It discharges into the Șușița in Răcoasa. Its length is 10 km (6.2 mi) and its basin size is 26 km^{2} (10 sq mi).
