= Josef Roth von Limanowa-Łapanów =

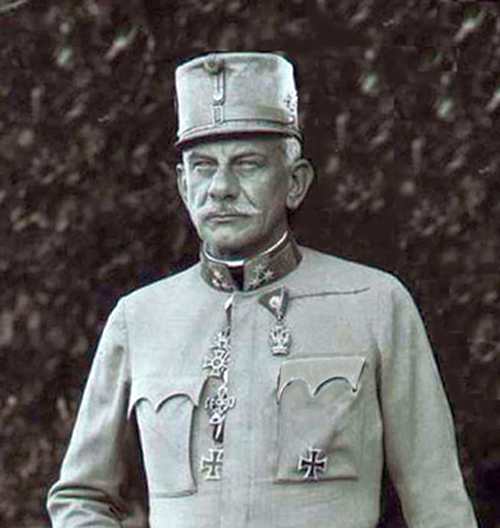
- Josef Roth as a General of the Infantry
- Born: October 12, 1859; Trieste, Austrian Empire
- Died: April 9, 1927 (aged 67); Vienna, Austria
- Burial place: Vienna Central Cemetery, Vienna, Austria
- Alma mater: Theresian Military Academy
- Spouse: Melanie Lasansky
- Children: 4
- Military career
- Allegiance: Austria-Hungary
- Branch: Austro-Hungarian Army
- Service years: 1879 – 1918
- Rank: Generaloberst
- Conflicts: World War I: Eastern front; Battle of Limanowa; Battle of Gorlice Tarnow; Battle of Lublin; Italian front; Battle of Caporetto

Josef Freiherr Roth von Limanowa-Łapanów, commonly known as Josef Roth was an Austro-Hungarian Generaloberst during World War I as well as a Privy Councilor while commanding the XIV Corps throughout the war.

== Biography ==
Josef Roth was born in Trieste where his father was garrisoned at as he was an Austrian officer himself. After attending the cadet school at Sankt Pölten, he entered the Theresian Military Academy and graduated on April 4, 1879, and served as a lieutenant in the 21st Feldjäger Battalion. On May 1, 1884, Roth was promoted to lieutenant. After graduating from war school in Vienna, he was promoted to First Lieutenant in the 71st Infantry Brigade at Fiume but was transferred 13th Infantry Brigade at Esseg and then to the XII Corps at Esseg. On November 1, 1889, Roth was promoted to captain and placed on the General Staff.

In 1895, he was promoted to major, he was assigned to the staff of the 12th Infantry Division in Kraków. In 1897, he was employed in the same way at the V Corps staff in Pressburg, with promotion to lieutenant colonel on May 1, 1898. In 1900, Roth was transferred to the 76th Infantry Regiment in Graz for a short period of time, and on May 1, 1901, he was promoted to colonel and was head of the newly established "General Staff Office for Instructional Work and Exercises".

After being promoted to major general on May 1, 1908, he became commander of the 94th Infantry Brigade in Tolmein in the same year and on April 1, 1910, commander of the Theresian Military Academy. On May 1, 1912, Roth was promoted to Field Marshal Lieutenant in this capacity.

At the beginning of the World War I, he was given command of the 3rd Infantry Troops Division of the XIV Corps on August 5, 1914, and then on October 1, 1914, of the XIV Corps. After an army group with eight Austrian infantry troop divisions, three Austrian cavalry troop divisions, one German infantry division and three Polish legions had been formed shortly after the outbreak of war, he was given command of this army group which was known as Roth. At the Battle of Limanowa, he succeeded in preventing the Russian forces from breaking through between the 4th and 3rd Imperial and Royal Army and the threatening encirclement of Kraków to fend off at.

Army Group Roth continued to fight in the Eastern front, including at the Battle of Gorlice Tarnow and the Battle of Lublin.

Promoted to general of infantry on September 1, 1915, Roth was ordered to the Italian front, where he was assigned to the Tyrolean Defense Command. He then took command of the IV and V Corps. In March 1916 he was appointed commander of the defense of Tyrol. After the end of the Battle of Asiago, Roth became the commanding general of the XX. Corps. He was not given a higher rank however because his direct superior, Archduke Eugen of Austria, despite considering him to be an excellent general, classified him as too soft and considerate in dealing with his subordinate units.

On May 19, 1916, he was given the title "Privy Councilor" and on June 11, 1916, the title of "Knight of" was awarded. He received the title "Limanowa-Lapanów" at his request on September 4, 1916.

In the months that followed, Limanowa-Lapanow once again gained merit as a corps commander. After the success of the Battle of Caporetto, the defensive front in the Dolomites was over and the army high command looked for a new use for Roth. Chief of Staff Franz Conrad von Hötzendorf, who agreed with Archduke Eugen in his assessment of Roth, added: "A decent, chivalrous character, more reserved than energetic, albeit fearless and brave, he does not seem suited to taking command of an army. He is more suitable to take up the position of inspector in military training as he has heart and understanding for the youth.”

For this assessment, on February 15, 1918, Roth was appointed Inspector General of the Military Educational Institutions. On February 1, he was promoted to Generaloberst on February 25, 1918.

On October 2, 1918, Roth was awarded the Knight's Cross of the Military Order of Maria Theresa by Emperor Karl I, and in accordance with the Order's statutes, he was elevated to the status of baron on October 10, 1918, by a decree from the Most High (AH) at Schönbrunn Palace.

After the peace agreement with Russia, the released prisoners of war flowed back to Austria-Hungary. The army leadership, which was still responsible for the soldiers who had been released from captivity and wanted to reintegrate them into the army, feared that there were also Bolshevist sympathizers and other so-called subversive elements among them. Therefore, the post of "General Inspector for Returnees" was created and transferred to Generaloberst Roth, in addition to his previous duties. Generaloberst Roth remained in these positions until the end of the war.

He retired on December 31, 1918, and lived at his home in Vienna, but continued to be involved in various institutions. He was President of the "Verein Alt-Neustadt", President of the "Officers' Society", 1st President of the "Reich Comradeship and Warrior Association" and Chairman of the "Supreme Officers' Council". From 1925 he was also President of the Chapter of the Military Order of Maria Theresa.

After his death on April 9, 1927, at the age of 69, Limanowa-Lapanów was buried in the Vienna Central Cemetery (Group 81B, No. 54). From 1891 he was married to Countess Melanie Lasansky and they had two sons and two daughters.
