= Panciu =

- Town
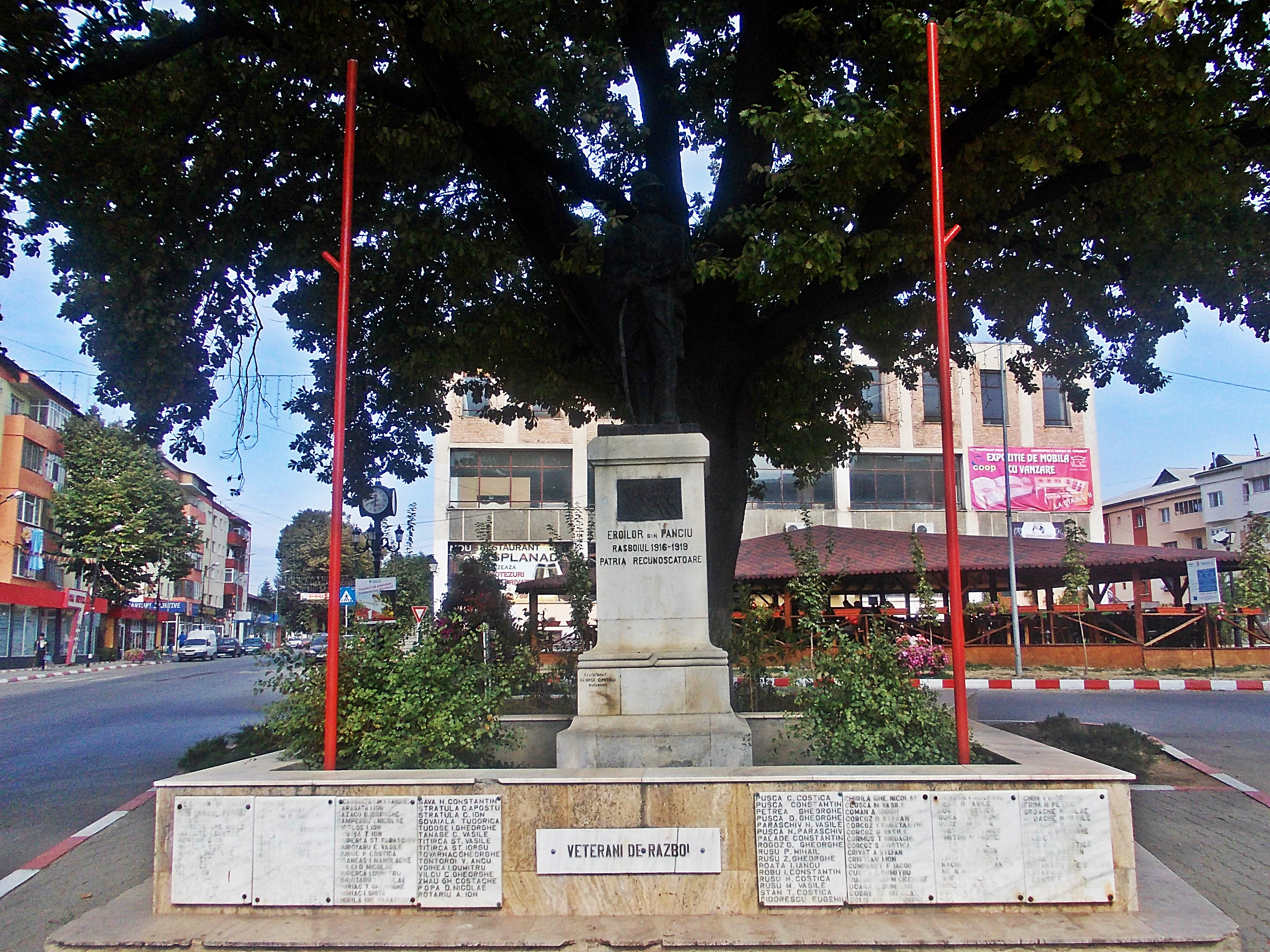
- World War I monument

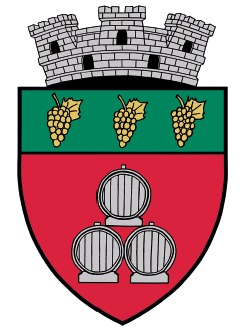
- Coat of arms

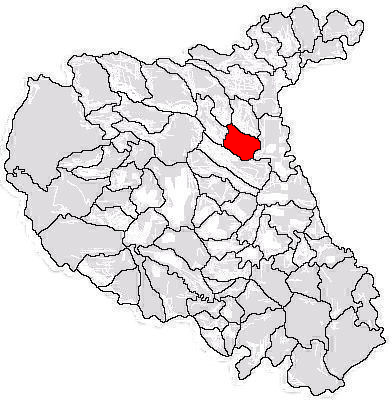
- Location in Vrancea County

- Location in Romania
- Coordinates: 45°54′36″N 27°5′24″E
- Country: Romania
- County: Vrancea

Government
  - Mayor (2024–2028): Nicolai Mărăscu (PNL)
- Area: 61.85 km^{2} (23.88 sq mi)
- Elevation: 258 m (846 ft)
- Population (2021-12-01): 6,921
  - Density: 111.9/km^{2} (289.8/sq mi)
- Time zone: UTC+02:00 (EET)
  - Summer (DST): UTC+03:00 (EEST)
- Postal code: 625300
- Area code: +(40) 237
- Vehicle reg.: VN
- Website: www.primaria-panciu.ro

Panciu (Romanian pronunciation: [ˈpant͡ʃju]) is a town in Vrancea County, Romania. It lies on the river Șușița, in the southern part of Western Moldavia, 30 km (19 mi) northwest of Focșani. It administers five villages: Crucea de Jos, Crucea de Sus, Dumbrava, Neicu, and Satu Nou.

The town is located in the east-central part of the county, on the banks of the Șușița River. The region is famous for its white wines but also for its sparkling wines (white, red and rosé).

At the 2021 census, the town a population of 6,921; of those, 86% were Romanians and 2.5% Roma.

Writer Ioan Slavici died in Panciu in 1926, and was buried at the hermitage within Brazi Monastery.

== Natives ==
- Stelian Isac (born 1981), footballer
- Dan Nica (born 1960), engineer and politician

Historical population
Year	Pop.	±%
1912	2,737	—
1930	6,816	+149.0%
1948	4,523	−33.6%
1956	7,679	+69.8%
1966	7,948	+3.5%
1977	7,766	−2.3%
1992	10,016	+29.0%
2002	8,903	−11.1%
2011	7,664	−13.9%
2021	6,921	−9.7%
Source: Census data
