= Friedrich von Gerok (officer) =

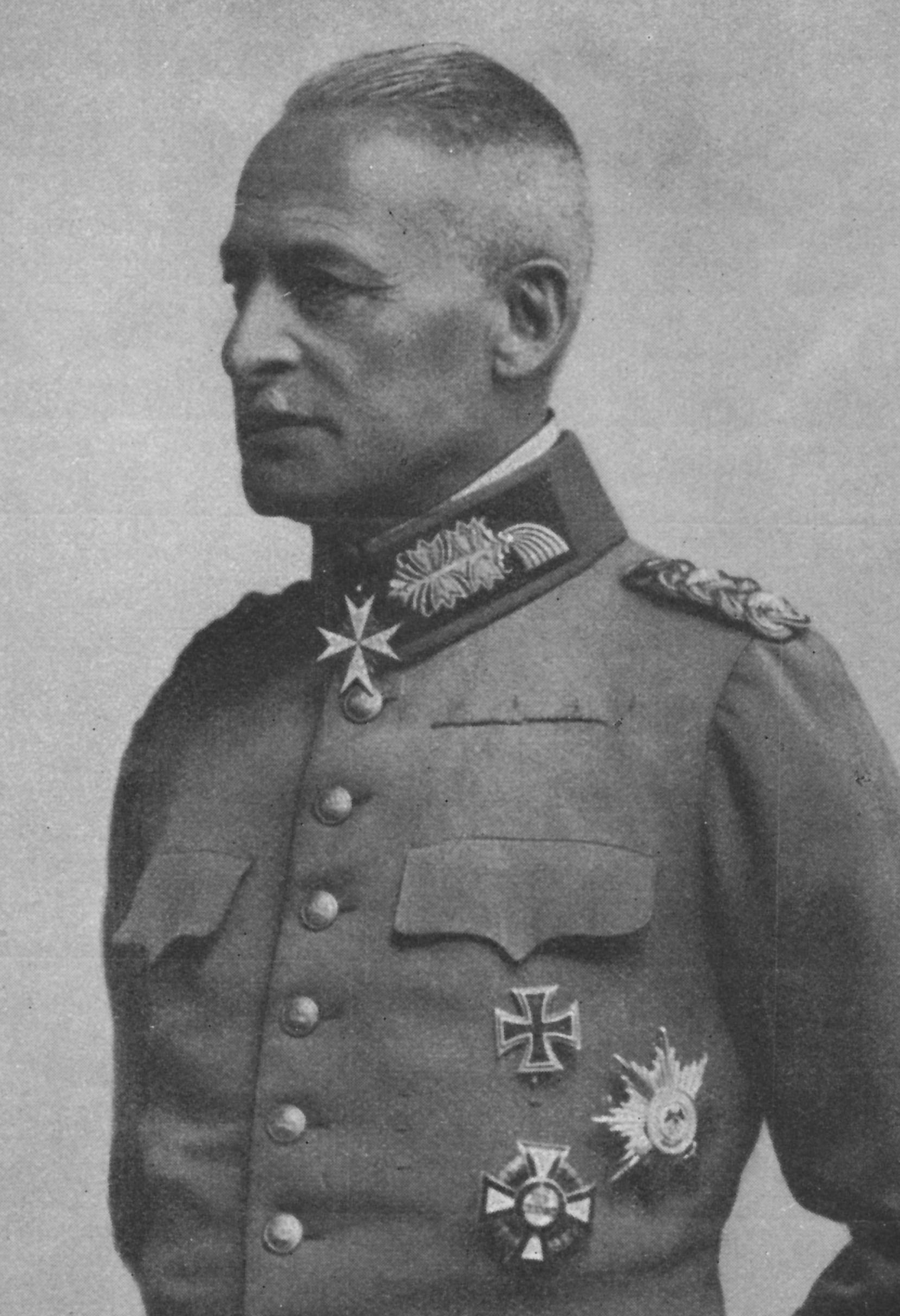
Friedrich von Gerok

Karl Christof Friedrich von Gerok (26 May 1854 – 18 September 1937 in Stuttgart) was an officer of Württemberg, general of the infantry of the XXIV Reserve Corps during World War I.

== Career ==
Gerok entered the "Queen Olga" Grenadier Regiment (1st Württemberg) No. 119 on 4 April 1872 as a Fahnenjunker; on 11 November 1872 he was named Fähnrich and on 17 October 1873 promoted to second lieutenant. On 23 May 1881 he was transferred to the "King Karl" Grenadier Regiment (5th Württemberg) No. 123, with a simultaneous promotion to first lieutenant. Until 29 September 1885 he served as regimental adjutant; he then became adjutant of the 54th Infantry Brigade in Ulm, part of the 27th Division, and on 18 August 1888 became a captain. He was then transferred as a company leader to the "King Wilhelm I" Infantry Regiment (6th Württemberg) No. 124. From 28 December 1893 to 23 February 1897, he functioned as adjutant to the XIII (Royal Württemberg) Army Corps, becoming a major on 18 June 1895 and then Commander of the 3rd battalion of the "Kaiser Friedrich, King of Prussia" Infantry Regiment (7th Württemberg) No. 125. On his promotion to lieutenant colonel, he was transferred on 7 July 1907 to the staff of the "Freiherr von Sparr" Infantry (3rd Westphalian) No. 16. On 1 April 1903, he became a member of the Reichsmilitärgericht, the highest court of the Army under German military law. On 19 July 1904 he resigned from the court and with a simultaneous promotion to colonel, took command of the "Grand Duke Friedrich of Baden" Infantry Regiment (8th Württemberg) No. 126. On 18 August 1908 he was promoted to major general and to command of the 54th Infantry Brigade in Ulm. Following his promotion to lieutenant general on 21 April 1911, he served as commander of the 26th division (1st Royal Württemberg). One and a half years later, on 21 September 1912, he was appointed Governor of Ulm.

Following the outbreak of World War I, Gerok was appointed commander of the 54th Reserve Division (2nd Royal Württemberg) on 25 August 1914, and on 30 August promoted to the rank of infantry general. He was succeeded as divisional commander by Infantry General Paul von Schaefer and on 11 September 1914 appointed general in command of the XXIV Reserve Corps. He led them in battle first on the Western Front in the Battle of Lille (26–28 October 1914) and the First Battle of Ypres (30 October–22 November 1914). The corps were then withdrawn and sent to the Eastern Front, where they first saw action at the Battle of Łódź. From 13 May until 9 August 1916, they took part in the Battle of Verdun and then moved into the Carpathians, where Gerok also served simultaneously until 24 November 1917 as commander of the Army Group named for him. He led the corps in the battles for terrain in Champagne and at Rheims, until 18 February 1918. He was then relieved and once more appointed Governor of Ulm. He carried out this function until 22 May 1918, when he was unassigned until his final dismissal from duty on 10 June 1918. With effect from that date, he was assigned à la suite to the "King Karl" Grenadier Regiment (5th Württemberg) No. 123 by King William II of Württemberg.

== Decorations ==
- Iron Cross (1914) 2nd and 1st Class
- Pour le Mérite, 7 July 1915
- Grand Cross, Order of the Red Eagle
- Order of the Crown 1st Class with swords
- Commander 2nd Class, Order of the Zähringer Lion
- Bavarian Military Merit Order 2nd Class with star
- Officer's Cross of the Albert Order
- Grand Cross of the Order of the Württemberg Crown
- Commander, Württemberg Military Merit Order, 11 January 1918
- Commander 1st Class, Friedrich Order
- Württemberg Service Award 1st Class
- Order of the Iron Crown 1st Class
- Austro-Hungarian Military Merit Cross 1st Class with War Decoration
