= Soveja =

- Commune
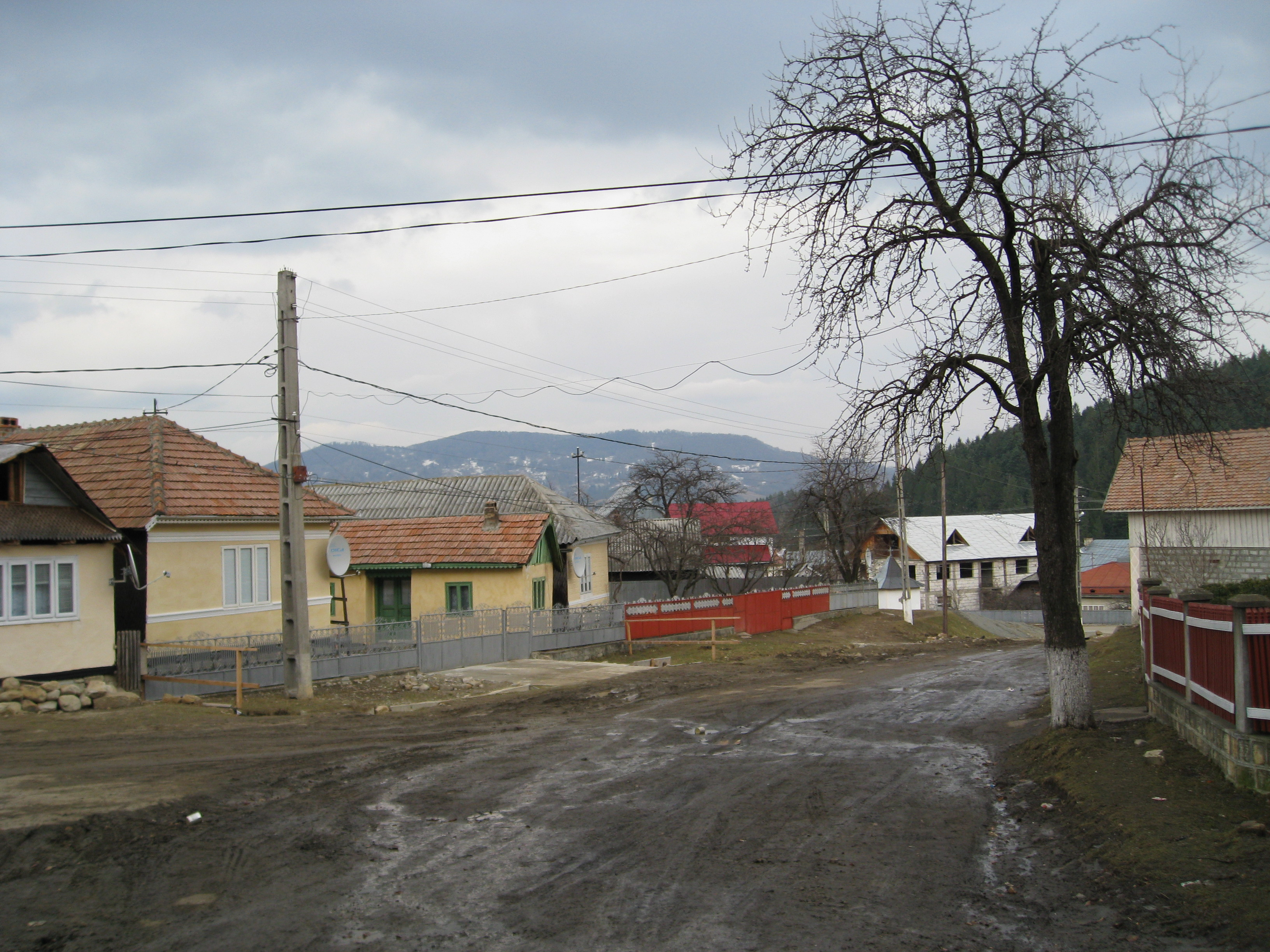

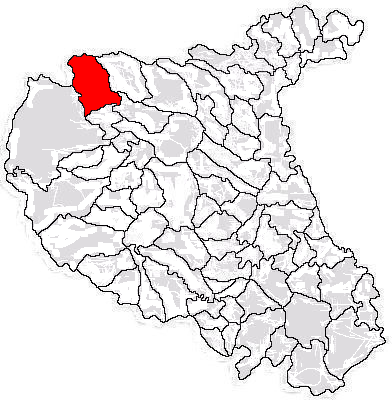
- Location in Vrancea County

- Location in Romania
- Coordinates: 46°0′N 26°39′E
- Country: Romania
- County: Vrancea

Government
  - Mayor (2024–2028): Ionuț Filimon (PNL)
- Area: 94.12 km^{2} (36.34 sq mi)
- Elevation: 555 m (1,821 ft)
- Population (2021-12-01): 2,007
  - Density: 21.32/km^{2} (55.23/sq mi)
- Time zone: UTC+02:00 (EET)
  - Summer (DST): UTC+03:00 (EEST)
- Postal code: 627320
- Area code: +(40) 237
- Vehicle reg.: VN
- Website: comunasoveja.ro

Soveja is a commune located in Vrancea County, Romania. It is composed of two villages, Dragosloveni and Rucăreni; the former is the commune centre.

Historical population
Year	Pop.	±%
2002	2,725	—
2011	2,159	−20.8%
2021	2,007	−7.0%
Source: Census data

== Notable people ==
- Simion Mehedinți (1868–1962), geographer
