= Răcoasa =

- Commune
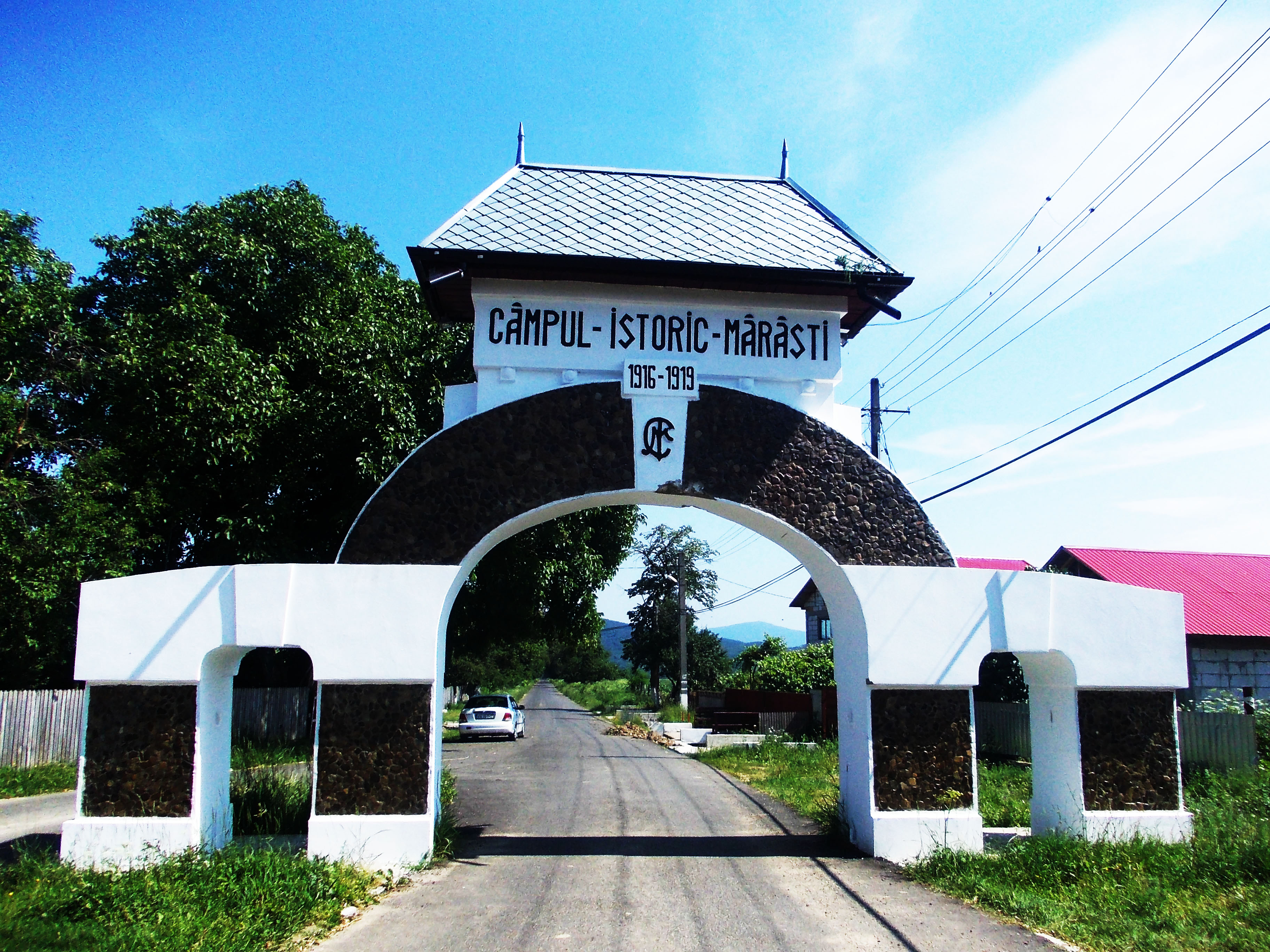
- Battle of Mărăști memorial site

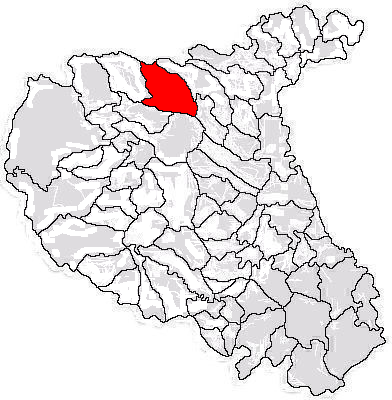
- Location in Vrancea County

- Location in Romania
- Coordinates: 46°0′N 26°53′E
- Country: Romania
- County: Vrancea

Government
  - Mayor (2024–2028): Vladimir-Sebastian Păun (PSD)
- Area: 89 km^{2} (34 sq mi)
- Elevation: 318 m (1,043 ft)
- Population (2021-12-01): 3,148
  - Density: 35/km^{2} (92/sq mi)
- Time zone: UTC+02:00 (EET)
  - Summer (DST): UTC+03:00 (EEST)
- Postal code: 627280
- Area code: +(40) 237
- Vehicle reg.: VN
- Website: www.primariaracoasa.ro

Răcoasa is a commune located in Vrancea County, Romania. It is composed of five villages: Gogoiu, Mărăști, Răcoasa, Varnița, and Verdea. It is situated in the historical region of Western Moldavia.

Mărăști village (Romanian pronunciation: [mərəˈʃtʲ]) was the site of the World War I Battle of Mărăști.

Historical population
| Year | Pop. | ±% |
|---|---|---|
| 2002 | 3,472 | — |
| 2011 | 3,162 | −8.9% |
| 2021 | 3,148 | −0.4% |
Source: Census data

== Notable people ==
- Aurel Iancu (born 1928), economist
- Gheorghe Vlădescu-Răcoasa (1895 – 1989), sociologist, journalist, left-wing politician, and diplomat
