= List of Austro-Hungarian colonel generals =

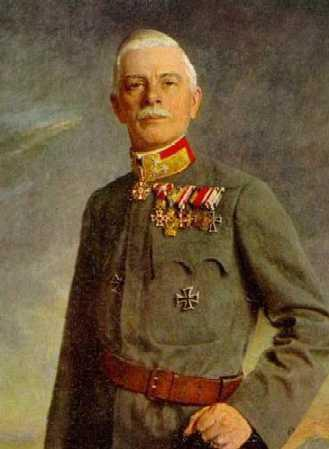
Rudolf Stöger-Steiner von Steinstätten as colonel general (Generaloberst).

Insignia of an Austro-Hungarian Army colonel general

The following is a list of Austro-Hungarian colonel generals of the Austro-Hungarian Army.

From 1915 to 1918 in the Austro-Hungarian Army, colonel general (German: Generaloberst, Hungarian: Vezérezredes) was an officer rank second only to the rank of field marshal (German: Feldmarschall, Hungarian: Tábornagy) .

In the Austrian Armed Forces of today, there is no rank of colonel general.

== List ==
This is a list of Austro-Hungarian colonel generals. Those generals later promoted to field marshal are not included. For colonel generals later promoted to field marshal, see List of Austrian field marshals.

Promoted	Name	Born	Died	Notes
1916	Archduke Josef Ferdinand of Austria	1872	1942	Commander-in -Chief of the 4th Army and Chief Inspector of the Austro-Hungarian Imperial and Royal Aviation Troops (German: K.u.K. Luftfahrtruppen)
1916	Friedrich Graf von Beck-Rzikowsky	1830	1920	Former Chief of the General Staff of the Austrian-Hungarian Army (1881–1906)
1916	Eduard Graf Paar	1837	1919	Emperor's adjutant general of Franz Joseph I
1916	Arthur Freiherr von Bolfras	1838	1922	Imperial Adjutant General, Chief of the Emperor’s Military Office
1916	Friedrich Freiherr von Georgi	1852	1926	Minister of War (German: Landesverteidigungsminister)
1916	Karl Freiherr von Pflanzer-Baltin	1855	1925	Commander-in-Chief 7th Army. Later, Commander-in-Chief all of Imperial and Royal forces in Army Group Albania
1916	Viktor Graf von Dankl	1854	1921	Commander-in-Chief of the 1st Army
1916	Karl Tersztyánszky von Nádas	1854	1921	Commander-in-Chief of the 4th Army (succeeded Archduke Joseph Ferdinand)
1916	Paul Freiherr Puhallo von Brlog	1856	1926	Commander-in-Chief of the 1st and 3rd Armies
1916	Archduke Leopold Salvator of Austria	1863	1931	Artillery staff
1916	Karl Graf von Kirchbach auf Lauterbach	1856	1939	Commander-in-Chief of the 3rd and 4th Armies
1917	Adolf von Rhemen	1855	1932	Governor-general of Serbia
1917	Karl Graf Huyn	1857	1938	Commanding General XVII Corps, Military Governor of Galicia
1917	Hermann Kusmanek von Burgneustädten	1860	1934	Commandant of the Przemyśl Fortress
1917	Karl Křitek	1861	1928	Commander-in-Chief of the 7th Army
1917	Wenzel Freiherr von Wurm	1859	1921	Commander-in-Chief of the 4th Army
1917	Samuel Freiherr von Hazai	1851	1942	Royal Hungarian Honvéd Minister, Chief of the Ersatzwesen (replacements, reinforcements, and recruits)
1917	Leopold Freiherr von Hauer	1854	1933	Commanding General of a Cavalry Corps
1917	Viktor Graf von Scheuchenstuel	1857	1938	Commander-in-Chief of the 11th Army
1917	Stephan Freiherr Sarkotić von Lovčen	1858	1939	Commander-in-Chief and Governor of Bosnia and Herzegovina
1918	Josef Freiherr Roth von Limanowa-Lapanów	1859	1927	Commander-in-Chief of the XX Corps
1918	Arthur Freiherr Arz von Straussenburg	1857	1935	Chief of the General Staff of the Austrian-Hungarian Army 1917–1918
1918	Hugo Martiny von Malastów	1860	1940	Commanding General III Army Corps
1918	Rudolf Freiherr Stöger-Steiner von Steinstätten	1861	1921	Minister of War
1918	Alois Fürst Schönburg-Hartenstein	1858	1944	Commander-in-Chief of the 6th Army

== See also ==
- Supreme commanders of the Imperial and Royal Armed Forces
- Comparative officer ranks of World War I
- List of Austrian field marshals
- Army ranks and insignia of the Austro-Hungarian Army
- List of German colonel generals
- List of colonel generals
