= Karl Křitek =

Austrian general

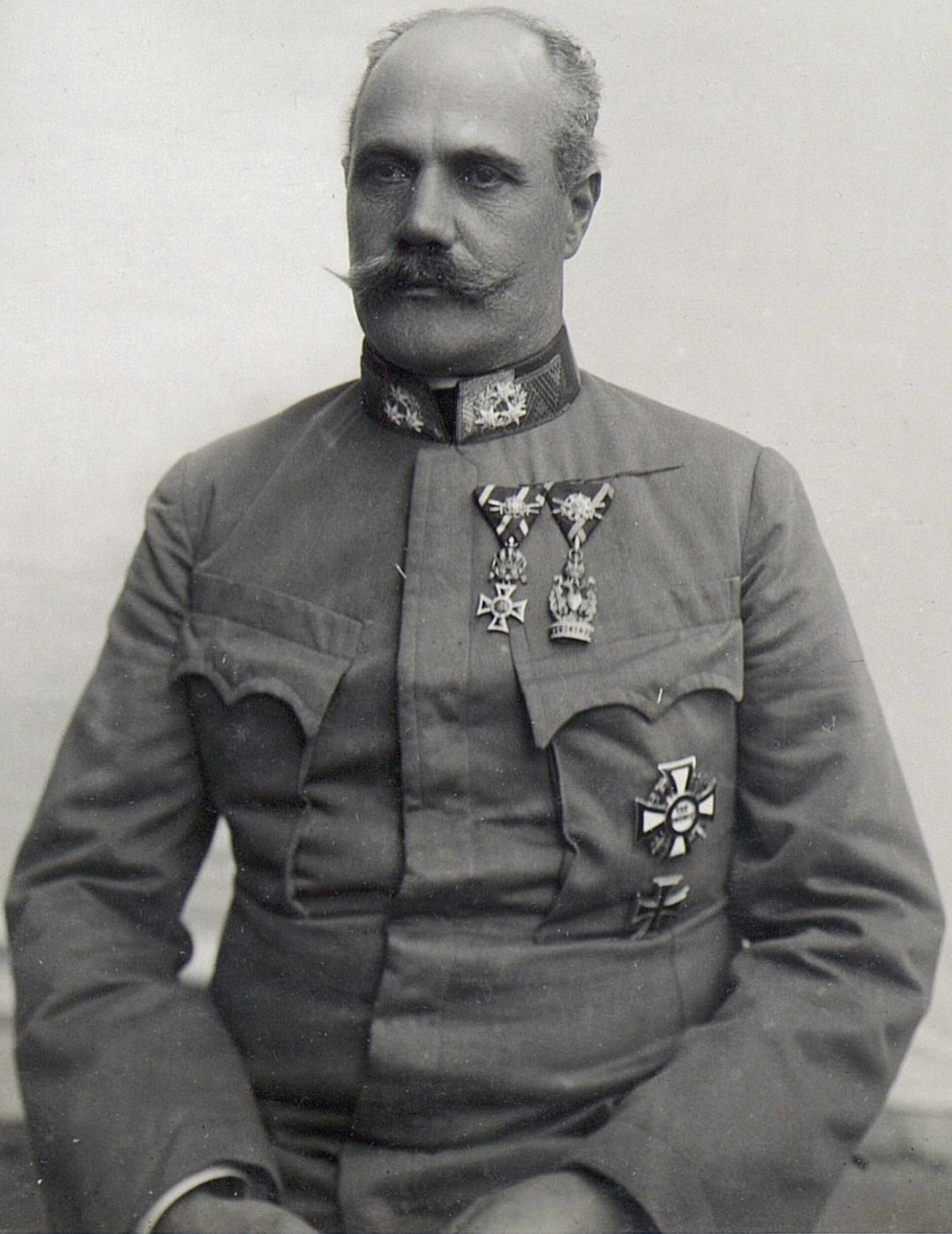
- Křitek in 1917
- Born: 24 October 1861; Split, Kingdom of Dalmatia, Austrian Empire
- Died: 3 September 1928 (aged 66); Vienna, Austria
- Military career
- Allegiance: Austro-Hungarian Empire
- Branch: Austro-Hungarian Army
- Service years: 1879–1918
- Rank: Generaloberst
- Commands: XVII Corps; 3rd Army; 7th Army
- Conflicts: World War I: Eastern Front; Carpathian Front; Italian Front
- Awards: Order of Leopold (Grand Cross)

Karl Křitek (24 October 1861 – 3 September 1928) was an Austro-Hungarian Army general. He notably commanded several armies during World War I.

== Biography ==
Karl Křitek was born on 28 October 1854 in Split as son of Johann Victor Křitek (1830–1904), a military commissioner. He went to a military school in Mährisch-Weisskirchen before entering the Theresian Military Academy in Vienna in 1876. He graduated three years later and was commissioned into the 52nd Infantry Regiment. Late he went to war school and then served on the staffs of the 40th Infantry Brigade and 13th Infantry Division. In May 1888 he was permanently transferred to the general staff, promoted to Hauptmann and assigned to the staff of the XII Corps. In November 1894, after having served in the 49th Infantry Regiment, Křitek was promoted to Major and named Chief of Staff of the 8th Infantry Division. In 1897 he was given the rank of Lieutenant Colonel. After the turn of the century he, now an Oberst, was assigned to head the general staff's Landesbeschreibungsbüro (Area Studies Division). He expanded and improved the bureau until returning to command duty as a general, first as Generalmajor and commander of the 20th Infantry Brigade in 1906, then as Feldmarschallleutnant leading the 49th Infantry Division in 1910.

When World War I began in 1914 he commanded the 26th Landwehr Infantry Division, leading it during the Battle of Galicia. Shortly afterwards, in October, he was promoted to General of the Infantry and succeeded Karl Georg Huyn in command of the XVII Corps. Křitek led it at the Eastern and Carpathian fronts before he and the corps were transferred to the Italian Front in early 1916, participating in the Trentino Offensive. He had a mixed record as a corps commander. His commanding officer General Svetozar Boroević, who had rated him as not suitable for a higher command back in the Carpathians, totally changed his assessment of him after they served together in Italy.

In early 1917 he returned to the Eastern Front. Initially given command of the X Corps, half a year later Křitek succeeded Karl Tersztyánszky von Nádas as commander of the 3rd Army. Meanwhile, he had been promoted to Generaloberst on 1 May 1917. In early 1918 his army was absorbed by the 7th Army. He accordingly received command of the latter and fought in Operation Faustschlag. The 1918 offensive forced the fledgling Russian Soviet Republic back on the table for the Treaty of Brest-Litovsk and thus out of the war. He commanded the 7th Army until it was disbanded in April. Křitek officially retired on 1 December 1918.

He eventually died in Vienna on 3 September 1928.

== Decorations ==
Among his decorations and recognitions were:

- 1908 Jubilee Cross
- Bronze Jubilee Medal for the Armed Forces
- Long Service Cross for Officers 2nd Class
- Decoration for Services to the Red Cross 1st Class (with War Decoration)
- Bronze Military Merit Medal
- Order of the Iron Crown 1st Class (with Swords and War Decoration)
- Grand Cross of the Order of Leopold (with Swords and War Decoration)
- Military Merit Cross 1st Class (with Swords and War Decoration)
- Geheimrat
- Iron Cross, 1st and 2nd Classes (Prussia)

== See also ==
- List of Austro-Hungarian colonel generals
