= Kerensky offensive =

1917 – Last Russian offensive of World War I

- Part of the Eastern Front of World War I
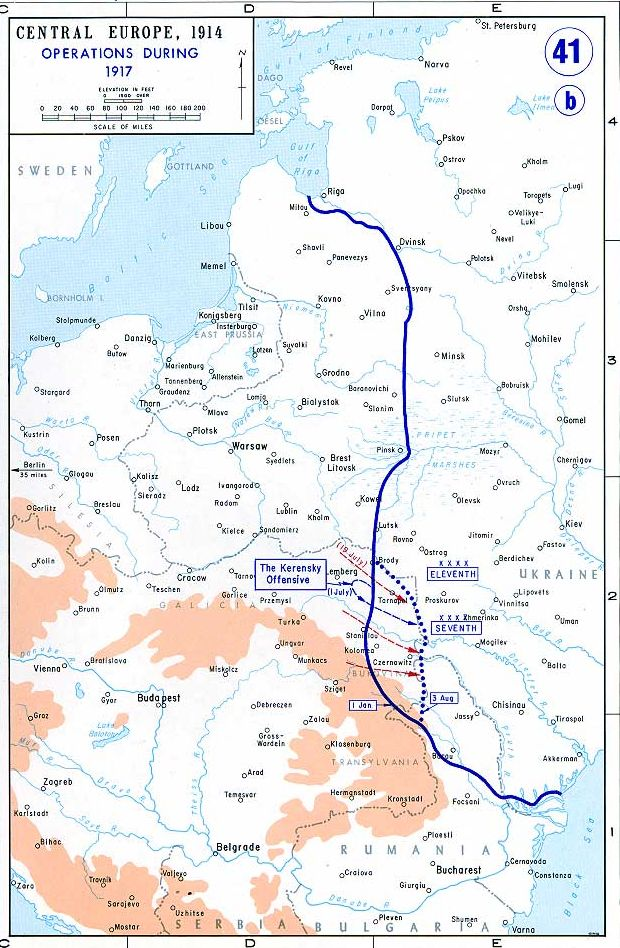
- The Kerensky offensive and its aftermath.
Date	1–19 July 1917
Location	Galicia, Central Europe
Result	Central Powers victory

Belligerents
Russian Republic; Romania	Germany; Austria-Hungary; Ottoman Empire

Commanders and leaders
(Russia) Aleksei Brusilov; (Russia) Aleksei Gutor; (Russia) Lavr Kornilov	(German Empire) Leopold of Bavaria; (Austria-Hungary) Eduard von Böhm-Ermolli; (German Empire) Felix Graf von Bothmer

Units involved
(Russia) Southwestern Front: 11th Army; 7th Army; 8th Army	(German Empire) / (Austria-Hungary) / (Ottoman Empire) Army Group Böhm-Ermolli: 2nd Army; South Army; 3rd Army

Strength
900,000	260,000

Casualties and losses
38,722–58,329 casualties, including 6,905 killed; other sources state 125,000–200,000 casualties which included 40,000 killed, and 20,000 wounded 42,726 deserters	82,000 casualties, including 37,000 captured

The Kerensky offensive (Russian: Наступление Керенского), also called the summer offensive, the June offensive (Russian: Июньское наступление) in Russia, or the July offensive in Western historiography, took place from 1 July [O.S. 18 June] to 19 July [O.S. 6 July] 1917 and was the last Russian offensive of World War I, named after the minister of war, Alexander Kerensky. (Note: The offensive began in June by the Julian calendar that was used in Russia at the time and in July by the Gregorian calendar.) After the abdication of Emperor Nicholas II during the February Revolution, the Russian Provisional Government pledged to fulfill Russia's existing commitments to the Triple Entente, which included launching an offensive in the spring of 1917. The operation was directed at capturing Lemberg and the rest of Galicia from Austria-Hungary.

The Southwestern Front (Note: A front was the Russian equivalent of an army group.) of the Russian Army was chosen for the offensive, because it was the least affected by revolutionary agitation and would mostly be fighting Austria-Hungary, which had not fully recovered from the Brusilov offensive. The main attack was launched by the 7th Army and 11th Army, which made a limited advance, though the 11th Army's Czechoslovak Brigade notably captured the town of Zborov from the Austro-Hungarians. Further to the south, General Lavr Kornilov's 8th Army was more successful, pushing back the Austro-Hungarian 3rd Army and creating a breach along the front that was 30 kilometres (19 miles) wide, leading to the capture of the towns of Kalush and Galich. Secondary attacks to assist the main offensive were also launched by the Russian Western, Northern, and Romanian Fronts in other locations, but they were mostly unsuccessful, with the exception of the one in the Romanian theatre.

The advance achieved in the first days was in large part due to the volunteer shock battalions that were recruited and organised by the Provisional Government in the spring of 1917. But they were too few in number to hold the line against a counterattack by German reinforcements, and the regular infantry were less reliable. The Russian forces were then pushed back after 19 July, losing all of the territory they had gained. The Germans and Austro-Hungarians continued advancing into Russian territory by as much as 120 kilometres (75 miles). By the time the German counter-offensive was over on 5 August, nearly all of Eastern Galicia had been retaken by the Central Powers. The retreat of the Russian army eventually stopped, and Kornilov managed to stabilise the front by mid-August, but the failure of the operation eliminated the offensive potential of the Russian Army.

The offensive was a disaster for Kerensky and the Provisional Government, contributing to the July Days and the Kornilov affair. Kornilov, the leader of the most successful 8th Army, was appointed the commander of the Southwestern Front, and then Supreme Commander-in-Chief just days later, because Kerensky hoped he could restore discipline and order among the retreating troops. He also gained support from conservative circles, and in September they decided to launch a coup against the Petrograd Soviet. But the Kornilov coup failed when his troops refused to fight, and instead it strengthened the revolutionary tendencies among soldiers. The collapse of the Provisional Government's popularity as a result of the offensive, and even more so after the Kornilov coup, was critical to the Bolsheviks increasing their influence over both the Russian Army and the Petrograd Soviet on the eve of the October Revolution.

== Background ==
=== Initial planning ===
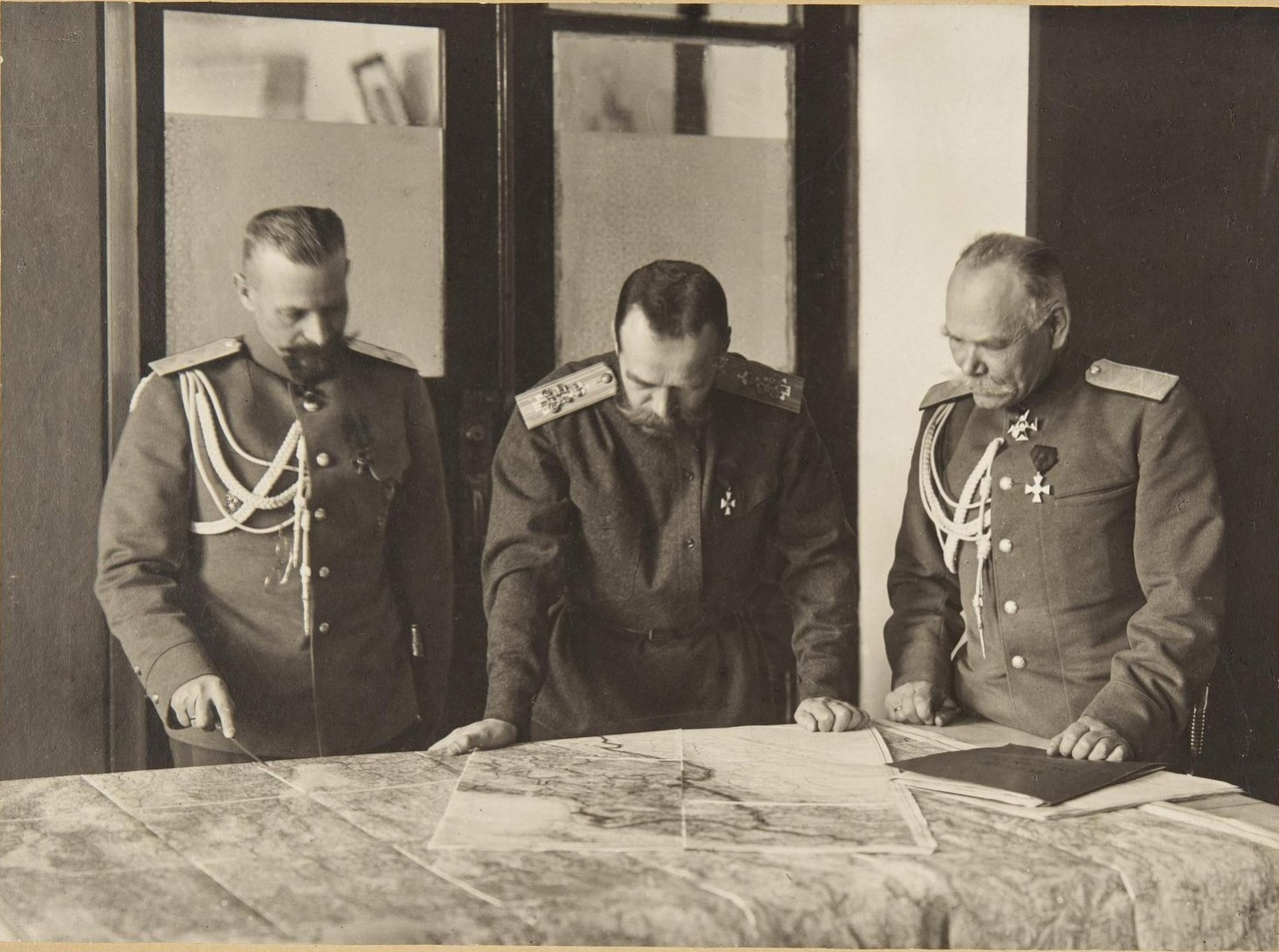
Nicholas II as the supreme commander with chief of staff Alekseyev (right)

The British and French high commands held a conference in Chantilly, France, in November 1916 to decide on a strategic plan for the Entente war effort in 1917. The Stavka, the Russian high command, initially proposed a limited operation after having taken heavy losses in the East Prussia offensive in 1914, the Lake Naroch offensive in early 1916, and the Brusilov offensive in the summer of 1916. These offensives were all started early at the request of the Western Allies, before the Russian Imperial Army was fully ready, to alleviate the pressure against France in the West. But when Germany and Austria-Hungary were advancing on the Eastern Front in mid-1915, France and Britain did relatively little to assist Russia, waiting for months before starting their own offensive and providing too few supplies to address the Russian Army's munition shortages. Therefore the Russian delegation to the conference instead proposed a Russian offensive from Romania that would invade Bulgaria from the north, and together with a pincer movement from the south by the Anglo-French army in Greece, remove Bulgaria from the war. This would also increase Russian influence in the Balkans and cut off the Ottoman Empire from the rest of the Central Powers.

Stavka's proposal was rejected by the Western Allies, which had already decided that Russia would launch an offensive in coordination with their efforts in the West, initially set for February 1917. But at a meeting of the Stavka on 30–31 December 1916 involving Emperor Nicholas II, who had assumed the post of Supreme Commander himself, the generals told him that the Russian Army would not be ready for an offensive by the requested date. On 1 February 1917, at a conference with French, British, and Italian delegations in Petrograd, it was agreed by Entente military leaders that an offensive in the West would start in April and the Russians would begin about one month later, giving them more time. The Petrograd conference also resulted in the Western Allies promising to provide Russia with supplies, including heavy artillery, aircraft, and railway rolling stock. On 6 February, Nicholas accepted the suggestion of his chief of staff, General Mikhail Alekseyev, that the offensive would be conducted by the Southwestern Front with the focus on capturing Lemberg and the region of Galicia. Their main opponent there would be the Austro-Hungarian Army, which still had not fully recovered from its losses in the Brusilov offensive the previous summer. These plans were concluded by the Stavka just before the outbreak of the February Revolution.

=== February Revolution ===
Protests and riots that broke out in Petrograd in March [O.S. February] 1917 caused a series of events that led to the abdication of Nicholas, becoming known as the February Revolution. Russia experienced a decline in grain production since the start of the war in 1914, which, combined with the demands of the army and problems with the rail system, caused shortages in Petrograd and other cities. Furthermore, the government's inability to finance the war effort led to a large deficit, which was partly covered by printing money, and the resulting inflation caused food prices to more than triple by the start of 1917. On 8 March [O.S. 23 February], women that worked in factories began marching on International Women's Day to demand bread. They were joined by male factory workers, and soon after that the crowds began also making political demands. The initial marches were endorsed by revolutionary workers' committees, who began organising more protests. As the protests became violent the emperor sent a telegram ordering the use of force to end the unrest. After police were attacked on 10 March, the Petrograd Military District commander, General Sergei Khabarov, gave soldiers permission to shoot at rioters. The next day, the troops killed people in the crowds, but several units refused to fire on protestors. Some of them joined the protests and over next two days the demonstrations grew beyond what the government could control, and they were also now armed with weapons from the rebellious soldiers. By 12 March the remaining police and loyal troops were overwhelmed and the Council of Ministers resigned as Petrograd was taken over by the uprising. Out of the protests emerged two new political forces that both met at the Tauride Palace: the Petrograd Soviet, a workers' and soldiers' council led by socialist parties, and a Provisional Government that was formed by the liberal parties of the State Duma. These two shared political authority in what became known as dual power.

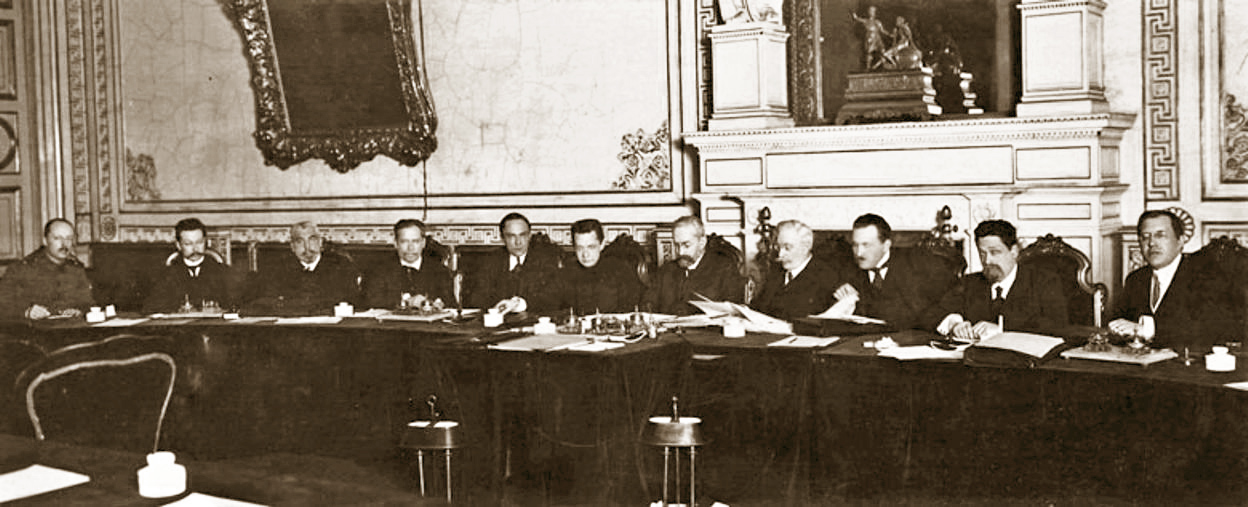
A Provisional Government meeting, March 1917

The Duma asked Nicholas to abdicate, but the most important factor in him making that decision was his chief of staff at the Stavka, General Alekseyev, who had the support of all of the senior army generals. Alekseyev, once he realised the liberal parties in the Duma would form a pro-war government, initially asked him to form a constitutional monarchy with the revolutionaries that could focus on restoring national unity and leading Russia to victory in the war. The main concern of the generals at the Stavka was the end the domestic unrest so that Russia could return to the war effort. After meeting with representatives of the Provisional Government, the generals persuaded Nicholas abdicate on 15 March [O.S. 2 March] 1917, which was demanded by the revolutionaries in Petrograd. Before he abdicated the emperor approved Prince Georgy Lvov to lead the Provisional Government, which consisted mostly of liberals and a few socialists, though it had no control over the revolutionary mobs in Petrograd without cooperation from the Soviet.

The leaders of the Provisional Government wanted to continue the war against the Central Powers alongside the Entente, and in April 1917 this led to a political crisis. The workers and soldiers in Petrograd wanted to end the war, though the Petrograd Soviet initially did not address the subject and focused on ending the monarchy. Whether or not the war should continue was not one of the main topics in Russian politics during the events of March 1917, but this changed by April, when the Soviet declared that it wanted peace "without annexations or reparations," but also stating that the revolution could not retreat in the face of foreign conquest. Lvov addressed this with a declaration stating that Russia was fighting the war to establish peace and self-determination for all nations. The Soviet's Executive Committee wanted the declaration to be sent to the other Allies, and when it was, Pavel Milyukov, the new government's minister of foreign affairs, added a private note which said that Russia still wanted to gain Constantinople and the Bosporus straits after the victory, as had been promised by the Entente earlier. This note was revealed to the public on 20 April 1917, and it caused large protests against the government. The more radical Bolshevik faction took advantage of the crisis to agitate for the overthrow of the Provisional Government, but the Soviet Executive Committee opposed this and worked to prevent another uprising. The April crisis led to the resignation of several ministers and a coalition agreement between Lvov and the Soviet, while Alexander Kerensky was appointed the Minister of War. Kerensky was among those who supported continuing the war and wanted to proceed with Russia's earlier agreement to go on the offensive.

== Prelude ==
=== Army democratisation ===
In the weeks after the tsar's abdication the Russian Army began experiencing a rapid decline in discipline and willingness to continue the war. The immediate effect of the loss of the monarchy and the weakness of the Provisional Government was to undermine the authority of the officer corps over the enlisted troops. The day before the abdication, the Petrograd Soviet issued its Order No. 1 to the troops, with the goal of preventing officers in Petrograd from using the garrison against the revolution and to make officers treat soldiers with more respect. But it eventually reached the soldiers at the front, and was interpreted by many soldiers to mean that they no longer had to obey their officers and could elect their own commanders. On 17 March 1917 the Soviet, together with the State Duma, tried to fix this situation by issuing Order No. 2, which stated that soldiers must still obey orders on military matters, but it was ineffective at restoring discipline. Although incidents of violence between soldiers and officers were not common, the officers now depended on the cooperation of the elected soldiers' committees. The committees were formed to manage the relationship between the officer corps and the enlisted troops, functioning as a soviet at the battalion level and higher, and tended to be dominated by praporshchiks (warrant officers) and NCOs. Members of the pre-war officer corps, who often were members of the nobility, looked at the soldiers' committees with contempt, while those who had been promoted into officer ranks or volunteered during the war were able to mediate between these two groups. The Stavka initially refused to cooperate with the committees, but front line officers did so because it was necessary.

The Russian officer corps itself was divided between pre-war career officers, student volunteers and reservists, and a large number of mobilised civilians who went through accelerated training. The pre-war officers included both aristocrats and peasants; the graduates of cadet corps and junker schools; guards and general staff officers and junior officers in the provinces. Each of the groups had their own views, and the conditions of war led to many officers being either weeded out or promoted. After the revolution, many regiment or division commanders were forced to step down because they were seen as counter-revolutionary and they left the front for their own safety, while those who remained pledged loyalty to the revolution and worked with the soldiers' committees to get things done. Officers had to show their enthusiasm for the revolutionary changes and use persuasion to convince soldiers to follow their orders. Those with a middle class professional or student background were most likely to sympathise with the revolution and work with the committees; they tended to support War Minister Kerensky, were pro-war and patriotic, and made preparations for the June offensive. The enlisted soldiers were mostly peasants, and they were patriotic but wanted to fight defensively and establish peace. Among the professional officers, some of them were monarchists (either constitutional or absolutist), while many welcomed the removal of Nicholas and supported the pro-war leaders of the Provisional Government.

After the February Revolution, the demoralization that affected the Petrograd garrison began spreading among units outside of the capital. Political agitators from outside the army travelled to the front to give speeches to the troops, which in some instances included trying to pit the soldiers against the officers. The Bolsheviks were among those who sent agitators, and used reserve units to spread their newspapers among the army. There were also reports of Russian soldiers talking and sharing food and alcohol with the Germans and Austro-Hungarians, who took the opportunity to spread propaganda among them after they became aware of the revolutionary developments in Russia. Almost every corps at the front line experienced refusal by some soldiers that were in reserve to move up to the front, though the vast majority of these situations were resolved by negotiation with the soldiers' committees and officers. There were some occasions in which officers were murdered by their troops, and these incidents happened most often in the reserve units further away from the front. Desertion from the front line slightly decreased after the Revolution, but became more common among the rear-echelon and reserve units. Part of the reason for this was that officers and soldiers with common experience at the front got along better, while the members of training or reserve units had less bonds between them.

=== Preparation ===
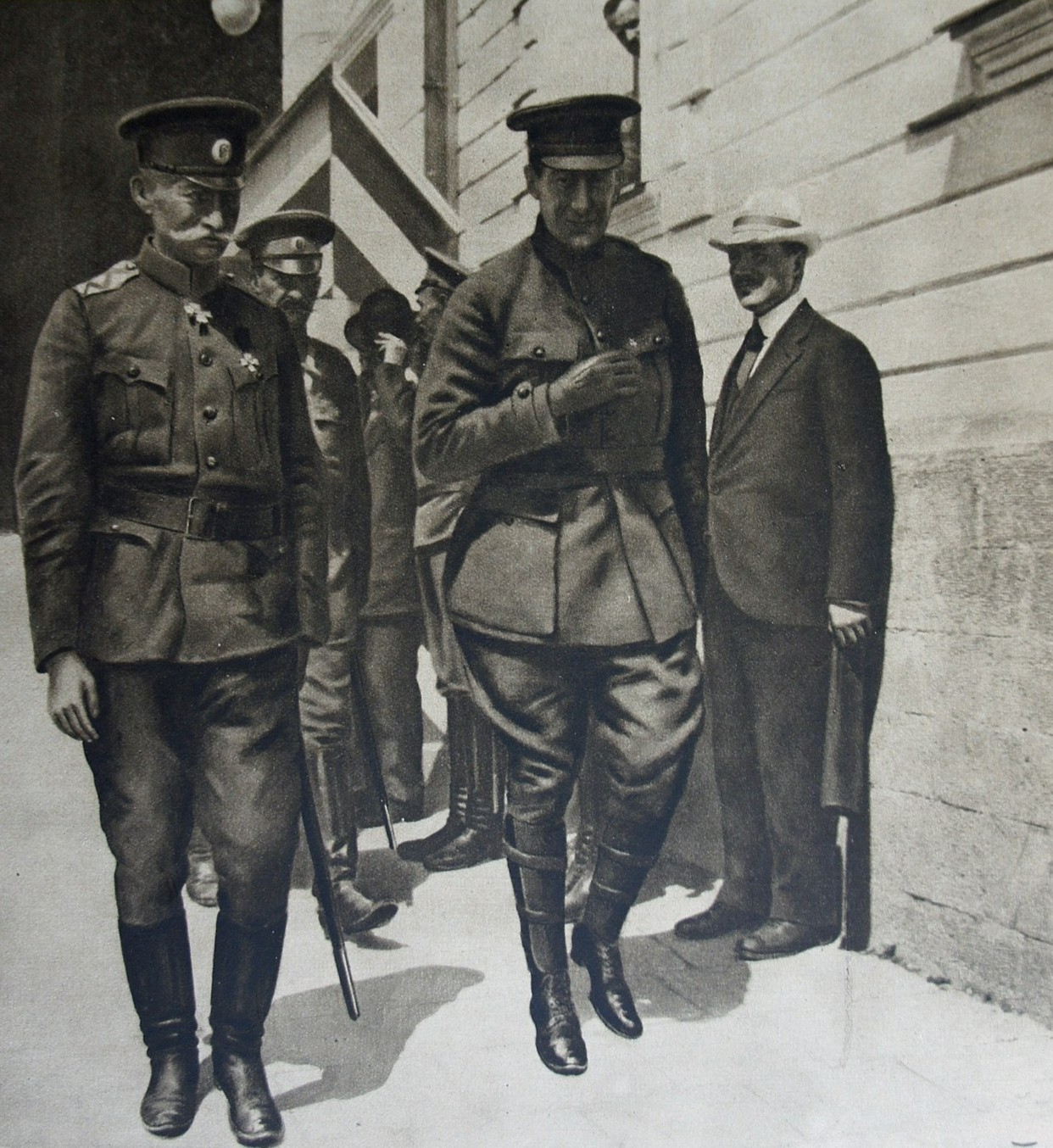
General Brusilov with War Minister Kerensky

Kerensky, as well as the Stavka and the Ministry of War, were determined to continue with the planned offensive in Galicia. In addition to their obligations to the Entente, they also thought it could restore national unity and military discipline. Despite its previous casualties, the Russian Army was still an effective force at the start of 1917. The Stavka estimated in April that the army had 7,060,700 soldiers, the largest army Russia ever fielded up to that point. Replacements for the losses of earlier years were being trained and many of its supply shortages had been resolved, in part because of more Allied assistance being shipped to the port of Arkhangelsk. However, the political developments of the Revolution and the creation of soldiers' committees undermined their plans for the offensive.

Alekseyev, who became the army supreme commander after the Revolution, told his French counterpart Robert Nivelle in March that the offensive would have to be delayed until June, because of low morale, logistical issues, and problems caused by bad weather. Alekseyev was also told by Alexander Guchkov, who was briefly the Minister of War before Kerensky replaced him, that the Petrograd Soviet had the real power and the Provisional Government existed as long as the Soviet allowed it. Therefore, Alekseyev had the French and Belgian representatives at the Stavka arranged for visits by socialists in their governments to get the Soviet to support continuing the war. The Soviet was divided on the issue, and avoided making a clear policy about the war until after the offensive happened.

Towards the end of March 1917, the commanders of Russia's three main army groups were ordered to give a report on the situation in their units. Generals Nikolai Ruzsky of the Northern Front and Vladimir Smirnov of the Western Front both answered that their troops were not in a condition to go on the attack, while General Aleksei Brusilov at the Southwestern Front was the only one who was optimistic and said that his armies were ready for an offensive. On 3 June, Alekseyev informed all front commanders that an offensive would be launched around 20 June, with a secondary attack by two armies of the Northern Front in the direction of Vilnius, but the main focus would be Galicia in the southwest.

In May 1917, Kerensky went on a tour of the front lines to give patriotic speeches to the troops, and during the tour he spent a lot of time together with Brusilov. The two of them got along well and agreed on many of the issues facing Russia at that time. They were also well received by the soldiers, and Kerensky's speeches helped raise enthusiasm for the offensive. At the same time, Alekseyev had been critical of Kerensky and the policies of the Provisional Government. On 4 June 1917 he was relieved of command and replaced by Brusilov as the head of the army. The replacement of Alekseyev was followed by Kerensky's appointment of other generals to senior posts, replacing those who were seen as "counter-revolutionary" with "democratic" generals that were willing to cooperate with soldiers' committees. Aleksei Gutor took the place of Brusilov at the head of the Southwestern Front, while Ivan Erdeli was appointed to command the 11th Army and Lavr Kornilov to command the 8th.

Kerensky's speaking tour, along with the work of the officers that cooperated with the soldiers' committees, was able to win over enough of the infantry units that were needed for the offensive. The lack of discipline was more common among the infantry, while the cavalry and artillery were often willing to put down mutinies by the former. In general, while the infantry soldiers were more divided, the Provisional Government still had significant support among the cavalry and artillery, the Cossacks, officer cadets, and volunteers of new infantry units called the "battalions of death," or shock battalions. One of the measures taken by Brusilov and the Provisional Government in the spring of 1917 to deal with the discipline problems was to create "volunteer, revolutionary battalions for the training of shock groups." Based on shock detachments formed by Brusilov in 1916 for infiltration and reconnaissance, they were expanded by him and by Kornilov in early 1917, which was eventually approved by Kerensky. Brusilov sent recruiters to places as far away as Petrograd and Moscow to find volunteers. These units were recruited from the best soldiers and officers of regular infantry regiments, as well as from civilian volunteers. But this also made the regular infantry less reliable. Between March and November 1917 there were 600,000 volunteers for the shock battalions. These included a Women's Battalion, which the Provisional Government also hoped to use to shame the infantry that did not want to fight.

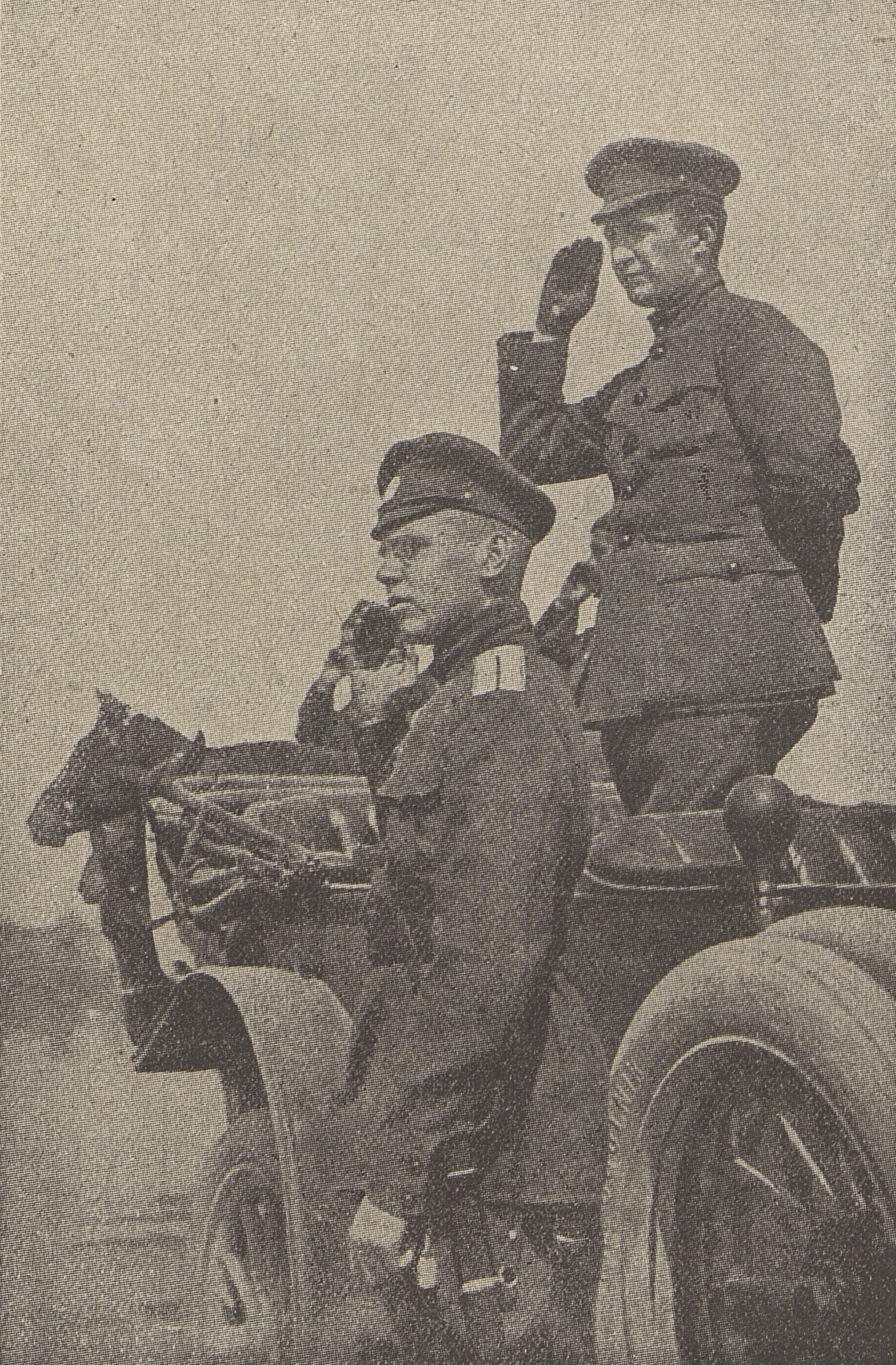
Kerensky touring the front lines

But in early May 1917, Brusilov told Alekseyev that the situation on the Southwestern Front had changed from his earlier report, and that logistical problems would make an offensive difficult. Later that month, at a conference of the Stavka, all front commanders reached the conclusion that an offensive was necessary to assist the Western Allies, despite all of the army's problems. France, Britain, and Italy pressured the Provisional Government to take offensive action, and according to foreign minister Mikhail Tereshchenko, they threatened to withhold loans that Russia needed to avoid bankruptcy if there was no Russian offensive. Kerensky also thought that a Russian military success would persuade the other Allies to seek peace on the terms in his government's earlier declaration calling for self-determination for all nations. So he saw Russian military action as an extension of his diplomacy to end the war on renegotiated terms. There was also the belief in the Provisional Government that if the army remained idle, it was more likely to disintegrate, and that it gave them an excuse to send the rebellious Petrograd garrison to the front line. The United States sent a delegation to Russia led by Elihu Root, who told Tereshchenko that the offensive should be postponed to give Russia time to recover from political unrest, and that Russia nominally being at war with Germany was enough assistance to the Allies, keeping German divisions on the Eastern Front. But the other countries had more influence in Russia than the U.S., and the delegation arrived when the decision had already been made.

In June, Kerensky made an effort to increase political backing for the offensive. To democratise the army as the Soviet wanted, he issued the declaration of soldiers' rights, which stated that soldiers could be members of political organizations and could express their opinions openly. But this meant that officers were prevented from stopping political agitation that spread anti-war sentiment among the troops. Kerensky obtained the support of the Petrograd Soviet, and the First All-Russian Congress of Soviets of Workers' and Soldiers' Deputies that convened in the second half of that month also voted in favour of a resolution that allowed him to go on the offensive. The Congress passed a ambiguously-worded resolution on 25 June 1917 stating that the army should be capable of both defensive and offensive operations, which was meant to be interpreted as an approval. Kerensky gave the order to the Stavka to begin the attack, in accordance with Alekseyev's plan that he had prepared for Nicholas. The stand of the Congress was clarified when the Petrograd Soviet's newspaper, Izvestia, called on soldiers to go on the offensive against the Central Powers to prevent the disintegration of the army, put Russia in a better negotiating position to end the war, and defend the territory of the country. The Bolsheviks voted against it during the Congress, along with some far-left deputies from the Mensheviks and the Socialist Revolutionaries, calling it part of an "imperialistic war."

The Germans were fully aware of the Russian offensive plan, from a combination of reports from deserters and aerial reconnaissance, and after defeating the French offensive in the West, the Army Supreme Command (OHL) sent six divisions from there to the Eastern Front. German quartermaster-general Erich Ludendorff intended to not only stop the Russian offensive, but to launch a counteroffensive into Russian territory. OHL's plan called for the capture of the Tarnopol–Czernovitz line, and Germany transferred six or seven infantry divisions, one cavalry division, and two artillery regiments from the Western Front to carry out the counterattack.

== Order of battle ==
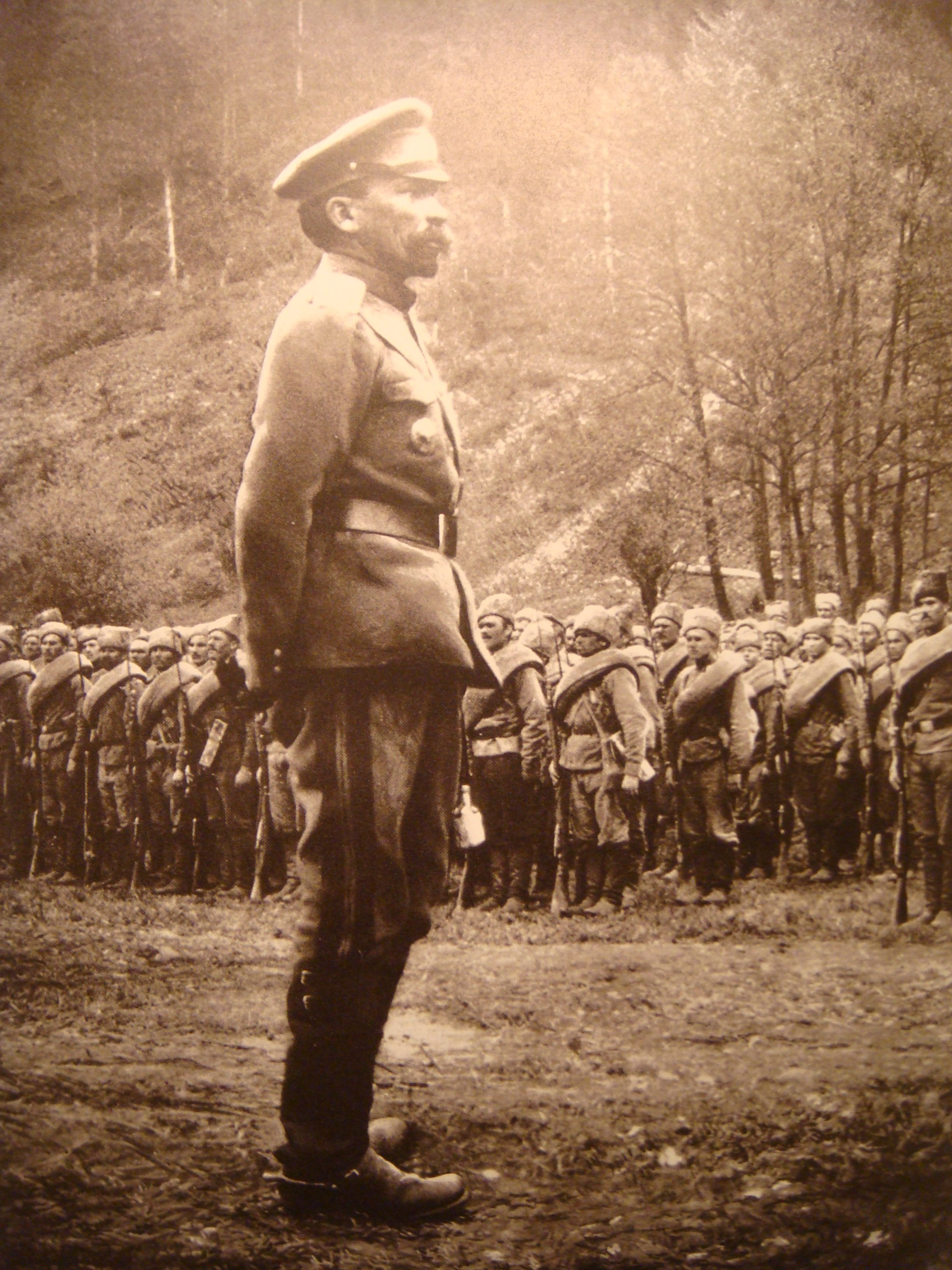
Lavr Kornilov with his troops in 1917

=== Russian ===
Armies from north to south:

- Southwestern Front (Gen. Aleksei Gutor)
  - 11th Army (Gen. Ivan Erdeli)
    - 17th Army Corps
    - 49th Army Corps
    - 6th Army Corps
    - 1st Guards Corps
  - 7th Army (Gen. Leonid Belkovich)
    - 41st Army Corps
    - 7th Siberian Army Corps
    - 34th Army Corps
    - 22nd Finnish Army Corps
    - 2nd Guards Corps
    - 2nd Cavalry Corps
    - 5th Cavalry Corps
  - 8th Army (Gen. Lavr Kornilov)
    - 12th Army Corps
    - 14th Army Corps

The Special Army was also part of the Southwestern Front, but did not participate in the offensive.

=== Central Powers ===
Armies from north to south:

- Army Group Böhm-Ermolli (Col. Gen. Eduard von Böhm-Ermolli)
  - 2nd Army (Col. Gen. Eduard von Böhm-Ermolli)
    - XI Corps
    - V Corps
    - XVIII Corps
  - South Army (Gen. Felix Graf von Bothmer)
    - German XVII Reserve Corps
    - German XXV Reserve Corps
    - Ottoman XV Corps
    - Austro-Hungarian XXV Corps
  - 3rd Army (Gen. Karl Tersztyánszky von Nádas; later Gen. Karl Křitek)
    - XIII Corps
    - XXVI Corps

== Offensive ==
=== Initial advance ===
Map of the offensive and Central Powers counteroffensive

The preliminary artillery barrage began on 29 June [O.S. 16 June] 1917, when Kerensky arrived in Tarnopol and officially ordered the offensive. The Russian objective was to capture the city of Lemberg (Lvov) while advancing from two directions: the 11th Army from the north, aiming to capture Zolochev before advancing southwards toward Lemberg, and the 7th Army from the south, to capture the Berezhany railway junction before continuing north to the main target. Further to the south was this theatre, the 8th Army was tasked with a supporting attack on the towns of Kalush and Galich, and the railways in that area. Opposite of the 11th Army was the Austro-Hungarian 2nd Army, and opposite of the 7th Army was the German commanded South Army, the latter including German, Austro-Hungarian, and Ottoman divisions. The 8th Army was faced by the Austro-Hungarian 3rd Army.

On 1 July [O.S. 18 June], the 7th and 11th Armies commenced their attack. Their shock battalions breached the defences for several miles along the Zborov–Berezhany sector, and by 2 July had taken several lines of trenches. The 11th Army had pushed back the Austro-Hungarian 2nd, and advanced an average of 2 miles (3.2 km) into their territory along the front, but the 7th Army further to the south had a much slower advance, primarily facing the German troops of the South Army. The Russian attack on the first day captured over 18,000 men. After the first two days of fighting the 7th Army took about 15,000 casualties and inflicted about 12,500 on the opposing German-Austro-Hungarian-Ottoman force, which challenged them for control of the heights of the Zolota Lypa river valley. By the evening of the second day the troops of the 7th Army were no longer willing to go on the attack. The 7th Army's advance stopped after 2 July and it was ordered to simply cover the flank of the Eleventh.

The 11th Army had more initial success, capturing its objectives, and so did the Czech volunteer units. The opposing Austro-Hungarian force was reduced took heavy losses and many of them abandoned their positions during the Russian attack. The 11th Army took a significant number of prisoners, and the German reserve forces that were meant for a counterattack against the Russians were used to stop the breakthrough in the Austro-Hungarian line. The Battle of Zborov in the 11th Army's sector became notable for the advance of the Czechoslovak Brigades against the Austro-Hungarian 19th Infantry Division, which mostly consisted of ethnic Czechs. The successful Czechoslovak attack caused the division to withdraw from the town, and, together with Russian assistance, threatened a breakthrough on this part of the front before reinforcements were used to strengthen that area. Although it was a small battle, it became well known in Czech and Slovak history, as part of their independence struggle from the Habsburg monarchy.

After the first couple of days, the shock troops that had been chosen to lead the attack had been weakened, and the regular infantry were not as reliable. There was a break in major fighting for three days, but it resumed on 6 July near Koniukhy, though by this time German reinforcements had reached the area. There were heavy losses for the 11th Army, and its advance was halted. After the initial advance, many soldiers believed they had done their job and did not want to continue. The 11th Army's reserve, the 1st Guards Corps, went on the attack, with the Moskovsky, Egersky, and Finlandsky regiments leading the way while the Preobrazhensky, Semyonovsky and Pavlovsky Regiments backed them up. The artillery barrage ahead of their attack never occurred, leaving the fortifications of the defenders intact, and the guards units were quickly pushed back with heavy losses. Demoralization spread among the guards, and the corps commander Vladimir May-Mayevsky's order to arrest Bolshevik agitators caused chaos in their units. Reinforcements that arrived from Petrograd also spread Bolshevik propaganda among the soldiers. The fighting on 6 July marked the end of the offensive for the 11th Army, at which point its troops stayed in the positions they had gained, an advance of five kilometres. Other units in the rear that were less enthusiastic about the offensive had been kept in reserve and were unwilling to assist the front line units.

=== Kornilov's attack ===
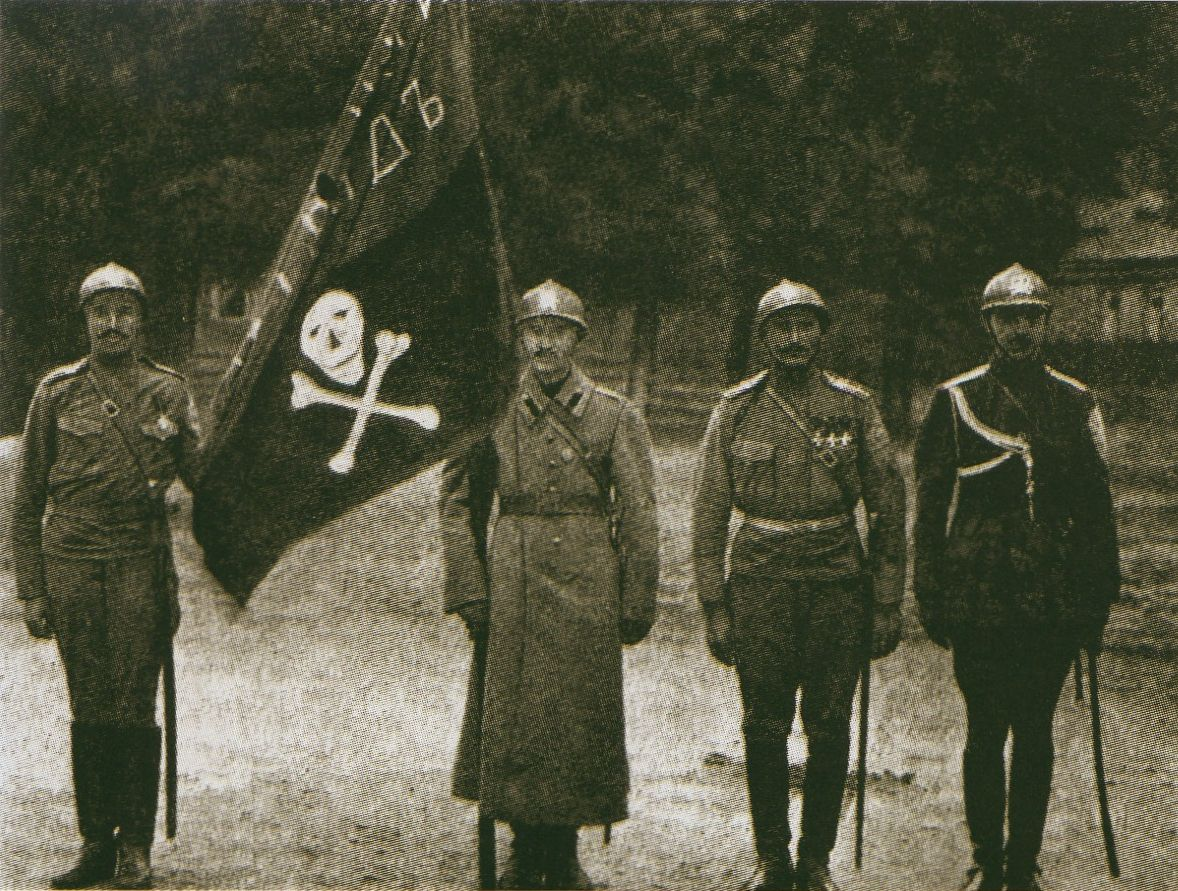
Shock battalion members from the Kornilov Shock Unit

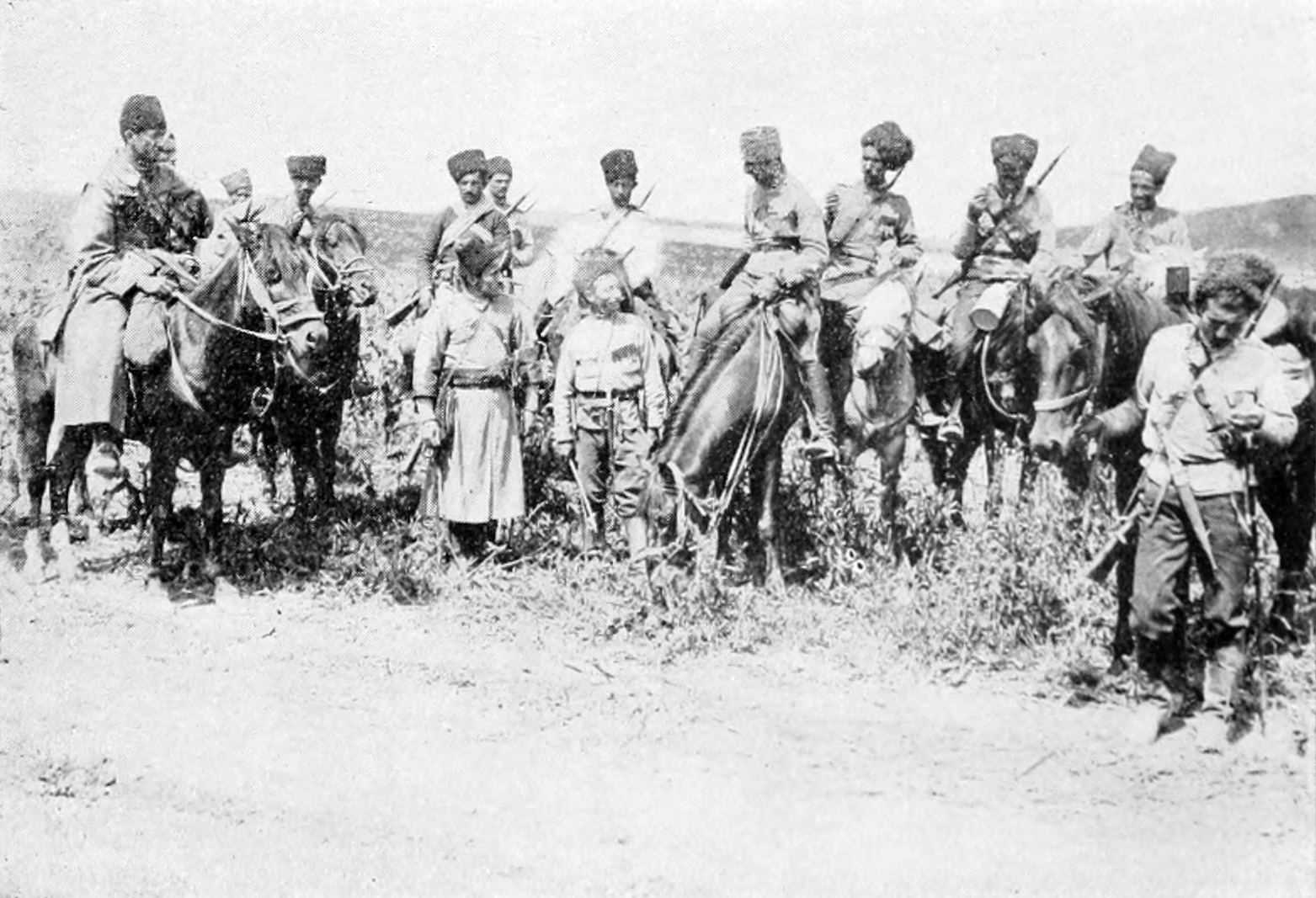
Reconnaissance unit of the Caucasian Native Cavalry Division

Kornilov's Russian 8th Army was supposed to have a secondary role in the main offensive, but after the failure of the 7th and 11th Armies, it went on the attack and broke through the Austro-Hungarian lines to capture several towns, which was celebrated in the Russian press. Kornilov's attack made it as far as thirty kilometres and his troops had relatively less problems with indiscipline, in part because he had formed committees of agitators that persuaded units to go on the attack.

Around the time the attack in the north slowed down, on 6 July, the 8th Army began shelling the Austro-Hungarian positions in their sector near Stanislau. The Russians had a geographic advantage, with their positions being higher up than the Austro-Hungarians, who had also not completed their defences in this area. The 8th Army then launched its own attack against Austro-Hungarian 3rd Army, led by Karl Tersztyánszky von Nádas, but it failed to break through on 7 July. The initial infantry attack at several locations did not make much progress, but two days of an artillery barrage weakened the Austro-Hungarian defences, and a renewed assault led to the capture of Stanislau on 8 July. The defences beyond the city, along the road from Stanislau to the Russian objective of Kalush, had not been prepared by Nádas or other senior officers. The Austro-Hungarian positions here collapsed and Kornilov's troops advanced 6 miles (9.7 km) toward Kalush. Kornilov's success was more than taking territory, as the German high command had to delay their plans for their own counteroffensive in the South Army's sector to the north. Instead, the divisions they intended to use for that were diverted to shore up the Austro-Hungarian 3rd Army. The fighting paused on 10 July as the Russians brought more ammunition and artillery to their new positions, but Nádas was relieved of command by Karl Křitek.

Brusilov, the front commander, asked Kornilov to provide assistance to the 7th and 11th Armies, but he was focused on the capture of Lemberg (Lvov). Kornilov also requested reinforcements, but received units from the 7th Army that had experienced Bolshevik agitation and were unwilling to fight. When some of these soldiers tried to retreat from the battle, Kornilov had a machine gun and artillery unit stop them by shooting at them.

The advance of the 8th Army resumed late on 10 July, and they captured Galich, a bridgehead on the Dniester river, and the following day Kalush, the headquarters of the 3rd Army. Kornilov's men had advanced 15–20 miles (24–32 km) and captured 10,000 troops. However, the Russian advance was halted, including by a German reinforcements to strengthen the Austro-Hungarians and by problems caused by bad weather in the area of the Lomnitsa river that destroyed the bridges they had built. This marked the end of the 8th Army's advance, which had been the most successful, and on 20 July Kornilov, to whom the success was attributed, was named the commander of the Southwestern Front in the place of General Aleksei Gutor. His promotion was requested to Kerensky by Boris Savinkov, a Provisional Government commissar to the Southwestern Front, who believed the Kornilov could restore the power of the army and save Russia. Kerensky approved this request, and it was accepted by the supreme commander, Brusilov.

=== German counteroffensive ===
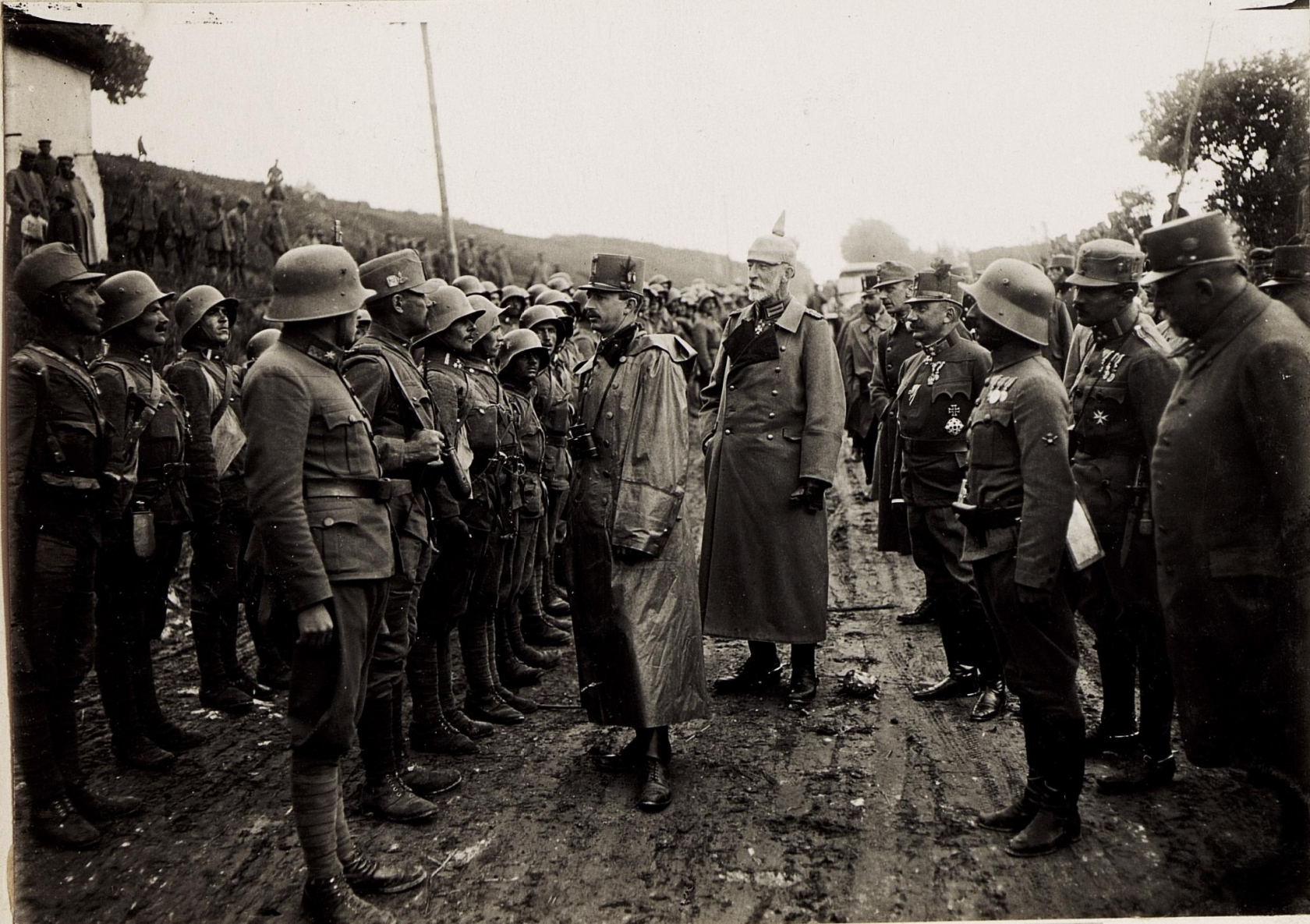
Austro-Hungarian emperor Charles I speaks to the troops during the counteroffensive, with Felix Graf von Bothmer (right of the emperor)

The Germans launched their counteroffensive against the Southwestern Front on 19 July. The initial attack fell on the 11th Army, which began retreating despite its numerical superiority over the German force. The most reliable units had suffered the majority of the casualties, and the ones that were left were unwilling to fight. By the end of 21 July, the 11th Army had abandoned its positions, and on 22 July the 7th Army was also hit by the German counterattack. The Russian 7th and 11th Armies were in full retreat, which turned into a rout, while the remaining resistance there to the Germans came from officers and NCOs. By 23 July, the 8th Army was forced to withdraw because its flank was exposed.

Despite this, not a single Russian division was encircled and destroyed, and many of the deserters in the rear of the front line returned to their units or were caught. The German and Austro-Hungarian forces used up large quantities of ammunition and overstretched their forces. In some areas, such as along Zbruch river, Russian troops started putting up a stronger resistance as they were now fighting within Russian territory. Among the guards units, the Preobrazhensky and Semyonovsky Regiments notably put up a fight during the Russian retreat. After only encountering limited Russian resistance, Austro-German troops took the city of Tarnopol on 25 July as the 7th and parts of the 11th Armies withdrew to the other side of the Zbruch river. A Russian attack was launched on 31 July against the Austro-Hungarians but it was fought off. Czernovitz, the other German objective, fell on 3 August. The fighting was largely over after 5 August 1917. The Russian Provisional Government recognised the loyal units that distinguished themselves during the counteroffensive, including the Preobrazhensky and Semyonovsky Guards Regiments, the Polish Uhlan Regiment, and the 194th Infantry Division.

By the time the German counteroffensive was finished the Russian army had fallen back to the original Austro-Hungarian-Russian border, having retreated by as much as 120 kilometres (75 miles). Most of the Austro-Hungarian provinces of Galicia and Bukovina were retaken by the Austro-German forces.

=== Supporting operations in the north ===
On other parts of the Russian front, the supporting attacks by the other army groups fared worse. The Western Front, led by Anton Denikin, started the offensive on 20 July with the 10th Army attacking in the direction of Smorgon and Krevo, but they were stopped by German reinforcements, and many of the larger units refused to fight or began disintegrating. Out of all of the forces during the Kerensky offensive the 10th Army had the least success. Many of its soldiers were demoralised, despite a lack of widespread Bolshevik agitation there.

The Northern Front attacked towards Vilnius on 21 July with the 5th Army, but only two of its six divisions were willing to attack, while the 12th Army refused to advance at all. Two divisions of the 5th Army, the 18th and 70th, were able to take some of the German trenches in front of them, mainly with the use of officers, shock battalions, and other loyal units, but the attack was cancelled as the bulk of the troops remained in their own trenches and were unwilling to provide support. Mutinies also broke out, and after the failed advance the 5th Army was faced with the task of restoring order.

=== Romanian campaign ===
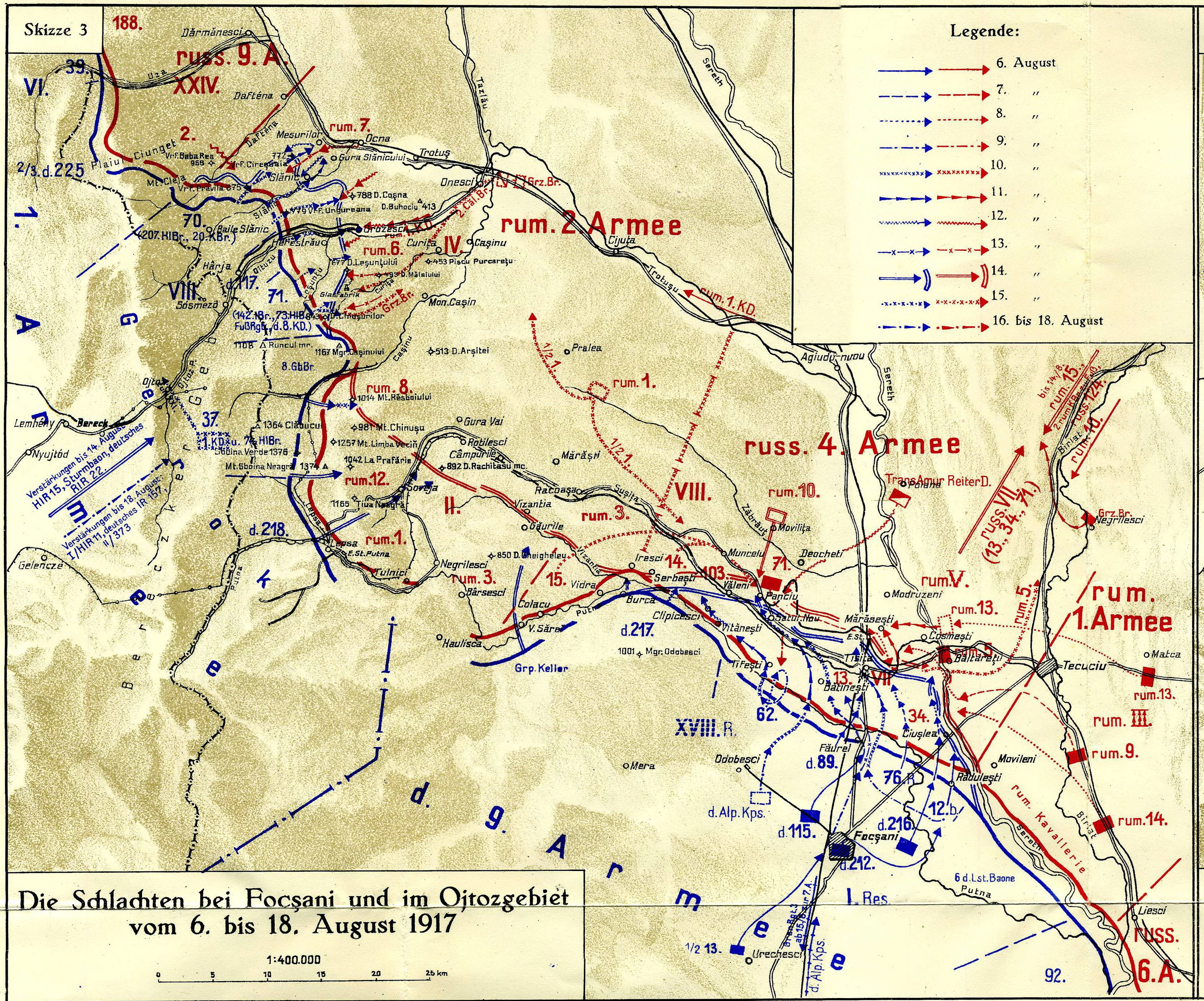
Map of the opposing forces, August 1917

The Stavka originally planned for Russia's ally Romania to have a small contribution to the main offensive, seeing the Romanians as a liability, but the Romanian leadership was intent on liberating their homeland and proposed a much larger operation, which was approved in late March 1917 by a new Russian government that was faced with rapidly declining discipline among its own troops. The Romanian Army was in the process of rebuilding after Romania's near collapse in the previous year, so the Stavka planned for them and the armies of Russia's Romanian Front to be the last to start their advance.

The Romanian First Army was tasked with the main attack against the German 9th Army bridgehead on the Siret river at Nămoloasa while the Romanian Second Army would launch a secondary attack against the Austro-Hungarian 1st Army in the upper Putna valley. The three Russian armies (the 4th, 6th, and 9th) had a supporting role to the Romanians. Romanian morale was high, but it was much lower for the Russian units. Because of that, and the defeat of the main offensive in Galicia, there were proposals to cancel the operation (planned for 24 July), but it went ahead at the insistence of King Ferdinand of Romania, General Constantin Prezan, and the king's Russian chief of staff, Dmitry Shcherbachev. The main advance on Nămoloasa was permanently delayed, but the Russo-Romanian actions at the Battles of Mărăști, Mărășești, and Oituz were successful in retaking some territory from the Austro-Hungarians and Germans, and prevented the Central Powers from conquering what was left of Romania. The campaign also restored Romania's credibility among the Entente after the defeat in 1916, but overall it was a small victory for the war effort.

It became the most successful supporting operation for the Kerensky offensive. The effect of seeing the Romanian Army advance and the use of shock units to stop mutinies behind the front line contributed to the willingness of Russian soldiers to fight in this area, despite the presence of the same discipline problems that affected the rest of the Russian Army. The fighting in Romania continued until mid-September 1917.

== Aftermath ==
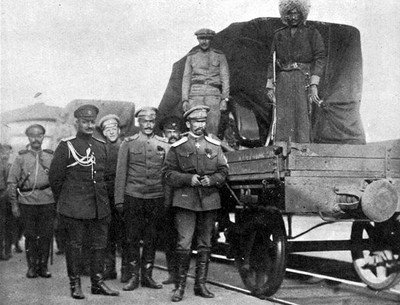
Supreme commander Kornilov (centre) in Moscow for the State Conference, August 1917. The 8th Army's initial success in the offensive began Kornilov's rise

As many Russian units disintegrated during the retreat, some soldiers committed crimes against the local population in the area near the front, causing Kornilov and Savinkov to ask the Provisional Government to restore the death penalty in the army. At a meeting of senior commanders at the Stavka on 29 July 1917, Kerensky was criticised for all of the policies that the Provisional Government implemented in the army since the February Revolution, and he agreed on the necessity of restoring order among the troops. On 31 July, he appointed Kornilov to replace Brusilov as the Supreme Commander, because Kornilov had always opposed the revolutionary changes. Kornilov was also recommended to Kerensky by Boris Savinkov. Furthermore, Kerensky approved their request to restore the death penalty, to impose limitations on soldiers' committees, and effectively cancel his Declaration of Soldiers' Rights from earlier. In this he was supported by the Petrograd Soviet Executive Committee, which declared that those who disobeyed orders from the Provisional Government were "traitors and cowards." Ordinary soldiers saw this as the leadership siding with the counter-revolutionary officers against them, and they started becoming disillusioned with both the Provisional Government and the moderate members of the Soviet.

In the immediate term, as the Russian army retreated back into the Russian Empire, the soldiers became more willing to fight. The new measures to restore discipline also had an effect, though the events of the retreat itself were the main reason for the change in attitude. Patriotism re-emerged when the army was defending Russia, but the overall revolutionary views of the soldiers remained. The Austro-German forces retook most of the Austro-Hungarian provinces of Galicia and Bukovina, reversing the gains of the 1916 Brusilov offensive and taking additional territory. They stopped their attack when their forces had gone beyond the capacity of their railways to provide support. Before the German counteroffensive in Galicia was over, the high command began planning an offensive further north to capture Riga, a city not very far from the Russian capital Saint Petersburg.

The month of July also saw a series of protests in Petrograd known as the July Days. The possibility of being sent to the front for the summer offensive, and therefore removed from the centre of power, caused the revolutionary soldiers of the Petrograd garrison to stage protests against the government. The arrival in Petrograd of rebellious troops and deserters from other fronts caused agitation, as they advocated for all power to be given to the Soviet. Initially they were peaceful, and both the Soviet and Bolshevik Party leaders talked the radicals out of staging a coup against the Provisional Government. Vladimir Lenin thought that the government still had significant support and an early uprising could be crushed. However, the Bolshevik organization in Petrograd was taken over by the radicals. On 16 July, some of the troops started a violent protest against the offensive and the government, calling on workers to join them. Within days, they brought the city to a standstill. The rioters surrounded the Tauride Palace, but the leaders of the Soviet refused their demands, while Lenin and other Bolshevik leaders were reluctant to get involved. Regardless, the Bolsheviks were accused of being the instigators and had to flee the capital when the Provisional Government brought loyal troops into the city to end the protests. Also, on 7 July, Kerensky became the head of government when Prince Georgy Lvov resigned, which was unrelated to either the offensive or the July Days, but had to do with several ministers resigning in protest of the government's decision to grant autonomy to Ukraine.

The offensive also began Kornilov's rise to power, as he had been its most effective commander and managed to stabilise the front after the rout of the other two armies. He attended the Moscow State Conference in mid-August 1917, where he received the support of right-wing industrialists and politicians that were secretly wanted to remove the Provisional Government from power. Kornilov and some other generals at the Stavka used loyal units to try to remove the Soviet from Petrograd, but this backfired when the troops mostly refused to comply. On 14 September 1917, Kornilov and the other rebel generals were placed under arrest. The crisis led the Soviet to ask the Bolsheviks for help, releasing their leaders that had been imprisoned after the July Days, and arming 25,000 Bolshevik Red Guards. They also invited radical Baltic Fleet sailors into Petrograd for security. The soldiers distrusted Kerensky because of his lenient treatment of Kornilov and his conspirators, and many of the troops refused to take orders from the high command, which could now only rely on a few reliable units. The Bolsheviks took this opportunity to spread within army units all across the front line, whereas before their influence had been mostly limited to the Northern Front near the capital, and to obtain the majority of seats in the Petrograd Soviet, shortly before the October Revolution. The Kerensky offensive led to the Kornilov crisis, which itself greatly contributed to the Bolsheviks overthrowing the Provisional Government on 7 November [O.S. 25 October] 1917.

== Bibliography ==
- Beevor, Antony (2022). Russia: Revolution and Civil War, 1917–1921. Penguin. ISBN 978-0-593-49388-5.
- Bilton, David (2014). The Central Powers on the Russian Front 1914–1918. Barnsley: Pen and Sword. ISBN 978-1-78340-053-9.
- Buttar, Prit (2017). The Splintered Empires: The Eastern Front 1916–17. Oxford: Osprey Publishing. ISBN 978-1-4728-1986-4.
- Cockfield, Jamie H. (2019). Russia's Iron General: The Life of Aleksei A. Brusilov, 1853–1926. Lanham: Lexington Books. ISBN 978-1-4985-7252-1.
- Feldman, Robert S. (1968). "The Russian General Staff and the June 1917 Offensive". Soviet Studies. 19 (4): 526–543. JSTOR 149747.
- Ferro, Marc (1971). "The Russian Soldier in 1917: Undisciplined, Patriotic, and Revolutionary". Slavic Review. 30 (3): 483–512. doi:10.2307/2493539. JSTOR 2493539.
- Golovin, Nikolai (2014). Россия в Первой мировой войне [Russia in First World War] (in Russian). Вече. ISBN 978-5-4444-1667-9.
- Heenan, Louise Erwin (1987). Russian Democracy's Fatal Blunder: The Summer Offensive of 1917. New York: Praeger. ISBN 978-0-275-92829-2.
- Katkov, George (1980). Russia 1917: The Kornilov Affair. London; New York: Longman. ISBN 978-0-582-49101-4.
- Kenez, Peter (1971). Civil War in South Russia, 1918: The First Year of the Volunteer Army. University of California Press. ISBN 978-0-520-31226-5.
- Oleynikov, Alexei (2016). Россия–щит Антанты [Russia–Shield of the Entente] (in Russian). Foreword by Nikolai Starikov. St. Petersburg: Piter. ISBN 978-5-496-01795-4.
- Reese, Roger R. (2019). The Imperial Russian Army in Peace, War, and Revolution, 1856–1917. Lawrence: University Press of Kansas. ISBN 978-0-7006-2860-5.
- Stevenson, David (2017). 1917: War, Peace, and Revolution. Oxford: Oxford University Press. ISBN 978-0-19-100676-0.
- Torrey, Glenn E. (2011). The Romanian Battlefront in World War I. Lawrence: University of Kansas Press. ISBN 978-0-7006-2017-3.
- Tunstall, Graydon A. (2021). The Austro-Hungarian Army and the First World War. Cambridge: Cambridge University Press. ISBN 978-0-521-19934-6.
- Wildman, Allan (1992). "Officers of the General Staff and the Kornilov Movement". In Edith Rogovin Frankel; Jonathan Frankel; Baruch Knei-Paz (eds.). Revolution in Russia: Reassessments of 1917. Cambridge: Cambridge University Press. ISBN 978-0-521-40585-0.
- Wildman, Allan (1987). The End of the Russian Imperial Army: The Road to Soviet Power and Peace. Vol. II. Princeton: Princeton University Press. ISBN 0-691-05504-1.
