= 3rd Army (Austria-Hungary) =

Field army of Austria-Hungary during World War I

3. Armee; 3rd Army
- Active: August 1914 – January 1918
- Country: Austria-Hungary
- Type: Army
- Role: Artillery observer Charge; Cold-weather warfare Combined arms Conventional warfare Counter-battery fire Indirect fire Military communications Military engineering Military logistics Offensive; Raiding; Reconnaissance; Trench warfare
- Size: Field army
- Engagements: World War I; Battle of Gnila Lipa; Battle of the Vistula River; Battle of Limanowa; Battle of the Carpathian Mountains; Gorlice–Tarnów Offensive; Great Retreat; Second invasion of Serbia; Montenegrin Campaign; Battle of Asiago; Kerensky Offensive

Commanders
- Notable commanders: Rudolf von Brudermann

The 3rd Army (German: k.u.k. 3. Armee) was a field army level command within the Austro-Hungarian Army of Austria-Hungary during World War I. It was primarily active on the Eastern Front against the Russian Empire and in the Balkans against Serbia and Montenegro. Later on, the 3rd Army took part in some fighting on the Italian Front before returning to the eastern theater by 1917 to repulse the Kerensky Offensive. Its remaining units were merged with the 7th Army in January 1918.

== History ==
=== 1914 ===
The 3rd Army was formed in August 1914 as part of Austria-Hungary's mobilization following its declaration of war on Serbia and Russia, carrying out the prewar plans for the formation of six field armies. Just as all Austro-Hungarian field armies, it consisted of a headquarters and several corps, along with some unattached units. The 3rd Army initially consisted of the XI and XIV Corps, based in Lemberg (modern day Lviv, Ukraine), and Innsbruck, respectively. In addition there were several divisions that were attached directly to army headquarters. It was placed under the overall command of General der Kavallerie Rudolf Ritter von Brudermann. Early on in the war the formation took part in the Battle of Galicia in the northeastern part of the Dual Monarchy, where it was part of the Austro-Hungarian force advancing from Lemberg towards the Russian Southwestern Front's positions. On 25 August 1914, they received word of advancing Russian forces near Zlota Lipa river and 3rd Army was ordered to engage them. The clash began on August 26, with what the Austrians believed were small Russian units, but turned out to be eight corps. It was not long before they were forced to retreat, reaching Lemberg on August 27. Although 3rd Army had the time to form a defensive line near the Gnila Lipa river, the advancing Russians outnumbered Bruderman's army three to one and drove them back on August 30, before seizing Lemberg itself in early September. Thus the Austro-Hungarian line had to retreat back to the Carpathians, losing the country's territory east of the mountain range to the Russians.

In September 1914, in the aftermath of the defense of Galicia, Bruderman had been replaced as the army commander by Svetozar Boroević von Bojna. Under his command the 3rd Army spent the remaining winter months of that year defending important mountain passes throughout the Carpathians.

=== 1915 ===
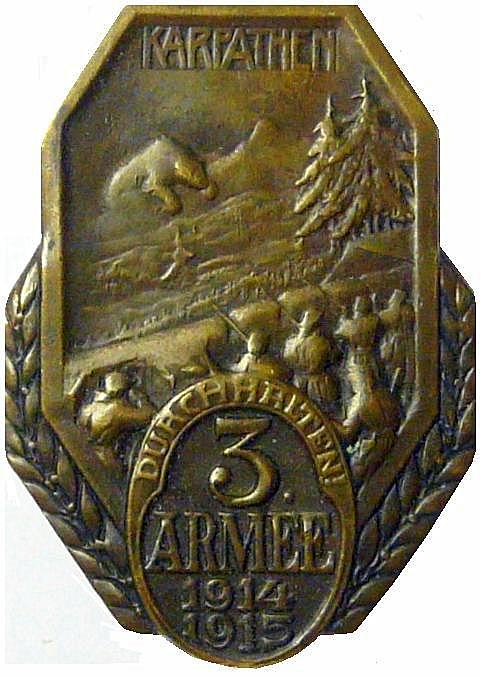
Cap badge for 3rd Army soldiers, depicting their offensive in the Carpathians

The 3rd Army, with support of the German South Army, spearheaded the offensive against Russian positions in the Carpathian Mountains in January 1915 in an attempt to reverse the losses during last year's Galicia debacle. By then it had been built up to include fifteen infantry and four and a half cavalry divisions for the assault, which began on January 23 with the goal of securing the rail and communications hubs of Medzilaborce, Sambir, and Sanok. Despite some early successes against numerically inferior enemy units which allowed them to advance about 38 kilometers, the Habsburg troops suffered from a lack of reinforcements and logistical problems. The mountain winter weather also turned for the worse as the overstretched 3rd Army had to defend its line from Russian counteroffensives, as it occupied a large gap between two important passes on January 26. By early February, the Austro-Hungarian offensive had stalled without reaching the besieged Przemyśl fortress, and the Russians remained in control of the strategically important passes while 3rd Army divisions had been reduced to the size of brigades and lower. Thus it ended up losing its numerical advantage. By mid-February the Russian army had regained the initiative while the Austro-Hungarian troop strength had been badly depleted. The remaining men of 3rd Army were subjected to below freezing temperatures and other environmental dangers, lack of supplies, and no possibility of relief. By late February, it lost around 88,000 men—about 75% of its initial strength—and had to finally be reinforced by the newly-formed 2nd Army.

After the fighting in the Carpathians, the 3rd Army was assigned to take part in the Gorlice–Tarnów Offensive in southern Poland and Galicia. It was entrusted with seizing Przemyśl fortress as in the failed offensive earlier in 1915. The 3rd and 4th armies ended up retaking the Carpathian passes and took the fortifications outside of Przemyśl in the early days of June, with the fortress itself finally being retaken on 3 June 1915. The 3rd Army was briefly disbanded as its component units were broken up to reinforce other formations. Afterwards, from June until September, the formation was temporarily deactivated.

The 3rd Army was reactivated in early October 1915 for the second invasion of Serbia, as part of Army Group Mackensen, this time under the command of Hermann Kövess von Kövessháza. This army group crossed the Sava–Danube line into Serbia on October 5. The Habsburg troops, along with the Bulgarian forces of the 1st Army, were tasked with driving the main Serbian force into the awaiting German 11th Army. However, Field Marshal Radomir Putnik met the attacking forces while executing a series of retreats that kept most of his strength intact. August von Mackensen's 11th Army entered Belgrade on October 9, while Kövess's 3rd Army pursued the retreating Serbs. The campaign resulted in about 18,000 Habsburg casualties. The Serbs entered Montenegro in an attempt to reach Allied ships on the coast, and Austro-Hungarian supreme commander Franz Conrad von Hötzendorf gave the 3rd Army orders to not stop and to invade the small country as well. Their forces occupied Cetinje, the capital, on 13 January 1916.

=== 1916–18 ===
In mid-1916, the 3rd Army was redeployed to the Italian Front, where it was part of Army Group Archduke Eugen (commanded by Archduke Eugen of Austria), once again led by von Kövess. In the spring of that year, Hötzendorf decided to attempt an offensive in a part of the front away from the Isonzo river area where the main fighting had been occurring. It saw action against the Italians in the Battle of Asiago alongside the 11th Army, which began on 15 May 1916. The assault was initially very successful, pushing 8 kilometers on a front 70 kilometers in length, and then another 10 kilometers before reaching Asiago. However, the Brusilov Offensive in the east forced the Habsburg army command to withdraw some units there, and thus Archduke Eugen's force retreated just 5 kilometers ahead of where they had begun. In total the 3rd and 11th armies had taken some 150,000 casualties.

During the Kerensky Offensive of 1917, the 3rd Army fought under Generaloberst Karl Tersztyánszky von Nádas against the 8th Army of General Lavr Kornilov. Clashing with the 8th Army at Stanislau (modern day Ivano-Frankivsk, Ukraine), the 3rd Army drove back Kornilov's forces. The formation's remaining units were merged with the 7th Army in January 1918.

== Order of battle in August 1914 ==
Upon mobilization at the outbreak of war the 3rd Army consisted of the following units.

Organization of 3rd Army in August 1914
| Army | Corps | Division |
|---|---|---|
| 3rd Army | XI Corps | 30th Infantry Division |
| 3rd Army | XIV Corps | 3rd Infantry Division |
| 3rd Army | XIV Corps | 8th Infantry Division |
| 3rd Army | XIV Corps | 44th Landwehr Infantry Division |
| 3rd Army | (Subordinated to HQ) | 41st Honvéd Infantry Division |
| 3rd Army | (Subordinated to HQ) | 23rd Honvéd Infantry Division |
| 3rd Army | (Subordinated to HQ) | 4th Cavalry Division |
| 3rd Army | (Subordinated to HQ) | 2nd Cavalry Division |
| 3rd Army | (Subordinated to HQ) | 11th Honved Cavalry Division |

== Order of battle in 1914–15 ==
The following units were assigned to 3rd Army during the time of the Carpathian and Gorlice-Tarnów operations.

- Assigned in August 1914:
  - II Corps (until May 1915)
  - IX Corps (until January 1915)
- Assigned in November and December 1914:
  - Corps "Szurmay" (until February 1915)
  - XVIII Corps (until February 1915)
- Assigned in January 1915:
  - V Corps (until February 1915)
  - VII Corps (until May 1915)
  - X Corps (until June 1915)
  - XIX Corps (until February 1915)
- Assigned in February 1915:
  - XVII Corps (until June 1915)

== Order of battle after Gorlice–Tarnów ==
The following units were assigned to 3rd Army in the period between mid-1915 and the end of the war in 1918.

- Assigned in October 1915:
  - VIII Corps (until March 1916)
  - XII Corps (until June 1916)
  - XIX Corps (until September 1918)
- Assigned in May 1916:
  - I Corps (until July 1916)
  - XVII Corps (until August 1918)
- Assigned in June and July 1916:
  - III Corps (until July 1916)
  - 5th Infantry Division (until September 1916)
  - Corps "Hadfy" (until June 1917)
  - VIII Corps (until January 1917)
- Assigned in October 1916:
  - XIII Corps (until January 1918)
- Assigned in March and April 1917:
  - 5th Infantry Division (until December 1918)
  - XXVI Corps (until September 1917)

== Commanders ==
The following served as the commander of the 3rd Army during its existence.

3rd Army commanders
| From | Rank | Name |
|---|---|---|
| 14 August 1914 | General der Kavallerie | Rudolf von Brudermann |
| 4 September 1914 | General der Infanterie | Svetozar Boroević von Bojna |
| 25 May 1915 | Feldzeugmeister | Paul Puhallo von Brlog |
| 8 September 1915 | General der Kavallerie | Karl Tersztyánszky von Nádas |
| 27 September 1915 | Generaloberst | Hermann Kövess von Kövessháza |
| 20 October 1916 | Generaloberst | Karl von Kirchbach auf Lauterbach |
| 5 March 1917 | Generaloberst | Karl Tersztyánszky von Nádas |
| July 1917 | Generaloberst | Karl Křitek |

== Chiefs of staff ==
The following served as the chief of staff of the 3rd Army.

3rd Army chiefs of staff
| From | Rank | Name |
|---|---|---|
| August 1914 | Generalmajor | Rudolf Pfeffer |
| September 1914 | Generalmajor | Adolf von Boog |
| September 1915 | Oberst | Adalbert Dani von Gyarmata und Magyar-Cséke |
| September 1915 | Generalmajor | Theodor Konopicky |
| March 1917 | Oberst | Heinrich von Salis-Samaden |

== Sources ==
=== Books ===
- DiNardo, Richard L. (2010). Breakthrough: The Gorlice-Tarnow Campaign, 1915. Praeger. ISBN 978-0275991104.
- DiNardo, Richard L. (2015). Invasion: The Conquest of Serbia, 1915. Santa Barbara: Praeger. ISBN 978-1440800924.
- Herwig, Holger H. (2009). The First World War: Germany and Austria-Hungary 1914-1918. Bloomsbury Academic. ISBN 978-0340573488.
