= Carpathian Campaign =

Battle in World War I's Eastern Front

Battle of Carpathians
- Part of the Eastern Front during World War I
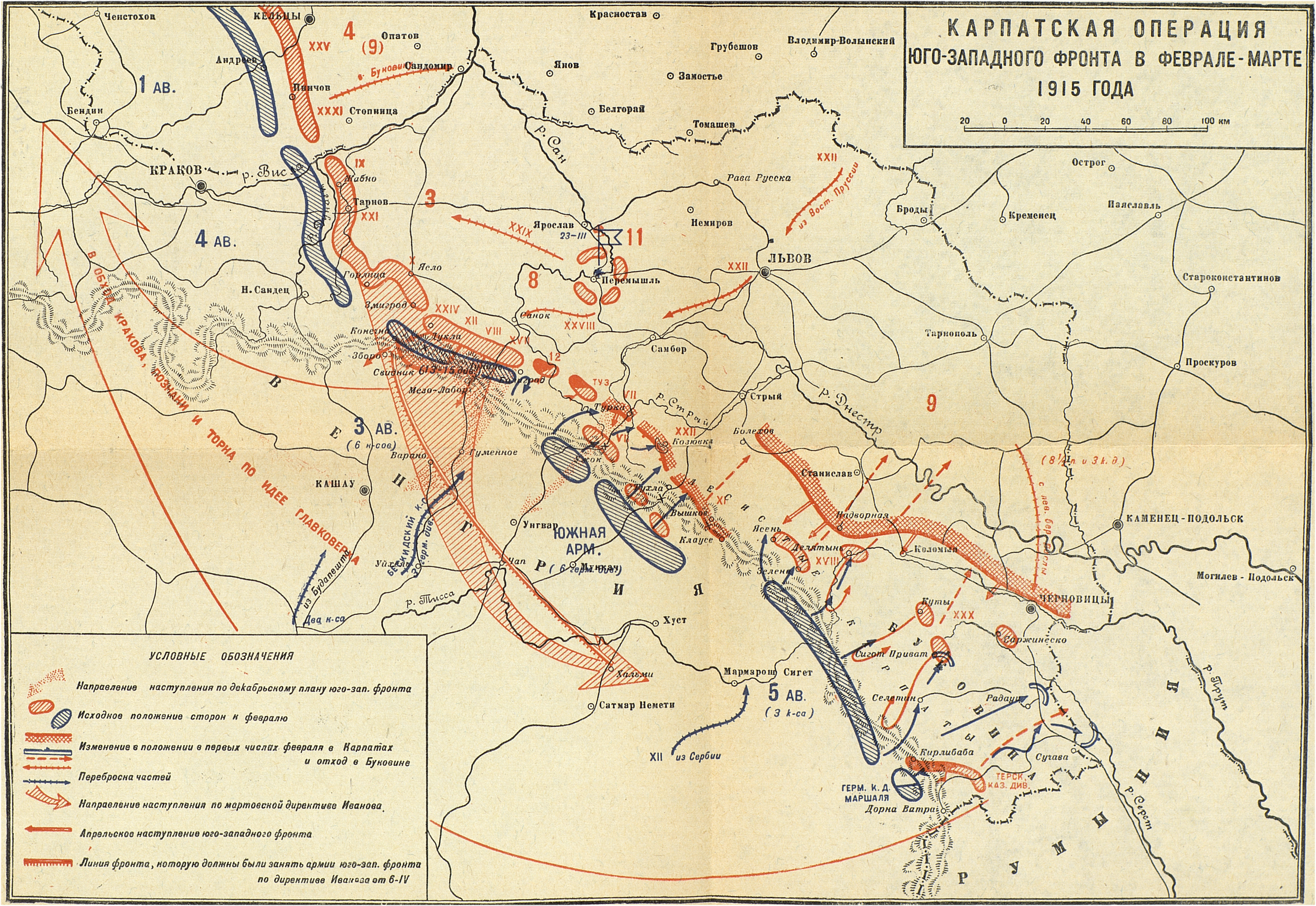
Date	January 23 – April 24 1915
Location	Carpathian Mountains, Austria-Hungary
Result	Russian victory Full results: Russia was able to protect the troops besieging Przemysl; Attempt of the central powers to break the siege of Przemysl failed
Territorial changes	Russians break through to the Hungarian plain

Belligerents
Russian Empire	Austria-Hungary; German Empire

Commanders and leaders
Nikolai Ivanov; Anton Yegorovich von Saltza (WIA); Radko Dimitriev; Aleksei Evert; Paul von Plehwe; Nikolai Ruzsky; Platon Lechitsky; Aleksei Brusilov	(Austria-Hungary) Archduke Friedrich (Austria-Hungary) Conrad von Hötzendorf (Austria-Hungary) Svetozar Boroević von Bojna (Austria-Hungary) Eduard von Böhm-Ermolli (Austria-Hungary) Karl von Pflanzer-Baltin (German Empire) Alexander von Linsingen

Units involved
3rd Army; 11th Army; 8th Army; 9th Army	(Austria-Hungary) 2nd Army (Austria-Hungary) 3rd Army (Austria-Hungary) 4th Army (German Empire) South Army

Strength
On 23.01.1915 only combat troops: 317,763 infantry 53,243 cavalry 919 machine guns 1,480 guns	On 23.01.1915 only combat troops: 389,204 infantry 23,384 cavalry 1,056 machine guns 3,118 guns

Casualties and losses
457,476 to 1,000,000 casualties (Note: 457,476; 800,000; 1,000,000)	523,128 to 900,000 casualties (Note: 523,128; 800,000 0; 900,000) (Note: The daily losses of the central powers are from 1 to 3 thousand people. The losses of Germany alone were 40 thousand prisoners. The Southern German army lost about 7 thousand people in two weeks of fighting on February 26 – March 10, and the 1st Infantry Division lost about 10 thousand during the entire period of the battle, that is, 100% of the composition)

The Carpathian Front, also called the Carpathian Winter War of 1915, was a series of operations along the Carpathian Mountains on the Eastern Front fought between the Russian Empire and Austria-Hungary, with support from Germany. The campaign began in late January 1915, after Russian forces repelled an Austro-Hungarian counteroffensive in December 1914. Operations focused on controlling the mountain passes and relieving the besieged fortress of Przemyśl.

Russian armies aimed to push into the Hungarian Plain and threaten Austria-Hungary, while the Central Powers sought to hold the passes and break the siege. The campaign took place in severe winter conditions and resulted in heavy casualties on both sides. By April 1915, Russian forces had crossed the Carpathians and entered the Hungarian Plain, while the Central Powers failed to achieve a decisive breakthrough, leaving the front largely unchanged until the subsequent Gorlice–Tarnów Offensive.

== Background ==
Having repulsed the counteroffensive of the Austro-Hungarian troops in late December 1914 – early January 1915, the Russian armies of the left flank of the Southwestern Front (8th and 11th) went on the offensive and again reached the Beskids, part of the passes of the main Carpathian ridge and captured almost throughout Bukovina. At the same time, the armies of the Northwestern Front, although they firmly occupied the positions to which they were withdrawn in early December (the lines of the Bzura, Pilica and Rawka rivers), they could not seize the initiative and go on the offensive against the German troops of the 9th Army.

Russian supreme headquarters under Grand Duke Nikolai Nikolayevich favoured a renewed offensive into East Prussia. However, the commander of the Southwestern Front, General Nikolai Ivanov, and his chief of staff Mikhail Alekseyev, proposed instead to shift the main attack to break through the Carpathians and reach the Hungarian Plain, opening a route toward Budapest and Vienna, and potentially forcing Austria-Hungary out of the war entirely.

To discuss the campaign plan for 1915, a meeting was held at Headquarters on January 17, 1915. General Yuri Danilov believed the active army would not be ready for a major offensive until April 1915, by which time the training of the 1915 intake and the replenishment of artillery shells were expected to be complete. He did, however, anticipate some reinforcement of the troops by February, and argued that the only theatre where a swift and decisive blow against the enemy could be expected was East Prussia—approached from the south. This view was supported by the commander of the Northwestern Front, Infantry General Nikolai Ruzsky, who attended the meeting, and was approved by the Supreme Commander.

However, Alekseyev, who had not attended the meeting, argued in his report of January 20 that the Austro-Hungarian forces should not be overlooked. He warned that they were being replenished far more rapidly and were receiving German assistance, making a fresh offensive from the Carpathians possible as early as mid-January. He proposed reinforcing the armies of the Southwestern Front and, pending the concentration of forces for the main offensive against Germany, advocated striking Austria-Hungary to push its troops back from Przemysl, secure a more favourable line beyond the Carpathians, bring cavalry into open operational space, and create a threat to Kraków from the southeast.

A directive from the headquarters of the Southwestern Front armies dated January 20, 1915 set out the objectives and means of the forthcoming operations:

It is necessary to use [with] possible energy our means of the right bank of the Vistula, inflict at least a partial defeat on the Austrians, put [in] a threatened position Hungary, occupy a more advantageous position than now, position without stretching the common strategic front.

The offensive was to be carried out by the reinforced 3rd, 8th, and 11th Armies. Thus, the Southwestern Front armies were given the objective of reaching the Hungarian Plain and advancing on Budapest, whose fall it was hoped would trigger the collapse of the alliance between Germany and Austria-Hungary and the disintegration of the Habsburg monarchy. The operations were subordinated to the overarching strategic goal of maximally weakening Germany by striking at what Russian headquarters considered its weakest link.

== Battle ==
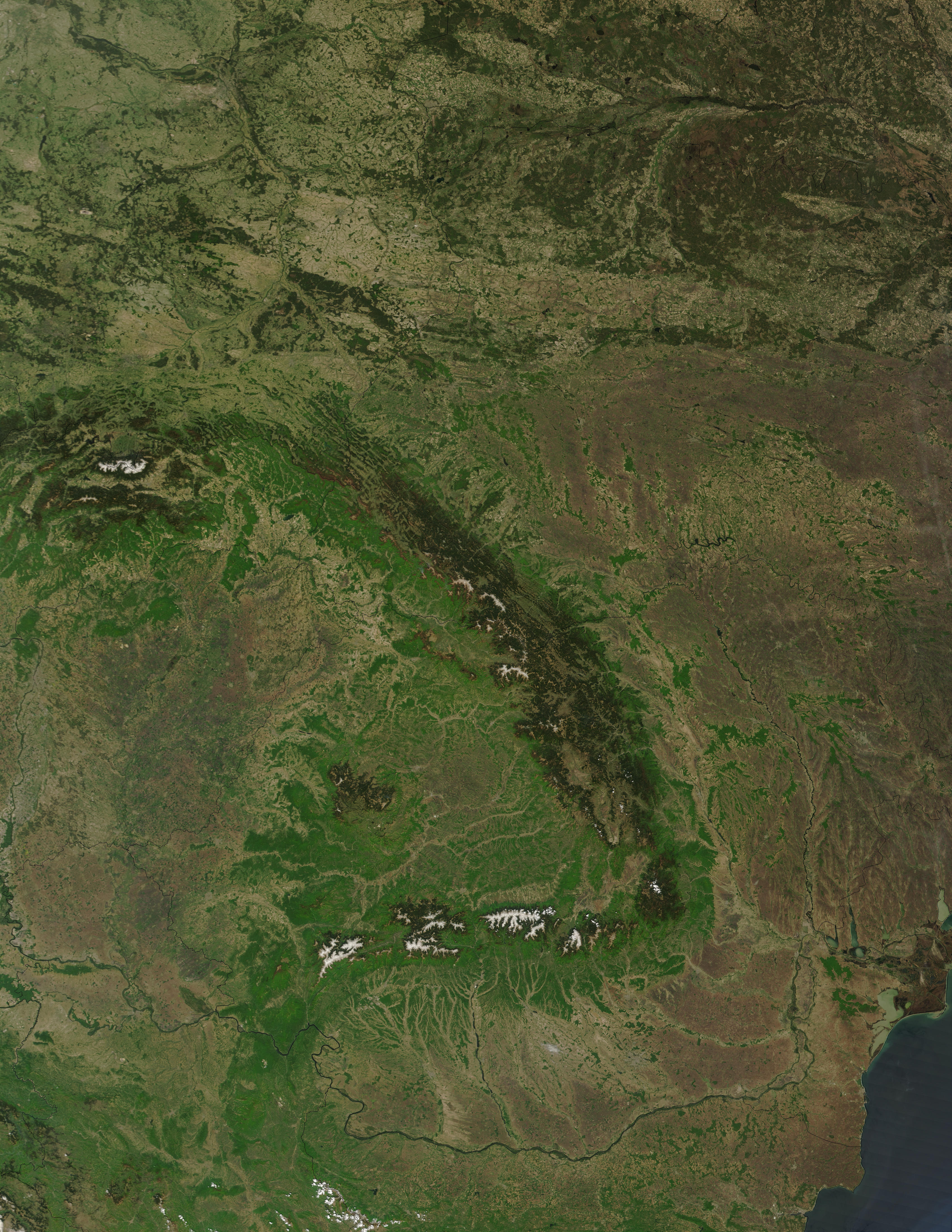
Modern satellite imagery of the Carpathian Mountains.

The Carpathians presented a natural obstacle to both sides, separating their respective territories. According to Prit Buttar:

The rugged peaks and passes of the Carpathians formed a natural barrier between Galicia, now in Russian hands, and the great plain of Hungary and the Danube valley. At the time, there were five main passes through the mountains, at Wyszkov, Verecke, Uzsok, Lupkov, and Dukla.

At the beginning of 1915, the Austro-Hungarian forces along the Carpathians included (west to east) Archduke Joseph Ferdinand of Austria's 4th Army, Svetozar Boroević's 3rd Army with the VII, X, and XVIII Corps, and Alexander von Linsingen's South Army. Russian forces consisted of Aleksei Brusilov's 8th Army, with the 24th, 12th, and 7th Army Corps, reinforced by the 22nd by the end of January.

Austria-Hungary's Franz Conrad von Hötzendorf planned a drive northwards from the Carpathians to commence on January 22, while the Russian Army planned an attack southwards to commence on January 25. By January 26, Linsingen's South Army was able to take the Verecke Pass, and advance onto the Uzsok Pass, while the Austro-Hungarian 3rd Army, after some initial success, had been driven back to their starting line. On February 5, the Russians captured the vital rail link at Mezőlaborc, while Boroević's 3rd Army of 135,000 men, suffered almost 89,000 dead, wounded, sick, or captured. The Russian ranks suffered comparably as the first campaign in the Carpathians concluded.

Hermann Kusmanek von Burgneustädten, the Przemyśl commander, estimated he had enough supplies to last until March. This prompted Conrad to try and advance past the Russian lines along the Carpathians once again, ordering Eduard von Böhm-Ermolli's 2nd Army to reach Przemyśl by March 12. Kolomea was captured by Karl von Pflanzer-Baltin on February 16, and the city of Stanislau on February 20. However, the Russians transferred their 9th Army to that sector, and by early March, Russian high command placed increased emphasis on a southern campaign. An invasion of Hungary would be an attempt to knock the Austro-Hungarian Empire out of the war, and according to Buttar, "In addition to weakening Germany by eliminating its main ally, this would induce Romania and Italy to enter the war against the Central Powers."

Heavy snow in mid-March paired with Russian counterattacks meant little change in battlefield positions until March 20, when the Russian offensive commenced. On March 22, Przemyśl surrendered. With Conrad's front line in danger of retreat, Georg von der Marwitz's Beskidenkorps counterattacked, forcing the Russians to be driven back, and their 8th and 9th Armies put on the defensive. After the Russians went on the defensive, the central powers attempted to break through the front of Brusilov's Army, creating a triple numerical superiority at the site of the attack, but this attempt was repulsed and the central powers were driven back to the Hungarian plain.

More than half of the 1.1 million Austro-Hungarian troops deployed on the Carpathian Front in the first four months of 1915 were killed, injured, captured, or incapacitated by disease, however, casualties became so high that the Austro-Hungarian army eventually lost detailed track of losses.

== Casualties and losses ==
Estimates of casualties in the Carpathian campaign vary between sources. Totals of around 1 million Russian and 800,000 Central Powers casualties have been cited, but these figures have been criticised as unreliable: the Russian figure derives from a 1925 statistical collection covering all fronts from the start of the war to May 1915, which Austrian historians then extrapolated specifically to the armies of the Southwestern Front.

Austro-Hungarian losses are reported differently depending on the source. Austrian official history gives 358,000 irrecoverable losses (dead and captured) and 435,000 wounded and sick for the Carpathian Campaign as a whole. A further breakdown for January–April 1915 lists 66,500 dead, 240,550 missing or captured, 180,500 wounded, and 306,100 sick, though the basis for these calculations was not specified.

According to Hungarian official history and German regimental sources, Austro-Hungarian losses from the Danube to Chernivtsi in January–April 1915 (excluding the Przemyśl garrison) included 1,058 officers and 51,626 soldiers killed or dead from wounds and disease, 1,941 officers and 177,366 soldiers missing or captured, and 3,039 officers and 143,884 soldiers wounded. Losses in the Przemyśl fortress were estimated at 120,000 men, with some authors suggesting an additional 10% for unaccounted losses.

Archival-based calculations for 15 January – 1 May 1915 give lower figures: 760 officers and 36,341 soldiers killed, 4,914 officers and 298,865 soldiers missing or captured, and 2,212 officers and 106,056 soldiers wounded. Wounded from the Przemyśl garrison were not evacuated and were counted among prisoners.

German losses in the Carpathians are given as 148 officers and 5,539 soldiers killed, 21 officers and 2,657 soldiers missing, and 201 officers and 12,648 soldiers wounded.

The casualties of the Russian side have not been fully calculated. Partial figures for the Southwestern Front (3rd, 4th, 9th and 11th Armies) for 14 January – 1 May 1915 give 570 officers and 68,866 soldiers killed, 354 officers and 134,122 soldiers captured, and 3,080 officers and 248,823 soldiers wounded.

During the fighting, Russian forces reported capturing 9 generals, 4,726 officers and 251,008 soldiers, along with artillery and other equipment. Central Powers forces reported capturing 308 officers and 105,383 Russian soldiers, as well as artillery and machine guns.

== Repression and ethnic policies ==
The fighting in the Carpathians brought severe hardship to the local civilian population. Following the reconquest of Bukovina, the Austro-Hungarian military authorities imposed strict martial law. The entire population was subject to re-registration, movement was restricted through a system of military passes, and special food requisitions were introduced. Reprisals were carried out against those suspected of having collaborated with the Russians. The Russian military authorities similarly subjected the local population to organized repression, which from January 1915 took on an explicitly ethnic character. On February 4, 1915, the Supreme Commander-in-Chief, Grand Duke Nikolai Nikolayevich, issued the following order regarding the Jewish population of Bukovina:

Starting from Bukovina, the Jews should be evicted following the retreating enemy and hostages should be taken from among the most prosperous and occupying public or other positions of the Jews.

The hostages were transported under guard to Kyiv province. Acting on this instruction, Ivanov further ordered that Jews be deported to a distance of no less than two hundred miles from army headquarters.

These orders generated considerable confusion and correspondence between army headquarters and the South-Western Front. On March 5, 1915, the Chief of Staff of the General Headquarters Nikolai Yanushkevich issued a clarifying directive:

The Jewish population, without distinction of sex and age, in the combat area should be evicted towards the enemy. The areas occupied by the rear units of the army must be cleared of all suspicious and unreliable persons. Regardless of this, in the last places, hostages should be taken from among those who enjoy influence.

In practice, expulsion "towards the enemy" proved unworkable under the conditions of positional warfare. The Jewish population of Galicia and Bukovina was instead deported into the Russian interior. On March 27, Yanushkevich telegraphed the front headquarters to clarify policy:

Information is coming from the Minister of the Interior about the attempted eviction of the Jews from Galicia deep into Russia. This is unacceptable, we already have too many of them. It was ordered to drive them forward behind the Austrians, and in the areas in the rear of the troops, who had long been occupied, to select from the most wealthy and important among the population and influence of the hostages, who should be evicted to Russia in the area of settled settlement, but under guard, that is, in prisons, and property sequester them. Rumours reached the Supreme Commander that with the movement forward, the inhabitants of the Jews were not evicted. I ask you to strictly confirm this requirement, and to confiscate the property of those who showed hostility in the slightest degree or are suspected of espionage.

The Minister of Internal Affairs designated the provinces of Poltava and Chernigov — outside the theater of war — for the internment of hostages. On April 7, 1915, the chief supply officer of the South-Western Front armies, General of Infantry Alexei Alekseevich Mavrin, confirmed the strict implementation of these measures. On April 21, the chief of staff of the 8th Army Corps, Major General Georgy Viranovsky, reported to 8th Army headquarters that the order had been carried out.

Ethnic discrimination extended into the ranks of the Russian army itself. On February 12, 1915, Yanushkevich declared soldiers of German colonial descent to be "unreliable" and ordered their transfer to the Caucasian Front, exempting only militiamen and non-combatants. Any soldiers who attempted to desert were to be fired upon without restraint. On the matter, he is quoted as saying "in general, no cruelty will be excessive."

In the 11th Army, then besieging Przemyśl, Commander Infantry General Andrey Selivanov ordered the disarmament of approximately 400 soldiers of German descent, who were placed under Cossack escort and assigned to earthworks duties in the 58th and 81st Infantry Divisions. Any failure of "honest service" was to be met with the full penalties of military law. On March 4, the Chief of Staff of the 11th Army, Major General Vladimir Sigismundovich Weil, ordered corps commanders to submit weekly reports detailing the work assigned to these soldiers, their conduct, and any influence they might be exerting on other troops. Until the end of the siege of the fortress at Przemyśl, not a single case of evasion or subversion was recorded among soldiers of German descent. Divisional commanders, the commander of the siege artillery, and the commander of the army telegraph company all commended their performance, and in several cases their weapons were returned to them.

== Outcome ==
The Russians had the upper hand in the battle. On March 30, they successfully crossed the Carpathians and entered the Hungarian plain. The Central Powers, in turn, were unable to relieve Przemyśl and were pushed back by the Russian 8th Army.

== Sources ==
- Nelipovich, Sergei (2022). Русский фронт 1915: Потери сторон [The Russian Front 1915: Losses of the sides] (in Russian). Moscow: Квадрига. ISBN 978-5-91791-447-3.
- Oskin, Maxim (2007). Зима 1915: Штурм Карпат [Winter 1915: Storming of the Carpathians] (in Russian). Moscow: Цейхгауз. ISBN 978-5-9771-0036-6.
- Gilbert, Martin (2023). The First World War: A complete History. Moscow: Квадрига. ISBN 978-5-389-08465-0.
- Oleynikov, Alexei (2016). Россия-щит Антанты [Russia-Shield of Entente]. Foreword by Nikolai Starikov. St.Petersburg: Piter. ISBN 978-5-496-01795-4.
- Брусилов, Алексей (2023). Мои воспоминания. Из царской армии в Красную. Moscow: Москва. ISBN 978-5-04-176827-0.
- Борисюк, Андрей (2023). История России, которую приказали забыть. Николай II и его время; [5-е издание]. St. Petersburg: Питер. ISBN 978-5-4484-3841-7.
- Oldenburg, Sergey (2022) [1st pub. 1939]. Царствование императора Николая 2 [The Reign of Emperor Nicholas II] (in Russian). Moscow: центрополиграф. ISBN 978-5-227-09905-1.
- Oleynikov, Alexei (2023). Германский натиск на Восток 1915 [The German push to the East 1915] (in Russian). ISBN 978-5-4484-4327-5.
