= 2nd Guards Corps (Russian Empire) =

The 2nd Guards Corps was a formation of the Imperial Russian Army that saw service in World War I. It was founded in November 1915 and disbanded in early 1918.

== Composition ==
It participated in military operations on the South-Western (1915 - November 1916, April 1917 - 1918) and Western (November 1916 - April 1917) fronts.

== Commanders ==
- 12/08/1915 - 05/27/1916 - General of Infantry Vladimir Apollonovich Olokhov
- 05/27/1916 - 04/02/1917 - Lieutenant General Georgy Ottonovich Rauch
- 04/02/1917 - 04/29/1917 - Major General Georgy Nikolaevich Viranovsky (acting)
- 04/29/1917 - 08/19/1917 - Lieutenant General Georgy Nikolaevich Viranovsky
- 08/25/1917 - 04/1918 - Lieutenant General Vsevolod Vladimirovich Chernavin

== Literature ==
- Zalessky K. A. The First World War. Rulers and Warlords: A Biographical Encyclopedic Dictionary. - M .: Veche, 2000 .-- 576 p. - (Military secrets of the XX century). - ISBN 5-7838-0627-7.
- Military Encyclopedic Dictionary. M., Military Publishing House, 1984. Southwestern Front 1914–1917, p. 838
