= 7th Army (Austria-Hungary) =

Austro-Hungarian army during World War I

7. Armee; 7th Army
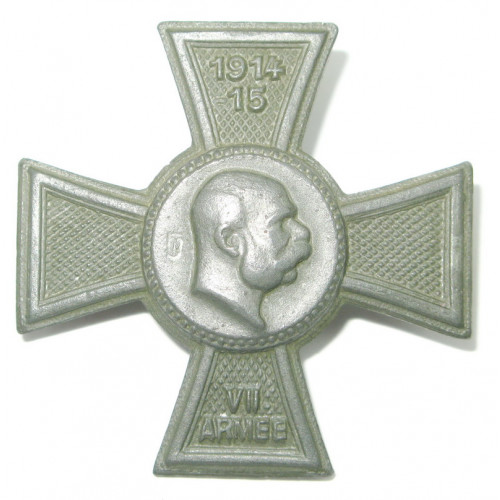
- Cap Badge
- Active: May 1915 – April 1918
- Country: Austria-Hungary
- Type: Field Army
- Engagements: World War I

The Austro-Hungarian Seventh Army was an Austro-Hungarian field army that fought during World War I.

== Actions ==
The Austro-Hungarian Seventh Army was formed in May 1915 and deployed on the Russian Front. It remained active there until it was disbanded in April 1918.

It participated in the

- Gorlice–Tarnów Offensive (May-June 1915),
- Great Retreat (June-September 1915)
- Battle of the Strypa River
- Brusilov Offensive (June-September 1916)
- Kerensky Offensive (July 1917)
- Operation Faustschlag (February-March 1918)

== Commanders ==
- Karl von Pflanzer-Baltin : 8 May 1915 – 8 September 1916
- Karl Graf von Kirchbach auf Lauterbach : 8 September 1916 – 20 October 1916
- Hermann Kövess von Kövesshaza : 20 October 1916 – 16 January 1918
- Karl Kritek : 16 January 1918 – 15 April 1918

== Sources ==
- Austro-Hungarian Army, Higher Commands and Commanders
