= Karl Tersztyánszky von Nádas =

Austro-Hungarian army officer (1854–1921)

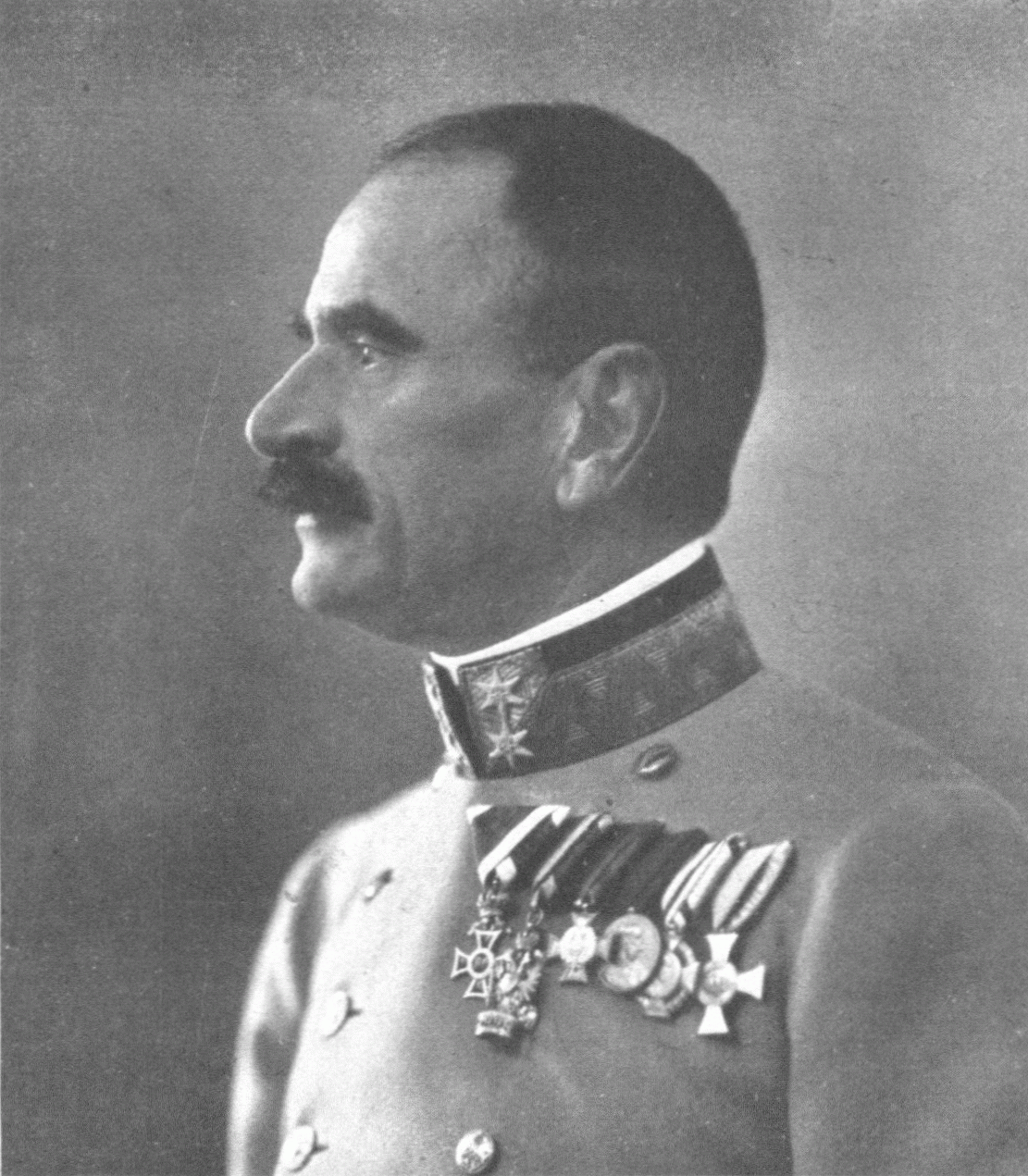
- Tersztyánszky in 1913
- Born: 28 October 1854; Szakolca, Kingdom of Hungary (today Skalica, Slovakia)
- Died: 7 March 1921 (aged 66); Vienna, First Austrian Republic
- Burial place: Vienna Central Cemetery
- Military career
- Allegiance: Austria-Hungary
- Branch: Austro-Hungarian Army
- Service years: 1877–1918
- Rank: Generaloberst
- Commands: IV Corps; 3rd Army; 4th Army
- Conflicts: World War I
- Awards: Order of Leopold; Order of the Red Eagle

Karl Tersztyánszky von Nádas, officially Károly Tersztyánszky, also alternatively written Tersztyánszky de Nádas (28 October 1854 – 7 March 1921) was an Austro-Hungarian general who served in World War I.

== Biography ==
Tersztyánszky was born in Szakolca in the Kingdom of Hungary (today Skalica, Slovakia) on 29 October 1854. He graduated from the Theresian Military Academy in Vienna in 1877 and was commissioned into the Austro-Hungarian Army. Afterwards the dragoon officer went to war school, served in the general staff and held various cavalry commands. While his stubborn, cantankerous and hot-headed behaviour often got him into trouble he nonetheless was frequently commended by his superiors and enjoyed the patronage of the heir Archduke Franz Ferdinand of Austria (until his assassination in 1914) and Chief of Staff Franz Conrad von Hötzendorf. In 1913 Tersztyánszky was promoted to the rank of General der Kavallerie.

When World War I began Tersztyánszky, commanding IV Corps, served as part of 2nd Army in the Balkans theatre. Later that year the unit was transferred to the Eastern Front to fight in Galicia and Poland. In late spring 1915 he was given command of the short-lived Army Group Tersztyánszky, which soon became the 3rd Army, in Serbia. However, later that year he lost command after clashing with Hungarian Prime Minister István Tisza.

Tersztyánszky had to wait until mid 1916 for a new assignment, now as a recently promoted Generaloberst. He got command of the 4th Army during the Brusilov Offensive, back on the Eastern Front. He took the place of Archduke Joseph Ferdinand of Austria who had been dismissed on insistence of German general Alexander von Linsingen for failures during said campaign. In 1917 Tersztyánszky was relieved once more after clashing with von Linsingen, and was to lead 3rd Army again. However he was removed from command for a final time when unable to hold the lines during the Kerensky Offensive.

Tersztyánszky then served on a ceremonial post as commander of the Imperial and Royal Mounted Lifeguard Squadron. He finally retired in December 1918 after the war had ended; and lived in Vienna until he died there on 7 March 1921.

== Decorations ==
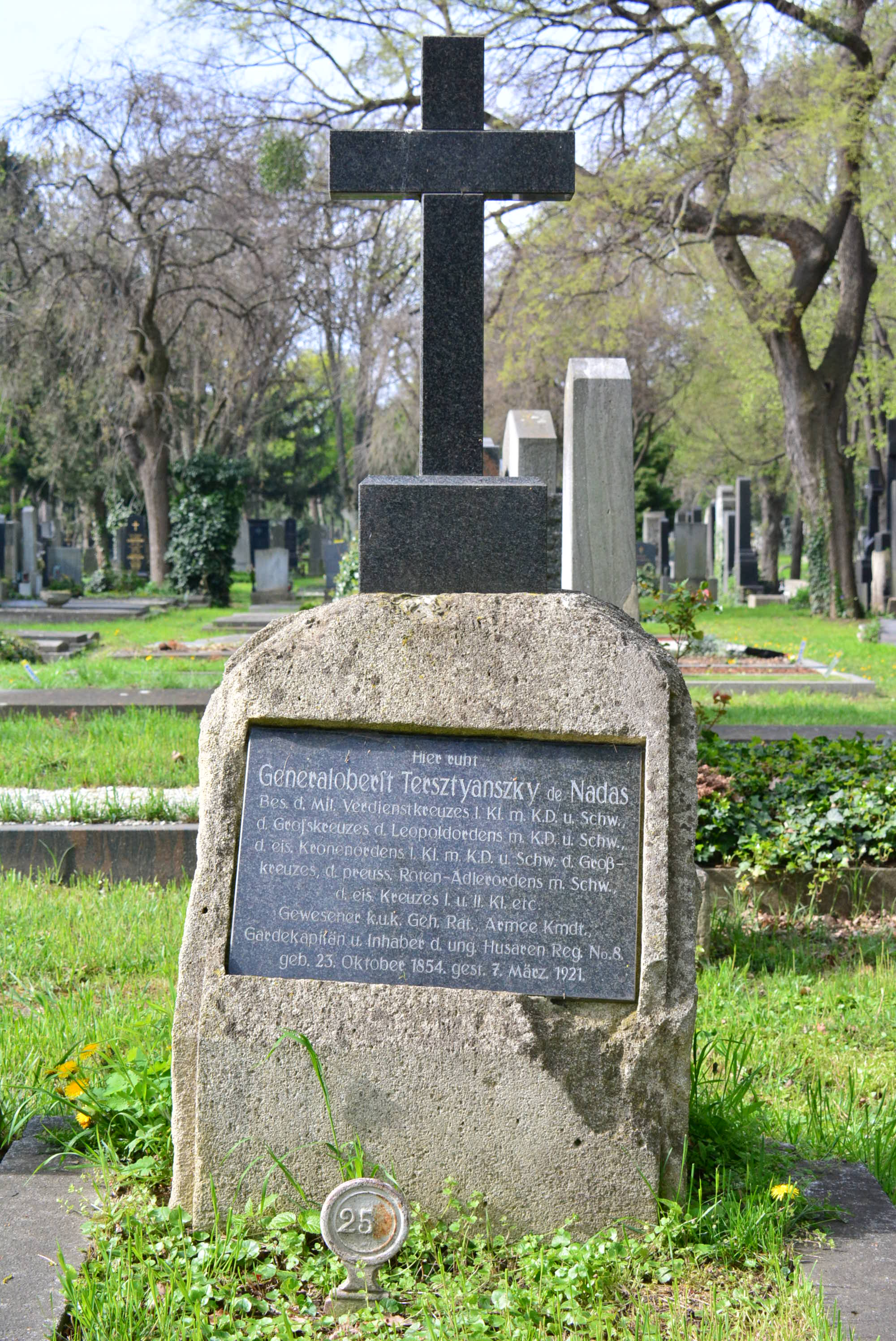
Tersztyánszky's gravestone

Among his decorations and recognitions were:

- Grand Cross of the Order of Leopold (with Swords and War Decoration)
- Order of the Iron Crown 1st Class (with Swords and War Decoration)
- Knights Cross of the Order of Leopold
- Order of the Iron Crown 3rd Class
- Military Merit Cross 1st Class (with Swords and War Decoration)
- Star of the Decoration for Services to the Red Cross (with War Decoration)
- Decoration for Services to the Red Cross 1st Class (with War Decoration)
- Bronze Military Merit Medal (on the ribbon of the Military Merit Cross)
- Long Service Cross for Officers 2nd Class
- Bronze Jubilee Medal for the Armed Forces
- 1908 Jubilee Cross
- Mobilization Cross 1912/13
- Geheimrat
- Regimentsinhaber of Hussar Regiment No 8 "von Tersztyánszky"
- Grand Cross of the Order of the Red Eagle (Prussia)
- Iron Cross 1st and 2nd classes (Prussia)

== See also ==
- List of Austro-Hungarian colonel generals
