= Georgy Viranovsky =

Russian general (1867–1920)

Georgy Nikolaevich Viranovsky
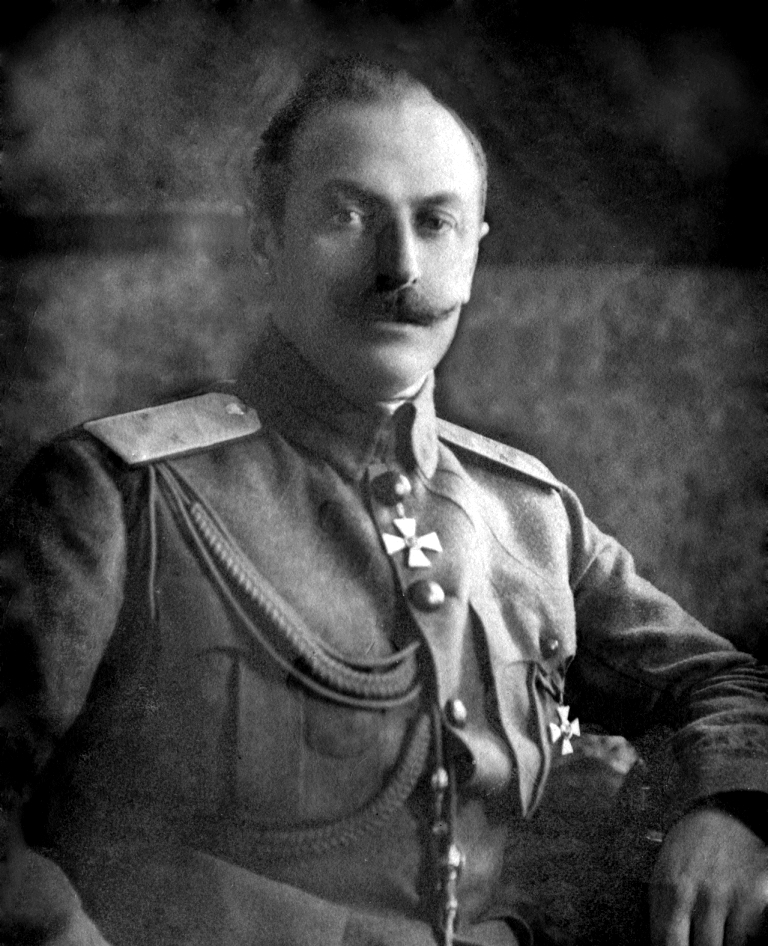
- Viranovsky in 1916
- Born: November 13, 1867; Kherson Governorate, Russian Empire
- Died: 1920 (aged 52–53)
- Allegiance: Russian Empire (Russia) White Movement
- Branch: Imperial Russian Army (Russia) White Army
- Service years: 1885–1919
- Rank: Lieutenant General
- Commands: 2nd Guards Corps
- Conflicts: Boxer Rebellion; Russo-Japanese War; World War I Russian Civil War

Georgy Nikolaevich Viranovsky (Russian: Георгий Николаевич Вирановский; November 13, 1867 – 1920) was a Russian commander, participant in the Russo-Japanese War and World War I, Lieutenant General (April 29, 1917), and participant in the White Movement during the Civil War (1918-1920). He was Cavalier of the Order of St. George 3rd and 4th degree.

== Biography ==
=== Family ===
Georgy Nikolaevich Viranovsky was born to into the noble family of the Viranovsky: His father was Colonel Nikolai Antonovich Viranovsky (1816-1896) who was a member of the Defense of Sevastopol in 1854–1855, his mother was Alexandra Vasilyevna, née Belokon .

He had five brothers: Alexander (born in 1857), Nikolai (born in 1859), Ivan (born in 1861), Konstantin (born in 1866), Peter (1872–1940) and three sisters: Elizabeth (born in 1863), Natalia (1869-1917) and Maria (born in 1870).

He was married to Elena Arturovna, née Luix, daughter of a Belgian citizen. They had three sons: Boris (1893-1968), George (1896-1926) and Nikolai (1910-1985).

=== Education ===
Viranovsky graduated in 1885 from the Vladimir Kiev Cadet Corps, in 1887 - the 3rd Military Alexander School in the 1st category, in 1897 - the Nikolaev Academy of the General Staff in the 1st category.

=== Service in the Russian army ===
- August 28 (September 9), 1885 - cadet of rank. February 11, 1886 - second lieutenant.
- August 7, 1887 he was appointed to the 56th Infantry Regiment of Zhytomyr.
- May 20, 1890 he was seconded to the 14th artillery brigade for testing in the service and subsequently transferring to artillery. From May 15, 1891 - lieutenant. On July 16, 1891, he was transferred to the 14th artillery brigade, and on August 12 he was assigned to the 4th battery.
- July 28, 1896 - headquarters captain; May 19 (31), 1897 - captain.
- May 26, 1897 was assigned to the General Staff and appointed to serve in the Kiev Military District.
- On January 17, 1898, he was transferred to the General Staff with the appointment of the 19th Infantry Division as the senior adjutant of the headquarters.
- November 24, 1898 - Senior Adjutant to the headquarters of the 21st Army Corps.
- On the occasion of military operations in the Far East, from July 16 to December 18, 1900, he was sent to the command of the 3rd Rifle Brigade to fulfil the duties of senior adjutant. It was located within Manchuria, participated in the expedition of Colonel A.S. Khatova from September 2 (14) to October 10 (22), 1900 (with a shoot-out on September 28 (October 10)).
- On February 5, 1901, he was assigned for a one-year term to the 166th Rivne Infantry Regiment for commanding a company.
- December 6, 1901 - lieutenant colonel, appointed acting headquarters officer for special assignments at the headquarters of the 9th Army Corps.
- On October 25, 1903, he was appointed headquarters officer for special assignments at the headquarters of the Odessa Military District. Since January 26 (February 8), 1904 - Senior Adjutant of the Headquarters of the Odessa Military District. The censored command of the battalion served in the 14th Rifle Regiment from June 12 (25) to October 10 (23), 1904.
- On October 11, 1904, he was transferred to correct the position of headquarters officer commanded by the 4th Rifle Brigade, and from October 25 (November 7), he was transferred as headquarters officer. December 6 (19), 1905 - Colonel. Member of the Russo-Japanese War of 1904-1905 from 1905 to May 1906.
- July 22, 1907 he was appointed chief of staff of the Odessa camp. From May 13 (26) to July 13 (26), 1908 he was assigned to the artillery, and from July 13 (26) to August 15 (26), 1908 to cavalry.
- Since June 1, 1911 - commander of the 16th rifle emperor Alexander III regiment. After the outbreak of World War I, he took command of the brigade of the 65th Infantry Division. From August 12 (25), 1914 - Major General.

“In battles near the village of Podbuzh, from October 3 to 11, 1914, he personally controlled the detachment's actions, repelled a number of stubborn attacks of the enemy superior in strength and then went on a decisive attack, took height near the village of Podbuzh, after which the battle took a decisive turn in favor of the Russian troops."

- December 14, 1914 he was appointed chief of staff of the 8th artillery corps.
- May 4, 1916 - commander of the 12th Infantry Division.

“On May 28, 1916, commanding the 12th Infantry Division, personally leading it, repeatedly, with obvious danger to life, leaving for the regiment's military location, attacked the enemy, advancing from the village of Black Stream, broke through his fortified position and pursuing the enemy, went to the rear with a height of "272" and on the flank of the enemy, defending a height of "458", which made him clear the height of "272" and made it easier for the 32nd division to master the height of "458", as a result of which the Austrians were driven back by the 11th army corps, first R. "The rod, and then to the mountains, and the city of Chernivtsi was occupied and 729 officers, 28021 lower ranks, 30 guns, 92 machine guns, 26 bomb guns, 9 mortars and many other trophies were captured.”

- December 6 (19), 1916, he was appointed acting chief of staff of the 6th Army, General V.N. Gorbatovsky.

After the February Revolution, on April 2 (15), 1917, he was appointed commander of the 2nd Guards Corps of the 11th Army. April 29, 1917 - lieutenant general.

Letter dated June 30 from General Dukhonin, who was the chief of staff of the South-Western Front, to General Kornilov, then commander of the 8th Army: “Gracious Sovereign, Lavr Georgievich! The Commander-in-Chief on duty, ordered you to provide the following information below about the activities of the commander of the 2nd Guards Corps, General Viranovsky, and the headquarters of this corps, received from military organizations and related to the twentieth of June this year. In the corps, a mood was set against the offensive. General V., himself an opponent of the offensive, told the divisional committees that in no case would he led the guards to slaughter. In an interview with the divisional committees, General V. explained all the disadvantages and difficulties of the offensive that fell to the corps, and pointed out that no one would support the corps either from the right, from the left, or from behind. The ranks of the corps headquarters were generally amazed how the commander in chief could give such tasks, the insolubility of which is clear even to the delegate soldiers. The corps headquarters was not occupied with finding ways to fulfil the difficult task assigned to the corps, but tried to prove that this task was impossible.”

- On August 19, 1917, he was transferred to the reserve of ranks at the Kiev headquarters, and on September 8 (21), 1917 - to the Odessa military district.
- September 9, 1917, when after the performance of General L. G. Kornilov many command posts were vacated, he was appointed commander of the 26th artillery corps of the 9th army.
- Since October 23, 1917 - Chief of Staff of the Assistant Commander-in-Chief of the Romanian Front Armies.

=== Civil War ===
After the dissolution of the front, he lived in the Karpovo estate, but a year later he crossed, circling Asia on the Eastern Front by sea, where he arrived in August 1919. He served in the army of Admiral Alexander Kolchak as chief supply officer of the 2nd and 3rd armies. January 1920, he was captured by units of the 5th Army (RSFSR) in Krasnoyarsk.

He was listed on the lists of the intelligence department of the headquarters of the 5th Army (RSFSR) of the Soviet Red Army on February 4, 1920. It was placed at the disposal of the chief of the General Headquarters, the lists of which are mentioned between May 15 and August 7, 1920. He was executed in captivity in 1920. According to another version, he died of typhus.

== Contemporaries' comments about George Nikolaevich ==
Lieutenant General A.S. Lukomsky recalled:

"G. N. Viranovsky was at the same time with me at the Academy. He was a good friend, and we all loved him, but he was extremely frivolous and did not differ in particularly firm morality. During the war, as chief of staff of the corps (with V. M. Dragomirov), he received the 4th degree George, and commanding the 12th infantry division, he received the 3rd degree in 1916. During the period of the revolution and the collapse of the army, commanding the corps and the [army], it turned out to be extremely unstable and, under pressure from the “committee”, submitted to the commander in chief of the Southwestern Front General Denikin a note about the need to remove all management concerns from senior commanders, keeping them in their hands as "specialists", only combat and combat command. Denikin immediately ousted him and during the struggle with the Bolsheviks in southern Russia did not want to accept Viranovsky into the army.

"Viranovsky went to the Far East to Kolchak, but he got there already during the collapse and was shot somewhere by the Bolsheviks."

From the memoirs of V.N. von Dreyer:

“He was a brilliant man in every way. Officer of the General Staff, well-educated, witty, very prominent, handsome, brave; he perfectly commanded a regiment in the war, for which he received two St. George's crosses and two generals' ranks. At the beginning of the revolution, Viranovsky was already in the position of chief of staff of the Romanian front, with General Shcherbachev. ... Lieutenant General Georgy Nikolaevich Viranovsky suffered from the fact that he could not indifferently see a single pretty woman. Because of one of them, Shcherbachev was forced, one fine day, to replace General Herois in his place ... The last time I saw Viranovsky was in Odessa a year later; like many, he was already an emigrant, running away from the Bolsheviks, but still the same prominent, elegant, who did not take his eyes off beautiful women. They say that he managed to get to Siberia, where he died.”

== Awards ==
- December 6, 1899 - Order of St. Stanislav 3rd degree
- December 6, 1903 - Order of St. Anne of the 3rd degree
- October 31, 1905 - Order of St. Stanislav, 2nd degree
- December 31, 1905 - Order of St. Stanislav of the 2nd degree with swords and a bow (approved on July 8 (21), 1907 for works incurred in the war with Japan)
- February 12, 1908 - Order of St. Anne of the 2nd degree
- 1911 - Order of St. Vladimir, 4th degree
- December 6, 1913 - Order of St. Vladimir, 3rd class
- April 24, 1915 - Order of St. George, 4th class (for the battles of November 3–10 (23), 1914 near the village of Podbuzh)
- 1915 - Order of St. Stanislav 1st degree with swords
- 1916 - Order of St. Anne, 1st degree
- August 4 (17), 1916 - Order of St. George, 3rd class (for difference during the offensive on May 28 (June 10) 1916 near the village of Black Stream)
- 1902 - silver medal for a trip to China in 1900-1901
- 1906 - light bronze medal commemorating the war with Japan of 1904–1905.

== Bibliography ==
- Zalessky K. A. Who was who in the First World War. - M .: AST; Astrel, 2003 .-- 896 p. - 5,000 copies. - ISBN 5-17-019670-9 (ACT); ISBN 5-271-06895-1 (Astrel).
- Volkov E.V., Egorov N.D., Kuptsov I.V. White generals of the Eastern Front of the Civil War: Biogr. ref. - M.: Russian Way, 2003. - ISBN 5-85887-169-0

=== Works by G.N. Viranovsky ===
- Viranovsky G. N. Sore thoughts about the lost campaign (Reasons for Russia's defeat in the Russo-Japanese War). - Odessa, 1911. - 15 p.

Preceded by Georgy Ottonovich Rauch	Commander of the 2nd Guards Corps; April 2 - August 19, 1917	Succeeded by
