= Paul Puhallo von Brlog =

Paul Freiherr Puhallo von Brlog
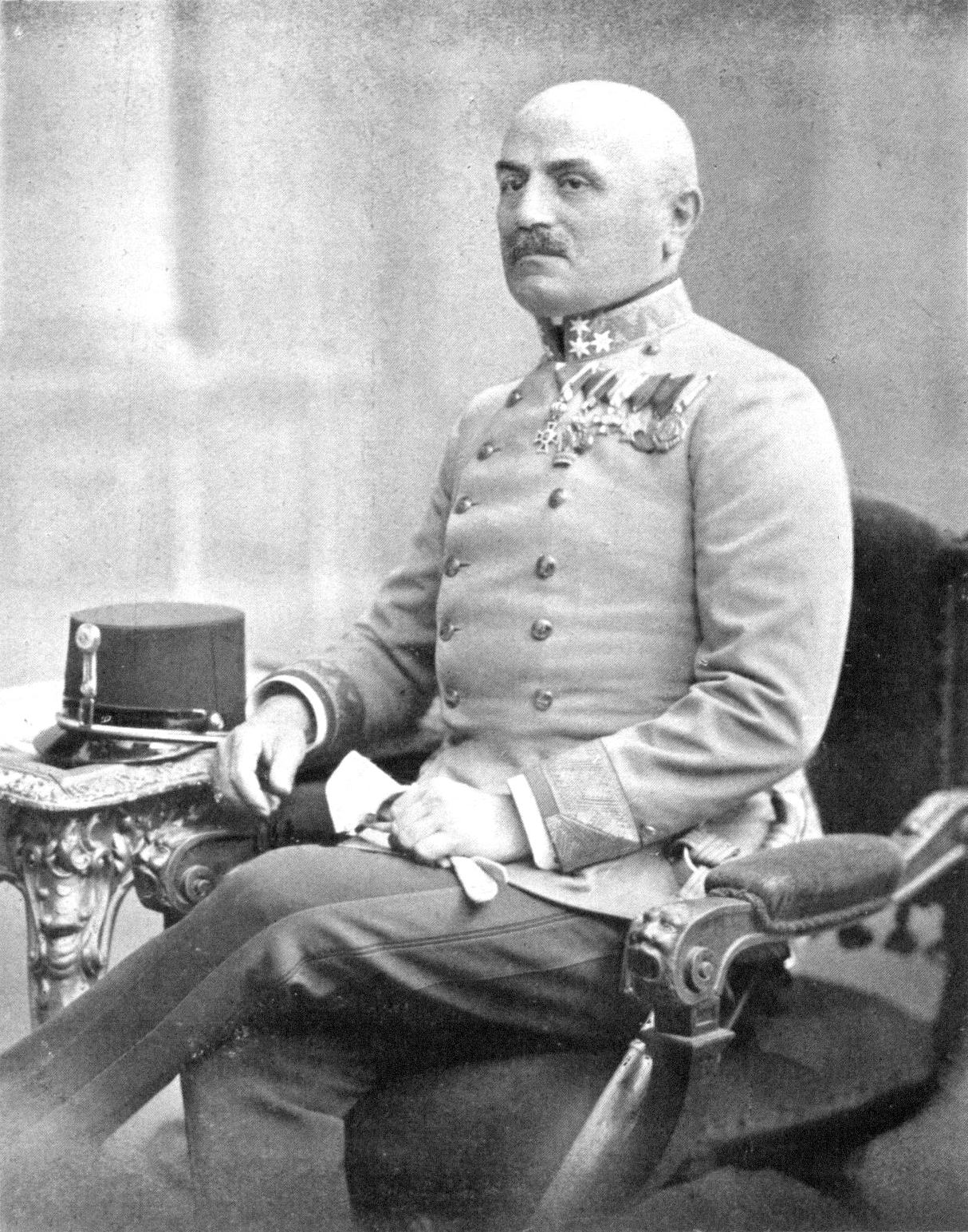
- Paul Freiherr Puhallo von Brlog, c. 1913–1914
- Born: 21 February 1856; Brlog, Austrian Empire (now Croatia)
- Died: 12 October 1926 (aged 70); Vienna, Austria
- Burial place: Linz, Austria
- Military career
- Allegiance: Austria-Hungary
- Branch: Austro-Hungarian Army
- Service years: 1877–1917
- Rank: Colonel general
- Commands: 50th Infantry Brigade; Austro-Hungarian war college; 46th Landwehr Infantry Division; V Corps; 3rd Army; 1st Army
- Conflicts: World War I; Battle of Galicia; Battle of Kraśnik; Battle of the Vistula River; Siege of Przemyśl; Gorlice–Tarnów Offensive; Brusilov Offensive
- Awards: Military Merit Cross; Order of the Iron Crown 3rd class

Paul Freiherr Puhallo von Brlog (21 February 1856 – 12 October 1926) was a general of Austria-Hungary. During World War I, he commanded the Austro-Hungarian Army's 3rd and 1st Armies.

== Biography ==
=== Early life ===
Puhallo's family came from the vicinity of the Croatian Military Frontier of the Austrian Empire and Austria-Hungary. Born in the Austrian Empire at Brlog in Croatia on 21 February 1856, Puhallo was the son of the Imperial and Royal officer Michael Puhallo (1818-1913). He attended military educational institutions in Hungarian Weißkirchen, Kamenitz, and Güns (Kőszeg) and entered military technology school in Mährisch Weißkirchen in 1870, where he studied until 1873.

=== Pre-World War I military service ===
After successfully completing studies at the Imperial and Royal Technical Military Academy in Vienna, Puhallo became a Leutnant (lieutenant) in Field Artillery Regiment No. 11 on 1 September 1877. Between 1880 and 1882 he attended the advanced artillery course in Vienna, which he completed with great success. On 1 November 1882, he received a promotion to Oberleutnant (first lieutenant) and was assigned to the General Staff Corps. He was promoted to Captain First Class on 1 November 1886 while serving as a tactics instructor at the Technische Militärakademie. On 18 September 1892, he was appointed chief of staff of the 3rd Infantry Division in Linz, where he was promoted to major on 1 May 1893. On 1 November 1895, he became an Oberstleutnant (lieutenant colonel) in the General Staff Corps. In April 1896 he was transferred to the 55th Infantry Regiment in Tarnopol. During these years he received excellent performance reviews from his superiors, who often especially emphasized his great talent as an instructor. As a result, he was transferred to the war college on 11 September 1898, and he was promoted to Oberst (colonel) on 1 November 1898. In the meantime, he had married Anna Hörzinger in 1897. He had a daughter with her.

In 1902, Puhallo was transferred to the Operations Bureau of the General Staff, of which he became chief on 23 April 1903. In April 1905 he was appointed commander of the 50th Infantry Brigade in Vienna, and he received a promotion to Generalmajor (major general) on 1 May 1905. On 20 October 1906, he was appointed commander of the Austro-Hungarian war college. Under his leadership, the college was modernized in many areas in order to achieve a higher quality education for Austro-Hungarian military officers; he reorganized the college and introduced new courses. On 1 May 1909, he was promoted to Feldmarschalleutnant (lieutenant field marshal). In September 1910 he took command of the 46th Landwehr Infantry Division in Kraków. In October 1912 he succeeded General of the Infantry Arthur Heinrich Sprecher von Bernegg as commander of the V Corps in Preßburg. On 1 November 1913, he was promoted to Feldzeugmeister (general of the artillery).

=== World War I ===
When World War I began with Austria-Hungary's declaration of war on Serbia on 28 July 1914, Puhallo's V Corps — made up of the 14th and 33rd Infantry Divisions and the 37th Honvéd Division — was part of General of the Cavalry Victor Dankl's 1st Army, which was deployed in northern Galicia. During the larger Battle of Galicia, Puhallo's troops were involved in Dankl's victory over Imperial Russian Army forces in the Battle of Kraśnik of 23–25 August 1914, but after Russian counterattacks caused the Austro-Hungarian forces to the south to collapse, Puhallo's corps, along with the rest of the 1st Army, had to withdraw from the southern approaches to Lublin along the San River and pull back behind the San until mid-September 1914.

In the Battle of the Vistula River, which began on 29 September 1914, Puhallo's troops advanced into Russian Poland as part of the 1st Army. After fighting at Ivangorod, his troops were forced to retreat again at the end of October 1914. After heavy fighting on the Nida, his V Corps was transferred to the Carpathian Mountains at Christmas 1914 where, as part of the Austro-Hungarian 3rd Army, it took part in the unsuccessful struggle to relieve the Siege of Przemyśl, at the end of which the garrison of the Przemyśl Fortress surrendered to the Russians in March 1915.

In May 1915 the V Corps reached Sambor, whereupon Puhallo took command of the 3rd Army on 22 May 1915. As part of Army Group Mackensen under the German General August von Mackensen together with the Imperial German Army's 11th Army, the 3rd Army took part in the Gorlice–Tarnów Offensive of May–June 1915, during which Puhallo was able to recapture the Przemyśl Fortress at the beginning of June 1915. As a result of a reorganization, the 3rd Army was disbanded, and Puhallo succeeded Dankl as commander of the 1st Army on 10 June 1915. In the aftermath of the Gorlice–Tarnów Offensive, the Imperial Russian Army conducted the "Great Retreat" — a vast strategic withdrawal — between July and September 1915, during which Puhallo's army — consisting of the I Army Corps under General of the Cavalry Karl von Kirchbach auf Lauterbach, the II Army Corps under General of the Infantry John Ferdinand Franz von Kirchbach auf Lauterbach, the corps of Lieutenant Field Marshal S. Shurma, and an army reserve of two divisions — took the bridgeheads at Sandomierz and Tarlo-Josefow, seeing particularly hard fighting around Sokal during the reconquest of Lemberg. The front stabilized after the Central Powers captured Lvov and Dubno.

During the first half of 1916, Puhallo's army was subordinated to the Austro-Hungarian Army Group Böhm-Ermolli. After the 1st Army was transferred to the Bug sector in 1916, Puhallo and his army were subordinated to the German Army Group Linsingen under the command of the German General Alexander von Linsingen. On 1 May 1916 he was promoted to colonel general with a date of rank of 13 May 1916.

When the Russian Brusilov Offensive began in June 1916, Puhallo's troops were defeated and forced to join a general retreat. Another reorganization of the Austro-Hungarian Army led to the dissolution of his 1st Army, whereupon Puhallo lost his command on 25 July 1916 and was transferred to the reserve. The Austro-Hungarian Army's high command was dissatisfied with his performance and did not offer him another command despite his repeated requests for one. Nonetheless, he was decorated on 7 April 1917 with the Grand Cross of the Order of Leopold with War Decoration and Swords, followed by the elevation to baron in the Hungarian nobility on 27 April 1917. He was dismissed from the army on 1 May 1917. Austria-Hungary's participation in World War I ended with the Armistice of Villa Giusti on 3 November 1918, and Puhallo officially retired on 1 December 1918.

=== Later life ===
After his retirement, and in the wake of the disintegration of Austria-Hungary, Puhallo became a citizen of the new Kingdom of Serbs, Croats and Slovenes. Receiving only a small pension from the state for his service in the Austro-Hungarian Army, he lived in relative poverty. For this reason, he moved back to Vienna, which was now in the Republic of Austria, and lived there, surviving on donations from former comrades. After undergoing a major operation, he died in Vienna on 12 October 1926. His body was transferred to Linz, where former officer colleagues ensured he had a dignified funeral.

== Awards and honors ==
=== Austro-Hungarian ===
- Military Merit Cross (16 April 1896)
- Order of the Iron Crown 3rd Class (12 October 1902)
- Knight's Cross of the Order of Leopold (27 April 1905)
- Order of the Iron Crown 2nd Class (2 August 1910)
- Grand Cross of the Order of the Iron Crown with War Decoration (5 October 1914)
- Cross of Merit, 1st Class, of the Decoration for Services to the Red Cross with war decoration (June 1915)
- Grand Cross of the Order of Leopold with Swords and War Decoration (7 April 1917)

Puhallo also was appointed to the Geheimrat on 30 November 1913.

=== Foreign ===
- Commander's Cross, First Class, of the Albert Order (Kingdom of Saxony, 1906)
- Grand Cross of the Order of Military Merit (Kingdom of Spain, 1906)
- Commander, First Class, of the Friedrich Order (Kingdom of Württemberg, 1907)
- Iron Cross 2nd Class (German Empire, June 1915)
- Iron Cross 1st Class with Swords (German Empire, 1917)

== Bibliography ==
- R. Egger: "Puhallo von Brlog Paul". In: Österreichisches Biographisches Lexikon 1815–1950 (ÖBL). Vol. 8, Austrian Academy of Sciences, Vienna 1983, ISBN 3-7001-0187-2, p. 328. (in German)
- Залесский К. А. Кто был кто в первой мировой войне. Биографический энциклопедический словарь. М., 2003 (in Russian)
