= 1st Army (Austria-Hungary) =

1. Armee; 1st Army
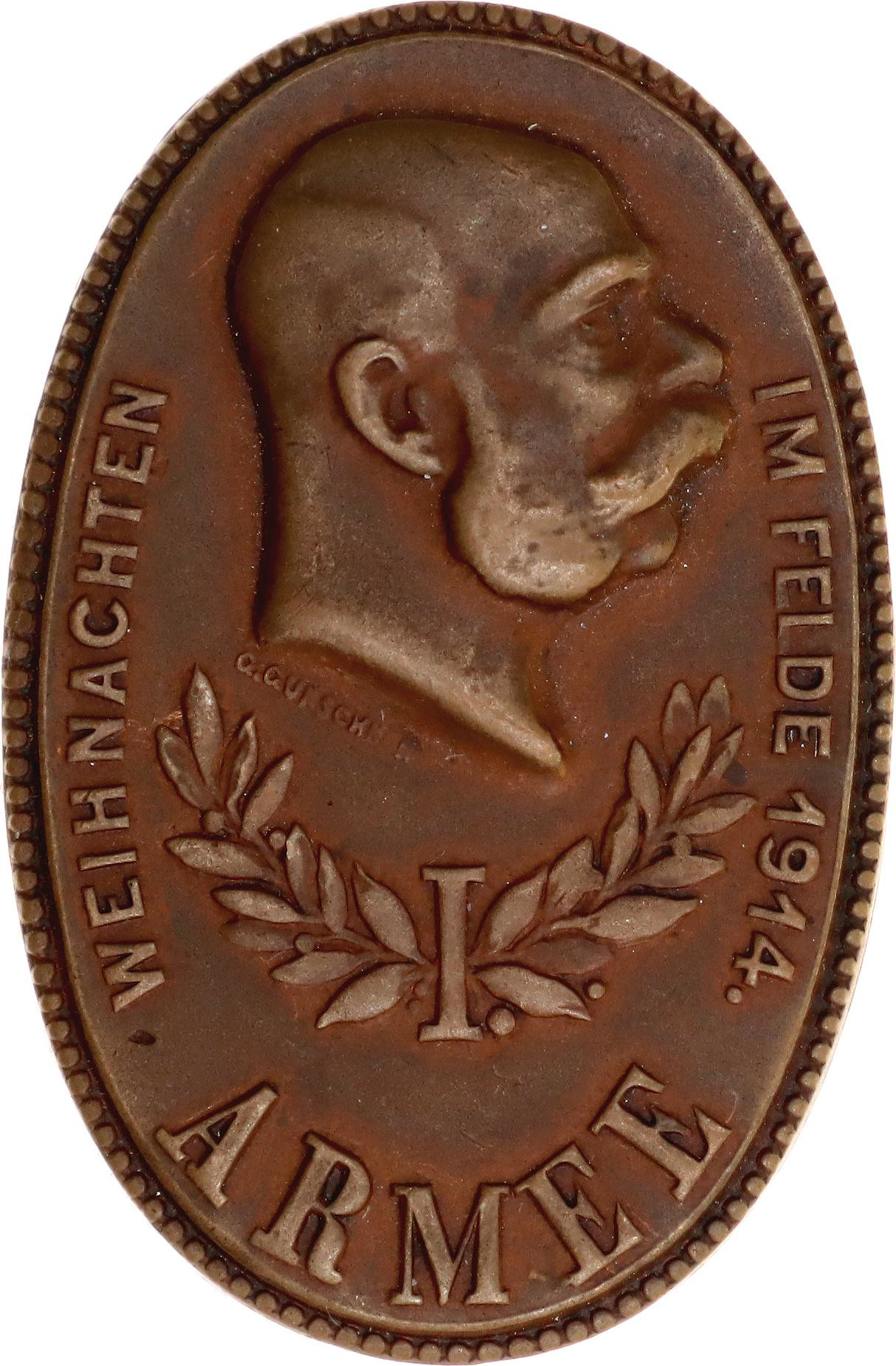
- Cap Badge
- Active: August 1914 – June 1916; August 1916 – 15 April 1918
- Country: Austria-Hungary
- Type: Field Army
- Engagements: World War I; Battle of Kraśnik; Battle of Galicia; Battle of the Vistula River; Brusilov offensive; Romanian Front; Battle of Transylvania; Third Battle of Oituz

Commanders
- Notable commanders: Viktor Dankl von Krasnik; Arthur Arz von Straussenburg

The 1st Army (German: k.u.k. 1. Armee) was a field army-level command in the ground forces of Austria-Hungary during World War I. The army fought in Galicia and Russian Poland in 1914–15 before being briefly dissolved in the summer of 1916. Shortly afterwards, it was reformed and sent to fight in the Romanian Campaign for the next two years. The 1st Army was demobilized in April 1918 due to its heavy losses, following Romania's surrender.

== History ==
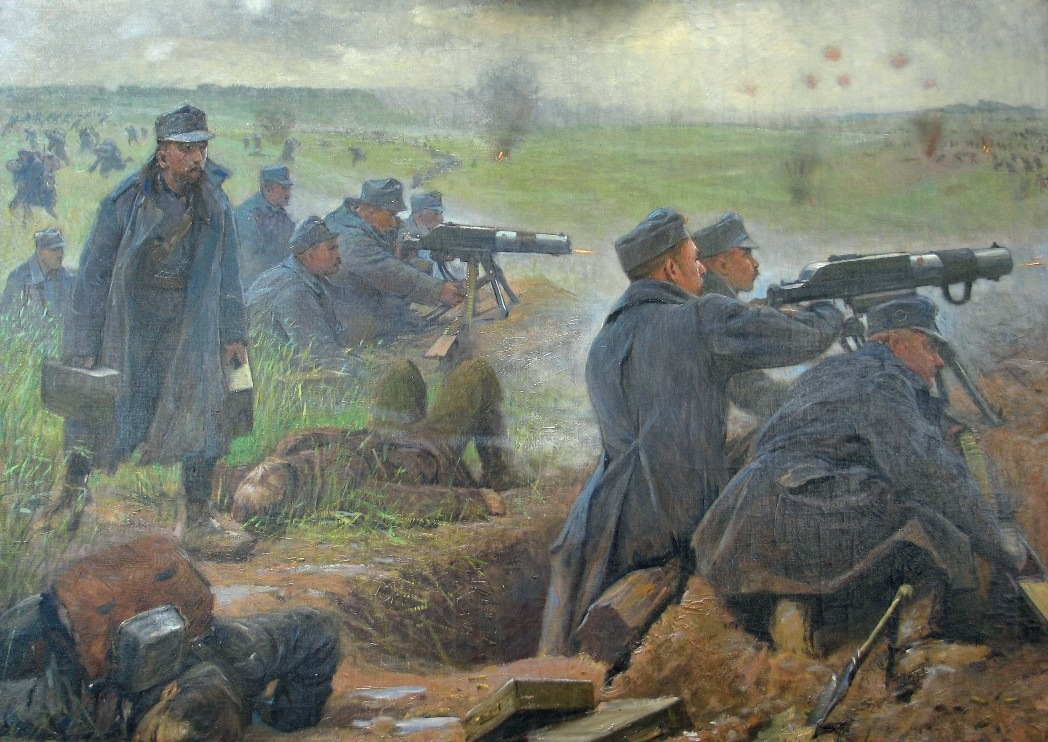
Painting depicting machine gunners of the 1st Army firing at advancing enemy forces, 1915

The 1st Army was formed in 1914 as part of Austria-Hungary's mobilization following its declaration of war on Serbia and Russia, carrying out the prewar plans for the formation of six field armies. Just as all Austro-Hungarian field armies, it consisted of a headquarters and several corps, along with some unattached units. The 1st Army was put under the command of General of the Cavalry Viktor Dankl von Krasnik and was composed of the I, V, and X Corps, originating from Kraków, Presburg and Przemyśl, respectively. Under his command, the units of the 1st Army scored the first Austro-Hungarian victory of World War I during the defense of Galicia by defeating the Russian 4th Army at the Battle of Krasnik in 23–25 August 1914. However, due to the critical situation on other parts of the front, Krasnik was forced to withdraw south along the Dunajec river to the area north of Kraków. During the winter of 1914 the 1st Army took part in the Battle of the Vistula River in Russian Poland, reaching Ivangorod. In May 1915, General Krasnik was transferred to the Italian Front. He was replaced by General of the Cavalry Karl Kirchbach auf Lauterbach for a couple of months before command of the 1st Army was given to General of the Artillery Paul Puhallo von Brlog. The 1st Army did not take part in the Gorlice–Tarnów Offensive, remaining in Volodymyr-Volynskyi during that time.

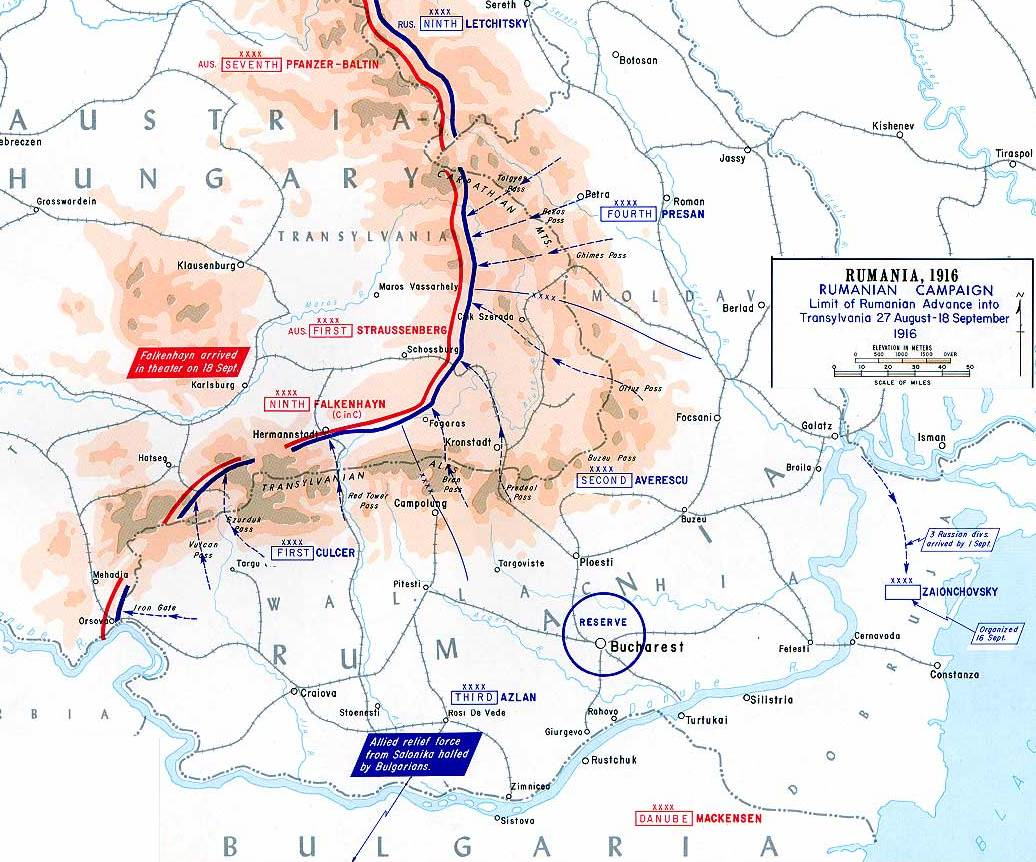
The 1st Army's position in Transylvania during the Romanian invasion, August 1916

In the aftermath of that operation the 1st Army under Puhallo seized the bridgeheads at Sandomierz and Tarlo-Jozefow, assigned to be part of Army Group Böhm-Ermolli for the first half of 1916. It was the transferred to the Bug river region and was part of Army Group Linsingen, under the overall command of August von Mackensen, but saw little action until the end of the Russian Great Retreat, at which point the front lines became static. In the summer of 1916, Puhallo and the 1st Army were forced to withdraw during the Brusilov Offensive, and according to the general staff, "the former 1st army was in the course of events dissolved on grounds of expediency and by and by divided amongst neighboring armies, the headquarters thereby becoming superfluous and was disbanded." In August, however, the 1st Army was formed once again, this time under General of the Infantry Arthur Arz von Straussenburg. Romania also entered the war on that month, and the reformed 1st Army under Straussenburg managed to hold off a Romanian assault in Transylvania on 28 August, despite its numerical inferiority. It continued to fight alongside the German 9th Army, as well as Bulgarian and Ottoman troops, over the next several months as the Central Powers entered Romania proper and occupied a large portion of it. During that time it was subordinated to Army Group Archduke Karl. When the archduke became Emperor Karl I of Austria-Hungary in November, he assigned Straussenburg to replace Franz Conrad von Hötzendorf as chief of the general staff.

As a result, Colonel General Franz Rohr von Denta became the new 1st Army commander in February 1917. The army stayed in Romania for much of the year and took part in the continued fight against the Romanian forces, subordinated to Army Front Archduke Joseph, including the Third Battle of Oituz. The actions during the summer of 1917 near Oituz, spearheaded by the VIII Corps, resulted in the Austro-Hungarian 1st Army taking significant casualties and only advancing 2-6 kilometers. In February 1918 it was subordinated to Army Front Kövess. Austro-Hungarian casualties were extremely high on the Eastern Front, and the casualty-struck 1st Army had to be disbanded on 15 April 1918, as conclusion of the peace treaty with Romania was imminent.

== Order of battle on formation ==
Upon mobilization in August 1914, the 1st Army consisted of three corps, along with three divisions and some smaller units under the direct command of the army headquarters.

Organization of 1st Army in August 1914
Army	Corps	Division
1st Army	I Corps	5th Infantry Division
1st Army	I Corps	46th Landwehr Infantry Division
1st Army	V Corps	14th Infantry Division
1st Army	V Corps	33rd Infantry Division
1st Army	V Corps	37th Honvéd Infantry Division
1st Army	X Corps	2nd Infantry Division
1st Army	X Corps	24th Infantry Division
1st Army	X Corps	45th Landwehr Infantry Division
1st Army	(Unattached)	12th Infantry Division
1st Army	(Unattached)	3rd Cavalry Division
1st Army	(Unattached)	9th Cavalry Division

== Order of battle in October 1916 ==
The 1st Army consisted of the following formations while in Romania, by late October 1916.

- XXI Corps
- VI Corps
- Group Stein
  - 71st Infantry Division
  - 1st Cavalry Division
  - 8th Bavarian Reserve Division

== Order of battle at the Third Battle of Oituz ==
By July 1917, the 1st Army in Romania was composed of the following:

- Group Gerok
  - VIII Corps
    - 70th Infantry Division
    - 71st Infantry Division
    - 117th German Infantry Division
    - 7th Cavalry Division
    - 8th Cavalry Division
- VI Corps
- Group Liposcék

== Commanders ==
The 1st Army had the following commanders until it was demobilized in 1918.

1st Army commanders
From	Rank	Name
August 1914	General of the Cavalry	Viktor Dankl von Krasnik
23 May 1915	General of the Cavalry	Karl Kirchbach auf Lauterbach
10 June 1915	General of the Artillery	Paul Puhallo von Brlog
16 August 1916	General of the Infantry	Arthur Arz von Straussenburg
February 1917	Colonel General	Franz Rohr von Denta

== Chiefs of staff ==
The 1st Army had the following chiefs of staff until it was demobilized in 1918.

1st Army chiefs of staff
From	Rank	Name
August 1914	Major General	Alfred Kochanovsky von Korwinau
April 1916	Major General	Hermann Sallagar
16 August 1916	Colonel	Josef Huber von Szekelyföld

== Books ==
- Barrett, Michael B. (2013). Prelude to Blitzkrieg: The 1916 Austro-German Campaign in Romania. Indiana University Press. ISBN 978-0253008657.
- DiNardo, Richard L. (2010). Breakthrough: The Gorlice-Tarnow Campaign, 1915. Praeger. ISBN 978-0275991104.
