= Army Group Böhm-Ermolli =

Austro-Hungarian unit (1915–1918)

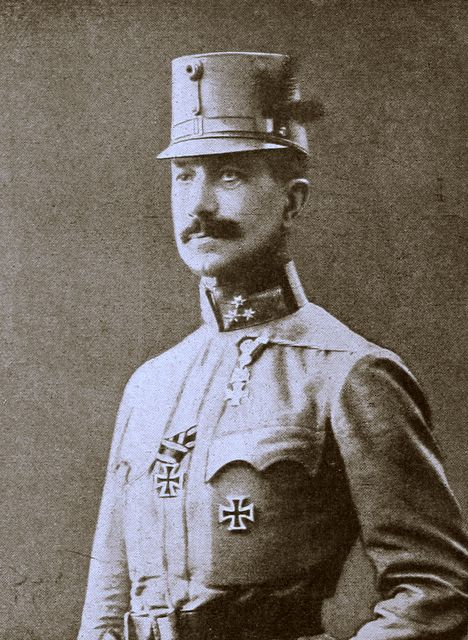
Eduard von Böhm-Ermolli

The Army Group Böhm-Ermolli (German: Heeresgruppe Böhm-Ermolli) was an Army Group of the Austro-Hungarian Army, which operated on the Eastern Front against Russia, from 19 September 1915 to 25 July 1916 and again from 4 October 1916 to 24 January 1918 during World War I. It was commanded by Eduard von Böhm-Ermolli.

== Composition September 1915 - July 1916 ==
- Austro-Hungarian 1st Army (Paul Puhallo von Brlog)
- Austro-Hungarian 2nd Army (Eduard von Böhm-Ermolli)

== Composition October 1916 - January 1918 ==
- Austro-Hungarian 2nd Army (Eduard von Böhm-Ermolli)
- German South Army (Felix Graf von Bothmer)
- Austro-Hungarian 3rd Army (Karl Graf von Kirchbach auf Lauterbach succeeded by Karl Tersztyánszky von Nádas and Karl Kritek), from July 1917.

== Sources ==
- Austro-Hungarian Army, Higher Commands and Commanders
- Deutsche biographie
