= Arthur Arz von Straußenburg =

Austro-Hungarian general

Generaloberst Freiherr Arthur Arz von Straußenburg
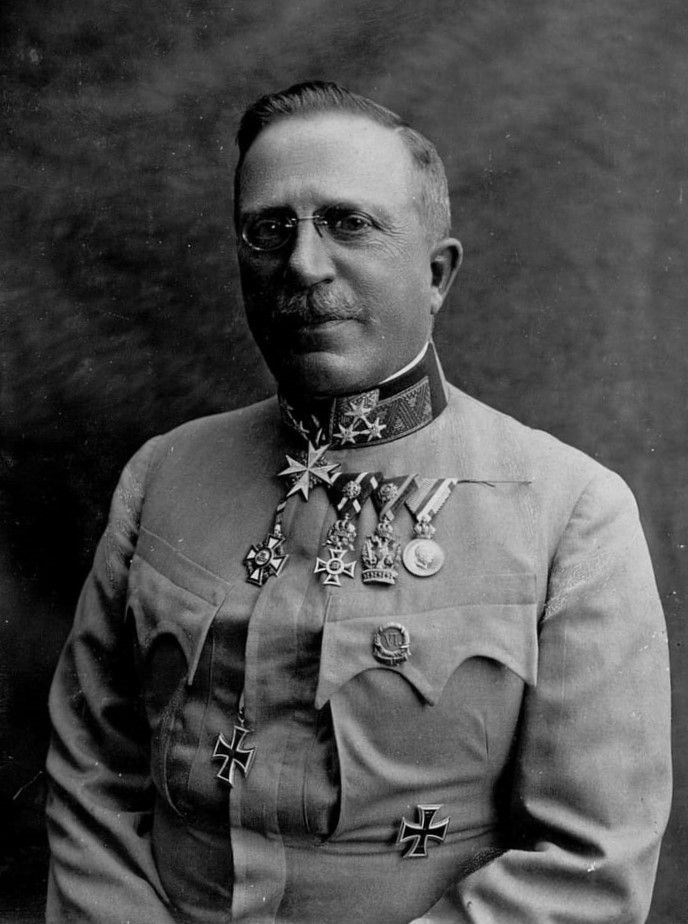
- Arz von Straußenburg in 1917

Chief of the General Staff
- In office 1 March 1917 – 3 November 1918
- Monarch: Charles I
- Preceded by: Franz Conrad von Hötzendorf
- Succeeded by: Office abolished

Deputy Supreme Commander of the Imperial and Royal Armed Forces
- In office 1 March 1917 – 3 November 1918
- Monarch: Charles I
- Supreme Commander: Hermann Kövess von Kövessháza
- Preceded by: Archduke Friedrich
- Succeeded by: Office abolished

Personal details
- Born: 16 June 1857 Hermannstadt, Austrian Empire (present-day Sibiu, Romania)
- Died: 1 July 1935 (aged 78) Budapest, Kingdom of Hungary
- Awards: Military Order of Maria Theresa; Pour le Mérite

Military service
- Allegiance: Austria-Hungary
- Branch/service: Austro-Hungarian Army
- Years of service: 1876–1918
- Rank: Generaloberst
- Unit: 15th Infantry Division; VI Corps; 1st Army
- Battles/wars: First World War; Gorlice-Tarnów Offensive; Romanian Campaign; Isonzo Front; Battle of Caporetto; Battle of the Piave River

Arthur Freiherr Arz von Straußenburg (Hungarian: báró straussenburgi Arz Artúr; 16 June 1857 – 1 July 1935) was an Austro-Hungarian colonel general and last Chief of the General Staff of the Austro-Hungarian Army. At the outbreak of the First World War, he commanded the 15th Infantry Division. Soon, he was promoted to the head of the 6th Corps and the First Army. He participated on the Gorlice–Tarnów Offensive in 1915 and the countryside of Romania in 1916. In March 1917, he became Chief of the General Staff until his resignation on 3 November 1918.

== Early life ==
Born into a Protestant family that was among the medieval Saxon settlers of east Transylvania, Arz was the product of a noble "Siebenbürger" family. His grandfather Martin Samuel Arz had been postmaster of Hermannstadt (today Sibiu) and was raised to the nobility in 1835 with the title "von Straussenburg". His father, Albert Arz von Straußenburg, served as an evangelical preacher and curate as well as a member of the House of Magnates. Schooled in Dresden and Hermannstadt, Arz graduated "with great achievement", and went on to read law at a university, during which time he volunteered for one year's service in a Hungarian Feldjäger battalion from 1876 to 1877.

== Early career ==
Having successfully completed a year's military service, Arz sat and passed the reserve officers examination and went on to apply for and successfully obtain a commission as a regular officer. In 1878, he was commissioned with the rank Leutnant.

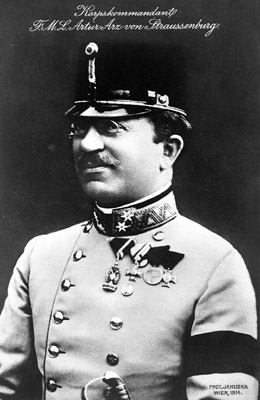
Arz as a Lieutenant-Field Marshal in 1912

Attaining the rank of Oberleutnant, Arz attended the Imperial Kriegsschule in Vienna, 1885–1887, where he again distinguished himself, and in 1888 he was appointed to the General Staff. Promoted to Hauptmann and assigned to a corps staff, Arz was made Adjutant to Feldzeugmeister Baron Schönfelda before returning to the General Staff in 1898, where he was to remain, with a few breaks, until 1908.

Promoted next to the rank of Major, then Oberstleutnant, Arz was attached to the 2nd Corps, then commanded by Archduke Eugen, following his assignment to the General Staff. On 1 May 1902 he was promoted to Oberst and appointed to the managing bureau of the General Staff, of which department he was appointed head in May 1903. The same year, he married Stefanie Tomka von Tomkahaza und Falkusfalva, a Hungarian noblewoman, with whom he had a daughter.

In 1908, Arz was again promoted, this time to the rank of Generalmajor, and was given command of the 61st Infantry Brigade. Having been steadily promoted and seen as a promising and competent officer, he received an "outstanding" evaluation from his old commander, Archduke Eugen, during 1911's fall maneuvres. 1912 saw him promoted to command a division, the 15th infantry at Miskolc. Soon afterwards Arz attained the rank of Feldmarschall-Leutnant and in 1913 was reassigned to the war ministry in Vienna to head up a section.

== First World War ==
=== The opening ===
At the outbreak of war in the Summer of 1914, Arz von Straussenburg requested a transfer to a field assignment and was again given command of the 15th infantry division, which participated in the closing stages of Komarów. Almost immediately thereafter, on 7 September, Arz was given command of the 6th corps, taking over from Boroević, who had been appointed to command the Third Army. In charge of the 6th Corps, he performed outstandingly and with great energy at Limanowa-Lapanów, where his unit formed part of the 4th Army. At Gorlice-Tarnów he was again to play an outstanding role and was in command again at Grodek-Magierow and Brest-litowsk during the summer of 1915. In September 1915, he was promoted to the rank of General der Infanterie, and having fought alongside Mackensen's 11th army he gained the respect of the Germans in his abilities as a commander.

=== The Romanian Campaign ===
With the threatened entry of Romania into the war on the Allied side, Arz was reassigned from the 6th Corps and appointed to command the newly reorganised 1st Army on 16 August 1916. Arriving at Kolozsvár (today Cluj-Napoca, Romania), where forces were being marshalled to repel an expected Romanian advance into Transylvania, he stated "I am an Army Commander without an Army". Indeed, on the Romanian declaration of war on 27 August, the 1st 'Army' comprised a mere 10,000 men (half a division). A slow Romanian advance combined with hysterical outcry from Budapest led to the 1st Army being considerably and rapidly strengthened to drive back the challenge from the south.

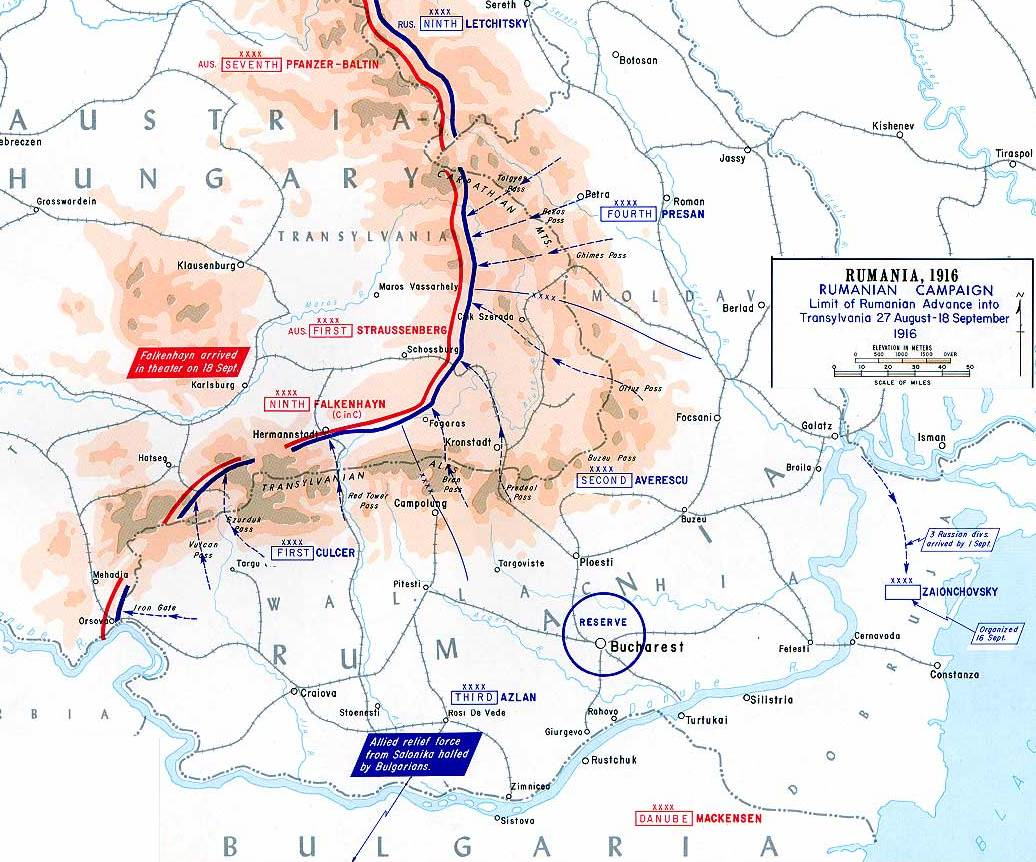
Disposition of Romanian forces in Austria-Hungary, August 1916

Romanian forces crossed the frontier on 28 August 1916 with six separate forces pushing through the six Carpathian passes to converge on Brassó (today Braşov, Romania). By 4 September they had succeeded in pushing nearly as far as Sepsiszentgyörgy in the Székely territories. In order to fend off these six separate invasions, Arz, now fighting on his home turf, ordered the 71st Infantry Division and 141st and 142nd Brigades to the sector. Simultaneously, the Romanian North Army sought to advance along the entire Moldavian front in the Eastern Carpathians, although in fact this amounted to an advance in the northern sector, where the Russian 9th Army was best placed to aid the advance. To counter this strike, Arz deployed the 16th, 19th and elements of the 61st divisions.

In cooperation with the German 9th Army, the Romanian invasion was repelled and its forces were thrown back across the border within eight weeks, leading to Arz receiving the respect and appreciation of the new Austro-Hungarian emperor, Karl I. Other commanders also hailed his achievements during the campaign, with Conrad writing that he had "proved to be an energetic resolute leader in the most difficult situations..." and Boroević stating that Arz was an "Honourable, noble character....outstanding general."

Arz was to remain in charge of the 1st Army until February 1917, after major operations in Romania ended, with help from Falkenhayn's 9th German Army and from the German Army of the Danube under Mackensen.

=== Chief of General Staff ===
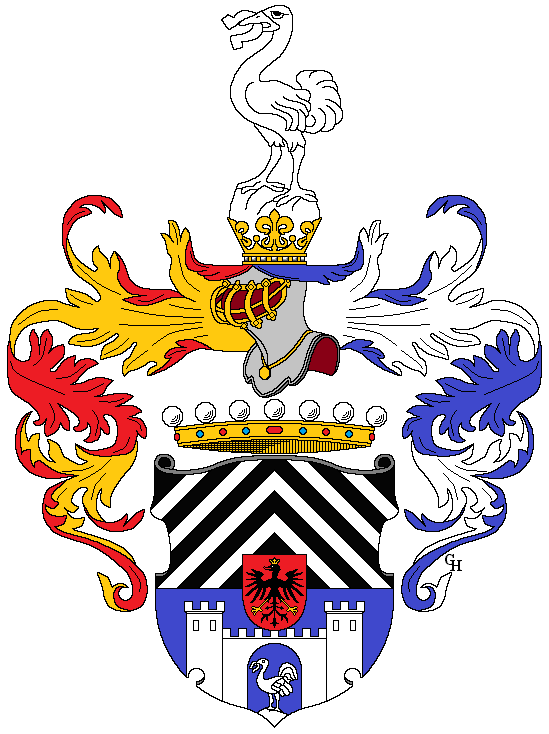
Arz von Straußenburg's coat of arms, granted in 1918

Karl I of Austria succeeded Franz Joseph as Emperor on 21 November 1916, bringing with him a wave of change across the upper echelons of the government and military command. One casualty of these changes was Conrad, with Karl reported as "not wanting a genius to command his armies", but following on from the experience of the supremely gifted but often unsuccessful Conrad, rather someone who was just capable. Arz was acquainted with the emperor; not only was he a capable commander of troops, but he also possessed a conciliatory manner which did not make the Emperor feel he was being patronised during discussions on military matters, as was the case with other commanders. Unlike Conrad, Arz was not overtly political, was wholly committed to the Central Powers, and had full faith in the Emperor.

Once appointed in March 1917, Arz made every effort to comply with the Emperor's wishes, but unlike his predecessor he acted as a personal advisor to the Emperor on army matters, rather than as a driver of his own strategy, which had been Conrad's hallmark. His tenure at the head of the army saw increasing German control over Austro-Hungarian forces and reduced independence of action, but also a number of notable victories in the spring and summer of 1917, including the clearing of Galicia and the Bukovina, as well as the breakthrough at Flitsch Tolmein and the great victory at Caporetto later in the year.

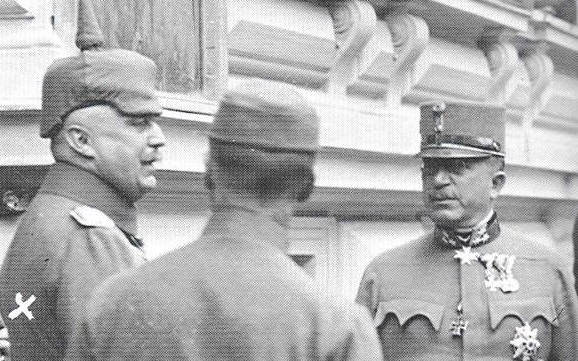
Arz (right) with Ludendorff (left) at Army Headquarters in Baden bei Wien, 1917

Promoted to the rank of Generaloberst on 26 February 1918, and also raised to the nobility early the same year, Arz was ultimately responsible for planning the invasion of Italy which was to take place during the summer of 1918, with Russia now knocked out of the war and a good number of experienced forces at his disposal. While planning was underway, both Conrad and Boroević demanded to lead the offensive, and neither Arz nor the AOK was able to make a decisive decision. Instead a compromise suggested by the Emperor was adopted, with their forces divided and sent to attack Italian positions on the front from two different directions. This resulted in the utter failure of the offensive at the Piave River in June 1918.

Arz took full responsibility for the failure of the massive invasion of Italy and tendered his resignation, but the Emperor refused to accept it, even after Generaloberst Schönburg-Hartenstein had said to the Emperor's face that the army had lost all confidence in Arz. By late October 1918, Arz could see that ultimate defeat for the Imperial forces was inevitable. He had drawn up plans for an orderly troop withdrawal in the event of an armistice, so as to prevent unnecessary further bloodshed. An armistice with Italy was concluded on 3 November 1918 and was to come into effect 36 hours later, during which time thousands of Imperial troops were captured while believing themselves to be at peace, due to poor communication from Army High Command.

=== End of the war ===
During the night of 2–3 November 1918, the Emperor relinquished command of the armed forces. In a handwritten note which can still be found in the Vienna war archives, he wrote:

Dear Generaloberst Baron Arz, I appoint you to be my supreme commander. Karl

Not wanting responsibility for handling the armistice, Arz declined the appointment, and Kövess took up appointment as commander-in-chief instead. Arz however undertook the position de facto until Field Marshal Kövess could take up his office.

== After the war ==
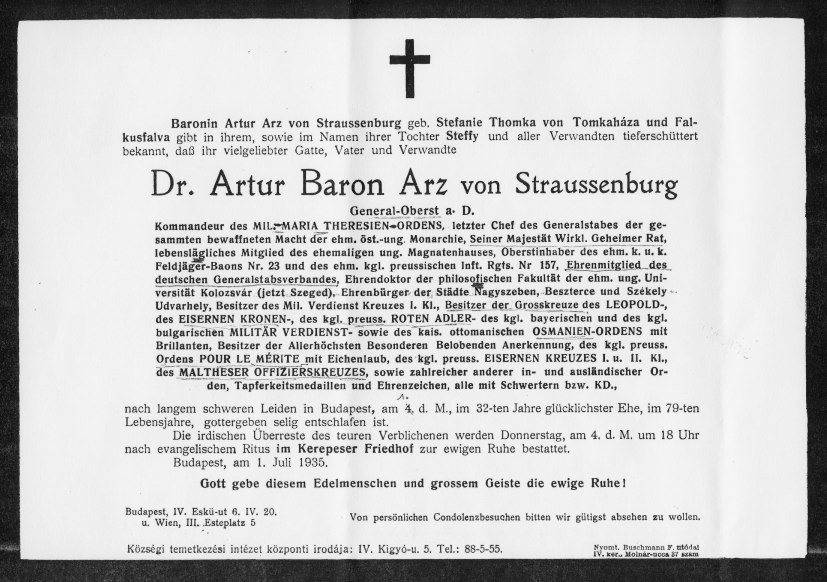
General Arz von Straußenberg's obituary, 1935

After the collapse, Arz moved to in Vienna. He was granted a civil list pension of 20 000 Krone, but because of the growing inflation and anyway being not wealthy he had soon a very bad financial situation. Moreover, he became a scapegoat in public opinion since -- next to the King -- the Chief of the General Staff was made responsible for the consequences of the armistice and the defeat of the Battle of Piave. The newly established First Austrian Republic, in spite of a new law accepted on 19 December 1918, conducted an infringement procedure against him regarding the Battle of Piave; however it ended without any result.

With Transylvania and the Bukovina awarded to Romania after the war, he became a Romanian citizen but - expecting possible retaliation - he refused to return to his home in a country whose defeat he had played a significant role in only a few years earlier. Although from January 1921 the Romanian state had granted his pension, in 1923, due to the intervention of Ion I. C. Brătianu, the Romanian legislature passed a new law which denied a pension to those former Imperial and Royal military personnel officially resident in Transylvania, Banat and Bukovina who were not living in Romania.

Living in poverty, he applied - as well in the name of 72 fellow officers - for relief to the Hungarian Prime Minister István Bethlen, who denied his submission. He survived on stipends from a support fund organized by former Imperial and Royal comrades to help officers in such situations. In 1924 he published his memoirs. In 1926, the Hungarian government granted him a pension, back dated from 1 November 1925. After this the former support fund was transformed into the "Funds of the former General Staff". From 1931 on, the Hungarian Parliament required all pensioners to be habitually residing in Budapest; so in 1932, he officially moved to the city, but he did not entirely vacate Vienna and continued to stay there recurrently.

He applied for and was granted Hungarian citizenship in 1933. In 1935, Arz wrote of his experiences during the war. His work, unlike those of many of his contemporaries, contained no element of self-justification or political statement.

On 1 July 1935, during a visit to Budapest to collect his pension, he suffered a heart attack and died. He was buried with the highest military honours at the Kerepesi cemetery in Budapest.

== Service record ==
- May 1902 – Promoted to Oberst
- May 1903 – Chairman of the Management Bureau until November 1908
- November 1908 – Promoted to Generalmajor
- November 1908 – Commands 61st Infantry Brigade until April 1912
- April 1912 – Commands 15th Infantry Division until April 1913
- May 1912 – Promoted to Feldmarschalleutnant
- April 1913 – Section chief of all military Departments in the War Ministry until September 1914
- September 1914 – Commands 15th Infantry Division until end of the month
- September 1914 – Commands VI Corps until August 1916
- September 1915 – Promoted to General der Infanterie
- August 1916 – Commands 1st Army until February 1917
- March 1917 – Chief of the General Staff until November 1918
- February 1918 – Promoted to Generaloberst

== Awards ==
- Arz received a number of awards from the Habsburg monarchy, including, most importantly, appointment to the grade of Commander of the Military Order of Maria Theresa. He also received the Pour le Mérite from the German Empire

== Works ==
- Arz von Straussenburg, A., The History of the Great War 1914–1918 (Vienna, 1924)
- Arz von Straussenburg, A., Fight and Fall of the Empires (Vienna and Leipzig, 1935)

== Sources ==
- Pope, S. & Wheal, E., The Macmillan Dictionary of the First World War (London: Macmillan, 1997)
- Austro-Hungarian Army - Generaloberst Arthur Freiherr Arz von Straussenburg at www.austro-hungarian-army.co.uk

Military offices
Preceded by Franz Conrad von Hötzendorf	Chief of the General Staff; 1 March 1917 – November 1918	Succeeded by Dissolved
Preceded by Paul Puhallo von Brlog	Commander, 1st Army; 16 August 1916 - February 1917	Succeeded by Franz Rohr von Denta
