= Artur von Mecenseffy =

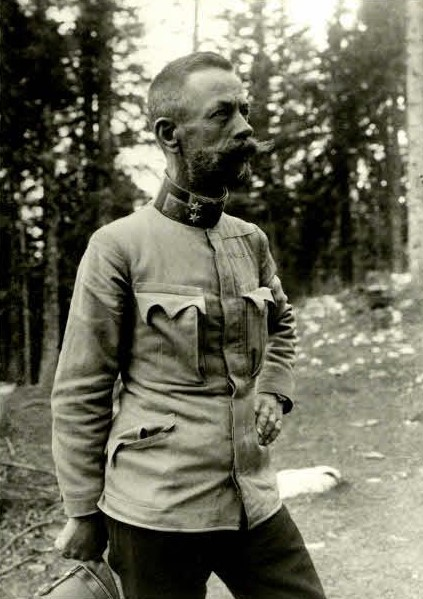
- Born: Artur Edler von Mecenseffy; 23 June 1865; Vienna, Austrian Empire
- Died: 6 October 1917 (aged 52); Asiago, Kingdom of Italy
- Military career
- Allegiance: Austria-Hungary
- Branch: Austro-Hungarian Army
- Service years: 1882–1917
- Rank: Feldmarschall-Leutnant (Lieutenant field marshal)
- Commands: 10th Infantry Division; 6th Infantry Division
- Conflicts: World War I: Eastern Front; Gorlice–Tarnów Offensive; Italian Front; Battle of Asiago

Artur Edler von Mecenseffy (23 June 1865 – 6 October 1917) was an Austro-Hungarian Army officer who held the rank of Feldmarschall-leutnant ("lieutenant field marshal") and served during World War I, becoming the highest-ranking officer of Austria-Hungary to be killed on the battlefield.

== Biography ==
Born in 1865 in Vienna, he joined an engineering regiment of the Austro-Hungarian Army in 1882 and would become a second lieutenant three years later. Mecenseffy graduated from the War Academy and in 1895 was transferred to the operations section of the Austro-Hungarian General Staff, while being a captain. In 1907 Mecenseffy was part of the group that worked on the "Plan U" which prepared for a possible occupation of the Habsburg Kingdom of Hungary in case of a rebellion. In 1909, he became head of the supply section of the General Staff and was promoted to major general in 1912, being given command of the 18th Infantry Brigade.

When World War I broke out in August 1914, Mecenseffy served as the chief of staff for the 2nd Army when it was initially deployed to be used against Serbia. However, when it was transferred to the Eastern Front in October, he was removed from the position due to disagreements with the army commander Eduard von Böhm-Ermolli and made supply chief of the 4th Army. In either December 1914 or January 1915 he was made commander of the 10th Infantry Division. His unit saw action in the Gorlice–Tarnów Offensive against the Russian Empire, taking part in defending the flank of 3rd Army as it advanced towards Przemyśl fortress, before being transferred to the Italian Front, where it was also involved in heavy fighting. In September 1916 he replaced Rudolf Müller as the commander of 6th Infantry Division. His new unit held the line near Vil Sugana valley (Trentino) in the mountains, repulsing Italian attempts at breaking through.

In October 1917, he was inspecting the front line trenches when his position was hit by an Italian artillery shell, killing him. On the personal insistence of the former Chief of the General Staff, Franz Conrad von Hötzendorf, his body was returned to his family in Vienna. A memorial was built for him near the place that he died.

== Sources ==
=== Books ===
- Cavallaro, Gaetano V. (2010). The Beginning of Futility. Xlibris. ISBN 978-1401084264.
