= Generaloberst =

Police and armed forces rank

A Generaloberst ("colonel general") was the second-highest general officer rank in the Imperial German Army, the Reichswehr and Wehrmacht, the Austro-Hungarian Common Army, the East German National People's Army, and in German and Austrian police services. The rank was equal to a four-star full general but below a Generalfeldmarschall. The rank was equivalent to a Generaladmiral in the Kriegsmarine until 1945 or to a Flottenadmiral in the Volksmarine until 1990. It was the highest ordinary military rank and the highest military rank awarded in peacetime; the higher rank of general field marshal was awarded only in wartime by the head of state. In general, a Generaloberst had the same privileges as a general field marshal.

A literal translation of Generaloberst would be "uppermost general", but it is often translated as "colonel-general" by analogy to Oberst, "colonel", such as in countries in which the rank was adopted like Russia (Russian: генерал-полковник, romanized: general-polkovnik). "Oberst" derives from the superlative form of Germanic ober (upper), cognate to English over and so "superior general" might be a more idiomatic rendering.

The rank was created in 1854, originally for then-Prince Wilhelm of Prussia, future King of Prussia and later German Emperor, because members of the royal family were traditionally not promoted to the rank of field marshal and it was limited to wartime. In the 19th century, the rank was largely honorary and usually held only by members of the princely families or the Governor of Berlin. The regular promotion of professional officers to the grade did not begin until 1911.

Since the rank of Generalfeldmarschall was reserved for wartime promotions, the additional distinction of a "Colonel general with the rank of field marshal" (Generaloberst im Range eines Generalfeldmarschalls) was created. Such generals were entitled to wear three pips and a marshal's crossed batons on their shoulder boards, compared to the three pips of a Colonel General; however, this was changed to four pips in 1911.

Generaloberst was the second-highest general officer rank, below field marshal, in the Prussian Army as well as in the German Empire (1871–1918), the Weimar Republic (1921–1933), the Wehrmacht (which included the Luftwaffe, established in 1935) of Nazi Germany (1933–1945) and the East German Nationale Volksarmee (1949–1991). As military ranks were often used for other uniformed services, the rank was also used by the Waffen-SS and the Ordnungspolizei of Nazi Germany and the Volkspolizei and Stasi of East Germany. In East Germany, the rank was junior to the general of the army (Armeegeneral), as well as to the briefly-extant and never-awarded rank of Marschall der DDR.

== Austro-Hungarian Army ==
gorget patch Generaloberst of the k.u.k. Common Army

In 1915 the Generaloberst – Vezérezredes rank was introduced to the Austro-Hungarian Common Army. It was the second highest behind the Feldmarschall – Tábornagy rank.

See also

1. Erzherzog Joseph Ferdinand von Österreich-Toskana (1872–1942)
2. Friedrich Graf von Beck-Rzikowsky (1830–1920)
3. Eduard Graf Paar (1837–1919)
4. Arthur Freiherr von Bolfras (1838–1922)
5. Friedrich Freiherr von Georgi (1852–1926)
6. Karl Freiherr von Pflanzer-Baltin (1855–1925)
7. Viktor Graf Dankl von Krasnik (1854–1941)
8. Karl Tersztyánszky von Nádas (1854–1921)
9. Adolf von Rhemen (1855–1932)
10. Paul Freiherr Puhallo von Brlog (1856–1926)
11. Erzherzog Leopold Salvator von Österreich-Toskana (1863–1931)
12. Karl Graf von Kirchbach auf Lauterbach (1856–1939)
13. Karl Georg Graf Huyn (1857–1938)
14. Hermann Kusmanek von Burgneustädten (1860–1934)
15. Karl Křitek (1861–1928)
16. Wenzel Freiherr von Wurm (1859–1921)
17. Samuel Freiherr von Hazai (1851–1942)
18. Leopold Freiherr von Hauer (1854–1933)
19. Viktor Graf von Scheuchenstuel (1857–1938)
20. Stephan Freiherr Sarkotić von Lovčen (1858–1939)
21. Josef Freiherr Roth von Limanowa-Łapanów (1859–1927)
22. Arthur Freiherr Arz von Straußenburg (1857–1935)
23. Hugo Martiny von Malastów (1860–1940)
24. Rudolf Freiherr Stöger-Steiner von Steinstätten (1861–1921)
25. Alois Fürst Schönburg-Hartenstein (1858–1944)

== German Empire ==
Rank insignia of the German Empire 1871 until 1918, here Shoulder board of the German Imperial Army: twisted of silver- and golden-braids with three stars to "Colonel general"

Generaloberst (1871–1918)

Colonel General with the rank of Field Marshal

=== Bavarian Army ===
- December 27, 1911 – Carl von Horn (1847–1923), Minister of War
- August 1, 1914 – Otto Kreß von Kressenstein (1850–1929), Minister of War
- April 9, 1918 – Felix von Bothmer (1852–1937), commander-in chief in WW I

=== Prussian Army ===
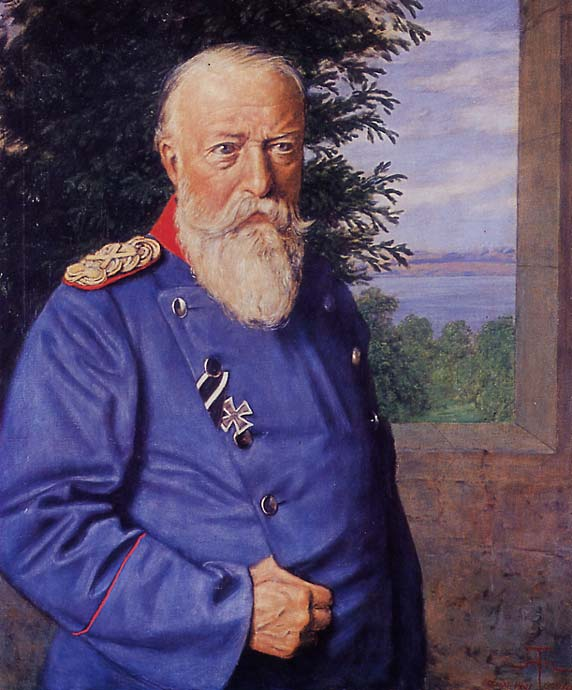
Frederick I, Grand Duke of Baden as Prussian Generaloberst (with the special rank GFM)

- March 20, 1854 – Wilhelm of Preußen (1797–1888), with the special rank of Generalfeldmarschall
- September 2, 1873 – August Prinz von Württemberg (1813–1885), Commander and Governor of Berlin
- June 25, 1888 – Frederick I, Grand Duke of Baden (1826–1907), with the special rank of Generalfeldmarschall, Inspector of the Army
- September 19, 1888 – Alexander August Wilhelm von Pape (1813–1895), with the special rank of Generalfeldmarschall, Commander in den Marken and Governor of Berlin
- December 21, 1889 – Charles Alexander, Grand Duke of Saxe-Weimar-Eisenach (1818–1901)
- March 20, 1890 – Otto von Bismarck (1815–1898), with the special rank of Generalfeldmarschall à la suite of the Army, 1st Chancellor of Germany
- October 18, 1901 – Leopold, Prince of Hohenzollern (1835–1905)
- March 22, 1902 – Adolphe, Grand Duke of Luxembourg (1817–1905)
- September 15, 1905 – Bernhard III, Duke of Saxe-Meiningen (1851–1928), with the special rank of Generalfeldmarschall, Inspector of the Army
- September 15, 1905 – Frederick II, Grand Duke of Baden (1857–1928), with the special rank of Generalfeldmarschall, Inspector of the Army
- September 13, 1906 – Ernst Rudolf Max Edler von der Planitz (1836–1910), Inspector General of the Cavalry
- September 28, 1907 – Ernst I, Duke of Saxe-Altenburg (1826–1908), with the special rank of Generalfeldmarschall of the Prussian Army
- September 18, 1908 – Hans von Plessen (1841–1929), with the special rank of Generalfeldmarschall, Adjutant General of the Kaiser and Commander of the Großes Hauptquartier ("Great Headquarters")
- 4. September 4, 1909 – Prince Henry of Prussia (1862–1929), with the special rank of Generalfeldmarschall, Großadmiral, Inspector general of the Navy, à la suite of the Prussian Army
- September 10, 1910 – Prince Friedrich Leopold of Prussia (1865–1931), à la suite
- January 22, 1911 – Prince Christian of Schleswig-Holstein (1831–1917), à la suite
- January 27, 1911 – Gustav von Kessel (1846–1918), Adjutant General of the Kaiser, Commander in the Marken, and Governor of Berlin
- September 13, 1912 – Karl von Bülow (1846–1921), Army Commander, promoted to Generalfeldmarschal in 1915
- January 1, 1913 – Hermann von Eichhorn (1848–1918) Army Group Commander, promoted to Generalfeldmarschal in 1917
- June 16, 1913 – Maximilian von Prittwitz (1848–1917), Army Commander
- June 16, 1913 – Friedrich von Scholl (1846–1928), Adjutant General of the Kaiser
- January 27, 1914 – Josias von Heeringen (1850–1926), Army Commander
- January 27, 1914 – Helmuth von Moltke the Younger (1848–1916), Chief of the 1st Oberste Heeresleitung
- January 27, 1914 – Alexander von Kluck (1846–1934), Army Commander
- December 3, 1914 – August von Mackensen (1849–1945), Army Commander, promoted to Generalfeldmarschal in 1915
- December 3, 1914 – Remus von Woyrsch (1847–1920), Army Group Commander, promoted to Generalfeldmarschal in 1917
- December 24, 1914 – Moritz von Bissing (1844–1917), Governor general of Belgium
- December 24, 1914 – Ludwig von Falkenhausen (1844–1936), Army Commander
- January 27, 1915 – Karl von Einem (1853–1934), Army Commander
- February 20, 1916 – Alexander von Linsingen (1850–1935), Army Commander
- January 27, 1917 – Günther Graf von Kirchbach (1850–1925), Commander of Heeresgruppe Kiew
- January 27, 1917 – Richard von Schubert (1850–1933), Army Commander
- January 27, 1918 – Hans von Beseler (1850–1921), Army Commander
- March 22, 1918 – Max von Boehn (1850–1921), Army Group Commander
- April 10, 1918 – Moriz Freiherr von Lyncker (1853–1932), Chief of the Military Cabinet

=== Royal Saxon Army ===
- December 21, 1889 – Carl Alexander Großherzog of Sachsen (1818–1901)
- September 15, 1905 – Bernhard Erbprinz of Sachsen-Meiningen (1851–1928)
- September 28, 1907 – Ernst I, Duke of Saxe-Altenburg (1826–1908)
- September 4, 1909 – Prince Henry of Prussia (1862–1929)
- December 17, 1910 – Max Freiherr of Hausen (1846–1922), Minister-President, Army Commander
- January 23, 1918 – Karl Ludwig d'Elsa (1849–1922), Army Commander
- January 23, 1918 – Hans von Kirchbach (1849–1928), Army Commander

=== Army of Württemberg ===
- February 25, 1913 – Philipp Herzog von Württemberg (1838–1917), à la suite of the Army of Württemberg
- September 24, 1913 – Albrecht Herzog von Württemberg (1865–1939), later also Prussian Generalfeldmarschall
- February 25, 1918 – Otto von Marchtaler (1854–1920), Minister of War

== Weimar Republic ==
=== Reichswehr ===
- January 1, 1926 – Hans von Seeckt (1866–1936), Chief of the Heeresleitung
- January 1, 1930 – Wilhelm Heye (1869–1947), Chief of the Heeresleitung
- 1934 – Kurt Freiherr von Hammerstein-Equord (1878–1943), Chief der Heeresleitung

== Nazi Germany ==
=== Wehrmacht ===
Colonel General Generaloberst
- Arabesque

- Army shoulder board and flecktarn suit insignia
- Country: Nazi Germany
- Service branch: German Army; Luftwaffe
- Formation: 20 April 1936
- Abolished: 1945
- Next higher rank: Generalfeldmarschall
- Next lower rank: General der Waffengattung
- Equivalent ranks: See list

The equivalent ranks of a colonel general were in the:

- Kriegsmarine – Generaladmiral
- Waffen-SS – SS-Oberst-Gruppenführer und Generaloberst der Waffen-SS
- Schutzstaffel (SS) – Oberst-Gruppenführer
- Sturmabteilung (SA) – No equivalent
- Ordnungspolizei (Orpo) – Generaloberst der Polizei ("Colonel general of police")

==== Heer ====
1. August 31, 1933 – Werner von Blomberg (1878–1946)
2. January 1, 1934 – Kurt Freiherr von Hammerstein-Equord (1878–1943)
3. April 20, 1936 – Werner Freiherr von Fritsch (1880–1939)
4. April 20, 1936 – Hermann Göring (1893-1946)
5. February 1, 1938 – Walther von Brauchitsch (1881–1948)
6. March 1, 1938 – Gerd von Rundstedt (1875–1953)
7. March 1, 1938 – Wilhelm Ritter von Leeb (1876–1956)
8. March 1, 1938 – Fedor von Bock (1880–1945)
9. November 1, 1938 – Ludwig Beck (1880–1944)
10. November 1, 1938 – Wilhelm Keitel (1882–1946)
11. January 1, 1939 – Wilhelm Adam (general) (1877–1949)
12. April 1, 1939 – Wilhelm List (1880–1971)
13. October 1, 1939 – Günther von Kluge (1882–1944)
14. October 1, 1939 – Johannes Blaskowitz (1883–1948)
15. October 1, 1939 – Walter von Reichenau (1884–1942)
16. November 1, 1939 – Erwin von Witzleben (1881–1944)
17. July 19, 1940 – Franz Halder (1884–1972)
18. July 19, 1940 – Friedrich Dollmann (1882–1944)
19. July 19, 1940 – Ewald von Kleist (1881–1954)
20. July 19, 1940 – Maximilian von Weichs (1881–1954)
21. July 19, 1940 – Georg von Küchler (1881–1968)
22. July 19, 1940 – Eugen Ritter von Schobert (1883–1941)
23. July 19, 1940 – Erich Hoepner (1886–1944)
24. July 19, 1940 – Heinz Guderian (1888–1954)
25. July 19, 1940 – Hermann Hoth (1885–1971)
26. July 19, 1940 – Adolf Strauß (1879–1973)
27. July 19, 1940 – Ernst Busch (1885–1945)
28. July 19, 1940 – Nikolaus von Falkenhorst (1885–1968)
29. July 19, 1940 – Curt Haase (1881–1943)
30. July 19, 1940 – Friedrich Fromm (1888–1945)
31. January 1, 1942 – Rudolf Schmidt (1886–1957)
32. February 1, 1942 – Erwin Rommel (1891–1944)
33. February 1, 1942 – Walter Model (1891–1945)
34. March 7, 1942 – Erich von Manstein (1887–1973)
35. March 16, 1942 – Georg-Hans Reinhardt (1887–1963)
36. June 1, 1942 – Richard Ruoff (1883–1967)
37. June 1, 1942 – Eduard Dietl (1890–1944)
38. November 30, 1942 – Friedrich Paulus (1890–1957)
39. December 3, 1942 – Hans-Jürgen von Arnim (1889–1962)
40. January 1, 1943 – Hans von Salmuth (1888–1962)
41. January 30, 1943 – Gotthard Heinrici (1886–1971)
42. January 30, 1943 – Walter Heitz (1878–1944)
43. July 6, 1943 – Eberhard von Mackensen (1889–1969)
44. September 1, 1943 – Heinrich von Vietinghoff (1887–1952)
45. September 1, 1943 – Karl-Adolf Hollidt (1891–1985)
46. February 1, 1944 – Alfred Jodl (1890–1946)
47. February 1, 1944 – Erwin Jaenecke (1890–1960)
48. February 1, 1944 – Walter Weiß (1890–1967)
49. February 1, 1944 – Kurt Zeitzler (1895–1963)
50. March 1, 1944 – Ferdinand Schörner (1892–1973)
51. April 1, 1944 – Lothar Rendulic (1887–1971)
52. April 1, 1944 – Hans-Valentin Hube (1890–1944)
53. April 20, 1944 – Josef Harpe (1887–1968)
54. July 1, 1944 – Johannes Frießner (1892–1971)
55. September 20, 1944 – Erhard Raus (1889–1956)
56. May 1, 1945 – Carl Hilpert (1888–1947)

==== Luftwaffe ====
Luftwaffe rank insignia

Collar patches

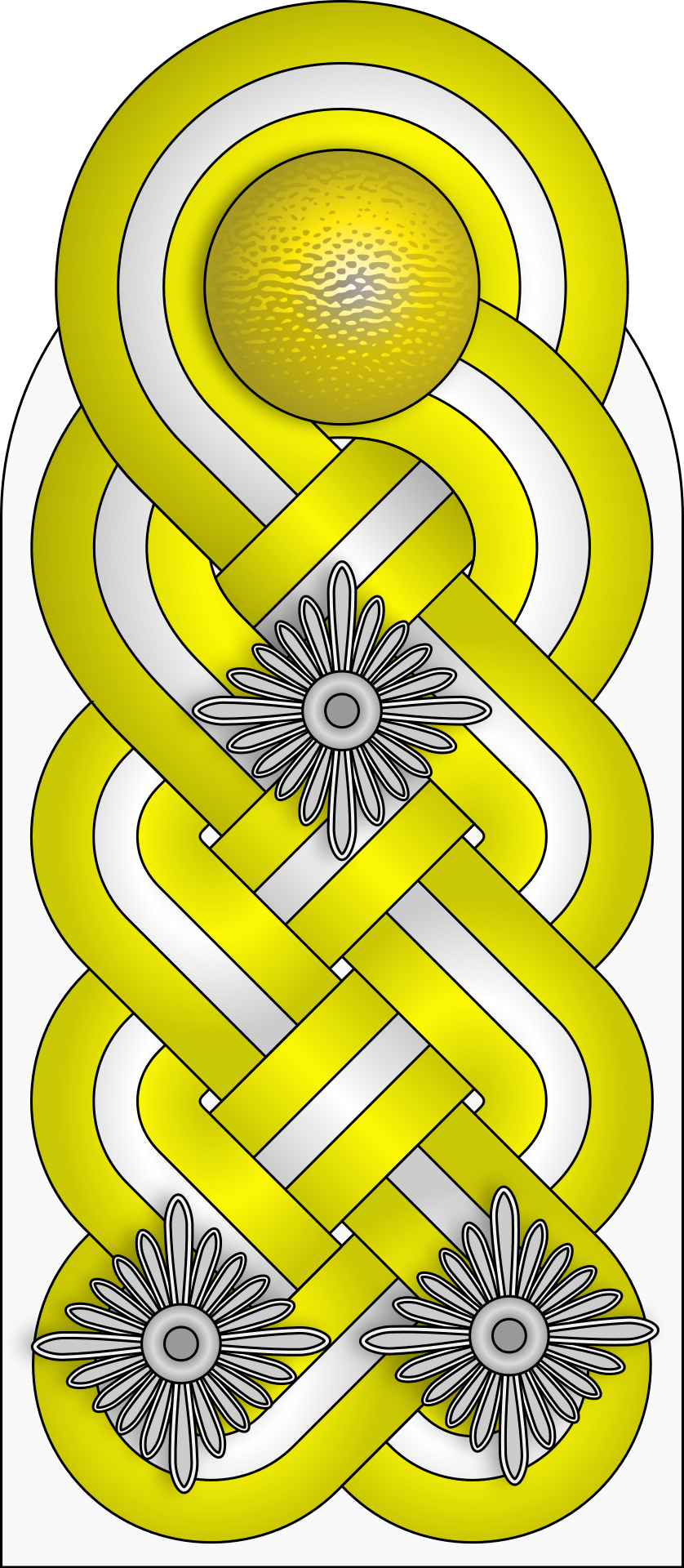
Shoulder board

on flying suit

Generaloberst Luftwaffe
1. April 20, 1936 – Hermann Göring (1893–1946)
2. November 1, 1938 – Erhard Milch (1892–1972)
3. July 19, 1940 – Ulrich Grauert (1889–1941)
4. July 19, 1940 – Hans-Jürgen Stumpff (1889–1968)
5. July 19, 1940 – Ernst Udet (1896–1941)
6. July 19, 1940 – Hubert Weise (1885–1944)
7. July 19, 1940 – Alfred Keller (1882–1974)
8. May 3, 1941 – Alexander Löhr (1885–1947)
9. February 1, 1942 – Wolfram Freiherr von Richthofen (1895–1945)
10. April 1, 1942 – Hans Jeschonnek (1899–1943)
11. November 1, 1942 – Günther Rüdel (1883–1950)
12. February 16, 1943 – Bruno Loerzer (1891–1960)
13. February 16, 1943 – Robert Ritter von Greim (1892–1945)
14. March 1, 1944 – Otto Deßloch (1889–1952)
15. July 13, 1944 – Kurt Student (1890–1978)
16. July 22, 1944 (Posthumous) – Günther Korten (1909–1944)

=== Waffen-SS ===
Rank insignia Waffen-SS

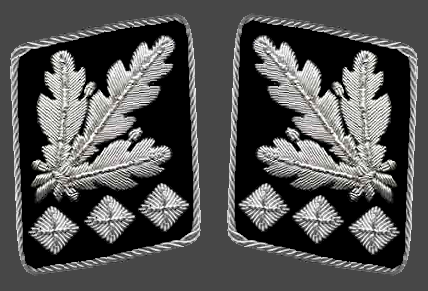
Gorget patches

Shoulder strap

camouflage

Uniform colour Feldgrau (Waffen-SS)

SS-Oberst-Gruppenführer and Generaloberst of the Waffen-SS:

- 1942 – Sepp Dietrich (1892–1966)
- 1944 – Paul Hausser (1880–1972)

=== German Police ===
Rank insignia police 1936–1945

Gorget patche 1936–42

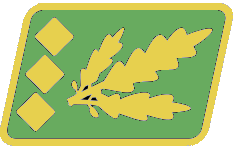
Gorget patche 1942–45

Shoulder strap

Generaloberst of the Police

SS-Oberst-Gruppenführer and Generaloberst of the Police:

- 1942 – Kurt Daluege (1897–1946)

== German Democratic Republic (East Germany) ==
Rank insignia

Arabesque

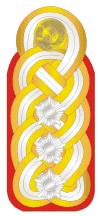
Epaulette

Generaloberst Land forces

=== National People's Army ===
In the Land Forces and Air Forces of the National People's Army, as well as the Border Troops of the German Democratic Republic Generaloberst was in line to Soviet military doctrine third general officer rank in that particular general's rank group. The equivalent to the Generaloberst was Admiral of the Volksmarine .

See also

- Ranks of the National People's Army

Preceded by Junior rank Generalleutnant	(NPA rank); Generaloberst	Succeeded by Senior rank Armeegeneral

1. March 1, 1966 Kurt Wagner (1904–1989)
2. March 1, 1972 Herbert Scheibe (1914–1991)
3. March 1, 1976 Horst Stechbarth (1925–2016)
4. October 7, 1977 Werner Fleißner (1922–1985)
5. July 14, 1979 Erich Peter (1919–1987)
6. October 7, 1979 Wolfgang Reinhold (1923–2012)
7. October 7, 1979 Fritz Streletz (1926–2025)
8. March 1, 1986 Joachim Goldbach (1929–2008)
9. March 1, 1987 Horst Brünner (1929–2008)
10. October 7, 1988 Klaus-Dieter Baumgarten (1931–2008)
11. October 7, 1989 Fritz Peter (born 1927)

=== Ministry of State Security ===
1. February 1980 Bruno Beater (1914–1982)
2. May 1986 Markus Wolf (1923–2006)
3. February 1987 Rudi Mittig (1925–1994)
4. 1989 Werner Großmann (1929–2022)

=== Deutsche Volkspolizei (DVP) ===
1. 1962 Karl Maron (1903–1975)
2. 1987 Karl-Heinz Wagner (1928–2011)

== See also ==
- Colonel general
- List of German colonel generals
- Comparative military ranks of World War I
- Comparative military ranks of World War II
- Ranks of the National People's Army

== Sources ==
- Hürter, Johannes (1 January 2007). Hitlers Heerführer: Die deutschen Oberbefehlshaber im Krieg gegen die Sowjetunion 1941/42. Walter de Gruyter. ISBN 978-3-486-70744-1.
