= Karl Graf von Kirchbach auf Lauterbach =

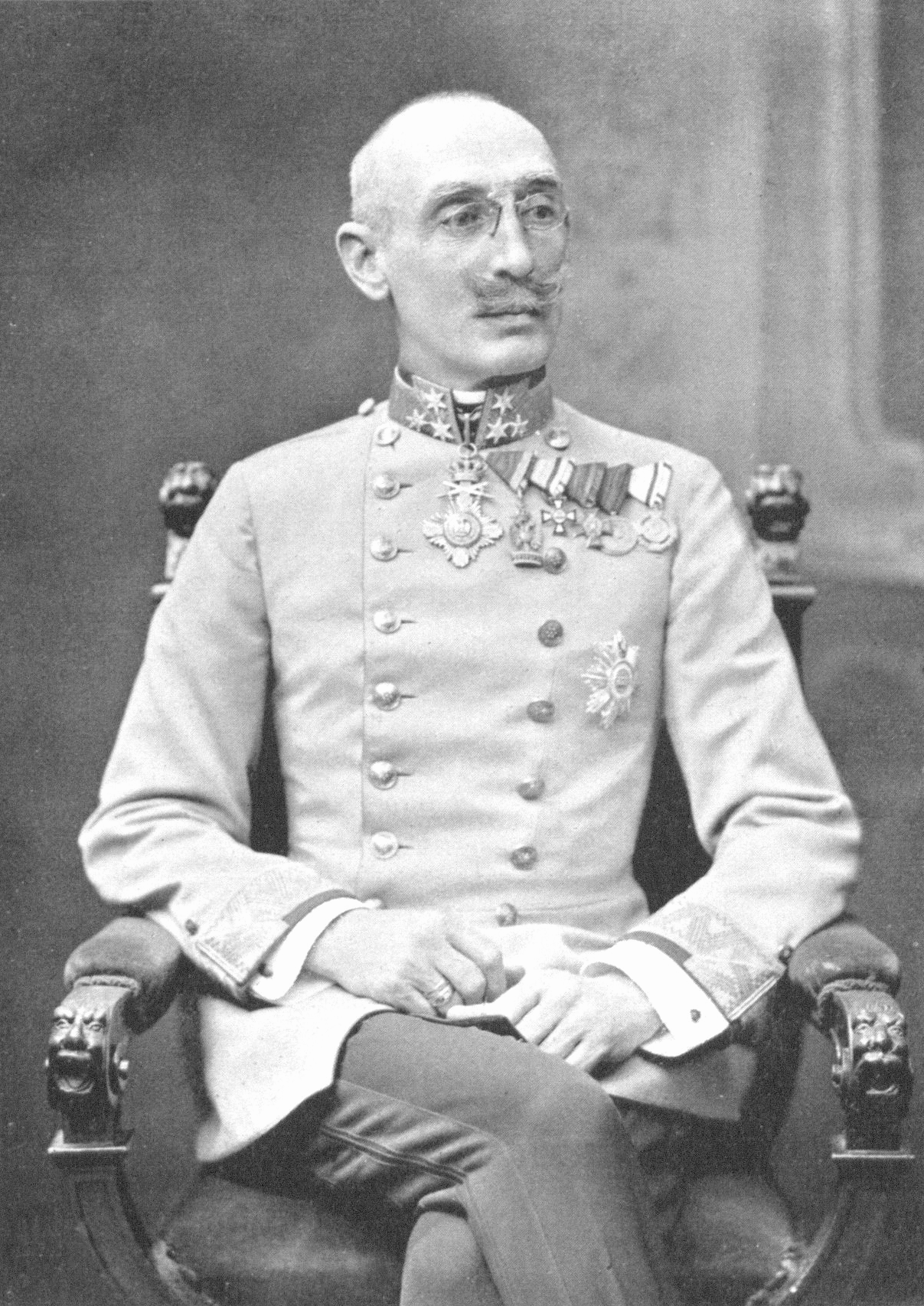
Karl von Kirchbach auf Lauterbach in summer 1914

Karl Freiherr von Kirchbach auf Lauterbach (20 May 1856 – 20 May 1939), from 1917 Count of Kirchbach auf Lauterbach, was a colonel general of the Austro-Hungarian Army.

== Biography ==
Karl von Kirchbach auf Lauterbach was born on 20 May 1856 in Gyöngyös, Hungary as the eldest son of Feldmarschallleutnant Ferdinand Freiherr von Kirchbach. Together with his younger brother Johann Ferdinand, he was destined to pursue a military career, in order to live up to the family tradition.

At the start of the First World War, Kirchbach had reached the rank of General of the Cavalry, took over the I Corps and was the commanding general in Kraków. His corps advanced on the left flank of Viktor Dankl von Krasnik's 1st Army at the beginning of the offensive against Russia. During the August fighting his I Corps, operating north of the Tanew, contributed decisively to the victory at Kraśnik. When Dankl's army was forced to retreat during the Battle of the Vistula River in October, his corps reached Ivangorod and Kirchbach temporarily took over command of an army group south of the Vistula. In the aftermath of the successful Gorlice–Tarnów Offensive (May 1915) his corps reached the eastern bank of the Bug River in June 1915 and the Ikva River near Dubno in August 1915.

In May 1916 his corps was transferred to the South Tyrolean front to take part as part of the 3rd Army in the subsequent South Tyrol offensive, which ended in failure.

Afterwards, Kirchbach returned with his I Corps to the Russian Front, where he took over command of the 7th Army from General of the Cavalry Karl von Pflanzer-Baltin on 8 September 1916. During the subsequent Russian Brusilov Offensive he managed to prevent the enemy troops from breaking through. On 20 October, he exchanged his command with General Hermann Kövess von Kövessháza and took over the command of the 3rd Army. He was promoted to Colonel General on 1 November 1916.

On 5 March 1917, he took command of the 4th Army, but a serious illness soon forced him to leave his post. In October 1917 he finally returned to active service but was still marked by the illness he had suffered. On 8 December 1917, Kirchbach received the title of count. At the beginning of 1918, after Operation Faustschlag, he was appointed military commander of all Austro-Hungarian troops in the Kherson Governorate with headquarters in Odessa. His task was to pacify the region and to retrieve as many resources as possible, but mainly agricultural products, from this fertile area.

In the first days of April, his poor health forced him to retire from active service. After a few months of recovery, he again applied for a front command, whereupon Emperor Karl made him inspector of the Austro-Hungarian forces on the Western Front on 24 September 1918.

After the end of the war, Colonel General von Kirchbach lived in Austria and fully recovered from his illness. He died in Scharnstein in May 1939.
