= Battle of Kraśnik =

1914 battle on the Eastern Front

Coordinates: 50°56′00″N 22°13′00″E

- Part of the Eastern Front during World War I
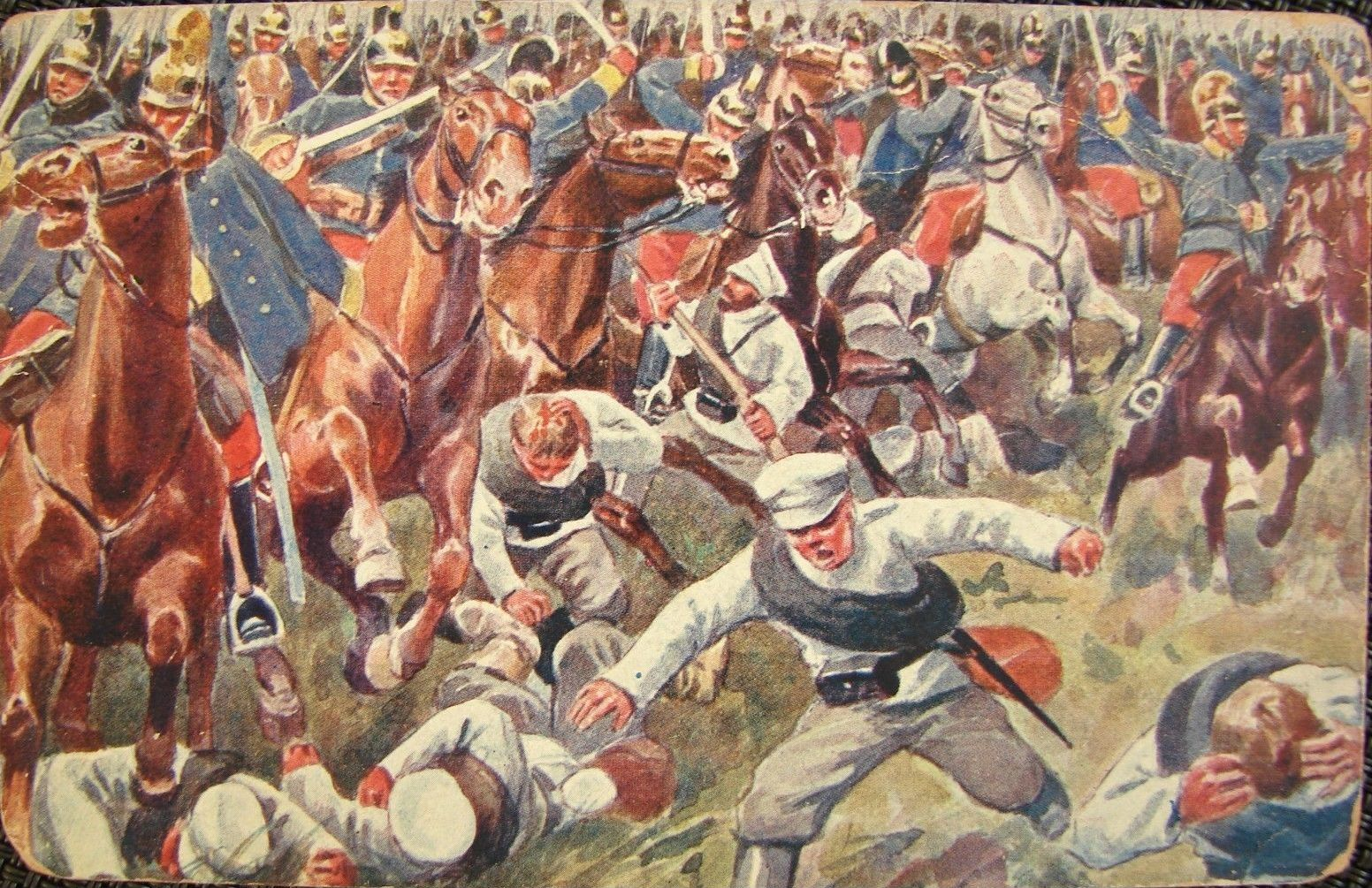
- Front side of Open Letter (Carte Postale) issued in c. 1914 with view of attack of Austro-Hungarian dragoons on Russian infantry at Krasnik (August 1914)
Date	August 23–25, 1914
Location	Kraśnik, Congress Poland, Russian Empire (present-day Poland)
Result	Austro-Hungarian victory

Belligerents
Austria-Hungary	Russian Empire

Commanders and leaders
(Austria-Hungary) Conrad von Hötzendorf (Austria-Hungary) Viktor Dankl	Nikolai Ivanov; Anton Zaltsa

Units involved
(Austria-Hungary) 1st Army	4th Army

Strength
144 infantry battalions 71 cavalry squadrons 354 guns	104 infantry battalions 100 cavalry squadrons 350 guns

Casualties and losses
15,000	25,000; Including 6,000 POW; 28 guns

The Battle of Kraśnik (German: Schlacht von Kraśnik) started on August 23, 1914, in the province of Galicia and the adjacent areas across the border in the Russian Empire, in northern Austria (in present-day Poland), and ended two days later. The Austro-Hungarian 1st Army defeated the Russian 4th Army. It was the first victory by Austria-Hungary in World War I. As a result, the 1st Army's commander, General Viktor Dankl, was (briefly) lauded as a national hero for his success. The battle was also the first of a series of engagements between Austria-Hungary and Russia all along the Galicia front.

== Initial deployment ==
According to Prit Buttar, "The Austro-Hungarian empire, whose conflict with Serbia lay at the heart of the tensions that plunged the continent into war, initially intended to strike a swift blow against Serbia before the Russians could complete mobilisation...when hostilities did begin, Conrad and his colleagues found themselves coerced by Germany to alter their plans and attack Russia. This was in order to reduce pressure on Germany, thus allowing her to complete a planned victory over France."

The Austro-Hungarian Chief of Staff, Franz Graf Conrad von Hötzendorf, established his headquarters in the Przemyśl Fortress. Armies under his command included Dankl's 1st Army, east of Sandomierz, with the I, V, and X Corps of 10 infantry divisions, 2 cavalry divisions, and an infantry brigade. North of Przemyśl was Auffenberg's 4th Army, with the II, VI, IX, and XVII Corps of 9 infantry divisions, and 2 cavalry divisions. East of Przemyśl was Brudermann's 3rd Army, with the III, XI and XIV Corps of 18 infantry divisions and 4 cavalry divisions. Heinrich Rittmeister Kummer von Falkenfeld commanded an Army Group on the western flank, with 2 infantry and 1 cavalry divisions. Kövess commanded an Army Group on the eastern flank, consisting of XII Corps. The 2nd Army, commanded by Eduard von Böhm-Ermolli, was still en route from the Serbian Front.

The Russian Southwestern Front was under the command of Nikolai Iudovich Ivanov. His forces included Saltza's 4th Army with the Grenadier Corps, 14th and 16th Army Corps of 6 infantry divisions, 3 cavalry divisions, plus an infantry and cavalry brigade. To the east was Plehve's 5th Army, with the 5th, 17th, 19th and 25th Army Corps of 10 infantry and 5 cavalry divisions. Further east was Nikolai Ruzsky's 3rd Army with the 9th, 10th, 11th, and 21st Army Corps of 12 infantry and 4 cavalry divisions. On the Russian eastern flanks was Aleksei Brusilov's 8th Army with the 7th, 8th, 12th and 24th Army Corps of 10 infantry and 5 cavalry divisions. The Russians' battle plan, based on information provided by Alfred Redl, assumed the Austro-Hungarian concentration of forces would be east of the River San.

On 19 August, Edmund Ritter von Zaremba's Austro-Hungarian 4th Cavalry Division, encountered Keller's Russian 10th Cavalry Division east of Lemberg. According to Buttar, "It would rank as the largest cavalry-versus-cavalry battle of the entire war." However, it had no impact on subsequent events, and none of the cavalry reconnaissance by either side resulted in useful information. On 22 August, Saltza's Russian 4th Army advanced into Galicia and took up positions southeast of Lublin. Simultaneously, the Austro-Hungarian armies crossed the Tanew.

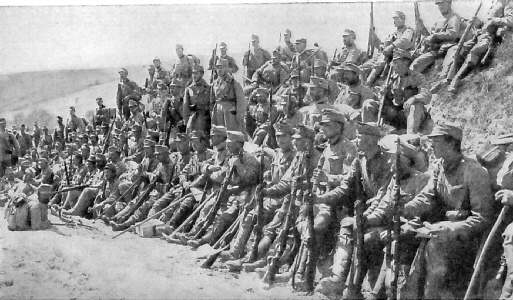
Austro-Hungarian troops rest during an advance.

== Battle ==
Going into the battle of Kraśnik, the Austro-Hungarian forces enjoyed two key advantages over their Russian opponents: superior numbers and a better strategic position. Dankl's 1st Army enjoyed a numerical advantage of ten and a half infantry and two cavalry divisions to Baron Salza's six and a half infantry and three and a half cavalry divisions. Chief of Staff Conrad's orders for the 1st Army further compounded Austro-Hungarian superiority by placing a larger than expected concentration of force further west than Ivanov and Russian Chief of Staff, General Alexeyev, had expected. On August 22, Alexeyev issued orders to his Fourth and Fifth Armies in an attempt to improve their position in the crash course they were now headed, aimed at a larger, flanking pair of armies. While these orders probably saved the Russian 4th Army from a possible much worse defeat, it failed to change the nearly pre-ordained outcome of the battle.

On 23 August, at 9 a.m., Dankl's 1st Army's I Corps encountered the Russian 4th Army's 14th Army Corps, 18th Infantry Division, near Zaklików, while the Austro-Hungarian 3rd Cavalry Division engaged the Russian 13th Cavalry Division further to the west. At mid-day, Dankl's 1st Army V Corps engaged the Russian 14th Army Corps, 45th Infantry division, and was able to secure Polichna. By the end of the day, the Russian 4th Army's 14th Army Corps was driven back in disarray, exposing the western flank of the Russian Southwestern Front.

On 24 August, the Russian 4th Army Grenadier Corps and 16th Army Corps continued their advance south, unaware that Ivanov ordered the 4th Army to hold its position, while his 5th Army turned the eastern Austro-Hungarian flank. The Russian corps encountered the Austro-Hungarian V and X Corps, fighting most of the day until afternoon, when the Russian 16th Army Corps retreated to Kraśnik. The Austro-Hungarian I Corps continued their advance to Urzędów. Saltza withdrew to Lublin during the night.

== Aftermath ==
Once routed, the Russians began a retreat towards Lublin with the also defeated 5th Russian Army which had lost at Komarów. The victorious Austro-Hungarian forces followed, inflicting further losses on the Russians. Prit Buttar estimates 15,000 Austro-Hungarian casualties and 25,000 Russian, including 6,000 taken prisoner. In 1917, Dankl was honoured with the Commanders' Cross of the Military Order of Maria Theresa, and advanced to the title of Graf Dankl von Kraśnik. Slatza was removed as the 4th Army commander and replaced by Aleksei Evert.
