= Rudi Mittig =

- Born: 25 January 1925; Liberec, Czechoslovakia
- Died: 28 August 1994 (aged 69); Berlin, Germany
- Occupation: Deputy Minister of the Stasi
- Espionage activity
- Allegiance: East Germany
- Service branch: General Intelligence Administration (Hauptverwaltung Aufklärung)
- Service years: 1952–1990
- Rank: Generaloberst

Rudi Mittig (26 January 1925 – 28 August 1994) was a senior officer of the East German Stasi.

== Birth, education ==
Mittig was born in Liberec (Reichenberg), Czechoslovakia. He attended engineering school from 1939 to 1942 before being drafted into the army in 1943. At the end of World War II, he remained in the Soviet occupied zone and completed his engineering schooling.

== Stasi career ==
In 1950, Mittig joined the Socialist Unity Party of Germany (SED) and in 1952 he was appointed by the Stasi to division III of the Bureau of Economics in Potsdam. In 1953, he was appointed head of division III, in 1954 deputy operations head, and in 1955 Bureau head. From 1956 to 1963 he served as a member of the SED district management in Potsdam. Mittig served as Deputy Minister of the Stasi from 1975 to 1989 under Erich Mielke. In 1986, he became a member of the central committee of the SED and promoted to senior general of the Stasi.

Upon dissolution of the Stasi in 1989, he served as head of the successor Office of National Security until January 1990, when he retired.

He died in Berlin, Germany in 1994.
