= Eduard von Böhm-Ermolli =

Austro-Hungarian and German Field Marshal

Freiherr Eduard von Böhm-Ermolli
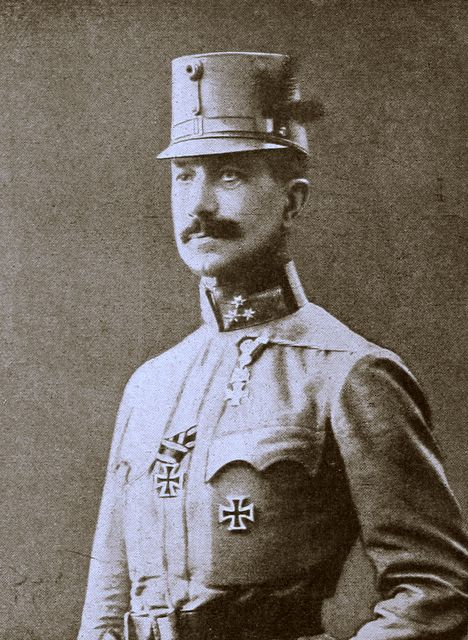
- Böhm-Ermolli as a general in the Austro-Hungarian Army
- Born: 12 February 1856; Ancona, Papal States (now Ancona, Italy)
- Died: 9 December 1941 (aged 85); Troppau, Nazi Germany (now Opava, Czech Republic)
- Burial place: Opava Municipal Cemetery
- Military career
- Allegiance: Austria-Hungary; Czechoslovakia; Nazi Germany
- Service years: 1875–1918
- Rank: Generalfeldmarschall
- Commands: 1st Army Corps; Austro-Hungarian 2nd Army; Army Group Böhm-Ermolli
- Conflicts: World War I World War II
- Awards: See Decorations and awards

Eduard Freiherr von Böhm-Ermolli (12 February 1856 – 9 December 1941) was an Austrian general during World War I who rose to the rank of field marshal in the Austro-Hungarian Army. He was the head of the Second Army and fought mainly on the front of Galicia during the entire conflict. On 30 October 1940, Böhm-Ermolli was made a German Generalfeldmarschall.

== Biography ==
=== Early life ===
Eduard Böhm was born in the Italian city of Ancona. His father, Georg Böhm (1813–1893), had as a sergeant won a battlefield commission for bravery after the battle of Novara in 1849, been promoted to the rank of major upon his retirement in 1877. In June 1885, he received permission to attach his wife's (Maria Josepha Ermolli) maiden name to his family name. He was elevated to hereditary nobility in September 1885, and hence the family was known as "von Böhm-Ermolli".

Böhm-Ermolli was trained at the cadet academy in St. Pölten and the Theresian Military Academy in Wiener Neustadt and entered the service on 1 September 1875 as a lieutenant in the dragoons. He served in a variety of line and staff positions, steadily rose through the ranks, being promoted to General of the Cavalry on 1 May 1912 and appointed commanding general of the 1st Army Corps in Kraków.

=== Service during World War One ===
At the start of World War I, Böhm-Ermolli was given command of the Austrian 2nd Army, which was intended for action on the Serbian front. After the Russian Empire mobilised, the 2nd Army was diverted to the Russian front, where it reinforced the armies of Austria's German ally. In September 1915 he also became commander of the Army Group Böhm-Ermolli which included the German South Army besides his own Second Army.

Böhm-Ermolli was promoted to Generaloberst in May 1916 and to Feldmarschall in January 1918. In March 1918, his forces occupied Ukraine. His Army Group was dissolved at Odessa at the war's end.

=== Later life ===
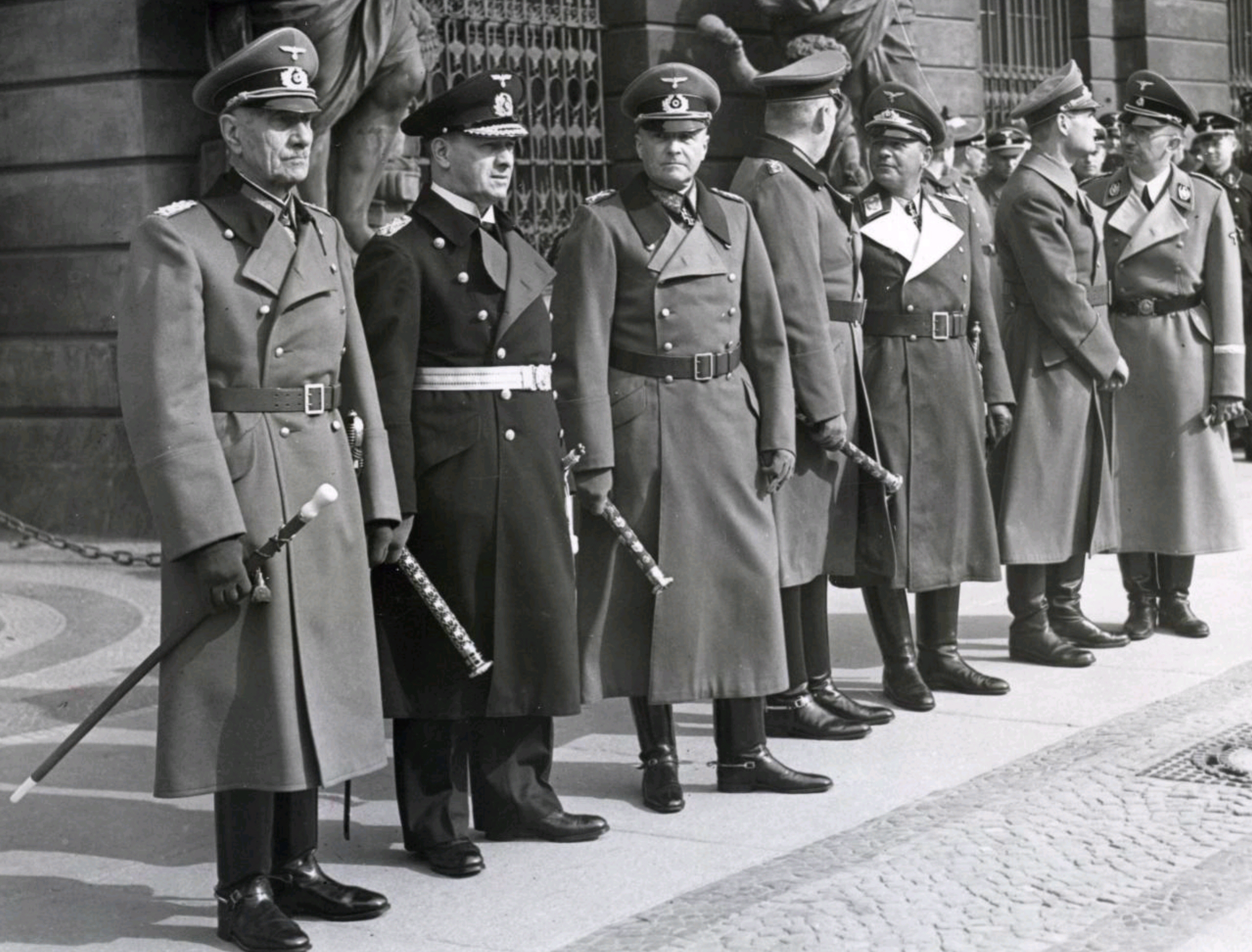
Heldengedenktag, 16 March 1941. High-ranking officers with their batons (left to right: Eduard von Böhm-Ermolli, with Austro-Hungarian Field Marshal's baton; Erich Raeder; Walther von Brauchitsch; Wilhelm Keitel; Erhard Milch; Rudolf Hess; Heinrich Himmler.)

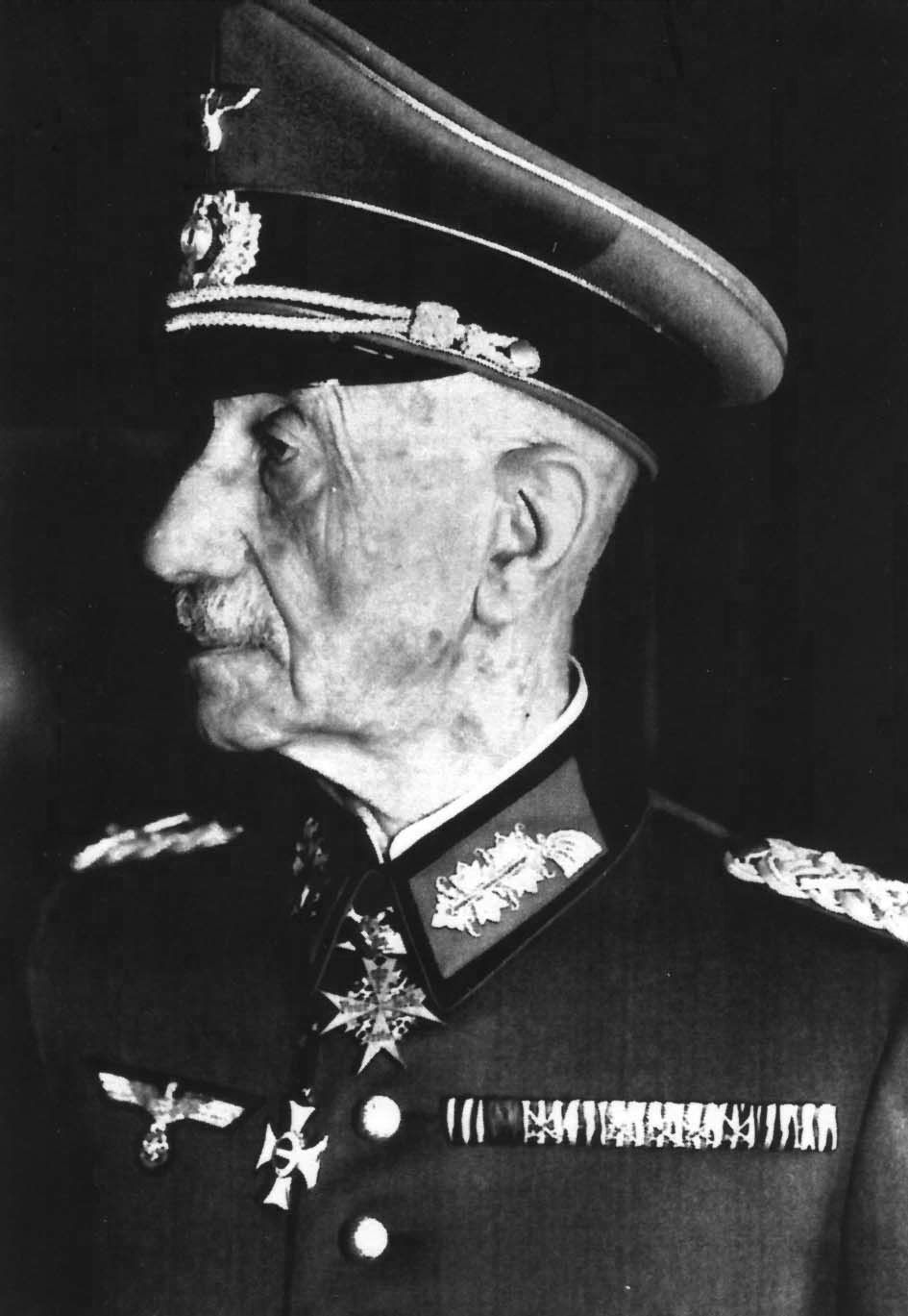
An octogenarian Böhm-Ermolli in the dress of a German Generalfeldmarschall

Böhm-Ermolli then settled in his home town of Troppau in Austrian Silesia, which became part of Czechoslovakia in 1919, and the government of Czechoslovakia paid him his pension and honored him as a General 1st Class in the reserve. In 1928 he became an "Army General" of Czechoslovakia, even though he never served in the Czechoslovak Army.

When the Sudetenland, the predominantly German settled regions along the fringes of Czechoslovakia, was annexed to Nazi Germany in 1938, he became a German subject. On 31 October 1940 Böhm-Ermolli received an honorary promotion to Generalfeldmarschall of the German Army. In addition, he was appointed honorary colonel-in-chief of Infantry Regiment Nr. 38 in his hometown of Troppau (Opava).

When he died in December 1941, he was accorded a state funeral with full military honors in Vienna.

== Military service and promotion record ==
- Cadet, Austrian Military Academy at Wiener Neustadt, Class of 1875
- Leutnant, K.u.K. Dragoon Regiment Nr 4, 1875
  - served as a general staff officer, 1870s to 1890s
- Oberst (Colonel), K.u.K., 1897
- General-Major, 1903
  - Commander, 16th Cavalry Brigade
  - Commander of a cavalry division
- Feldmarschall-Leutnant, K.u.K., 1907 (equivalent to a Major General in the U.K. and U.S.)
  - Commander in chief, K.u.K. 1st Army Corps, November 18, 1911
- General der Kavallerie, K.u.K., May 1, 1912 (equivalent in rank to Lieutenant General in the U.K. and U.S.)
  - Commander in chief, K.u.K. 2nd Army
- General-Oberst (Colonel General), K.u.K., May 1, 1916 (equivalent in rank to General in the U.K. and U.S.)
  - Commander, Army Group "Böhm-Ermolli", 1916 to 1918
- Feldmarschall, K.u.K., January 31, 1918
  - Commander of occupied Ukraine, to June 17, 1918

Retired, December 1, 1918.

- (honorary) Generalfeldmarschall, Wehrmacht, 1940

== Decorations and awards ==
Austria-Hungary:

- Royal Hungarian Order of St. Stephen – Grand Cross, 1918 (#1687)
- Military Merit Cross – I. Class Cross with War Decoration
- Order of Leopold – Grand Cross, with War Decoration & Swords
- Order of the Iron Crown – Knight, I. Class, with War Decoration
- Military Order of Maria Theresa – Commander
- Decoration for Services to the Red Cross – Star of Honor
- Order of the Iron Crown – Knight, III. Class
- Military Merit Cross – III. Class Cross
- Military Merit Medal (Signum Laudis) – in Gold
- Military Merit Medal (Signum Laudis) – in Silver
- Officer’s Long Service Cross, III. Class (25+ years of service)
- 1898 Jubilee Medal (Emperor Franz Joseph I. Golden Jubilee)

Kingdom of Bavaria:

- Military Merit Order – Knight, Grand Cross

Kingdom of Prussia:

- Iron Cross, 2nd Class
- Iron Cross, 1st Class
- Pour le Mérite
  - Oakleaves to the Pour le Mérite

Ottoman Empire:

- Ottoman War Medal (“Gallipoli Star”)
- Liyakat (Merit) Medal
- Imtiyaz (Honor) Medal
