= Brlog, Otočac =

Brlog
- Village
- Location within Croatia
- Coordinates: 44°56′30″N 15°08′00″E
- Country: Croatia
- County: Lika-Senj
- Municipality: Otočac

Area
  - Total: 29.2 km^{2} (11.3 sq mi)
- Elevation: 447 m (1,467 ft)

Population (2021)
  - Total: 256
  - Density: 8.77/km^{2} (22.7/sq mi)
- Time zone: UTC+1 (CET)
  - Summer (DST): UTC+2 (CEST)
- Postal code: 53220
- Area code: + (385)

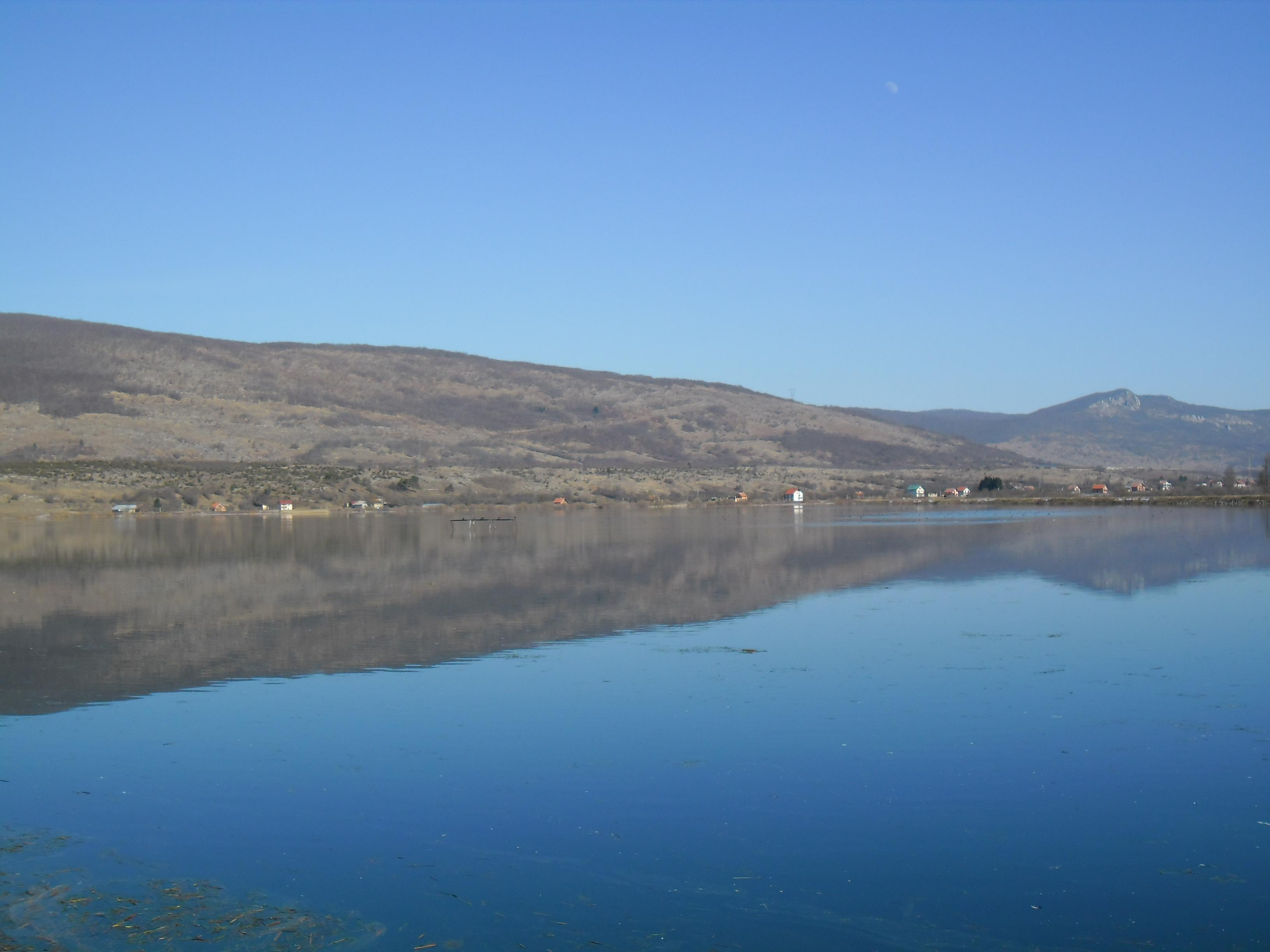
Gusić Lake near Otočac, Croatia

Brlog is a village in Otočac municipality in Lika-Senj County, Croatia.
