= 2nd Army (Austria-Hungary) =

2. Armee; 2nd Army
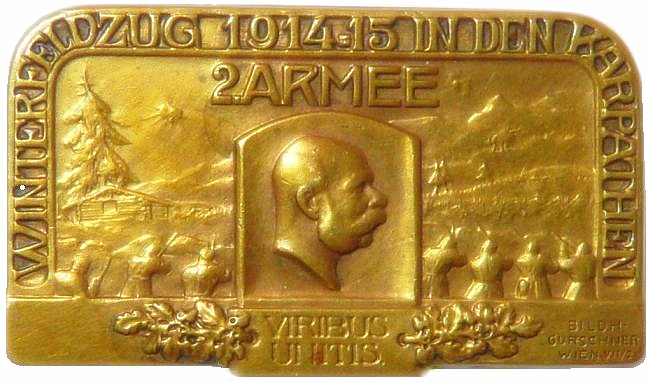
- Cap badge
- Active: August 1914 – November 1918
- Country: Austria-Hungary
- Type: Army
- Nickname: Ost-Armee (East Army)
- Engagements: World War I; Serbian campaign (1914); Battle of Cer; Battle of the Vistula River; Battle of the Carpathian Mountains; Gorlice–Tarnów Offensive; Great Retreat; Brusilov Offensive; Kerensky Offensive; Operation Faustschlag

Commanders
- Notable commanders: Eduard von Böhm-Ermolli

The 2nd Army (German: k.u.k. 2. Armee), later designated East Army (German: Ost-Armee), was a field army-level command of Austro-Hungarian Army that was active during World War I. It was initially formed to take part in the Balkans Campaign before being transferred to the Eastern Front. In the final stages of the war, the army was evacuated from Ukraine before demobilizing in November 1918.

== History ==
The 2nd Army was formed in August 1914 as part of Austria-Hungary's mobilization and the formation of Balkanstreitkräfte (Balkan Armed Forces) following its declaration of war on Serbia and Russia, carrying out the prewar plans for the formation of six field armies. Just as all Austro-Hungarian field armies, it consisted of a headquarters and several corps, along with some unattached units. It was initially composed of the XXI and III Corps, based in Hermannstadt and Graz, respectively, and was reinforced with the VII and IV Corps on 27 August and 2 September 1914. The 2nd Army was commanded by Eduard von Böhm-Ermolli. The 2nd Army was already partially committed to the campaign against the Kingdom of Serbia when it was ordered to Galicia to fight against the Russian Empire. Since it was already engaged in combat, and due to transportation difficulties, only half of its strength could be switched to the new front.

It left Potiorek before it could win him a victory; it returned to Conrad in time to participate in his defeat.

— Winston Churchill, (about the 2nd Army relocation from Serbia to Galicia),

In Galicia, the 2nd Army replaced the Austro-Hungarian 4th Army as part of Army Group Kövess due to the heavy losses it sustained in battle. In October it was transferred to Russian Poland and took part in the operations there. In February 1915, the 2nd Army was moved to the Carpathian Mountains after the 3rd Army had been badly mauled there earlier in January during its attempted offensive against Russian positions. In preparation for its attack, it was reinforced by the VII Corps.

The harsh climate and mountainous terrain of the Carpathians caused many logistical problems and caused the 2nd Army to suffer from a supply shortage. The spread of disease and the cold temperatures also took their toll on the Habsburg troops. Due to a change in weather the offensive was delayed until late February. The 2nd Army launched its assault on the same positions that the 3rd Army attacked last month, along the strategic roads leading to Przemyśl fortress, but on a narrower front. Its objective was to liberate the besieged garrison at Przemyśl, which had been stuck there since Russia occupied Galicia in 1914. Although they received additional units the battle, the 2nd Army troops were unable to break through the Russian defenses and were pushed back by counterattacks. It sustained heavy losses in the process. The VII Corps under Archduke Joseph August dwindled to just 2,000 men. The Austro-Hungarians continued to fight throughout March, and chief of general staff Franz Conrad von Hotzendorf ordered the V Corps – the unit closest to Przemyśl – to liberate the fortress. Although the fortress garrison had surrendered after a failed break-out attempt on March 19, the 2nd Army was not informed, and so the offensive was attempted. The V Corps ended up being driven back with enormous losses. By the end of the campaign, the 2nd and 3rd Armies were nearly annihilated.

During the Kerensky Offensive in 1917, the 2nd Army was driven back by the Russian 7th Army and later was defeated by the 11th Army at Zolochiv. Around that time, it was organized under Supreme Command "East", led by Prince Leopold of Bavaria. The 2nd Army occupied parts of Ukraine in the spring of 1918 and was headquartered in the port city of Odessa. It was then reorganized as an occupation army, renamed the Ost-Armee (East Army). Field Marshal Böhm-Ermolli was replaced by General of the Infantry Alfred Krauss as the army's commander in May 1918. The units of the East Army were evacuated from Ukraine in the fall of 1918, though some units mutinied and imprisoned their commanders. The army was then dissolved in November.

== Order of battle in 1914 ==
The 2nd Army order of battle in mid-1914 was as follows.

Organization of 2nd Army in 1914
Army	Corps	Division
2nd Army	XII Corps	16th Infantry Division
2nd Army	XII Corps	35th Infantry Division
2nd Army	XII Corps	38th Honvéd Infantry Division
2nd Army	III Corps	6th Infantry Division
2nd Army	III Corps	28th Infantry Division
2nd Army	III Corps	22nd Landwehr Infantry Division
2nd Army	VII Corps	17th Infantry Division
2nd Army	VII Corps	34th Infantry Division
2nd Army	IV Corps	31st Infantry Division
2nd Army	IV Corps	32nd Infantry Division
2nd Army	(Unattached)	11th Infantry Division
2nd Army	(Unattached)	43rd Landwehr Infantry Division
2nd Army	(Unattached)	20th Honvéd Infantry Division
2nd Army	(Unattached)	1st Cavalry Division
2nd Army	(Unattached)	5th Honvéd Cavalry Division
2nd Army	(Unattached)	8th Cavalry Division

== Commanders ==
The 2nd Army only had two commanders during its existence, with one of them holding the post for most of the war.

2nd Army commanders
From	Rank	Name
August 1914	Field Marshal	Eduard von Böhm-Ermolli
May 1918	General of the Infantry	Alfred Krauss

== Chiefs of staff ==
The 2nd Army had the following chiefs of staff.

2nd Army chiefs of staff
From	Rank	Name
August 1914	Major General	Artur von Mecenseffy
October 1914	Colonel	Karl von Bardolf
May 1918	Colonel	Sándor Belitska

== Books ==
- Herwig, Holger H. (2009). The First World War: Germany and Austria-Hungary 1914-1918. Bloomsbury Academic. ISBN 978-0340573488.
