= General of the cavalry =

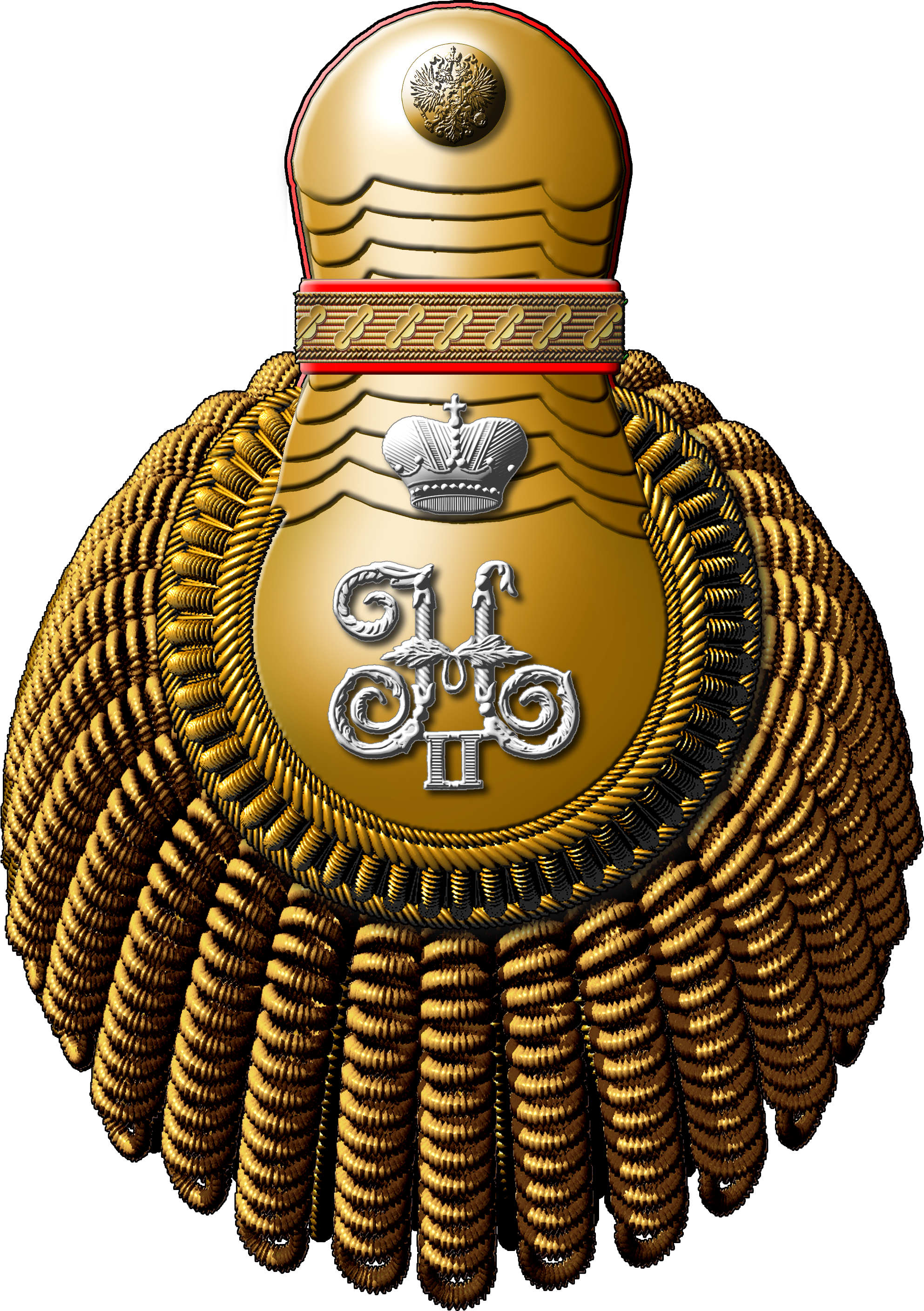
Epaulet of an Adjutant General with the rank of General of Cavalry (as of 1904), Russia

General of the Cavalry (German: General der Kavallerie) was a General officer rank in the cavalry in various states of which the modern states of German and Austria are successors or in other armies which used the German model. Artillery officers of equivalent rank were called "General of the Artillery" (General der Artillerie), and infantry officers of equivalent rank "General of the Infantry" (General der Infanterie).

For more details see:

- General of the Cavalry (Austria) for the Imperial Army of the Holy Roman Empire, Imperial Army of the Austrian Empire, and Imperial Army of the Austro-Hungarian Empire
- General of the Cavalry (Finland) for the Finnish Defence Forces of the Republic of Finland.
- General of the Cavalry (Germany) for the German Imperial Army, the interwar Reichswehr, and the Wehrmacht
- General of the Cavalry (Imperial Russia) for the Russian Imperial Army of the Russian Empire until 1917–18.
