= Viktor Dankl von Krasnik =

Austro-Hungarian military officer

Graf Viktor Dankl von Kraśnik
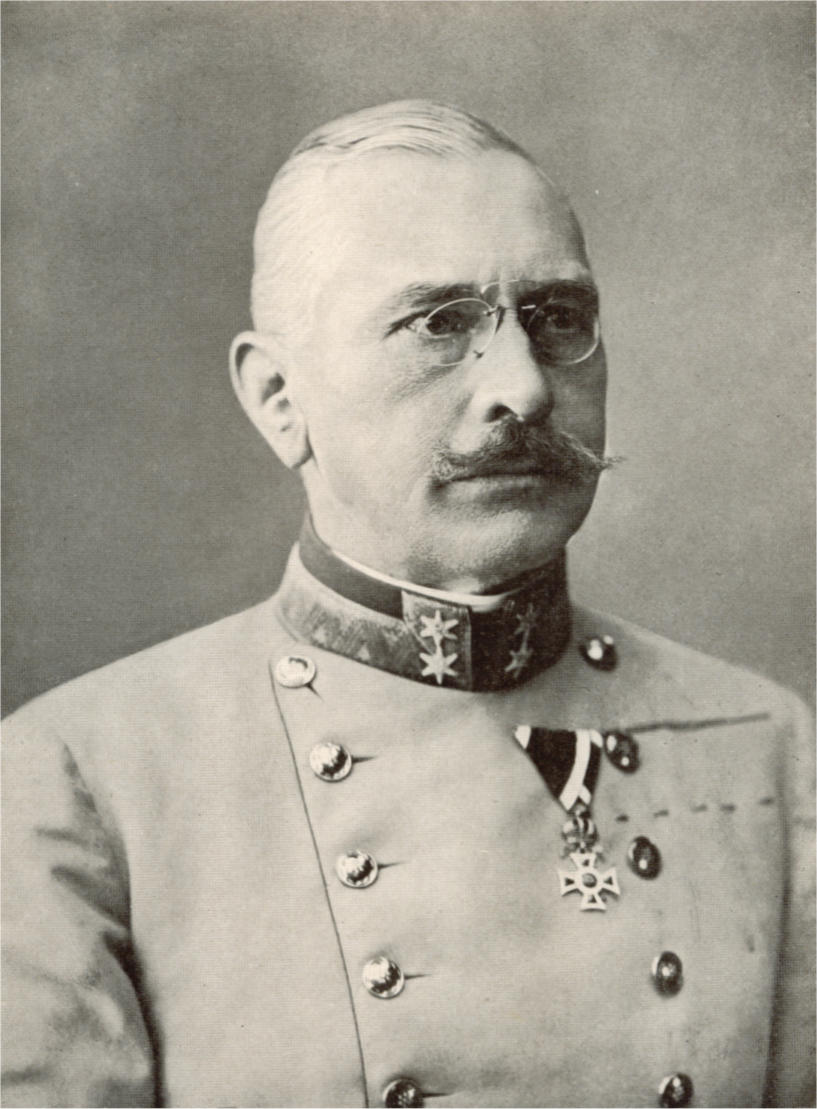
- Count Viktor Dankl von Kraśnik
- Born: 18 September 1854; Weiden in Friaul, Kingdom of Lombardy–Venetia, Austrian Empire (present-day Udine, Friuli-Venezia Giulia, Italy)
- Died: 8 January 1941 (aged 86); Innsbruck, Reichsgau Tirol-Vorarlberg, Nazi Germany
- Military career
- Allegiance: Austria-Hungary
- Branch: Austro-Hungarian Army
- Service years: 1874–1918
- Rank: Colonel general
- Conflicts: First World War
- Awards: Military Order of Maria Theresa

Viktor Julius Ignaz Ferdinand Graf Dankl von Kraśnik (Born as Viktor Dankl; 18 September 1854 – 8 January 1941) was a highly decorated Austro-Hungarian officer who reached the pinnacle of his service during World War I with promotion to the rare rank of Colonel General (Generaloberst). His successful career met an abrupt end in 1916 due to both his performance on the Italian front and health issues. After the war, he would be a vocal apologist for both his country's war record and the dethroned Habsburg monarchy.

== Early life and career ==
Viktor Dankl was born in the then Imperial Austrian Kingdom of Lombardy–Venetia (dissolved in 1866 and since 1919 in Italy). His father was a Captain in the army from nearby Venice. His secondary education would first take place in Görz (now Gorizia), where his family relocated after his father's retirement, and then in Triest (now Trieste). Both schools were German language Gymnasiums. In 1869, at the age of fourteen, he moved on to the Cadet Institute at St. Pölten, Lower Austria. From 1870 until 1874 he attended the Theresian Military Academy at Wiener-Neustadt, also in Lower Austria.

Upon completion of the academy, Krasnik was assigned to the 3rd Dragoon Regiment as a Second Lieutenant. After completion of the War School in Vienna, he became a general staff officer in 1880. For the next two decades, he rose through the officer ranks, becoming the head of the central office of the Austro-Hungarian general staff in 1899. In 1903 he was promoted to the rank of major general and given command of the 66th Infantry Brigade in Trieste. From 1905 until 1907 he would head up the 16th Infantry Brigade, also in Trieste. After being promoted to a lieutenant field marshal (Feldmarschalleutnant), Krasnik would receive command of the 36th Division in Zagreb until 1912, at which point he was moved to Innsbruck to command the 14th Corps. Later that year, on 29 October, Krasnik was elevated to the rank of General of Cavalry.

== World War I ==
=== 1914 ===
At the beginning of war in summer 1914, Krasnik was put in command of the Austro-Hungarian 1st Army. That August the 1st Army, along with the 4th Army, would compose the northwestern flank of Austro-Hungarian Chief of Staff, Franz Conrad von Hötzendorf’s, push towards Russian forces in Russian Poland and the Galicia region. On 22 August, after crossing the San River, Krasnik's army would engage the Russian 4th Army at the Austro-Hungarian town of Kraśnik. The ensuing battle of Kraśnik ended three days later with Dankl victorious and the Russian 4th Army retreating back towards the city of Lublin in Russian territory. Krasnik pursued his opponents after the battle but was ultimately forced to withdraw after a series of defeats further southeast along the Austro-Hungarian lines in the largescale battle of Galicia. For his victory at Kraśnik, the first for Austria-Hungary in the war, Krasnik would later be decorated with the Commander's Cross of the Military Order of Maria Theresa on 17 August 1917 (see below). Krasnik experienced a good deal of fame and popularity after the battle, becoming something of a national hero until his once rising star would be tarnished by setbacks later on in the war.

After being driven back by Russian forces Krasnik and his 1st Army were part of a renewed offensive in October 1914 that was undertaken with the German forces to the north and west. Gains made during this drive proved to be only temporary as more or less of a stalemate developed in Dankl's area.

=== 1915 ===
The 1st Army did not see much action during the winter of 1914-15 and were held as reserves for more active Carpathian part of the front further east. During the following spring Krasnik would lead his third and final offensive with the 1st Army. The Gorlice–Tarnów Offensive in May 1915 enjoyed early success and Dankl's 1st Army had once again achieved an advance. However, his renewed success would be cut short by a loss at the battle of Opatów which stalled any further push.

On 23 May 1915 Italy declared war on Austria-Hungary and Dankl was soon reassigned to the resulting new front in Austria-Hungary's southwest. He would be made commander-in-chief of the defense of Tyrol, his headquarters in Bolzano. Like much of the Austro-Hungarian Army during the war, the forces under his command were poorly supplied and had inferior equipment. Furthermore, they were outnumbered.

=== 1916 ===
Throughout the remainder of 1915 and into early 1916, Dankl was able to hold the line, halting numerous Italian attempts to break through into Austria-Hungary. This bought important time for the front to be reinforced. His forces were able to overcome their disadvantages due to their often superior leadership and experience.

In March 1916 Krasnik was given command of the 11th Army and on 1 May he was promoted to colonel general. Later that month he would be part of the Asiago offensive, a plan masterminded by Franz Conrad von Hötzendorf, the architect of the 1914 Austro-Hungarian advance in Galicia. Krasnik and the 11th Army were assigned the critical task of making an initial breakthrough that could be exploited by additional reinforcements (the 3rd Army). The attack commenced on 15 May and initially, Krasnik was quite successful. He managed to cut through the first and second Italian lines and move south of Rovereto to the Posino Valley. On 20 May this surge stalled due to the artillery's inability to negotiate the treacherous snowy mountain roads. It was not until June that the Austro-Hungarians were able to try a largescale advance. By this time the Italians had regrouped and some Austro-Hungarian forces were siphoned off to the Eastern Front. As a result, a stalemate set in. Once again Krasnik had produced an impressive advance that would prove to be short-lived. His role in the offensive would prove to be his undoing as a combat commander and he would be sidelined for the remainder of the war.

== Resignation, later career, and retirement ==
Dankl was criticized both by Army Group Command (Archduke Eugen) and by the Austro-Hungarian Supreme Command (Conrad). He had ignored an order given by Archduke Eugen to advance at a faster pace, disregarding the lack of artillery. How much Dankl's slow and steady style contributed to the stalling of the Asiago offensive is debatable. These charges and complaints, coupled with his very real health problems, caused the general to send a letter of resignation. On 17 June 1916 he was dismissed from command. His 11th Army chief of staff, Major General Pichler, was also relieved of his position.

After undergoing an operation on his throat, specifically a goitre, he was assigned command of the First Arcièren-Leibgarde, part of the Imperial Guards, on 21 January 1917. Dankl rose to commander-in-chief of the Imperial Guards in February 1918 until he was replaced at that post by Conrad, his former superior officer during his time at the front, the following summer. He returned to the First Arcieren-Leibgarde, where he remained until the end of the Habsburg rule over Austria-Hungary. He was retired from the army on 1 December 1918 and moved to Innsbruck.

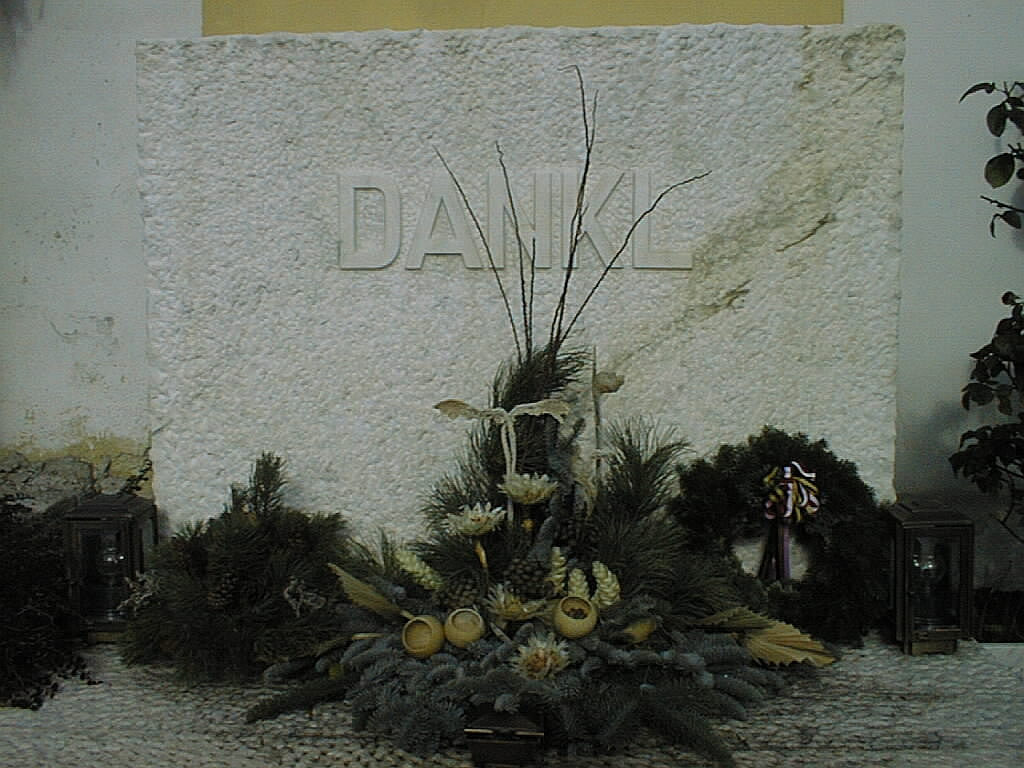
Dankl's grave in the churchyard of Wilten Basilica, Innsbruck.

=== Interwar ===
In 1925 Dankl would assume the chancellorship of the Maria Theresa Order. This time he would be replacing a position held by Conrad, who left the vacancy upon his death that year. For the next six years he would be in charge of decorating Austro-Hungarian soldiers from World War I. He undertook this task with much enthusiasm, becoming an outspoken apologist of not only his fellow veterans but of Austria-Hungary in general. He even went so far as to advocate the return of the monarchy, putting himself at odds with the growing support of Austrian Nazi groups for Hitler and Germany. He was a firm opponent of the Anschluß, favoring an Imperial Austria under Habsburg to a Nazi German Reich under Hitler until the end. He refused totalitarianism, fascism, antisemitism and World War II. By the time of his death he was seen as a stark anachronism, out of step with the new era of the Greater Germanic Reich.

=== Death and burial ===
On 8 January 1941 Viktor Dankl died at the age of eighty-six. His wife had died a mere three days earlier. He was buried in the churchyard of Wilten Basilica in Innsbruck and his grave can still be visited. Due to his well-known anti-Nazi stance, the Wehrmacht was ordered not to honor Dankl with any sort of military ceremony.

== Honors and decorations ==
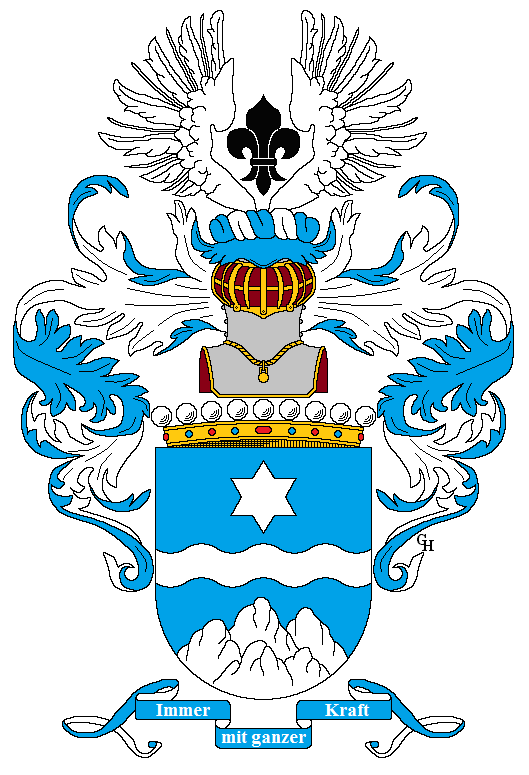
Arms of Graf Dankl von Kraśnik, 1918

Throughout his mostly distinguished career, Dankl was the recipient of a large amount of military and non-military awards. Despite his reputation as being somewhat short tempered, he was noted as one of Austria-Hungary's finer generals of World War I by Conrad.

On 17 August 1917 Dankl was decorated with the Commander's Cross of the Military Maria Theresa Order in recognition of his services during the battle of Kraśnik. In accordance with the statutes of this order, Dankl became a baron in his country's nobility and was since styled "Freiherr von Dankl". In 1918, Emperor Charles I further advanced him to the degree of count and granted him the territorial title of "Kraśnik", after which he was styled "Graf Dankl von Krasnik". This makes Dankl a rare example of a person in Austria who was born a commoner but rose to the title of count. In 1925, he was appointed as Chancellor of the Military Order of Maria Theresa as a successor to Conrad.

His military awards include: the Commander's Cross of the Military Maria Theresa Order, the Grand Cross of the Order of Leopold with War Decoration, the Military Merit Cross First Class with War Decoration, the German Iron Cross of 1914, First and Second Class, the Marian Cross of the Teutonic Order, and the Star of the Decoration for Services to the Red Cross with war decoration.

Civilian honors include an honorary PhD from an Innsbruck University in philosophy, the naming of a "Dankl" street in Innsbruck and honorary membership in the German Student Corps Danubia Graz.
