= General of the artillery =

General of the Artillery is/was a general officer of artillery, and may be:

- General of the Artillery (Germany) and Austria-Hungary
- General of the Artillery (Imperial Russia)
- General of the Artillery (Poland)
- Feldzeugmeister (OF-8) of the Austria-Hungarian armed forces 1868-1918

== See also ==
- Master-General of the Ordnance
- General of the Infantry
- General of the Cavalry
