= General of the infantry =

General of the infantry is a military rank of a General officer in the infantry and refers to:

- General of the Infantry (Austria)
- General of the Infantry (Bulgaria)
- General of the Infantry (Germany) (General der Infanterie), a rank of a general in the German Imperial Army, Reichswehr or Wehrmacht, as well as an official position of the Bundeswehr, held by an officer in the rank of Generalleutnant now and previously of General of the branch, who is responsible for the training and equipment of the infantry.
- General of the Infantry (Russian Empire) (генерал от инфантерии), rank of general in the Russian Imperial Army

== See also ==
- General of the Cavalry
- General of the Artillery (disambiguation)
- G.I. (military), a U.S. rank thought to mean "general infantry" but comes from "galvanized iron"
