= Brudermann =

Brudermann is a surname. Notable people with the surname include:

- Adolf von Brudermann (1854–1945), Austro-Hungarian general, brother of Rudolf
- Nin Brudermann (born 1970), Austrian artist
- Rudolf von Brudermann (1851–1941), Austro-Hungarian general
