= Order of the Iron Crown (Austria) =

Imperial order of merit (1815–1918)

Imperial Order of the Iron Crown
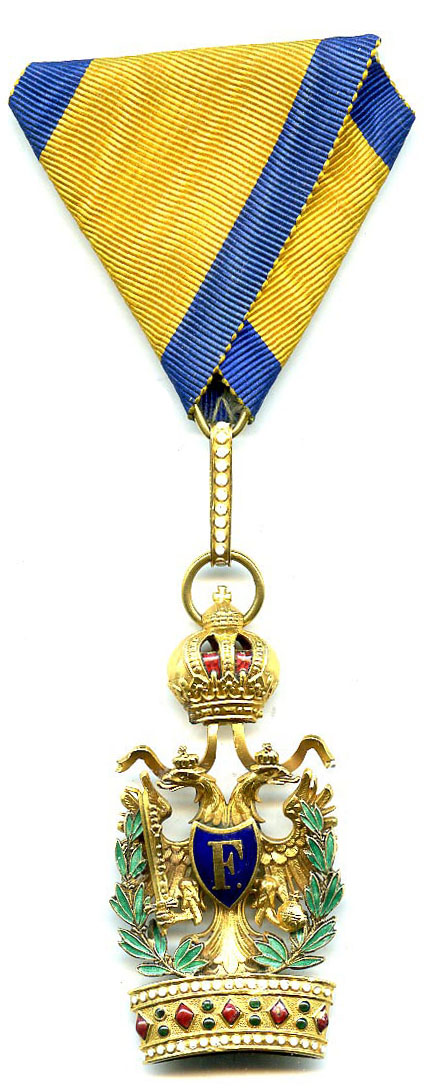
- Insignia of the Order (third class)

Awarded by the Emperor of Austria
- Type: Dynastic order
- Royal house: House of Habsburg-Lorraine
- Awarded for: Civil Merit
- Status: Dormant since 1918
- Grades: 1st Class; 2nd Class; 3rd Class

Precedence
- Next (higher): Order of Leopold
- Next (lower): Order of Franz Joseph
- Equivalent: Order of Elizabeth
- Related: Order of the Iron Crown (Italy)
- Ribbon of the Order

The Imperial Order of the Iron Crown (German: Kaiserlicher Orden der Eisernen Krone; Italian: Ordine imperiale della Corona ferrea) was one of the highest orders of civil merit in the Austrian Empire and Austria-Hungary until 1918. It was founded in 1815 by Emperor Franz I of Austria as a re-establishment of the original Order of the Iron Crown, which previously had been an order of the Napoleonic Kingdom of Italy.

The order had three classes and, until 1884, all classes conferred automatic hereditary ennoblement. The third class conferred the rank of Ritter, the second class conferred the rank of Baron, and the first class conferred the title of Privy Councillor, the style of Excellency and the right to attend court. According to the order's statutes, only a limited number of members throughout the empire were allowed at any given time. The maximum number of 1st class knights was 20, for the 2nd class it was 30 and for the 3rd class 50, limiting the total number of members to 100 at any given time.

== History ==
The Holy Roman Empire, ruled by the Habsburg dynasty, gave way to the Empire of Austria between 1804 and 1806. The last Holy Roman Emperor, Franz II, was proclaimed Emperor Franz I of Austria. His daughter, the Archduchess Maria Louise, was Napoleon’s second wife and Empress Consort, and the mother of Napoleon’s only legitimate son and heir, Napoleon, Duke of Reichstadt. With the collapse of Napoleon’s empire, Imperial Austria regained its traditional control of Lombardy as the Kingdom of Lombardy–Venetia.

The Austrian order was also divided into three distinct classes of knighthood, recognized as the First, Second, and Third Classes. Investment of this order carried an Imperial patent of nobility. With the collapse of the Austro-Hungarian Empire, in 1918, all but one (the Order of the Golden Fleece) of the chivalric orders of its monarchy were formally abolished.

== Insignia ==
While the ribbon colors changed from the Imperial French gold and green to the Imperial Austrian gold and royal blue, the general look of the medal remained largely the same – an imperial eagle set within a representation of the Iron Crown of Lombardy. Grand Cross (French) and First Class (Austrian) knights wore a sash and badge over the right shoulder, with an eight-pointed star (that featured the Iron Crown at its center) on the left breast. Imperial French knight commanders wore a traditional military style medal on the left chest, with the addition of a bow in the center of the ribbon to delineate them from ordinary knights. Imperial Austrian Second Class knights wore the medal suspended from a ribbon about the neck. French ordinary knights and Austrian Third Class knights wore a traditional military medal on the left chest.

From 1908 for First Class knights, and from 1917 for Second Class knights, the Imperial Austrian order allowed for an undress version to be worn with service dress. First Class knights were authorized to wear a Third Class military medal on the left breast, with an addition of a device known as a "Kleine Dekoration". The pin device was a miniature version of the First Class breast star, and was worn on the center of the ribbon to delineate the wearer as a knight of the First Class. Variations in the star matched the details of the knight's specific award: including the war decoration wreath and the crossed swords. The Second Class Kleine Dekoration was a miniature depiction of the Iron Crown of Lombardy (copied from the lower part of the actual medal). As with the First Class knights, the Kleine Dekoration for the Second Class knights matched the award to the knights: crown only for peacetime award, crown encircled by a wreath for the war decoration, and topped with swords for those awards "with swords", and was worn in the same fashion as that of the First Class knights.

During World War I, awards "with swords" were given to symbolize personal valour of the knight that led to his award. Hence, ordinary knights medals were also frequently adorned with crossed swords, pinned to the tri-fold ribbon.

Ribbon bars
Third Class	Second Class	First Class

== Notable recipients ==
=== Masters of the Order ===
- Franz I, Emperor of Austria, 1816–1835
- Ferdinand I, Emperor of Austria, 1835-1848
- Franz Joseph I, Emperor of Austria-Hungary, 1848–1916
- Karl I, Emperor of Austria-Hungary, 1916–1918

=== Knights ===
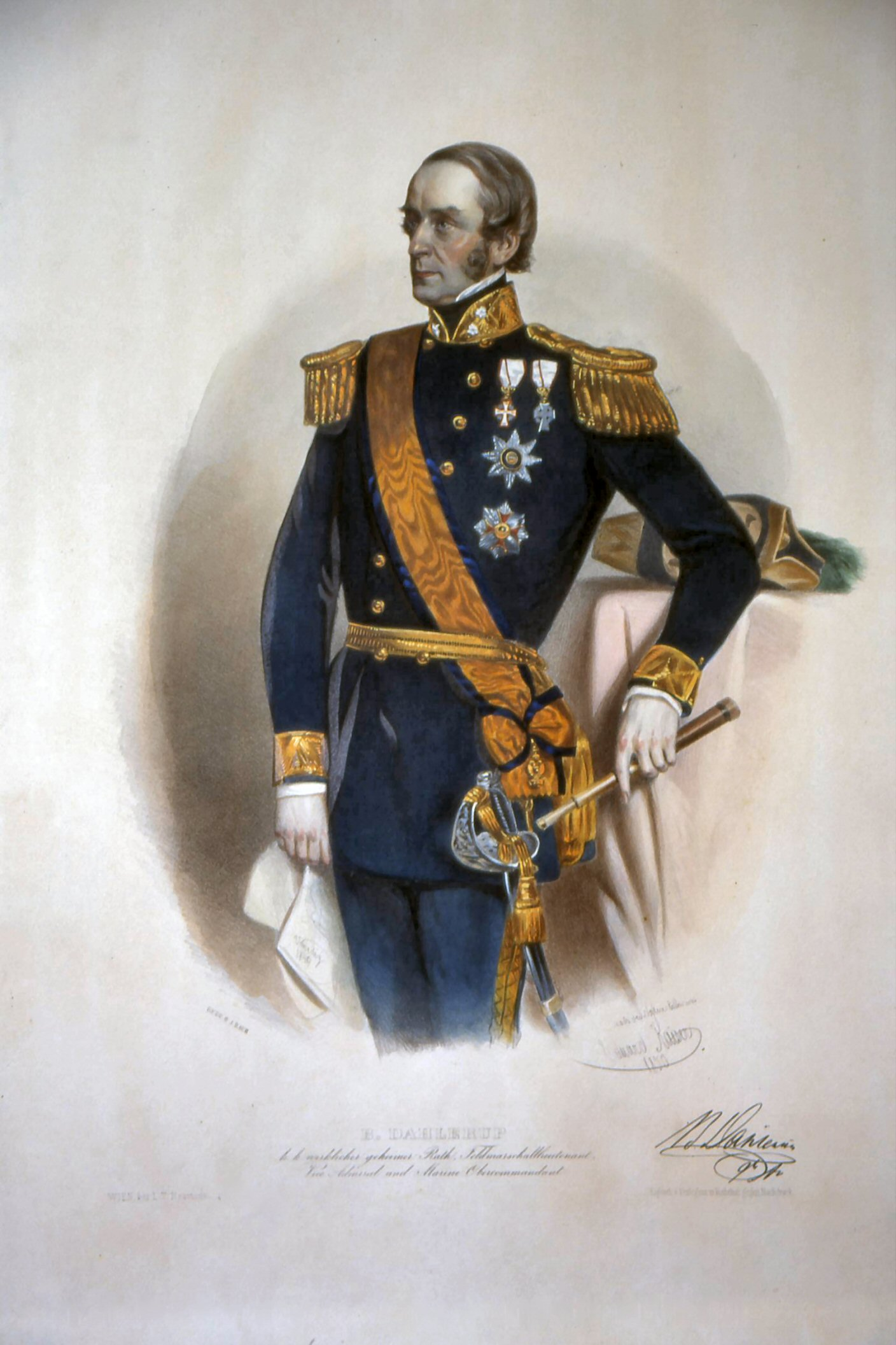
Vice Admiral Hans Birch Dahlerup 1850 wearing star and ribbon of a knight I. Class

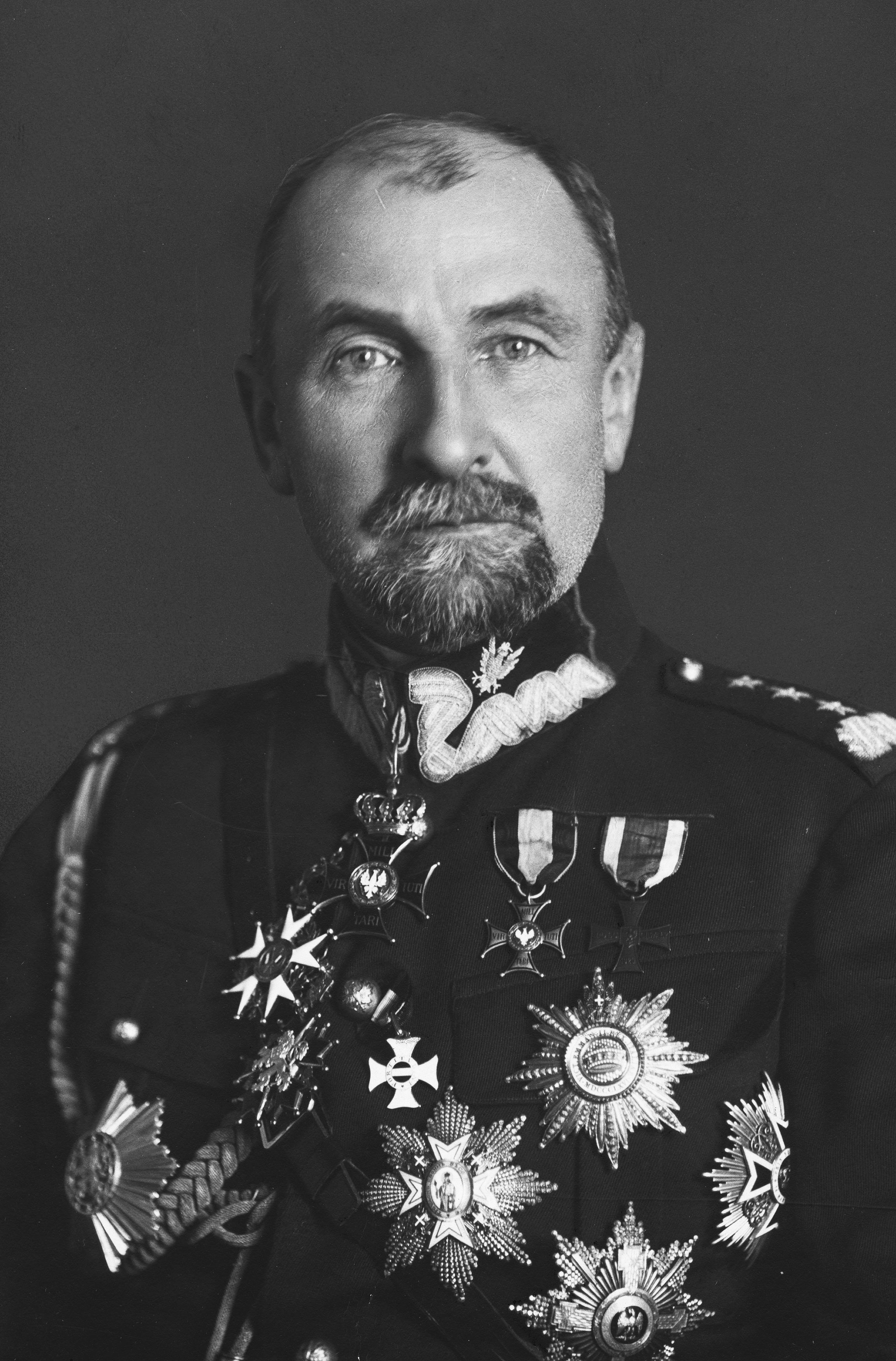
Lieutenant field marshal Tadeusz Rozwadowski wearing star of a knight I. Class (top right)

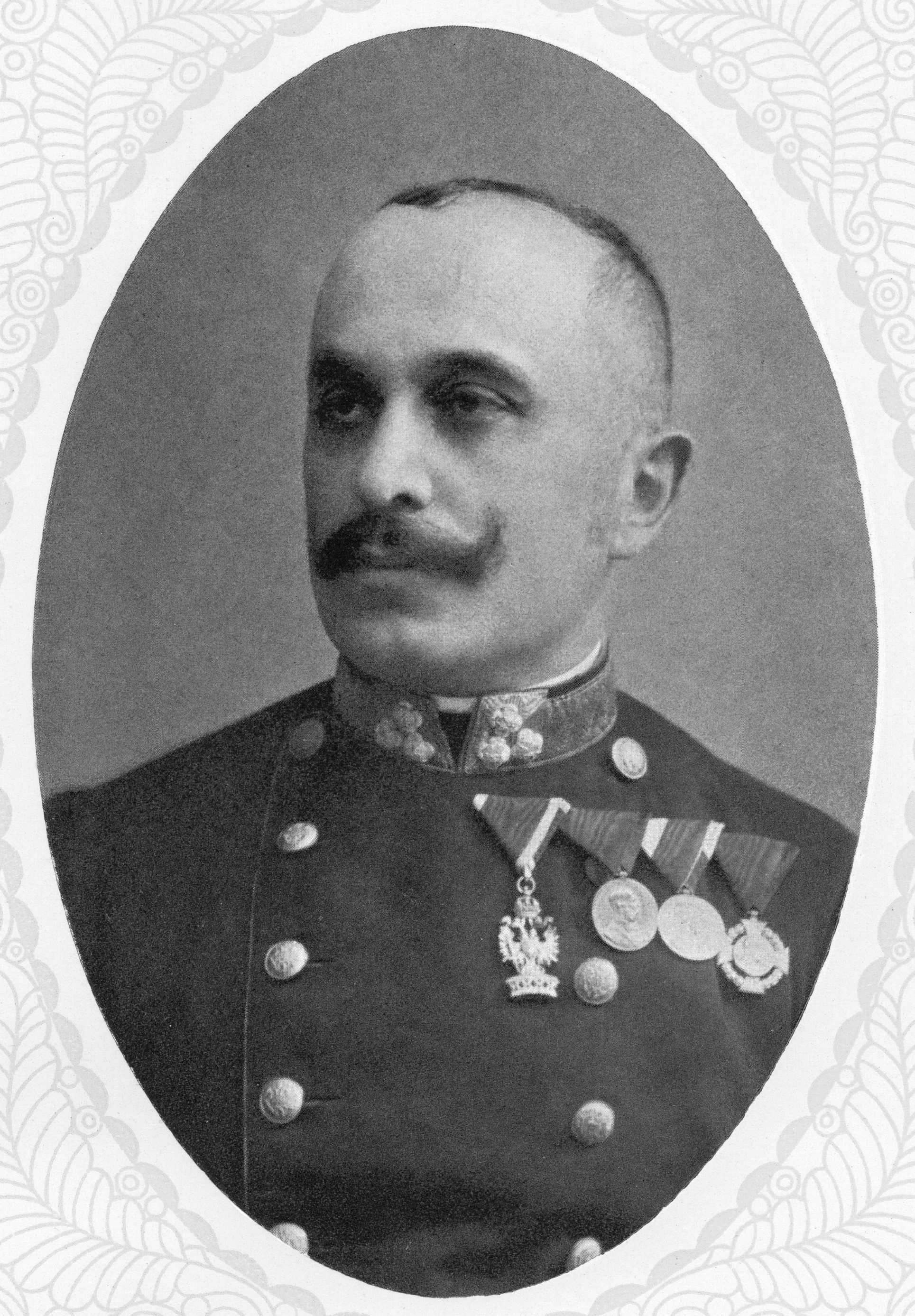
First Attorney of State Dr. Demeter von Tuschinski in 1912 wearing insignia of a knight III. Class
- James Hamilton, 2nd Duke of Abercorn
- Giuseppe Acerbi
- Alois Lexa von Aehrenthal
- Hasan bey Agalarov
- Archduke Albrecht Franz, Duke of Teschen
- Alfred, 2nd Prince of Montenuovo
- Augusto Carlos Teixeira de Aragão
- Count Kasimir Felix Badeni
- Ferdinand von Bauer
- Friedrich von Beck-Rzikowsky
- Heinrich von Bellegarde
- Johannes Benk
- Leon Biliński
- Josef Bílý
- Friedrich Wilhelm von Bismarck
- Herbert von Bismarck
- Otto von Bismarck
- Wilhelm von Bismarck
- Fedor von Bock
- Eduard von Böhm-Ermolli
- Walther Bronsart von Schellendorff
- Bruno, Prince of Ysenburg and Büdingen
- Adolf von Brudermann
- Rudolf von Brudermann
- Bernhard von Bülow
- Karl von Bülow
- Artur Maximilian von Bylandt-Rheidt
- Leo von Caprivi
- Eduard Clam-Gallas
- Count Manfred von Clary-Aldringen
- Prince Siegfried von Clary-Aldringen
- Cevat Çobanlı
- Franz Conrad von Hötzendorf
- Anton Csorich
- Karl von Czyhlarz
- Hans Birch Dahlerup
- Maximilian Daublebsky von Sterneck
- Adolf von Deines
- Rudolf von Delbrück
- Georg Dragičević
- Ludwig Draxler
- Carl August Ehrensvärd (1858–1944)
- Josef Fanderlik
- Géza Fejérváry
- Ferdinand III, Grand Duke of Tuscany
- Emanuel Salomon Friedberg-Mírohorský
- Ventura García-Sancho, Marquess of Aguilar de Campoo
- Agenor Maria Gołuchowski
- Heinrich von Gossler
- Karl von Habsburg
- Otto von Habsburg
- Wilhelm von Hahnke
- Hans Heinrich XV, Prince of Pless
- Anton Haus
- Alajos Hauszmann
- Karl Eberhard Herwarth von Bittenfeld
- Miklós Horthy
- Archduke Hubert Salvator of Austria
- Dietrich von Hülsen-Haeseler
- Karl Georg Huyn
- Itō Hirobumi
- Ányos Jedlik
- Archduke Joseph August of Austria
- Archduke Joseph Ferdinand of Austria
- Georg von Kameke
- Gustav von Kessel
- Karl Graf von Kirchbach auf Lauterbach
- Anton Klodič von Sabladoski
- Eduard von Knorr
- Hans von Koester
- Alexander von Koller
- Prince Konrad of Bavaria
- Hermann Kövess von Kövessháza
- Franz Kuhn von Kuhnenfeld
- Joseph Edler von Küchler
- Auguste, Baron Lambermont
- Franciszek Latinik
- Ernst Lauda
- Archduke Leopold Salvator of Austria
- Joseph Maximilian von Maillinger
- Ferdinand von Malaisé
- Edwin Freiherr von Manteuffel
- Jan Matejko
- Gabriel Jean Joseph Molitor
- Helmuth von Moltke the Younger
- Rudolf Montecuccoli
- Georg Alexander von Müller
- Miroslav Navratil
- Nicholas I of Montenegro
- Maximilian Njegovan
- Laval Nugent von Westmeath
- Alexander August Wilhelm von Pape
- Thorleif Paus
- Archduke Peter Ferdinand of Austria
- Karl von Pflanzer-Baltin
- Hans von Plessen
- Ferdinand von Quast
- Joseph Radetzky von Radetz
- Antoni Wilhelm Radziwiłł
- Wilhelm von Ramming
- Manfred von Richthofen
- Sándor Farkas de Boldogfa
- Prince William of Schaumburg-Lippe
- Alfred von Schlieffen
- Emil von Schlitz
- Eberhard Graf von Schmettow
- Friedrich von Scholl
- August Schwendenwein von Lanauberg
- Hans von Seeckt
- Gustav von Senden-Bibran
- Stanisław Smolka
- Hermann von Spaun
- Philipp von Stadion und Thannhausen
- Rudolf Stöger-Steiner von Steinstätten
- Emanuel von Stross
- Stanisław Szeptycki
- Sándor Szurmay
- Ludwig Freiherr von und zu der Tann-Rathsamhausen
- Myron Tarnavsky
- Karl Tersztyánszky von Nádas
- Tewfik Pasha
- August Johan Ritter von Trapp
- Georg von Trapp
- Fyodor Trepov (senior)
- Aymard d'Ursel
- Illarion Vorontsov-Dashkov
- Karl von Wedel
- Ludwig von Welden
- Karl Weyprecht
- Duke William of Württemberg
- Constantin von Wurzbach
- Yamagata Aritomo
- Arthur Zimmermann
- August zu Eulenburg
- Gustav von Epstein

== See also ==
- Order of chivalry
- Order of St. George (Habsburg-Lorraine)
- Orders, decorations, and medals of Austria-Hungary

== Sources ==
- Blom, Philipp. To Have and to Hold: An Intimate History of Collectors and Collecting. Overlook, 2003. pp. 146–147.
- Gottschalck, Friedrich. Almanach der Ritter-Orden. Leipzig, Kingdom of Saxony: Georg Joachim Goeschen, 1819.
