= Battle of Komarów (1914) =

August 1914 battle of WW1's Eastern Front

Battle of Komarow
- Part of the Eastern Front during World War I
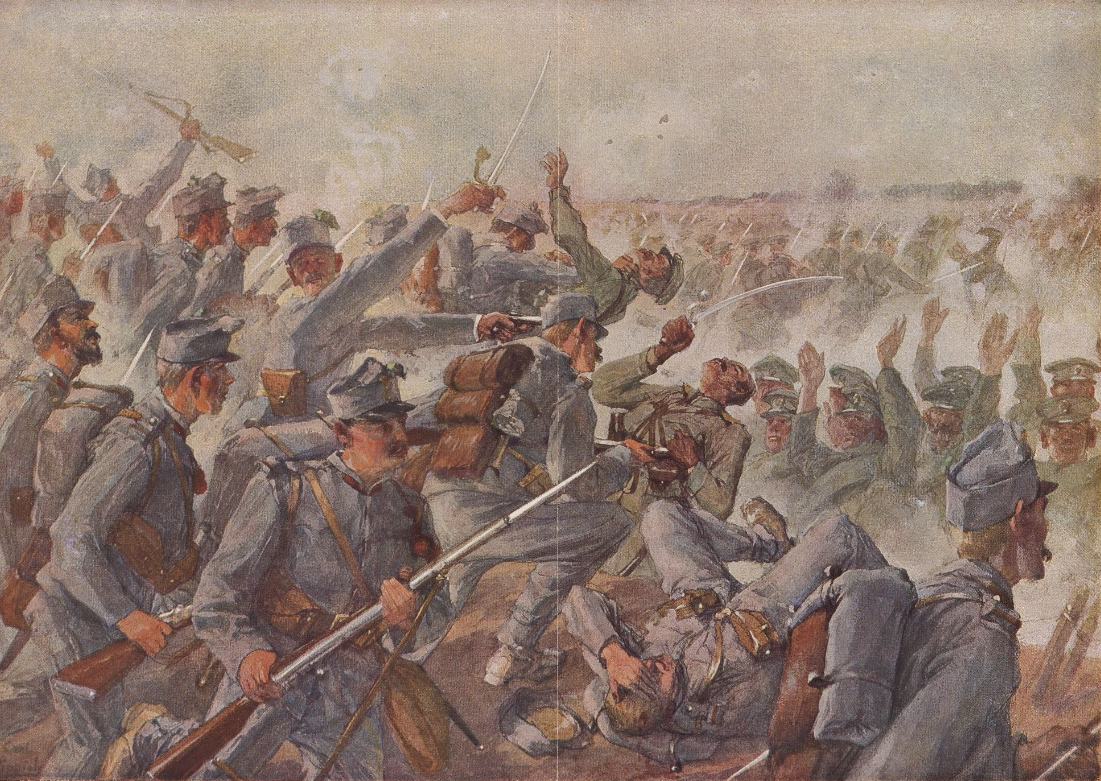
- Austrian infantry storm Russian trenches in the battle of Komarów (C. Pippich)
Date	26 August – 2 September 1914
Location	Komarów and Zamość, Russian Poland
Result	Austro-Hungarian victory

Belligerents
Austria-Hungary	Russian Empire

Commanders and leaders
(Austria-Hungary) Moritz von Auffenberg (Austria-Hungary) Franz Graf Conrad von Hötzendorf (Austria-Hungary) Blasius von Schemua	Pavel Plehve; Aleksei Evert

Units involved
(Austria-Hungary) 4th Army	5th Army

Strength
250,000 men, 474 or 456 guns	147,000 men, 304 machine gun, and 516 or 456 guns

Casualties and losses
40,000 casualties: 20,000 killed and wounded; 20,000 captured	30,000–40,000 casualties: 20,000–26 000 killed and wounded; 10,000 prisoners and 150 guns captured

The Battle of Komarow (known in Russia as the Battle of Tomaszów) was a battle on the Eastern Front during World War I. It would prove a victory for the Austro-Hungarian forces, but one they would not be able to reproduce in the coming months of the war.

== Background ==
In pre-war planning, on 2 August, Helmuth von Moltke the Younger wrote Franz Graf Conrad von Hötzendorf, "The German army corps marching on Kalisz-Czenstochau will in any case begin an advance on Radom-Nowo-Alexandriya via Kalisz-Czenstochau on the 12th day of mobilisation. The commander of the corps is ordered to advance relentlessly into Russia and to join up with the left flank of the leftmost Austrian army." According to Prit Buttar, "...Conrad was keen to take the offensive and needed little urging. He had repeatedly shared with his German counterpart the concept of a huge pincer operation to isolate the Russian salient west of Warsaw."

The Austro-Hungarian armies under Conrad's command included Dankl's 1st Army, east of Sandomierz, with the I, V, and X Corps of 10 infantry divisions, 2 cavalry divisions, and an infantry brigade. North of Przemyśl was Auffenberg's 4th Army, with the II, VI, IX, and XVII Corps of 9 infantry divisions, and 2 cavalry divisions. East of Przemyśl was Brudermann's 3rd Army, with the III, XI and XIV Corps of 18 infantry divisions and 4 cavalry divisions. Heinrich Rittmeister Kummer von Falkenfeld commanded an Army Group on the western flank, with 2 infantry and 1 cavalry divisions. Kövess commanded an Army Group on the eastern flank, consisting of XII Corps, with the 2nd Army, commanded by Eduard von Böhm-Ermolli.

The Russian Southwestern Front was under the command of Nikolai Iudovich Ivanov. His forces included Saltza's 4th Army with the Grenadier Corps, 14th and 16th Army Corps of 6 infantry divisions, 3 cavalry divisions, plus an infantry and cavalry brigade. To the east was Plehve's 5th Army, with the 5th, 17th, 19th and 25th Army Corps of 10 infantry and 5 cavalry divisions. Further east was Nikolai Ruzsky's 3rd Army with the 9th, 10th, 11th, and 21st Army Corps of 12 infantry and 4 cavalry divisions. On the Russian eastern flanks was Aleksei Brusilov's 8th Army with the 7th, 8th, 12th and 24th Army Corps of 10 infantry and 5 cavalry divisions.

Following the Battle of Kraśnik, Dankl's 1st Army had forced the Russian 4th Army to retreat towards Lublin. As a counterattack, Plehve's Russian 5th Army attempted to turn the Austro-Hungarian eastern flank. Plehve's 19th, 5th, and 27th Army Corps advanced along the River Bug, while his 25th Army Corps was to the west.

== Battle ==
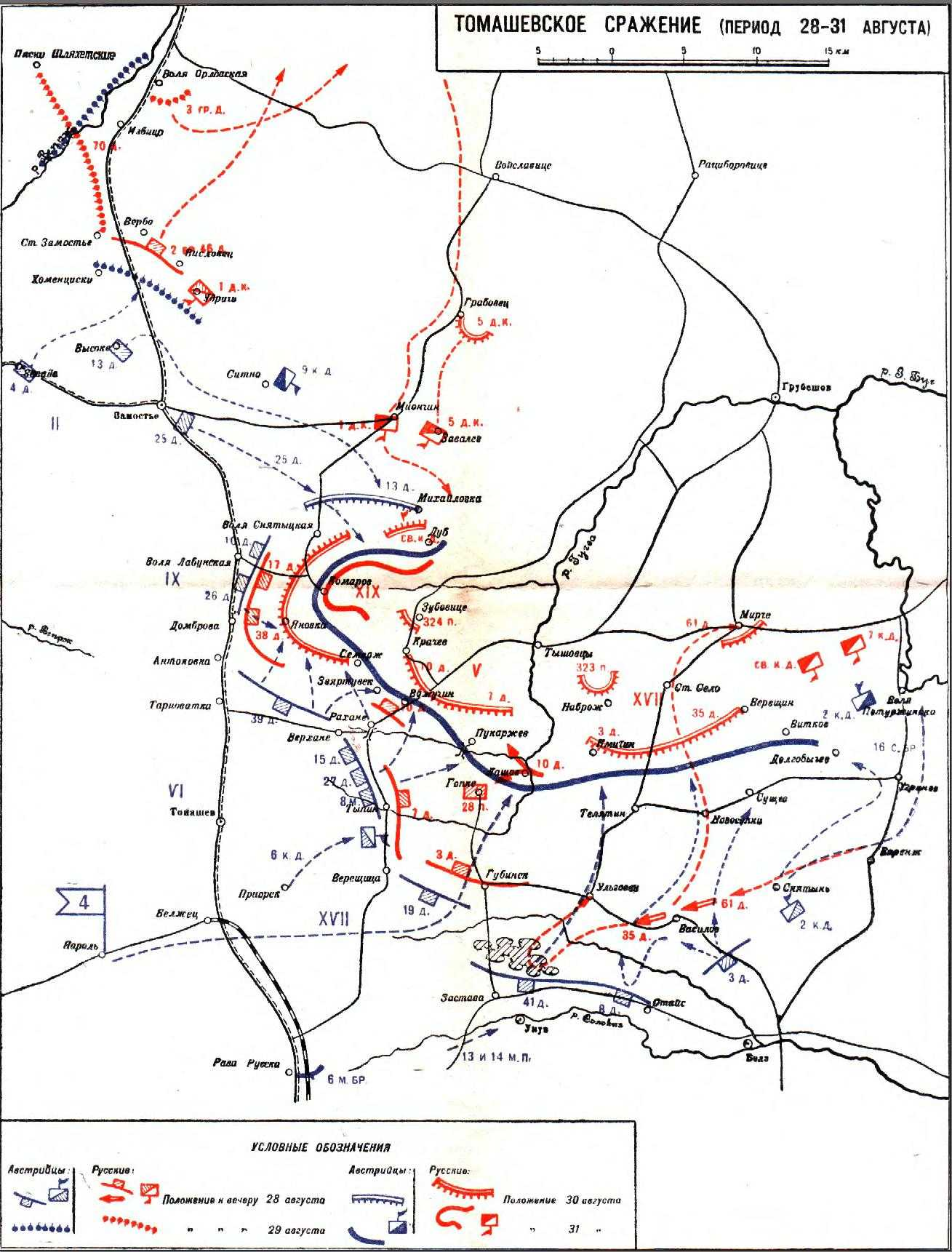
Russian map of the battle

On 26 August, the Russian 25th Army Corps came under attack by the Dankl's 1st Army's X Corps, and Auffenberg's 4th Army's II Corps. After reaching Zamość, the Russians corps had to retreat to Krasnystaw. In the meantime, Plehve's 17th Army Corps reached Sokol, while his 19th and 5th Army Corps advanced southwest. On 27 August, Archduke Joseph Ferdinand of Austria's XIV Corps, with 4 infantry divisions, guarded the Austrian-Hungarian eastern flank, right of the XVII Corps, while the VI Corps faced the Russian 17th and 5th Army Corps. Little was achieved on either side after two days of fighting, other than a reduction in fighting strength of the Russian 25th Army Corps. On 28 August, the Austro-Hungarian XVII Corps attacked the eastern flank of the Russian 5th Army Corps, disrupting its attack. Similarly, the archduke's corps attacked the rear of the Russian 17th Army Corps, who retreated in disarray by the end of the day. On 29 August, the Austro-Hungarian II Corps advanced eastwards from Zamość, while the archduke's corps advanced to Hulkze. On 30 August, Dankl's 1st Army's X Corps occupied Krasnostaw.

== Aftermath ==
Short of supplies, and exhausted after days of fighting, Auffenberg was unable to pursue the retreating Russians. According to Brit Puttar, "The victory at Komarów was incomplete, inasmuch as Plehve escaped being encircled and thus saved much of his army, but his losses were considerable. The Austro-Hungarians took over 20,000 prisoners, and captured 150 guns. But the battlefield losses of both sides were heavy."

== Additional Reading ==
- Nikolai Golovin. Great battle for Galicia
