= Karl Georg Huyn =

Colonel General of Austria Hungary

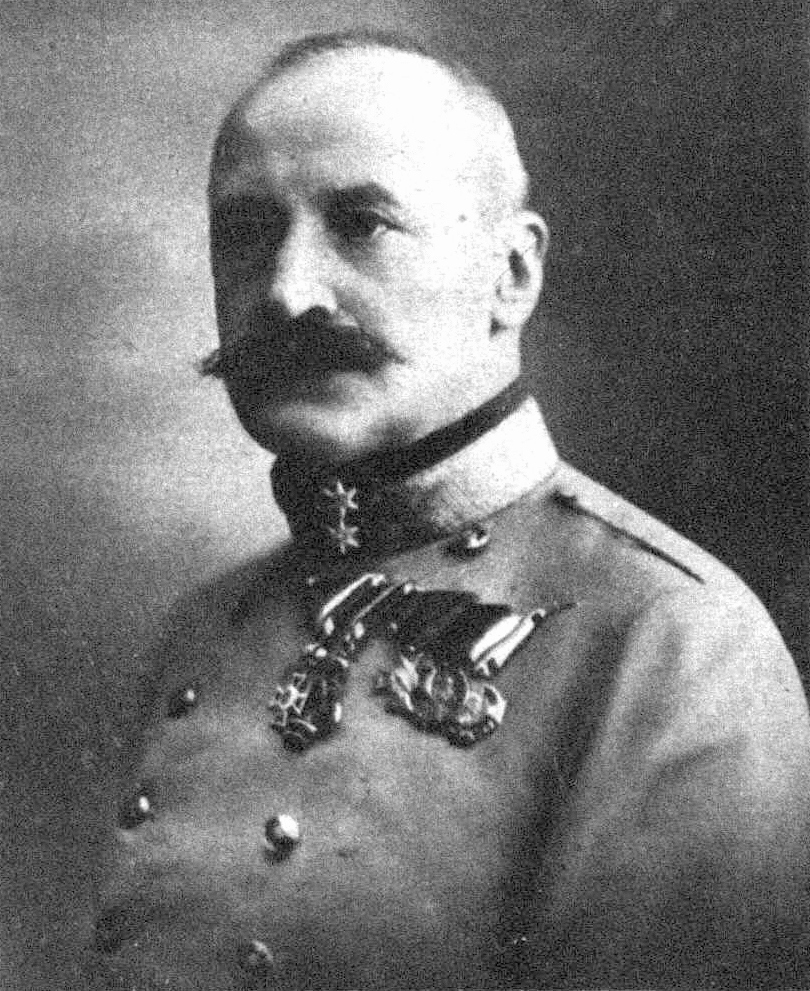
- General Karl Georg Graf Huyn
- Born: Karl Georg Graf Huyn; 18 November 1857; Vienna, Austrian Empire
- Died: 21 February 1938 (aged 80) Bolzano, Kingdom of Italy
- Allegiance: Austria-Hungary
- Branch: Austro-Hungarian Army
- Service years: 1879–1919
- Rank: Colonel General
- Commands: XVII Corps; Military Governor of Galicia
- Conflicts: World War I

Karl Georg Otto Maria Graf von Huyn (18 November 1857 – 21 February 1938) was an Austro-Hungarian colonel general and the last military governor of Galicia during World War I.

== Biography ==
Karl Georgy Huyn was the son to Johann Carl Huyn and Natalie Born. His brother, Pavel Huyn, became Archbishop of Prague and Latin Patriarch of Alexandria. Following his father, Karl Georg Huyn attended the Theresian Military Academy, located in Wiener Neustadt, after attending a military school in Sankt Pölten. He excelled in the school, later to become a lieutenant in the Dragoon Regiment No.2 on 24 April 1879. The following year he was transferred to the Uhlan Regiment No. 11.

From 1881 to 1883 he attended a war school in Vienna and completed it with great success. Afterwards he was appointed to the general staff in Maribor and later to Lviv as a first lieutenant in 1884.

Huyn was promoted to captain in 1887, serving briefly in Przemyśl as part of the Second Army Corps from Vienna. In April 1891 he was awarded the Knight's Cross and the Order of the Golden Lion in the Netherlands. After his marriage to Maria Ignatia Countess Lutzow on 16 March 1892, Huyn was a Major for a military attaché appointed in Bucharest. In the same year he was appointed the chief of staff of the cavalry in Kraków.

He was promoted to general of the cavalry shortly before the outbreak of World War I and Huyn was given command of the newly formed XVII Corps that formed part of the 4th Army under General Moritz von Auffenberg. After several unsuccessful operations in the Komarów area, Karl Georg Huyn was relieved of his command at the instigation of Auffenberg and was ordered off to Vienna.

In 1917 he was given the post of military governor of Galicia in Lviv, so on 1 March 1917, he was appointed governor in the Kingdom of Galicia and Lodomeria with the Grand Duchy of Kraków. In 1918 he resisted liquidation, thinking it was impossible for Poland to be restored. Galicia was lost in 1919 due to the collapse of Austria-Hungary after its defeat in October 1918. He died on 21 February 1938, at the age of 80.
