= Emanuel Salomon Friedberg-Mírohorský =

Czech illustrator, painter, writer and nobleman (1829–1908)

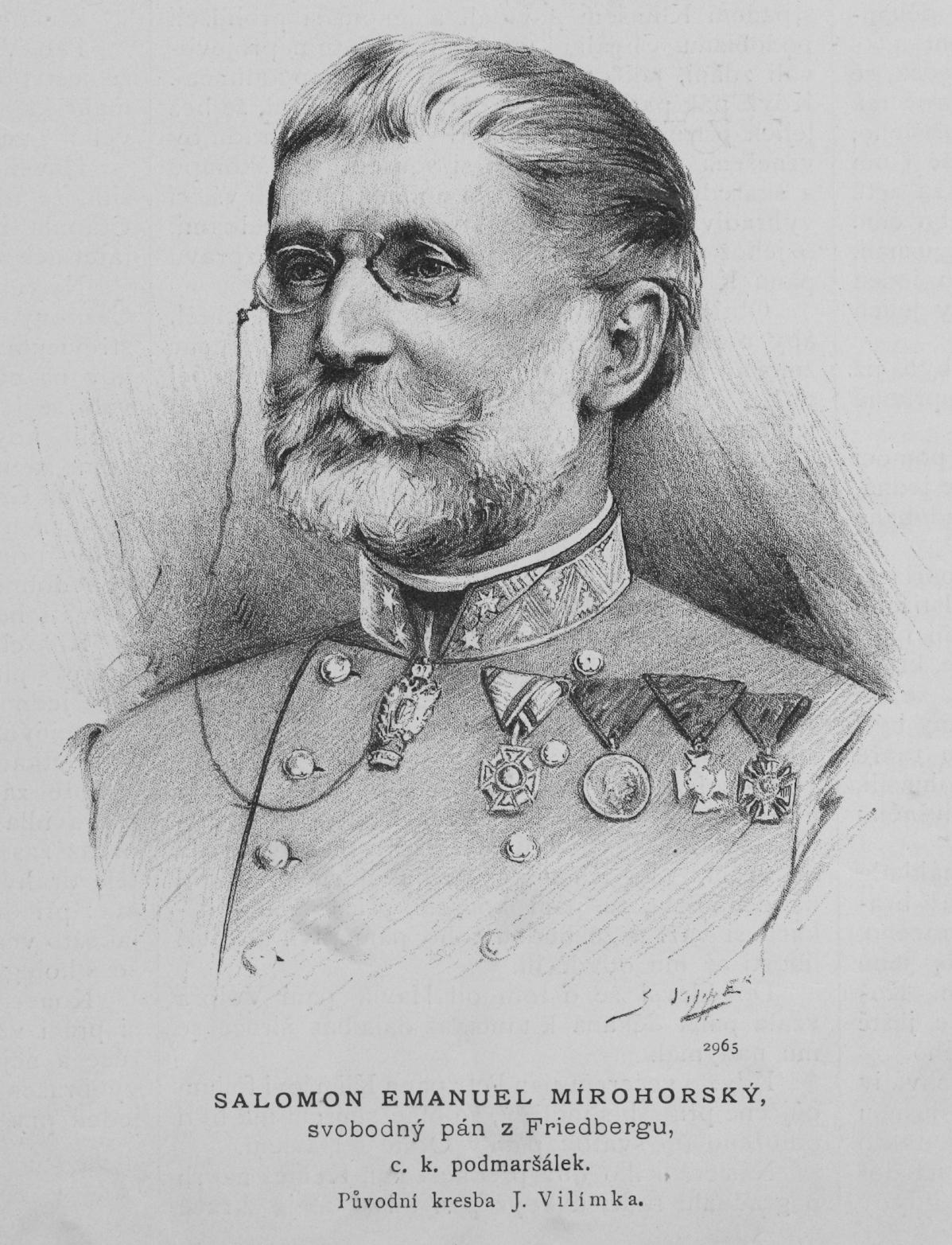
- Portrait of Friedberg-Mírohorský by Jan Vilímek (1889)
- Born: 18 January 1829; Prague, Bohemia, Austrian Empire
- Died: 10 December 1908 (aged 79); Prague, Bohemia, Austria-Hungary
- Burial place: Olšany Cemetery
- Education: Theresian Military Academy
- Occupations: Painter, illustrator, translator, writer, military officer
- Known for: Advocating for vegetarianism and abstinence

Emanuel Salomon Friedberg-Mírohorský (18 January 1829 – 10 December 1908) was a Czech painter, illustrator, translator, writer and officer in the Austrian Army. He was also an advocate of vegetarianism and abstinence. "Mírohorský" was an artistic pseudonym that means the same thing as "Friedberg" ('peaceful mountain') in Czech.

== Biography ==
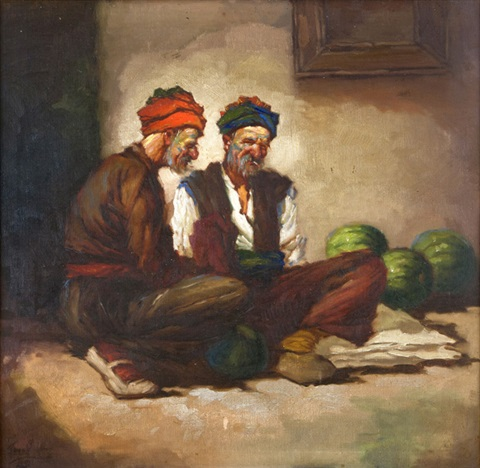
Melon Vendors

He was born on 18 January 1829 in Prague. He was born to a well-known family Salomons of Friedberg. In 1837, he began taking drawing lessons at the local grammar school that were organized by František Tkadlík and Antonín Mánes from the Academy of Fine Arts. In 1840 he became a student of the Theresian Military Academy, where was one of the teachers was his uncle Moric Fialka, an army officer and journalist, who had a great influence on Emanuel.

He completed his studies in 1847 and returned to Prague, where he joined the 28th Infantry Regiment. In 1848, when the Revolutions began, his regiment fought under the command of Field Marshal Radetzky at the Battle of Custova. Furthermore, he participated in the suppression of the revolution in Vienna and then in Hungary. For the bravery in the Battle of Kápolna received, 27 February 1849, Military Merit Cross.

In the following years he worked on the military mapping of Vojvodina, Wallachia and Hungary. He progressed quickly in his career.

In the Austro-Prussian War, he served as chief of general staff in Verona and headed the negotiations with the Italian General, Enrico Cialdini, whose troops had illegally crossed the border, in 1866. After that, he was transferred to General Headquarters in Zadar.

In 1873, he was promoted to major-general and, in 1878, to Lieutenant field marshal.

During his military career, he painted whenever possible. He also wrote articles for Czech newspapers.

== Retirement ==
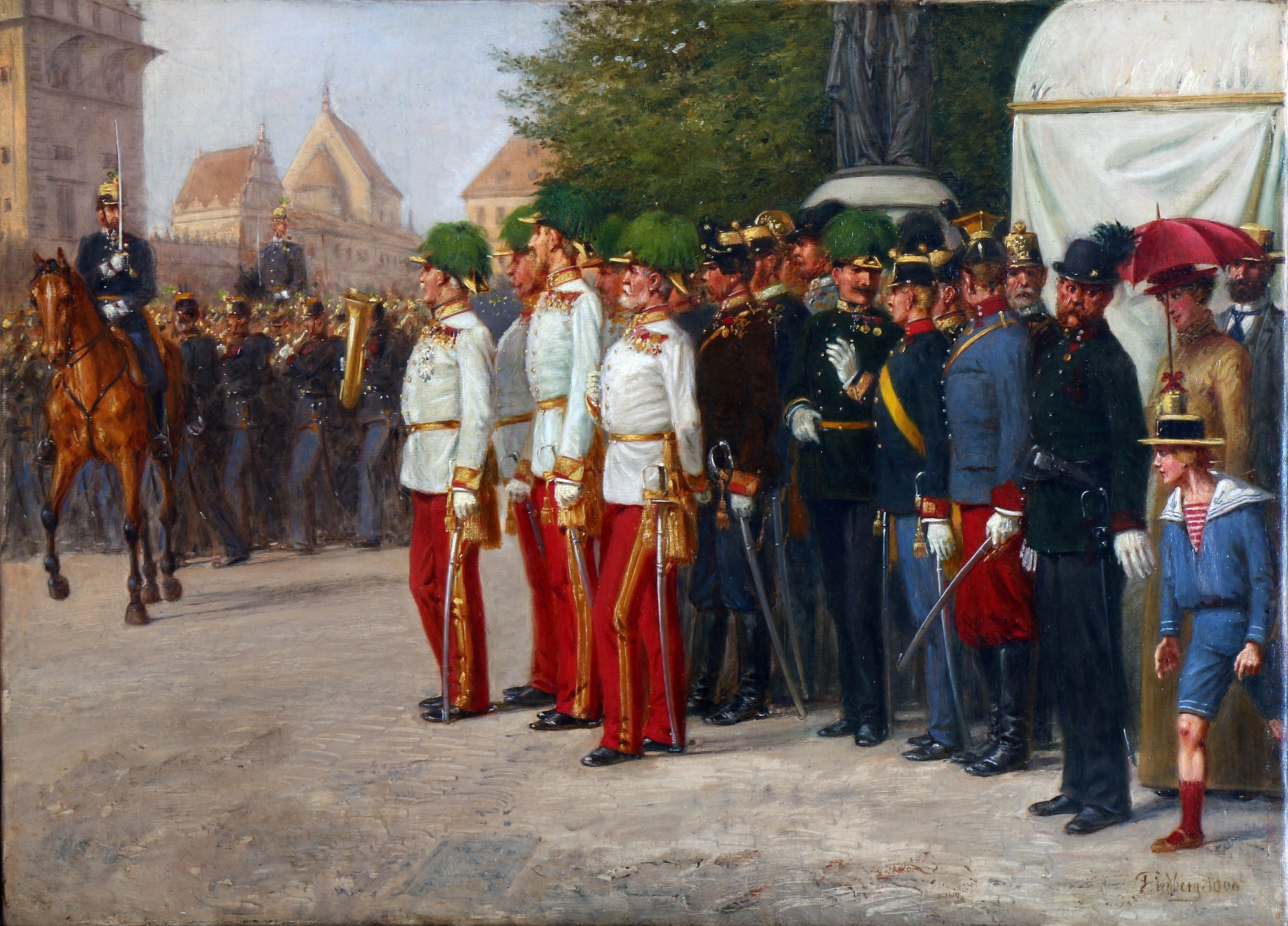
Parade in Prague

He retired in 1883, immediately following a gala dinner with Emperor Franz Joseph, where there was some sort of disagreement over the issue of Czech nationalism, but it is not known for certain if that was the cause. After retiring, he was awarded the Order of the Iron Crown and, the following year, was created a Freiherr.

He settled in Prague where he devoted himself to many interests. He was still painting and writing.

He painted in a wide variety of genres, including battle scenes that were commissioned by the Emperor. His early works are mostly watercolors, due to the difficulty of painting in oils while out in the fields or on the move. In addition, he also illustrated books and, it is believed, provided perhaps thousand of drawings to magazines, which were published anonymously because of their anti-government content. He also had a major showing at the General Land Centennial Exhibition (1891). Most of his paintings were given away to museums, churches, friends and former associates.

His original writings are related to his military service; notably Válečnictví polní a vojenství (a history of warfare, with a few sections written by Miroslav Tyrš). He also contributed articles to Otto's encyclopedia and wrote some theatrical plays, His greatest literary but unpublished work is autobiography "Paměti z mého žití".

Emanuel was very linguistically gifted. He spoke fluent Czech, German, French, Italian and English and partly other Slavic languages. He translated several books into Czech.

Besides painting and writing, his greatest hobby was a healthy lifestyle. From childhood he was non-alcoholic and non-smoker. He didn't drink coffee either. From 1851 he became interested in hydrotherapy and later became a vegetarian. As a pensioner he lectured on this subject and in 1893 founded "Český Kneipp", a society for a healthy lifestyle.

== Personal life ==
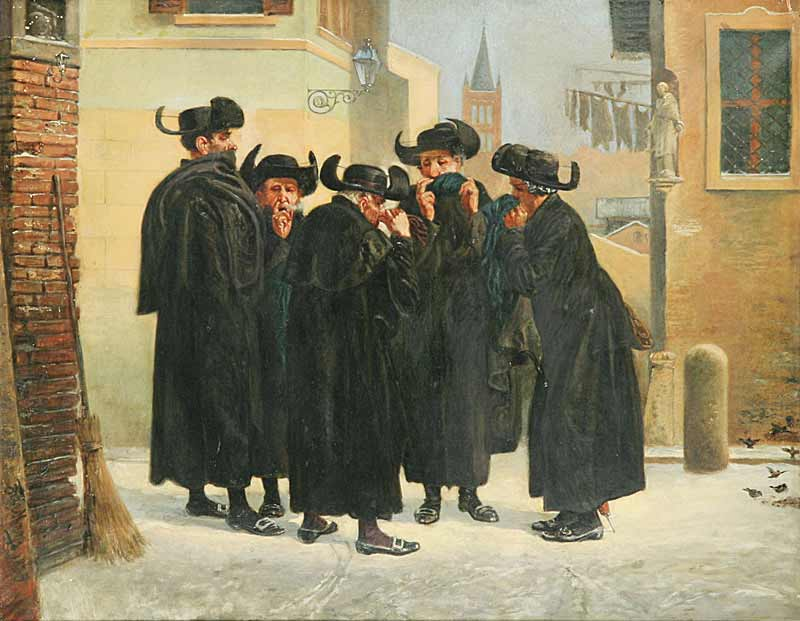
Jews Taking Snuff

Emanuel married in Verona in 1860 Maria Anna, daughter of Major General Josef Rudolph edle von Fris and Francisca born as an edle von Fries. They had seven children together, but only four lived to adulthood. Of the two sons and two daughters, only one daughter had child. Her descendants still live in the Czech Republic today.

Emanuel died on 10 December 1908, of bronchitis. He is buried at the Olšany Cemetery in Prague.
