= Spannocchi =

Coat of arms of the Spannocchi family, Pinacoteca Nazionale, Siena

The Spannocchi family is a prominent, historic Italian aristocratic family from Siena, Italy.

== History ==
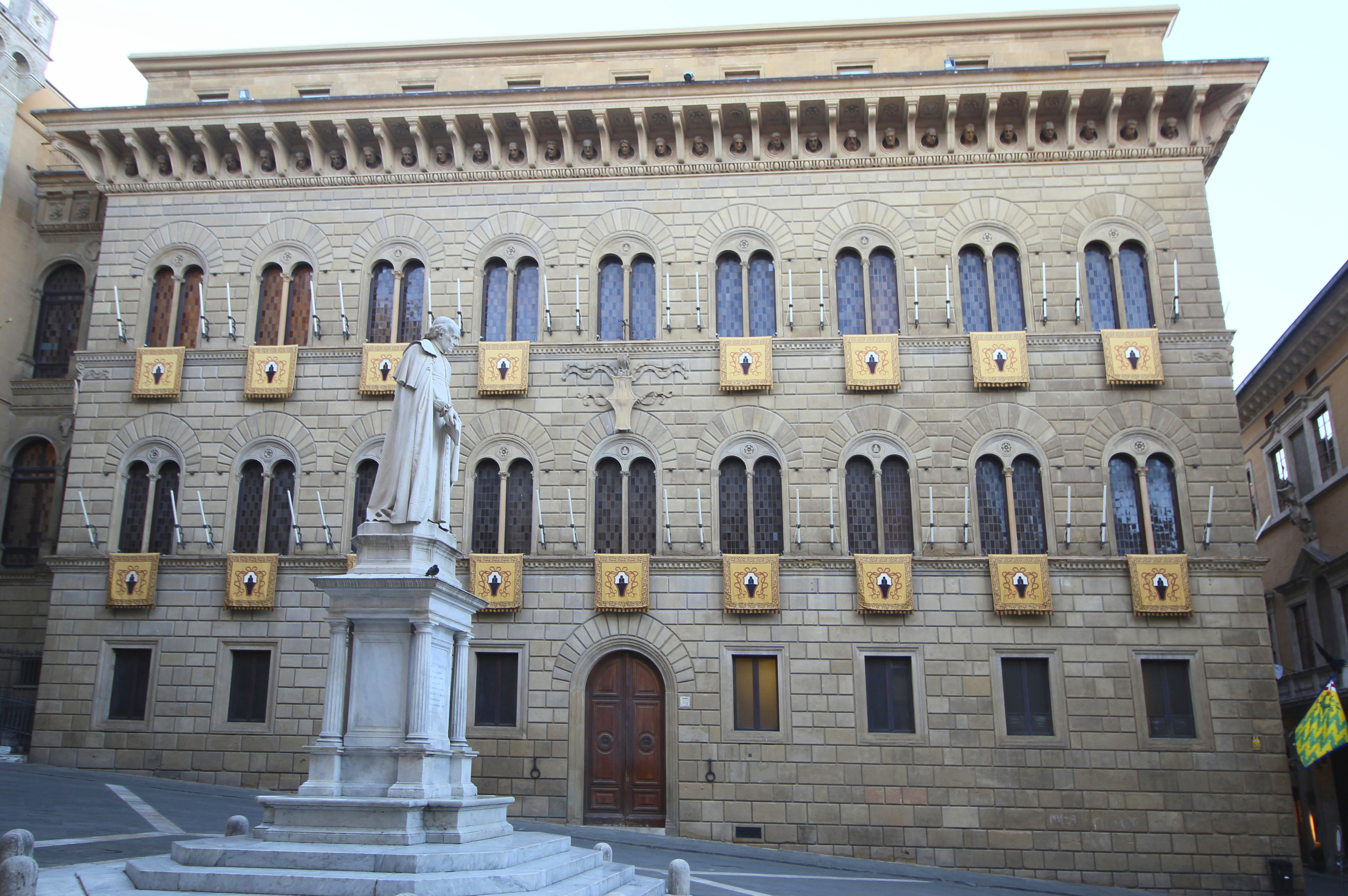
Spannocchi palace in Siena

The earliest written record of the Spannocchi family dates back to 1255. The family originally came from the small rural village of Spannocchia, located about 12 miles southwest of Siena. The family's first historical mention appears in a land document from that year, which records a man named Zacaria dei Spannocchi donating a piece of property to a nearby hermitage. Following this period, the family migrated to the urban center of Siena during the mid-13th century (around the 1250s), where they rapidly transitioned from their humble provincial roots into highly influential merchants and international bankers.

The family resided in the Palazzo Spannocchi, which was commissioned in 1473 by Ambrogio Spannocchi, Treasurer to Pope Pius II.

In 1774, the family merged with another iconic Sienese dynasty through the marriage of Caterina Piccolomini di Modanella and Giuseppe Spannocchi. This union brought together a massive art collection—including Renaissance paintings and treasures originally acquired from the Sack of Mantua. The reunited Piccolomini Spannocchi Collection is now on display at the Santa Maria della Scala museum complex in Siena.

The family's elevation to the high nobility of the Habsburg realms culminated when Peter Leopold Spannocchi was awarded the title of Count in Hungary by Francis I on May 1, 1825, a status formally confirmed in Austria on January 20, 1846, by Ferdinand I.

== Notable members ==
- Tiburzo or Tiburcio Spannocchi (1541–1609), chief engineer to kings Philip II and III of Spain
- Emil Spannocchi (1916–1992), Austrian military officer and military theorist
- Giovanni Bonaventura Spannocchi (1742–1832), Minister of Justice for Kingdom of Italy 1802–1805
- Angelo Spannocchi (died 1614), Sienese jurist
- Pandolfo Spannocchi (fl. 17th-century), expert in miniature writing and his grandson of the same name published a collection of poems in 1717

== See also ==
- Palazzo Spannocchi
