= Battle of Rawa =

World War I battle

- Part of the Eastern Front during World War I
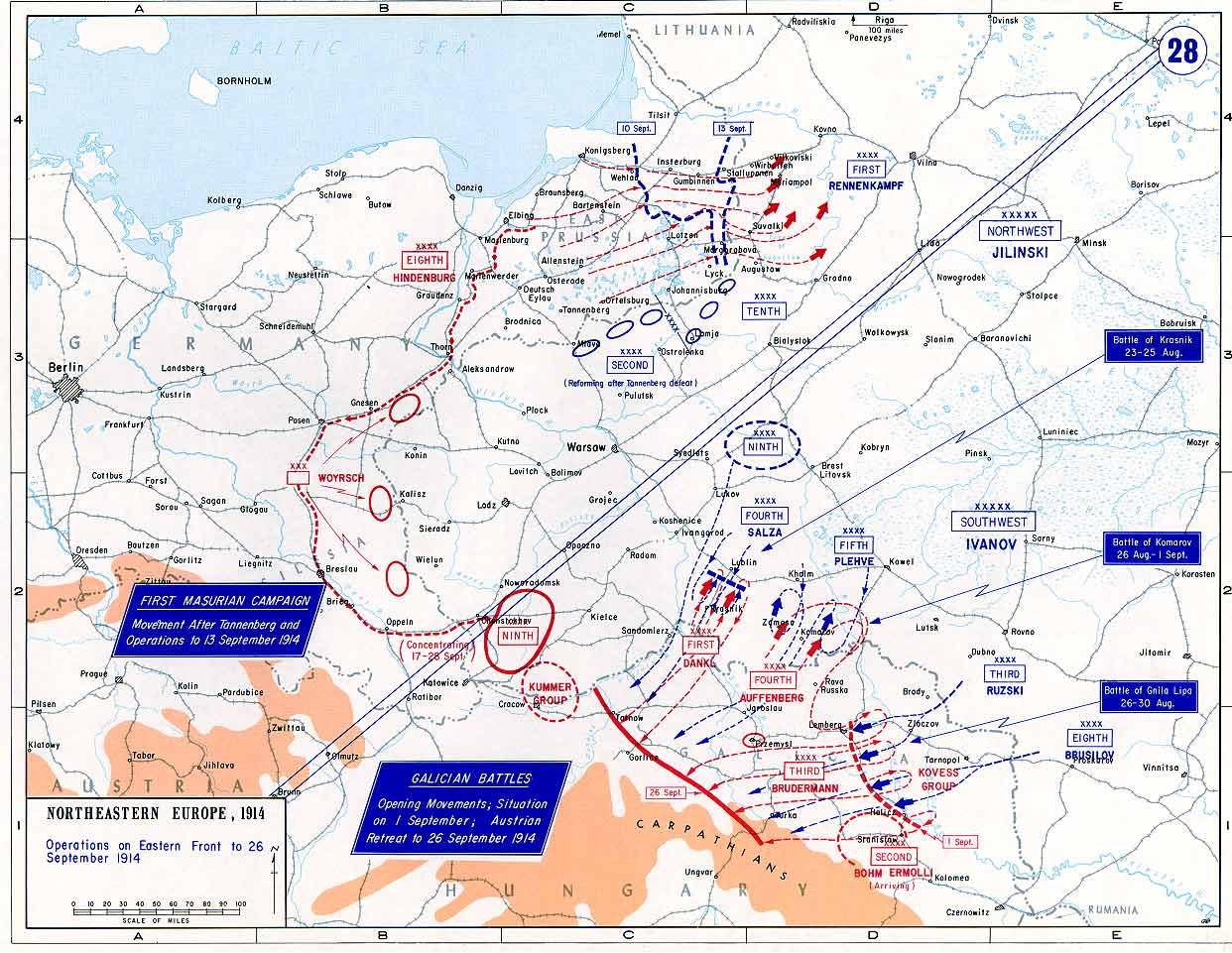
- Eastern Front, September 1914
Date	September 3–11, 1914
Location	Near Rava-Ruska, Austrian Poland (present-day Ukraine)
Result	Russian victory

Belligerents
Russian Empire	Austria-Hungary

Commanders and leaders
Pavel Plehve; Nikolai Ruzsky	(Austria-Hungary) Rudolf von Brudermann (Austria-Hungary) Moritz von Auffenberg

Units involved
3rd Army; 5th Army	(Austria-Hungary) 3rd Army (Austria-Hungary) 4th Army

Casualties and losses
60,000 casualties	350,000

Battle of Rawa (also written as -Rava, -Rawa-Ruska, -Rava-Ruska, or -Rava-Russka) was an early stage World War I battle between Austria-Hungary and Russia, from 3–11 September 1914. The Russian armies had defeated their opponents and pushed them back to the Carpathian Mountains. The battle was part of the series of engagements known as Battle of Galicia.

== Background ==
According to Prit Buttar, "Conrad issued further orders to prepare for what he hoped would be a decisive blow by Auffenberg's 4th Army. Leaving only four infantry divisions and two cavalry divisions facing north, under the collective command of Archduke Joseph Ferdinand, Auffenberg was to turn and march southeast. Meanwhile, Ivanov finally prevailed upon Ruzsky to turn northwest, so that he could march to the aid of Plehve's army. Unwittingly, the Russians and Austro-Hungarians thus created the circumstances that would lead to a head-on collision between Auffenberg's 4th Army and Ruzsky's 3rd Army." Auffenberg's IX, VI, and XVII Corps were located between Niemirów and Rawa Ruska. The Russian 3rd Army consisted of the 9th, 10th, 11th, and 21st Army Corps. On 6 September, the Austro-Hungarian XVII and VI Corps met the Russian 9th and 10th Army Corps respectively, while the Russian 21st Army Corps extended beyond the left flank of the Austro-Hungarians. At the same time, Plehve's 5th Army advanced to the south. Joseph Ferdinand now faced the Russian 21st Army Corps to the east, the Russian 5th Army to the north, while the Austro-Hungarian 1st Army retreated towards the south. Protecting the Austro-Hungarian 4th army's rear, Joseph Ferdinand located his men north of Rawa Ruska.

== Battle ==
On 8 September, fighting continued along Auffenberg's front, as the Austro-Hungarian 4th Army was in danger of being surrounded. Outnumbered two to one, the Austro-Hungarians continued to resist Russian advances, especially along Auffenberg's exposed northern flank. Joseph Ferdinand had only one division to block Plehve's Russian 5th and 17th Army Corps, advancing from Komarów. On 9 September, Auffenberg started his retreat westwards towards the River San.

== Aftermath ==
The Austro-Hungarian armies did not stop at the River San, instead retreating to the Dunajec and Biala Rivers, abandoning the Przemyśl Fortress to a Russian siege. On 29 September, Auffenberg received a letter from Archduke Frederick stating, "I call upon you to give to your Fatherland the greatest sacrifice that a soldier can be asked to make, that is, to report sick and to resign the command of the Fourth Army."

=== Rosa Zenoch ===
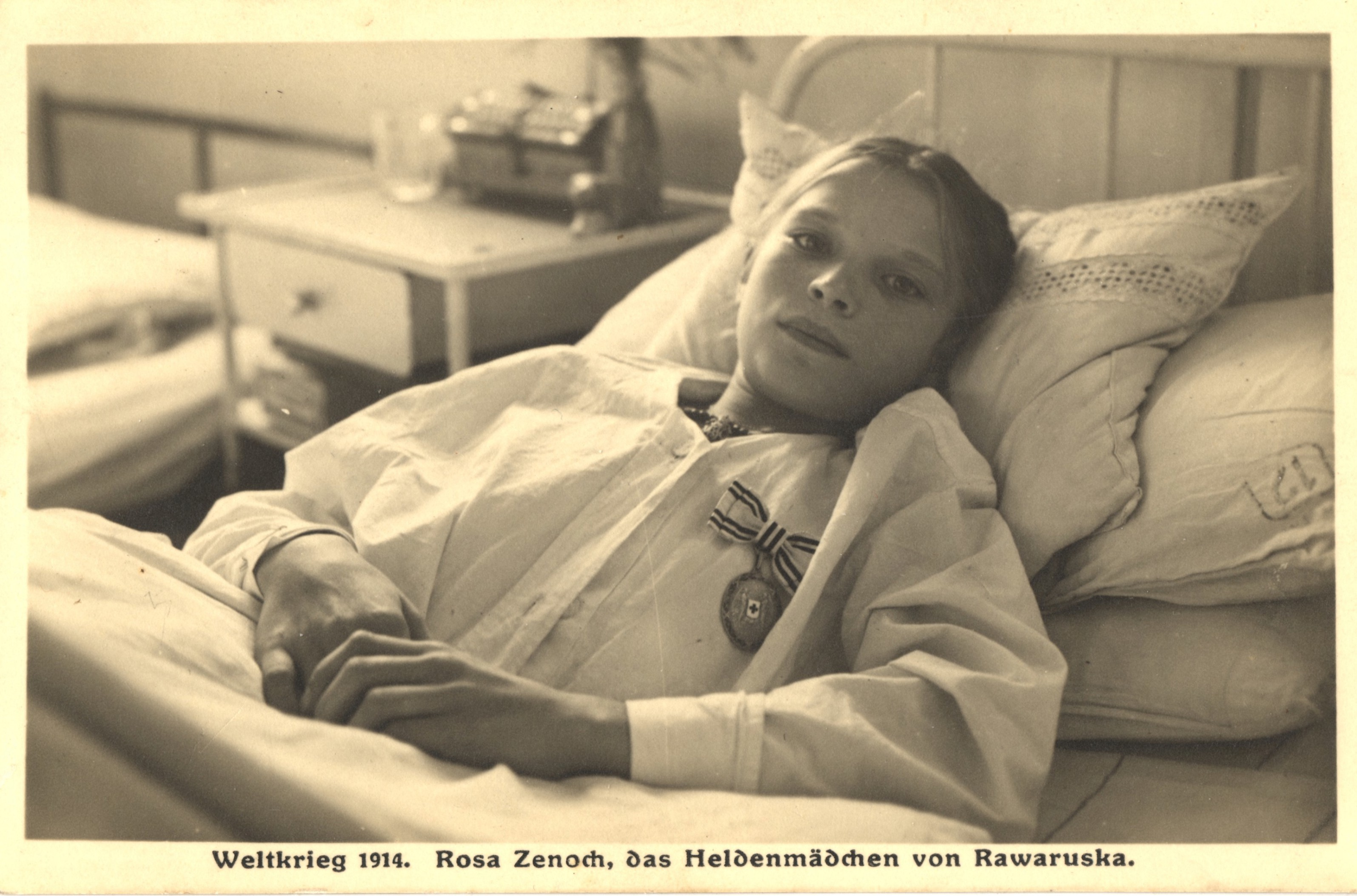
Image of Rosa Zenoch

Rosa Zenoch, sometimes spelled Zennoch or Hennoch, was an Austro-Hungarian girl, also known as "heroic girl of Rawaruska" ("das Heldenmächen von Rawaruska"), who is known for being injured in the Battle of Rawa. According to contemporary accounts saying that Zenoch was 12 years old she can be deduced to have been born around 1902. She was said to be daughter of a farmer in the village Byala in Rawa Ruska. Apparently her real name however was Rebekka Henoch. She had at least three siblings, one of them a brother who was enlisted in the army and stationed at Przemyśl Fortress

During the battle, Zenoch voluntarily brought water to wounded soldiers on the battlefield. After being injured, she was brought to Vienna accompanied by her mother, where her left leg had to be amputated. According to the historical narrative, Emperor Franz Joseph as well as other members of the Habsburg family visited her in the hospital and the emperor promised to pay for her prosthesic foot and gifted her a golden chain. Her mother was also gifted 1000 krona.

In historic photographs, she can be seen bearing the Decoration for Services to the Red Cross. It is unknown what happened to her after World War I.

== Additional reading ==
- Nicholas Golovin. "The Great Battle of Galicia, 1914: a Study in Strategy". Slavonic Review, vol. 5, 1926–27. (online: The Great Battle of Galicia - A study in strategy )
- Map of the Battle of Rawa
- Rickard, J. (23 February 2001), Battle of Rava Ruska, 3-11 September 1914
