= Rudolf von Brudermann =

Austro-Hungarian military officer during World War I

Ritter Rudolf von Brudermann
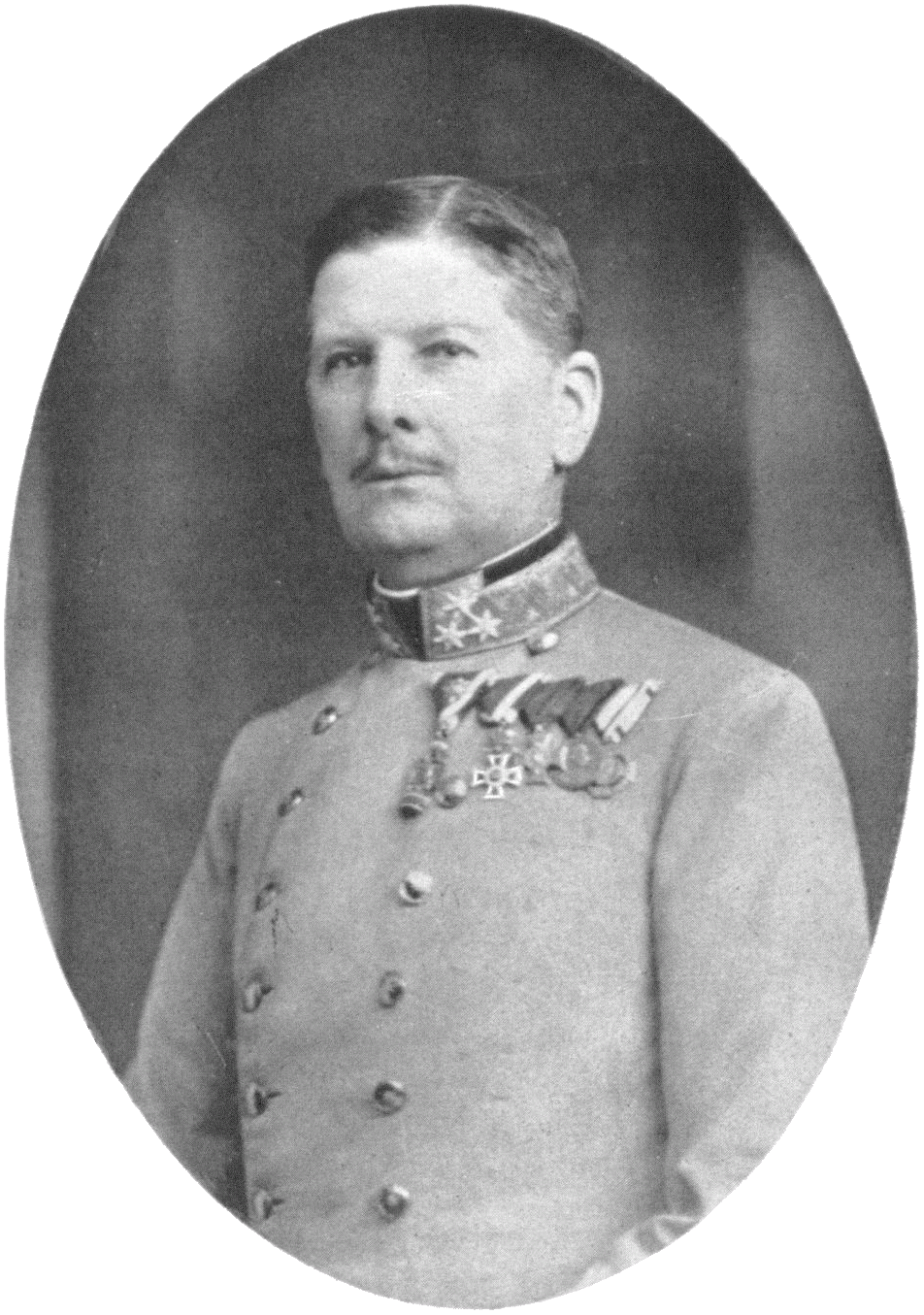
- Born: 9 January 1851; Gyöngyös, Kingdom of Hungary
- Died: 21 January 1941 (aged 90); Kaltenleutgeben, Austria
- Relatives: Adolf von Brudermann (brother)
- Military career
- Allegiance: (Austria-Hungary) Austro-Hungarian Army
- Service years: 1869–1878, 1879–1914
- Rank: General of the cavalry
- Commands: Royal Dragoon Regiment No. 14; 15th Cavalry Brigade; 7th Cavalry Division; Third Army
- Conflicts: World War I: Battle of Galicia; Battle of Gnila Lipa; Battle of Rawa
- Awards: Order of the Iron Crown First Class; Knight Grand Cross of the Order of Leopold

Rudolf Nikolaus Ritter von Brudermann (from 1919 Rudolf Brudermann; 9 January 1851 Gyöngyös, Hungary – 21 January 1941 Kaltenleutgeben, Lower Austria, Austria) was an Austro-Hungarian General der Kavallerie (general of the cavalry) during World War I. He led Austria-Hungary's Third Army during the Battle of Galicia.

== Personal life ==
Brudermann was a son of Generalmajor (Major General) Rudolf Johann von Brudermann (1810–1889) and his wife Gisela von Barbaczy (1815–1855). He had two brothers, Anton (1847–1881) and Adolf (1854–1945), and a sister, Gisela Elisabeth (1852–1917). His brothers also pursued a military career. He married Marie Albine, née Jürgens, on 2 July 1878. They had no children.

== Military career ==
Brudermann began his training at the Kadettenanstalt (Cadet Institute) in Hainburg an der Donau and attended the Theresian Military Academy in Wiener Neustadt from 1865 to 1869. On 1 September 1869 he was commissioned as a Leutnant (lieutenant) and assigned to Imperial and Royal Uhlan Regiment "Alexander II, Emperor of Russia" No. 11. On 1 May 1874 he was promoted to Oberleutnant (first lieutenant). After attending the war college in Vienna, he joined the general staff in 1874, and while there received a promotion to Hauptmann 1.Klasse im Generalstab (captain first class in the general staff) on 1 November 1877. At his own request, he was transferred on 1 April 1878 to the reserve list as a member of Imperial and Royal Uhlan Regiment "Prince of Schwarzenberg" No. 2 with the rank of Rittmeister first class. He married his wife on 2 July 1878 while in a reserve status.

On 1 January 1879, Brudermann returned to active service and was assigned to the Imperial and Royal Uhlan Regiment "Knights of Brudermann" No. 1. From 1880 to 1884 he acted as an instructor in the cavalry cadet school at Mährisch-Weißkirchen in Moravia and was then assigned to Imperial and Royal Dragoon Regiment "Prince to Windisch-Graetz" No. 14. While with this regiment, he received promotions to major on 1 November 1885 and to Oberstleutnant (lieutenant colonel) on 1 November 1888. He took over command of the regiment on 5 April 1891 and was promoted to Oberst (colonel) on 1 November 1891. He received the Order of the Iron Crown Third Class in March 1895, a standard award for three years of satisfactory service in command of a regiment.

In March 1897 Brudermann took command of the 15th Cavalry Brigade at Tarnopol, and on 18 May 1897 he was promoted to Generalmajor (major general). From March 1900 to the end of March 1904, he commanded the 7th Cavalry Division in Kraków. On 1 May 1901 he was promoted to Feldmarchalleutnant (lieutenant field marshal), and in April 1904 was honored with the Grand Cross of the Order of Leopold.

In July 1906, Brudermann took over the position of Imperial and Royal General Inspector of Cavalry, and he was promoted to General der Kavallerie (general of the cavalry) on 26 April 1907. While in this position, he received the honorary title of Oberstinhaber (colonel-proprietor) of Uhlan Regiment No. 1 in February 1907 and was awarded the Order of the Iron Crown 1st Class in August 1908.

Brudermann was an enthusiastic cavalry commander who had never seen combat and whose military experience was limited to maneuvers and what he had read in field manuals. As general inspector of cavalry, he was determined to retain the tactics and ethos of an earlier era even as warfare changed around him in the late 19th and early 20th century. He prevented any modernization of the cavalry force, rejecting all new weapons such as machine guns, and refusing to allow the cavalry to wear the hechtgrau ("pike gray") camouflage uniforms the rest of the army adopted. He viewed the use of camouflage as incompatible with heroism, and believed that cavalry forces of the early 20th century should fight as those of a century earlier had, charging into battle across open fields in colorful uniforms and wielding sabres in the face of enemy gunfire. Some senior officers, including the chief of the general staff, Franz Conrad von Hötzendorf, wished to replace Brudermann with someone who would see the need to modernize the cavalry for 20th-century warfare, and in October 1912 Brudermann was promoted to general inspector of the army to allow Karl Georg Reichsgraf von Huyn to take over as general inspector of cavalry. Despite this change, the Austro-Hungarian Army's cavalry force entered combat in World War I in late July 1914 still heavily influenced by Brudermann's beliefs.

=== World War I ===
On the eve of World War I, Brudermann was still general inspector of the army. In the Austro-Hungarian Army system, the officer in that position normally was the designate to take command of the army in the event of war, but Conrad did not view Brudermann as up to the task. Therefore, after mobilization began and World War I broke out with Austria-Hungary's declaration of war on Serbia on 28 July 1914, Conrad in August 1914 made Brudermann the commander of the Third Army in Eastern Galicia along the border with the Russian Empire.

During the Battle of Galicia, which opened the war with Russia, Conrad ordered Brudermann's army to take on a defensive role around Lemberg while the First and Fourth Armies went on the offensive against the Russians to the north of the Third Army. Brudermann had difficulties with his superiors at the Army High Command, and his troops suffered major defeats at the hands of Imperial Russian Army forces during the Battle of Komarów, particularly around Złoczów on 26–27 August 1914, and in the Battle of Gnila Lipa on 29–30 August 1914, resulting in enormous losses among Austro-Hungarian troops. After Lemberg fell to the Russians, he was dismissed from his post on 4 September 1914 shortly after the beginning of the Battle of Rawa. He left the army at his own request on 23 November 1914 and officially retired on 24 March 1915.

== Later life ==
Brudermann spent his retirement in Vienna. After the conclusion of World War I in 1918, and particularly after about 1930, his military mistakes and failures were largely forgotten in the First Austrian Republic, and he was a popular figure when he appeared in uniform at veterans events. In 1936, he was elected honorary president of the Vereinigung Alt Neustadt (Old Neustadt Association), the association of veterans from the Theresian Military Academy. Together with his wife, he is buried in the Vienna Central Cemetery in Vienna.

== Awards and honors ==
=== Austro-Hungarian ===
- Order of the Iron Crown Third Class (March 1895)
- Knight Grand Cross of the Order of Leopold (April 1904)
- Order of the Iron Crown First Class (August 1908)

=== Foreign ===
- Grand Cross of the Albert Order (Kingdom of Saxony, July 1905)
- Knight Grand Cross of the Royal Victorian Order (United Kingdom, February 1908)
- Order of the Crown (Kingdom of Württemberg, October 1908)
- Commander Grand Cross of the Order of the Sword (Sweden, February 1909)
- Order of the Red Eagle (Kingdom of Prussia, October 1909)
