= Adolf von Brudermann =

Austrian general

Ritter Adolf von Brudermann
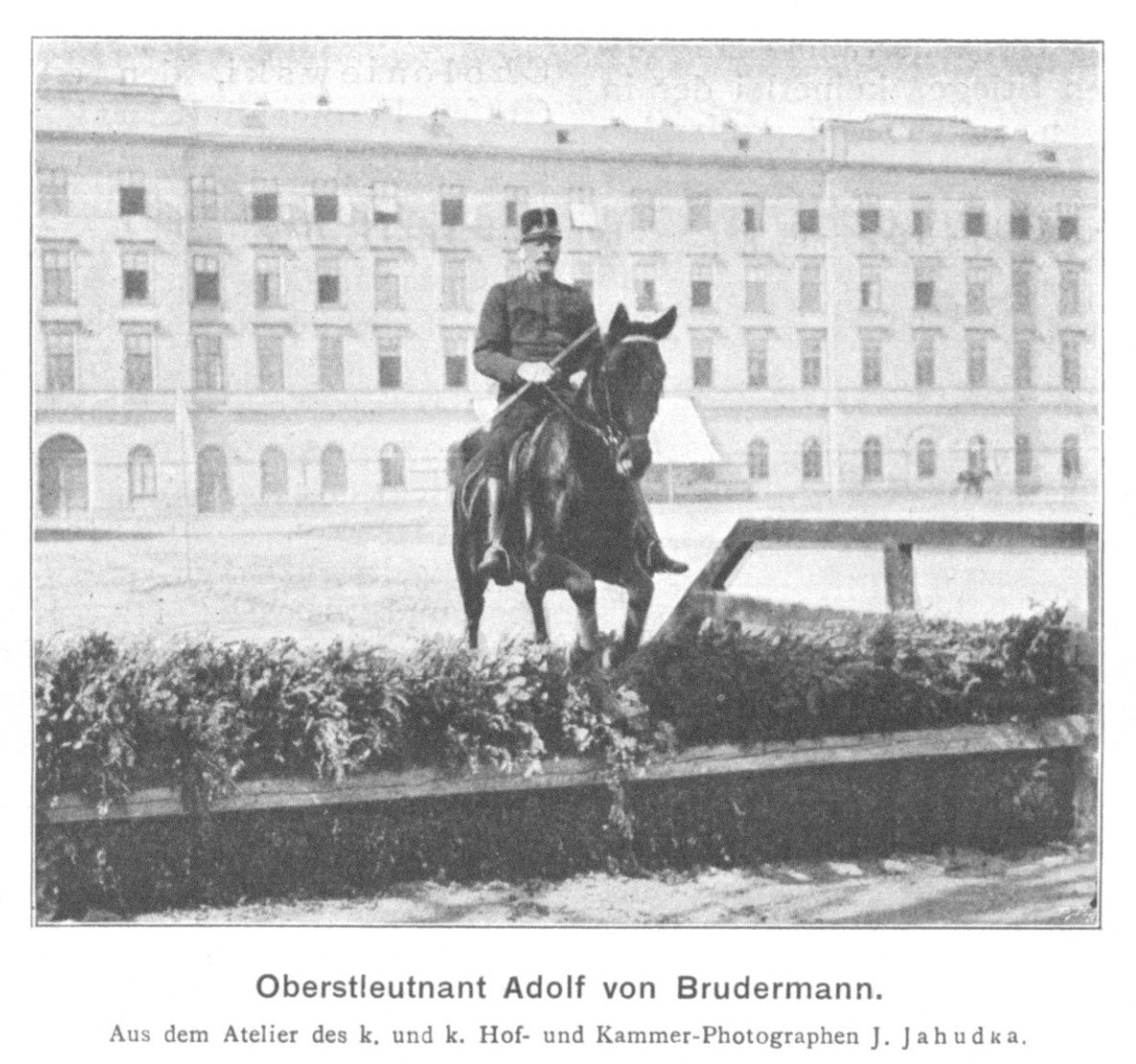
- Adolf von Brudermann on horseback in 1903
- Born: 2 June 1854; Vienna, Austrian Empire
- Died: 26 October 1945 (aged 91); Vienna, Republic of Austria
- Relatives: Rudolf von Brudermann (brother)
- Military career
- Allegiance: (Austria-Hungary) Austro-Hungarian Army
- Service years: 1874–1917
- Rank: General of the cavalry
- Nickname: "The Other Brudermann"
- Commands: 2nd Uhlan Regiment; 3rd Cavalry Brigade; 3rd Cavalry Division; Cavalry Corps Brudermann
- Conflicts: World War I
- Awards: Order of the Iron Crown Second Class; Commander's Cross of the Order of Leopold; Military Merit Cross Second Class; Bronze Military Merit Medal (Signum Laudis)

Adolf von Brudermann (2 June 1854 Vienna – 26 October 1945 Vienna) was a General der Kavallerie (general of the cavalry) of the Austro-Hungarian Army. He saw service during World War I.

== Personal life ==
Brudermann was the youngest of the four children of Generalmajor (Major General) Rudolf Johann von Brudermann (1810–1889) and his wife Gisela von Barbaczy (1815–1855), who had two other sons, Anton (1847–1881) and Rudolf (1851–1941), and a daughter, Gisela Elisabeth (1852–1917). His brothers also pursued a military career. On 6 March 1886 he married Franziska Juliane (née Strzygowski) in Biala Amalie, with whom he had three daughters and a son.

== Military career ==
Brudermann began his military training at the Kadettenanstalt (Cadet Institute) in Marburg an der Drau and then, as his two older brothers had done previously, entered the Theresian Military Academy in Wiener Neustadt in 1869. In 1874 he completed his studies at the academy and entered service as a Leutnant (lieutenant) with Uhlan Regiment No. 1. After receiving promotions to Oberleutnant (first lieutenant) on 1 May 1879 and Hauptmann 2.Klasse (captain second class) on 1 November 1889 and an award of the Knight's Cross First Class of the Albert Order from the Kingdom of Saxony, he became an instructor at the military riding school — the training school for riding instructors — on 1 May 1890. He remained there, with the exception of a few interruptions for service with the 1st Uhlan Regiment between 1894 and April 1899 — until 20 July 1904. He became a well-known riding instructor, and received both the Military Merit Cross Third Class in 1894 and the Bronze Military Merit Medal (Signum Laudis) in September 1904 for his success as an instructor. He also received a number of awards from foreign governments — the Royal Order of the Crown Third Class from the Kingdom of Prussia in April 1893, the Order of the White Elephant Fourth Class from Siam in January 1898, the Order of the Red Eagle Third Class from the Kingdom of Prussia in October 1898, the Officer's Cross of the Order of Orange-Nassau from the Netherlands in December 1903, and the Commander's Cross of the Order of the Crown of Italy from the Kingdom of Italy in January 1904 — in recognition of his horsemanship.

After he was promoted to major on 1 May 1897 and to Oberstleutnant (lieutenant colonel) on 1 November 1900, Brudermann's tour as an instructor at the riding school finally ended when he became the commanding officer of the 2nd Uhlan Regiment at the end of July 1904. On 5 November 1904, he was promoted to Oberst (colonel). As was customary, he received the Order of the Iron Crown Third Class in August 1908 after three years of satisfactory leadership of his regiment.

In April 1910, Brudermann took command of the 3rd Cavalry Brigade in Marburg an der Drau, and he was promoted to Generalmajor (major general) on 28 October 1910. He was appointed commander of the 3rd Cavalry Division in Vienna in June 1913, and on 3 November 1913 he was promoted to Feldmarschalleutnant (lieutenant field marshal). Achieving this rank and the command of a division was extremely unusual for an officer who had not attended the war college. Under normal circumstances, this achievement would have been the peak of his career and he would have retired after 40 years of service, but the outbreak of World War I extended his military career.

=== First World War ===
After World War I began with Austria-Hungary's declaration of war on Serbia on 28 July 1914, Brudermann remained the commander of the 3rd Cavalry Division. In June 1916, while retaining command of the division, he also became the commanding officer of Cavalry Corps Brudermann, which was established that month. It suffered terrible losses in combat and was disbanded in August 1916. In October 1916, again while remaining in command of the 3rd Cavalry Division, he raised a new Cavalry Corps Brudermann, but it was disbanded in November 1916, again due to heavy losses. His deteriorating health forced him to give up his command of the 3rd Cavalry Division at the end of 1916 and to apply for retirement, which was approved in March 1917. He retired with the rank of General der Kavallerie mit Titel und Charakter ("general of the cavalry with title and character").

== Later life ==
After retiring, Brudermann withdrew from public life. He lived in seclusion in Vienna near his brother Rudolf — also a retired General der Kavallerie and a popular figure at veterans events — and became known as “the other Brudermann." He died on 26 October 1945, shortly after the end of World War II. He was buried in Vienna at the Vienna Central Cemetery.

== Awards and honors ==
=== Austro-Hungarian ===
- Military Merit Cross Third Class (1894)
- Bronze Military Merit Medal (Signum Laudis) (September 1904)
- Order of the Iron Crown Third Class (August 1908)
- Order of the Iron Crown Second Class with war decoration (30 October 1914)
- Military Merit Cross Second Class with war decoration (22 September 1915)
- Commander's Cross of the Order of Leopold with war decoration (March 1917)

=== Foreign ===
- Knight's Cross First Class of the Albert Order (Kingdom of Saxony)
- Royal Order of the Crown Third Class (Kingdom of Prussia, April 1893)
- Order of the White Elephant Fourth Class (Siam, January 1898)
- Order of the Red Eagle Third Class (Kingdom of Prussia, October 1898)
- Officer's Cross of the Order of Orange-Nassau (Netherlands, December 1903)
- Commander's Cross of the Order of the Crown of Italy (Kingdom of Italy, January 1904)
- Royal Order of the Crown First Class (Kingdom of Prussia, 27 July 1914)
- Iron Cross Second Class (German Empire, March 1915)
