= Camilla von Habsburg-Lothringen =

Archduchess Camilla of Habsburg-Lorraine
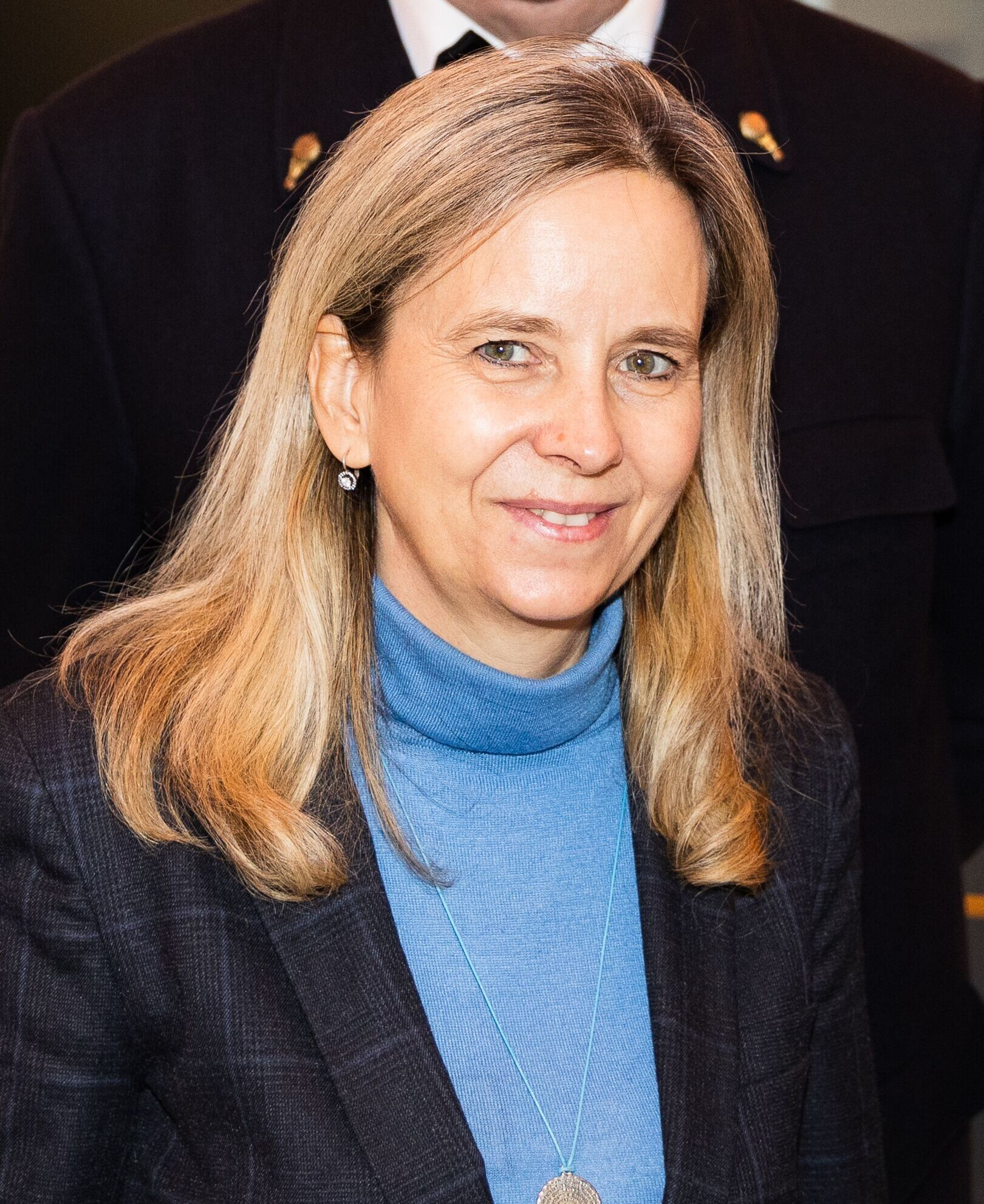
- Camilla von Habsburg-Lothringen, 2019
- Born: Maria Camilla von Habsburg-Lothringen; 29 May 1962 (age 64); Wimbledon, GB
- House: Habsburg-Lorraine
- Father: Maximilian Franz Joseph Karl Otto Heinrich von Habsburg-Lothringen, Prince of Florence
- Mother: Doris Mary Howard Williams

Camilla von Habsburg-Lothringen, Archduchess of Austria and Princess of Tuscany, born on 29. May 1962 in Wimbledon, London is an Austrian public figure and philanthropist from the House of Habsburg.

== Personal life ==
She is the only child of Maximilian Habsburg-Lothringen (1932-2024), Archduke of Austria and Prince of Florence, son of Archduke Joseph Ferdinand of Austria, and his wife Doris Mary Howard Williams. She descends from the Tuscan line of the Habsburgs. She is based in Vienna and active in PR and communications industry.

== Professional work ==
She consciously chose the cultural field over a political career in order to contribute to a better world, believing that culture enables better and faster dialogue than administrations can. In 2016, she was appointed Director for Euro-Mediterranean Diplomacy and Intercultural Affairs at the International Institute for Middle-East and Balkan Studies and had the function till 2020. She served as Honorary Ambassador of the IDEA Society, founded by Philanthropist Stefan Stoev. Camilla Habsburg has been strongly committed to intercultural and interreligious dialogue as well as environmental protection projects in Bosnia and Herzegovina. She is on the board of the UN Youth Organization ECOSOC, serves as General Secretary of the Austro-Mexican Society In April 2026 she was speaker at the Mafra-Dialoges, organized by the KAICIID Dialogue Centre.

== Honours and awards ==
In June 2024, Camilla Habsburg-Lothringen was honored by The Abrahamic Business Circle during their Investors Roundtable in Vienna. She received an award for her outstanding contributions to cultural diplomacy. The organization highlighted her dedication to fostering mutual respect and understanding across different cultures.

=== Dynastic ===
- (Austria-Hungary) House of Habsburg-Lorraine:
  - Honorary Dame of the Order of Saint George
- (Kingdom of the Two Sicilies) House of Bourbon-Two Sicilies:
  - Dame of the Two Sicilian Royal Sacred Military Constantinian Order of Saint George
- (Kingdom of Italy) House of Savoy:
  - Dame of the Great Cross of Royal Order of Saints Maurice and Lazarus
