= Nin Brudermann =

Austrian artist

- Born: 1970 (age 55–56); Vienna, Austria
- Education: Schule Friedl Kubelka (BFA); University of Vienna; Academy of Fine Arts Vienna (MA)
- Website: www.ninbrudermann.com

Nin Brudermann is an Austrian artist, born in Vienna, living in New York since her studio Artist Residency at MOMA PS1. Her works are narrative investigations in a variety of media, including film and sculpture as well as performative installations. Brudermann often adopts comedic elements and methods of play for politically charged subject matter.

Brudermann's work has been presented internationally at MOMA PS1, Brooklyn Museum, Venice Biennale, Kunsthal Aarhus, Kunsthalle Wien and Kunsthalle Krems, Haus der Kunst, Kunstraum Dornbirn, National Centre for Contemporary Art.

== Education ==
Brudermann received her BFA at Schule Friedl Kubelka in Vienna and her MA at University of Vienna and Academy of Fine Arts Vienna (Peter Sloterdijk).

== Works ==
‘Waiting for War’ (1998)

Waiting for War displays undisclosed satellite uplinks by Reuters, APTN, CNN, and Al-Jazeera during 'Operation Desert Fox’, in a four channel synchronized video installation.

’N.A.S.D. Projekt Fledermaus’ (2004)

N.A.S.D. Projekt Fledermaus takes place on the Caribbean island of Vieques, a former United States Navy bombing range and testing ground, where in 2004 a large area was still off-limits to the public. Brudermann joined a scientific team to test the toxicity levels of dust, swab sampled from bats inhabiting the empty bunkers. The two channel video, part documentary, part performance piece, has been compared to a portrait of ‘The Zone’ - the toxic landscape of Andrey Tarkovsky's Stalker.

The Swan (2005)

The Swan is an urban tale in which a swan attempts to make its home in the East River of New York City. As a live performance, the short film is narrated by Brudermann in storybook style, accompanied by Dorit Chrysler on the theremin.

Panspermia (2005)

In the interactive mixed media-installation Panspermia, Brudermann touches on the politicized battle between darwinism and intelligent design by reciting panspermian commandments from a book on directed panspermia. The work was acquired by the Austrian National Collection, Arthotek at Belvedere.

Das Patent (2008)

In Das Patent Brudermann's practice is that of the conceptual artist as inventor with a patented unitard that separates into two sections without the use of hooks or buttons and that art critic Jerry Saltz compared to a M.C. Escher impossible object. The figurations of Das Patent were live performed at Peter Blum Gallery in New York.

Aurelio Z: The Game (2008)

Court documents on the Superdollar are at the center of Aurelio Z: The Game, a live performed Q&A show with the audience competing against the players on stage.

Late Night Show (2010)

Brudermann turned the story of a woman who had been stalking a man for six years into a Late Night Show with Danish TV host Martin Krasnik.

Tarock N.B. (2013)

A person's personal history was also Brudermann's focus in Tarock N.B.. The life of a CIA agent can be discovered through a patience/tarock card game created by the artist. For Performa 13 she played Tarock N.B. with Dieter Meier at White Box NY.

Twelve O'Clock in London (2012)

Besides the immersion in other roles and lives the artist finds herself in foreign places. For Twelve O’Clock in London Brudermann travelled for years to the remotest sites to document and intervene in a daily global event of the United Nations. At UTC noon and midnight all member states launch weather balloons synchronously in a political ritual for the sake of the weather forecast.

For the Makrolab contribution to the Venice Biennale 2003 Brudermann collaborated with the Italian Air Force who cleared the airspace over Venice to launch a balloon equipped with a radio transmitting video camera into near space. With Twelve O’Clock in London Brudermann has collected and collaged 150 videos of rising meteorological balloons launched from all nations across the globe. In 2009 the artist was invited to the World Climate Conference in Geneva by the World Meteorological Organization of the United Nations to present her film at a special screening for Heads of States and Governments at Victoria Hall Geneva. In a performative act she introduced the Secretary-General of the United Nations Ban Ki-moon to her project. Brudermann managed to ask the Secretary-General whether he could say which border-crossing action is performed twice every day and represents a nation-collaborative act by the United Nations. Ban Ki-moon had to leave this question unanswered, but after this short intervention ordered a ballon signed by the artist. Twelve O’Clock in London was later part of UNESCO 70 at the 2015 United Nations Climate Change Conference in Paris, featured at Rolling Stone Magazine. The project culminated in a 150-channel video installation at Kunsthalle Krems and a performative contest of nations at REGIONALE XII and Kunstraum Dornbirn , with an exhibition catalog published by Verlag für moderne Kunst.

For Twelve O’Clock in London Nin Brudermann received the InFocus Labs for the Arts Grant, the Individual Artist Film & Media Grant by the New York State Council on the Arts, with fiscal sponsorship of the New York Foundation for the Arts, the Arts & Humanities Grant by The Greenwall Foundation New York, as well as a Fellowship for the Arts by the Australian Antarctic Division. The work was awarded as part of the Outstanding Artist Awards Interdisciplinary 2016 by the Austrian Federal Chancellery.

Clash of Giants, 2014-2018

In her most recent work Clash of Giants Brudermann traces a cold case of high level espionage by means of unpublished correspondence around a dispute between her great-granduncle Rudolf von Brudermann and the head of the Austrian Chief of General Staff Franz Conrad von Hötzendorf. The production and research phase of Clash of Giants was presented at Museumsqartier Vienna in 2015, National Centre for Contemporary Arts Kaliningrad in 2017, Artist House Tel Aviv and Motorenhalle Dresden 2018.

== Further reading and external links ==
- Official website
- Wien Museum, 2018-7-10, ’Die 90er Jahre’, De Gruyter Verlag, ISBN 978-3-1105-7462-3, 2018
- ‘Nin Brudermann: nb’, Verlag fuer Moderne Kunst 2014, ISBN 978-3-86984-117-5
- ‘Media Power and The Transformation of War’, Palgrave Macmillan 2012, Chiara de Franco
- The Thing, 2005-6, ‘Nin Brudermann Investigates’, Arfus Greenwood
- ‘Handlungsanweisungen - Instructions for Actions’, Kunsthalle Wien, Katalog, Gerald Matt (Ed.) Steidl Verlag Goettingen 2004
