= Emil Spannocchi =

- Born: 1 September 1916; Salzburg-Aigen, Austria-Hungary (now Austria)
- Died: 29 August 1992 (aged 75); Wiener Neustadt, Austria
- Military career
- Allegiance: First Austrian Republic (1934–1938); Nazi Germany (1938–1945); Austria (1954–1981)
- Branch: Bundesheer; Wehrmacht
- Service years: 1934–1938, 1954–1981 (Austria); 1938–1945 (Germany)
- Rank: General (Austria); Major (Germany)

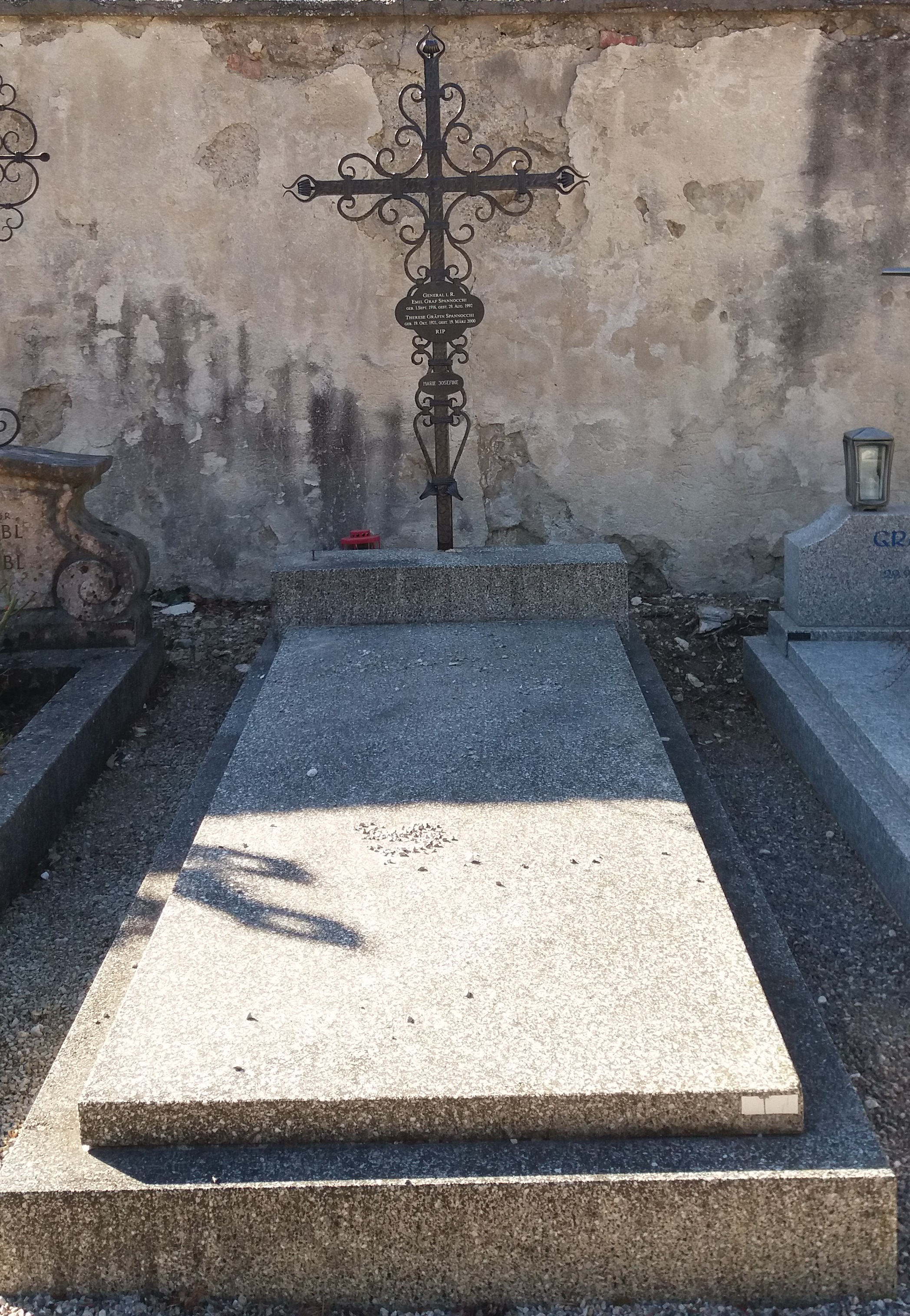
Emil Spannocchi's grave in the Theresian Military Academy Cemetery, Wiener Neustadt

Emil Spannocchi (1 September 1916 – 29 August 1992) was an Austrian military officer and military theorist. He reached the apex of his career as a general in the Austrian Armed Forces.

== Biography ==
Emil Spannocchi was born into a Spannocchi noble family on 1 September 1916 in Salzburg.

He joined the military of the First Austrian Republic in 1934 and started to attend the Theresian Military Academy in 1935. Following the Anschluss, he was transferred to the Wehrmacht and received his commission as a second lieutenant. At the beginning of World War II, Spannocchi commanded a platoon that took part in the Invasion of Poland, in the course of which he was promoted to a first lieutenant. After various positions at both Eastern and Western Front and being wounded twice, he was captured by American forces in late April and became prisoner of war until June 1945.

After the war, Spannocchi worked in the private sector for several years, until he decided to join the proto-military of Allied-occupied Austria, the B-Gendarmerie. Therein, he assisted the re-establishment of the Bundesheer as the successor of the B-Gendarmerie. In 1956, by then having reached the rank of a lieutenant colonel, he worked in the central office of the Austrian ministry of defense in Vienna. In 1957, he was appointed commander of the Armored Troops School, 1960 as commander of the 9th Armored Brigade and from 1963 until 1973 head of the National Defense Academy of Austria.

== Military theory ==
Spannocchi developed what was known as the doctrine of Raumverteidigung (lit. "space defense"), a variant of partisan warfare, inspired by Clausewitz and akin to the concept of Protracted People's War, developed by Mao Zedong, and the strategy of the Yugoslav Partisans, albeit missing their specific political contents. Utilizing partisan tactics of a war of attrition or popular resistance, but also mobilizing scare-tactics, a small, neutral Austria could defend its sovereignty against both NATO and the Eastern bloc. Spannocchi's doctrine was the leading military doctrine of the Austrian Armed Forces for more than 20 years, until the end of the cold war made armed conflict in Europe very unlikely, and resulted in the construction of expansive bunker complexes and fortifications throughout most of Austria, particularly its Alpine part.
