= Salomons of Friedberg =

The Salomon family of Friedberg (Czech: Salomonové z Friedbergu, German: Salomon von Friedberg, Latin: Salomon de Friedberg) is a Silesian family which originated in Frýdek in Silesia during the 16th century.

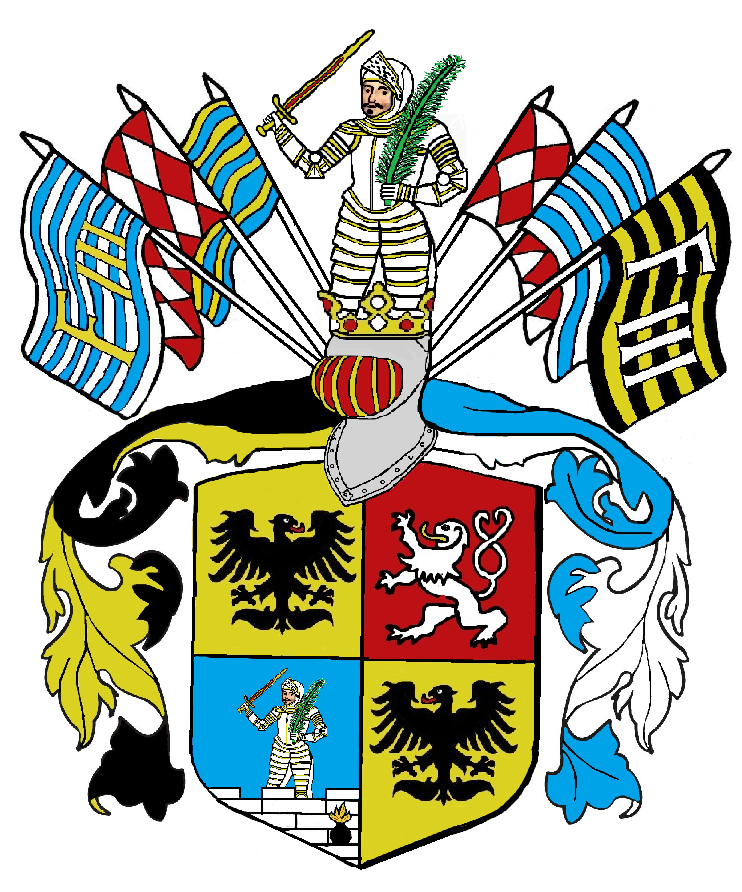
erb Václava Mořice Salomona von Friedberg

== Etymology ==
At first, when all the family members resided in Frýdek, they used the surname Šalamoun or Šalomun (written as Ssalomon and Ssalomun), inspired by biblical King Solomon of Israel, famous for his wisdom. When the family left Frýdek, they have customized their surname to follow two customs of that time. Firstly, they began to use the second part of their surname, which in that case wasn’t a particle (With the possible exception of Václav Mořic SvF.), but served simply as a place of origin (Fried-berg – Frýdek Hill). And secondly, they moved into German speaking region and thus began to use germanised surname. Šalomon changed to Salomon von Friedberg in German and Salomon de Friedberg in Latin (In many written phonetical variations.). In the 20th century, when nobiliary particles became forbidden, the family members began to use simple surname Friedberg (With the exception of descendants from the second line living in Canada, who still continue to use the full Latin version.).

== Ennoblement ==
The Salomon family of Friedberg wasn’t of noble origin; back in Frýdek they were members of bourgeoisie and thus were not noble but still free of serfdom. Václav Mořic Salomon of Friedberg did approach nobility, after being awarded with a coat of arms and a title of vladyka (country gentleman) sometime between 1648 – 1650 for his military accomplishments against the Swedes, but nevertheless continued as a politically active member of bourgeoisie.

This knowledge eventually faded and the family members living in the first half of the 19th century in Prague did assume they were of noble descent, used coat of arms and have begun to pursue their family history. Many mistakes were made, but request for confirmation, lacking potent evidence, was filled in and subsequently approved in 1863. A most unusual and strange thing happened as the entire family became ex facto ennobled. Confirmation of nobility happened once again in 1865 for another branch of family (descended from the first line). In 1884 was Emanuel Salomon von Friedberg-Mírohorský elevated as a Freiherr (baronet) and also his coat of arms was enhan ced.

== Heraldry ==
Matyáš Václav Salomon of Friedberg sealed official correspondence with a signet showing his personal coat of arms. Only five exemplars of this correspondence survived into today with no other known representation in existence, hence making it problematic to read the arms. Recognisable is the charge in shape of a bird, mantling and a single feather.

Václav Mořic Salomon z Friedbergu had his own coat of arms, different to his elder brother’s. Again, there are only few signet seals, but when the family requested for conformation of nobility in 1863, attached to it was a sketch allegedly copied from a document from 1656. Why is there a charge of lion passant in the document and a lion rampant presented on seals remains a question. Notwithstanding that, the request was granted and since 1863 was the family’s coat of arms bearing the charge of Václav Mořic, the lion passant.

Blazon (Into Czech translated from Germane language by prof. PhDr. Jan Županič, Ph.D., into English language translated from Czech language by PhDr. Jiří Zeman, Ph.D.)

A shield quartered: first and fourth or, an eagle sable, red langued, facing centre; second gules, a lion passant forchée argent; third azure, mur argent masoned sable, thereon a knight affronté armed cap-à-pie argent bordé or, wearing helm ouvert, brandishing a sword ardent proper and in sinister hand a palm branch vert, to the left of him exploding grenade hitting the wall. Thereupon tilting helmet with mantling sable and or, and azure and argent; crest of knight rising from shield between six banners (3:3) on poles argent with points argent; dexter first barre argent and azure with text argent “F III,” dexter second lozengy gules and argent, dexter third barre or and azure; sinister first barre sable and or with text argent “F III,” sinister second barre azure and or, sinister third lozengy argent and gules.

It is necessary to add, that different blazons and illustrations can be found in the literature. The difference is mostly in tinctures of third field concerning the wall, tinctures of mantling and blazon of banners (tinctures of fields and tinctures of text).

== Family’s history ==
The Šalomon family lived provably in Frýdek in the 16th century and from the style of historical records it can be assumed that the surname Šalomon appeared right in that time

The oldest written record is from 7 June 1541 and concerns Bartoš Šalomon, then local elder, about whom we know not more. Second person is Jan Šalomon, farmer, he died between 1580 and 1663. Third person is Martin Šalomon, father of five and apparently victim to a great fire in 1592. Other was Václav Šalomon Sr., who greatly enlarged the family’s fortune by real estate trading, and died between 1607 and 1614.

More information is known about Václav Šalomon Jr. Born before 1588, he became a town councilmember in Frýdek in 1615, 1616 and 1627. As it was an honorary position, his main trade was cobblery. As a cobbler he was skilful enough to become a renowned master craftsman and in 1625 elected the guild leader. As his father before him, he also multiplied his wealth by estate trading, but at that time life Frýdek was a series of catastrophes – fires, plague, military situations, all of those were grave complications and when Václav Younger died in 1628 or 1629 his widow got in a matter of years into financial problems. Perhaps that was the reason why their sons left Frýdek in search of careers elsewhere.

Václav Mořic, born in 1625, had more successful career. He fought against the Swedes, became a councilmember of Old Town Prague. But the line bearer was his elder brother Matyáš Václav, born in 1618. Matyáš served as high ranking official to Hanuš Zikmund Freiherr Petřvaldský of Petřvald at his castle Buchlov and later in Horní Moštěnice and the region of Přerov in general. He spent his last years in Frýdek and died there in 1681.

Last traces of Salomons of Frýdek disappear with the year 1685. Descendants of Matyáš Václav – Rudolf Jan (Died between 1701 and 1723.), Jan Antonín Sr. (Born 1682, died after 1734.), and Jan Antonín Jr. (Died between 1742 and 1745.), all worked as high officials in service to nobility (Knight Jan Ondřej Kotvic of Kotvic and Hostouň, Jan Bartoloměj Freiherr Vernier of Rougemont, Count Ferdinand Rudolf of Valdštejn, Count Kornel, Count Karel Jáchym Breda and Count Pöetting-Persing.). That had its advantages. Their standing, influenced also by them living in their mostly newly renovated employers’ residences, brought the Salomons huge respect. On the other hand, their lives were quite erratic and difficult for us to follow.

Another famous family member was Josef Anton Karl (1740 – 1825). He began his career, as did his ancestors, in official service on dominion Citoliby owned by Ernest Karel, count Pachta of Rájov, but as first of his family left his home country and crossed the borders of Bohemia. His first employers were counts Pálffy of Erdőd, whom he served as a tax collector in Slovakian Stupava. Between the years 1799 to 1808 he moved his family to Kraków in Halič (Galicia). There the family split into three lines.

Founder of the first line was Ernst Johann (1774 – 1854), deputy mayor of Lviv. His descendants spread to Poland, Austria and through Belgium to France. From this line comes e.g. major general Edmund Salomon von Friedberg (1814 - 1897), lieutenant field marshal Ernst Salomon von Friedberg (1854 - 1945) or painter Sibylle Woletz.

The second line was founded by Johann Nepomuk Stephan (1791 – 1865), cameral administrator in Bolechiv in today’s Ukraine. His descendants continue to live in Poland and Ukraine even today. Also important is a Canadian branch. Between his descendants are e.g.: Wilhelm Salomon de Friedberg- governor of Mościska, polish palaeontologist Wilhelm Friedberg, or his nephew, historian Marian Friedberg, former deputy foreman of Kraków a state secretary in ministry of transportation and maritime economy Jan Stanisław Friedberg or metallurgist Henry Salomon de Friedberg.

The last, third, line originates from August Ignác (1795 – 1880) economy councillor, who followed his father back into Bohemia. His son was, perhaps together after only Václav Mořic, one of the most important in the Salomon family - lieutenant field marshal, painter, writer and propagator of healthy lifestyle, Emanuel Salomon von Friedberg-Mírohorský. But as it was with Václav Mořic, neither him nor Emanuel had any male heirs. Other descendants of August Ignác still continue to live in Croatia, Romania, Slovenia, Lithuania, but also in Austria, France and Germany and amongst them lieutenant colonel Gustav Friedberg or sociologist Erhard Friedberg.

== Religion ==
Since 1528 (factually since 1540) the dominion of Frýdek was owned by Václav III. Adam of Těšín, who greatly contributed to the town’s growth, was a Lutheran and enforced this confession throughout his domains. Most of the city dwellers attended church, administrated by the Lutheran priests until 1581. We can’t prove whether Salomons were amongst them, or simply commuted to nearby Místek and his Roman Catholic Church, but with the exception of this brief time to the modern days, they were always sworn Catholics.

== Politics of marriage ==
Salomons of Friedberg used their social status throughout the history to enhance their standing even more by marrying their sons with daughters from both important and noble families. In the oldest times it was merely with prominent families from Frýdek like Cvala, Šajer and Brumovsky. Amongst the nobles were knights Kotvicové of Kotvic and Hostouň, barons Goubau de Corbeck-Dyle, counts Lažansky of Buková, Waagnerové lords von Wallernstädt, barons Staël von Holstein, barons Ožegović Barlabaševački i Bele, lords von Kraus, barons von Puteani, princes von Auersperg-Breunner and counts von Korff. Another important marriage tie was with industrialist family Regenhart or with noble, soldier and journalist Morice Fialka, the ancestor of famous Hungarian artistic family of Ferenczy.

== Misconceptions and mistakes ==
As was already mentioned, when the family members in 19th century had begun to seek their origins, many mistakes were made and those, repeatedly adopted in the literature and supported by inaccurate knowledge of some family members, are being repeated even today and remain untreated.

According to some, the family comes from German town Friedberg (Friedberg in der Wetterau) from the 12th century, whilst in the 13th century they were ennobled, and sometimes foreign persons are being counted amongst the family’s members, like Ojíř von Friedberg and other famous dignitaries (Erroneous union with different family von Friedberg.).

In the 15th century the family was supposed to be living in Kraków in Poland (Mistaken with the family Salomons of Benediktovice formerly from Kraków and ennobled in 1434.) and it was only after the Thirty Years War that they moved to Bohemia during the distribution of the possessions of defeated Protestant nobles.
