= Archduke Joseph Ferdinand of Austria =

Austro-Hungarian Archduke and military commander

Archduke: Joseph Ferdinand; of Austria
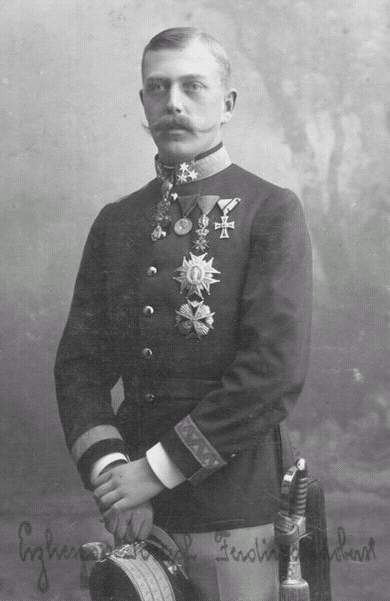
- Joseph Ferdinand in 1895
- Born: 24 May 1872; Salzburg, Duchy of Salzburg, Austria-Hungary
- Died: 28 August 1942 (aged 70); Vienna, Nazi Germany
- Education: Theresian Military Academy, Wiener Neustadt
- Spouse(s): Rosa Kaltenbrunner (m. 1921; div. 1928) Gertrude Tomanek von Beyerfels-Mondsee (m. 1929)
- Children: Claudia von Habsburg-Lothringen; Maximilian von Habsburg-Lothringen
- Relatives: Father; Ferdinand IV, Grand Duke of Tuscany; Mother; Alice of Bourbon-Parma; House; Habsburg-Lorraine
- Military career
- Allegiance: Austria-Hungary
- Branch: Austro-Hungarian Army
- Rank: Colonel general
- Commands: XIV Corps; 4th Army
- Conflicts: First World War: Battle of Galicia; Battle of Gnila Lipa; Battle of Rawa; Summer Offensive; Battle of Dniestr and Zolota Lypa; Brusilov offensive

Archduke Joseph Ferdinand of Austria (full name Joseph Ferdinand Salvator Maria Franz Leopold Anton Albert Johann Baptist Karl Ludwig Rupert Maria Auxilatrix; 24 May 1872 – 28 August 1942) was an Austro-Hungarian Archduke, military commander, from 1916 Generaloberst, and early advocate of air power. He later retired to live as a common citizen of Austria, and was briefly imprisoned in Dachau during the Nazi era.

== Early life ==
Joseph Ferdinand was born in Salzburg to Ferdinand IV, Grand Duke of Tuscany, the last Grand Duke of Tuscany, and his wife, Princess Alice of Bourbon-Parma. As the fourth child and second son, he assumed the mantle of heir after his elder brother gave up the claim following numerous scandals. While his father's retention of the title of Grand Duke of Tuscany after the abolition of the grand duchy in 1860, it was no longer recognised at the Austrian court. Joseph Ferdinand nonetheless succeeded his father as grand duke and subsequently conferred the title of Prince and Princess of Florence on the son and daughter of his second, non-dynastic marriage.

== Education and career ==
Joseph Ferdinand attended the military Oberrealschule at Hranice (in that time also known as Mährisch Weissenkirchen) and later the Theresian Military Academy at Wiener Neustadt. Upon graduating from the academy, he was commissioned as a lieutenant in the Tirol Jäger regiment on 18 August 1892. Following various assignments with Infantrie Regiment (IR) No's. 93, 17, 59 and the Tirol Jäger Regiment No. 4, he was attached to IR No. 27 as an Oberstleutnant in 1903. From 1895 until 1897, he attended the Kriegsschule in Vienna. From 1905 until 1908, the Archduke commanded IR No. 93 as an Oberst, then the Infantry Brigade No. 5.

The Archduke Joseph Ferdinand concerned himself with aviation, which was not taken seriously in military circles at the time. He was fascinated by balloons from an early age; in 1909, he arranged a balloon flight from his manor in Linz to Dieppe in France, which lasted 16 hours. In January 1911, the Archduke received command of the 3rd infantry division in Linz, followed afterwards by his promotion to Feldmarschalleutnant on 1 May 1911.

== World War I ==
Monarchical styles of Archduke Joseph Ferdinand of Austria
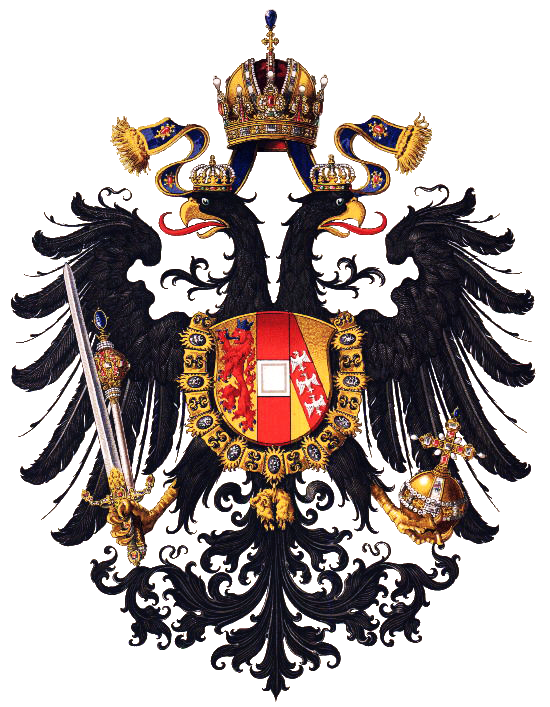
- Reference style: His Imperial and Royal Highness
- Spoken style: Your Imperial and Royal Highness

In August 1914, he took the command of the XIV Corps, succeeding General der Kavallerie Viktor Dankl von Krasnik, who had taken command of the 1st Army. His Corps was part of the 3rd Army of General Rudolf von Brudermann. In early September 1914, the devastating battles at the Zlota and Gnila Lipa practically destroyed the 3rd Army, and the 4th Army under General Moritz von Auffenberg was also decimated following the Battle of Rawa. The Archduke was chosen to replace Auffenberg on October 1. Meanwhile, the XIV Corps was taken over by Feldmarschalleutnant Josef Roth on 30 September.

Joseph Ferdinand was to remain in command of the 4th Army until early June 1916. At this time, General Aleksei Brusilov launched the Brusilov offensive at the juncture of the 4th and 1st Armies. The result was that Joseph Ferdinand's trenches were obliterated by the Russian bombardment and his troops surrendered en masse to the advancing Russians. In light of this massive set-back, the German High Command insisted on his removal from command. The archduke went into retirement and was replaced by General Karl Tersztyánszky von Nádas.

Following the accession of Emperor Charles I in November 1916, Archduke Joseph Ferdinand was offered the post of Inspector General of the Imperial Air Force. The archduke brought his interest in ballooning to the post, although the Army HQ immediately objected to the appointment. In spite of their reservations, the archduke was appointed on 8 July 1917 and he remained there until 3 September 1918.

Theodore von Kármán, then an Oberleutnant in the Austro-Hungarian Luftarsenal, found Joseph Ferdinand to be an "ignorant and pompous fellow." As Inspector General Joseph Ferdinand visited the Austro-Daimler Company where he was shown the company's first six-cylinder airplane engine by Ferdinand Porsche. In his autobiography von Kármán relates an exchange between Joseph Ferdinand and Porsche:

"Is this a four cylinder engine?" the Archduke asked.
"Yes, Imperial Highness."
"Well, then why are there six cylinders?" he demanded.
Porsche with a side wink at me replied: "The last two cylinders are reserves."

== Marriages and issue ==
He was married at Maria Plain on 2 May 1921 to Rosa Kaltenbrunner (Linz, 27 February 1878 – Salzburg, 9 December 1929), who was not a noble; the marriage lasted until their divorce in 1928, without issue.

In Vienna on 27 January 1929, Joseph Ferdinand married again, this time to Gertrude Tomanek, Edle von Beyerfels-Mondsee (Brünn, 13 April 1902 – Salzburg, 15 February 1997). He had two children from this marriage;

- Claudia Maria Theresia von Habsburg-Lothringen, styled by her father Princess of Florence, born in Vienna on 6 April 1930, unmarried and without issue.
- Maximilian Franz Joseph Karl Otto Heinrich von Habsburg-Lothringen, styled by his father, Prince of Florence (17 March 1932, Vienna – 30 April 2024) and married in London on 3 September 1961 to Doris Williams, born in Blundell Sands, Lancashire, on 24 December 1929, by whom he had an only daughter, Maria Camilla von Habsburg-Lothringen, born in Wimbledon on 29 May 1962, unmarried and without issue.

== Imprisonment and release ==
When the Germans occupied Austria in 1938, Joseph Ferdinand was arrested along with more than 70,000 other Viennese. He was interrogated by the Gestapo and sent to Dachau concentration camp, where he was imprisoned for three months. The conditions in the camp ruined his health permanently. Joseph Ferdinand was released by the petition of Albert and Olga Göring and lived an isolated existence thereafter, under continual observation by the Gestapo. After his release, he settled in Vienna as a commoner. He died on 28 August 1942 in Vienna.

== Ancestry ==
Ancestors of Archduke Joseph Ferdinand of Austria

8. Ferdinand III, Grand Duke of Tuscany
4. Leopold II, Grand Duke of Tuscany
9. Princess Luisa of Naples and Sicily
2. Ferdinand IV, Grand Duke of Tuscany
10. Francis I of the Two Sicilies
5. Princess Maria Antonia of the Two Sicilies
11. Infanta Maria Isabella of Spain
1. Archduke Joseph Ferdinand of Austria
12. Charles II, Duke of Parma
6. Charles III, Duke of Parma
13. Princess Maria Teresa of Savoy
3. Princess Alice of Bourbon-Parma
14. Prince Charles Ferdinand, Duke of Berry
7. Princess Louise of Artois
15. Princess Marie Caroline of Naples and Sicily

Archduke Joseph Ferdinand of Austria House of Habsburg-Lorraine Cadet branch of the House of Lorraine Born: 24 May 1872 Died: 28 February 1942
Titles in pretence
Preceded by Ferdinand IV	— TITULAR — Grand Duke of Tuscany; 17 January 1908 – 2 May 1921; Reason for succession failure: Italian Unification under the House of Savoy	Succeeded by Archduke Peter Ferdinand
Military offices
Preceded by Viktor Dankl von Krasnik	Commander of the XIV Corps; August–September 1914	Succeeded by Josef Roth
Preceded by Moritz von Auffenberg	Commander of the Fourth Army; October 1914 – June 1916	Succeeded by Karl Tersztyánszky von Nádás
New title Post created	Inspector General of the Imperial and Royal Aviation Troops; July 1917 – September 1918	Post disestablished
