= Moritz von Auffenberg =

Austro-Hungarian military officer (1852–1928)

Freiherr Moritz Auffenberg von Komarów
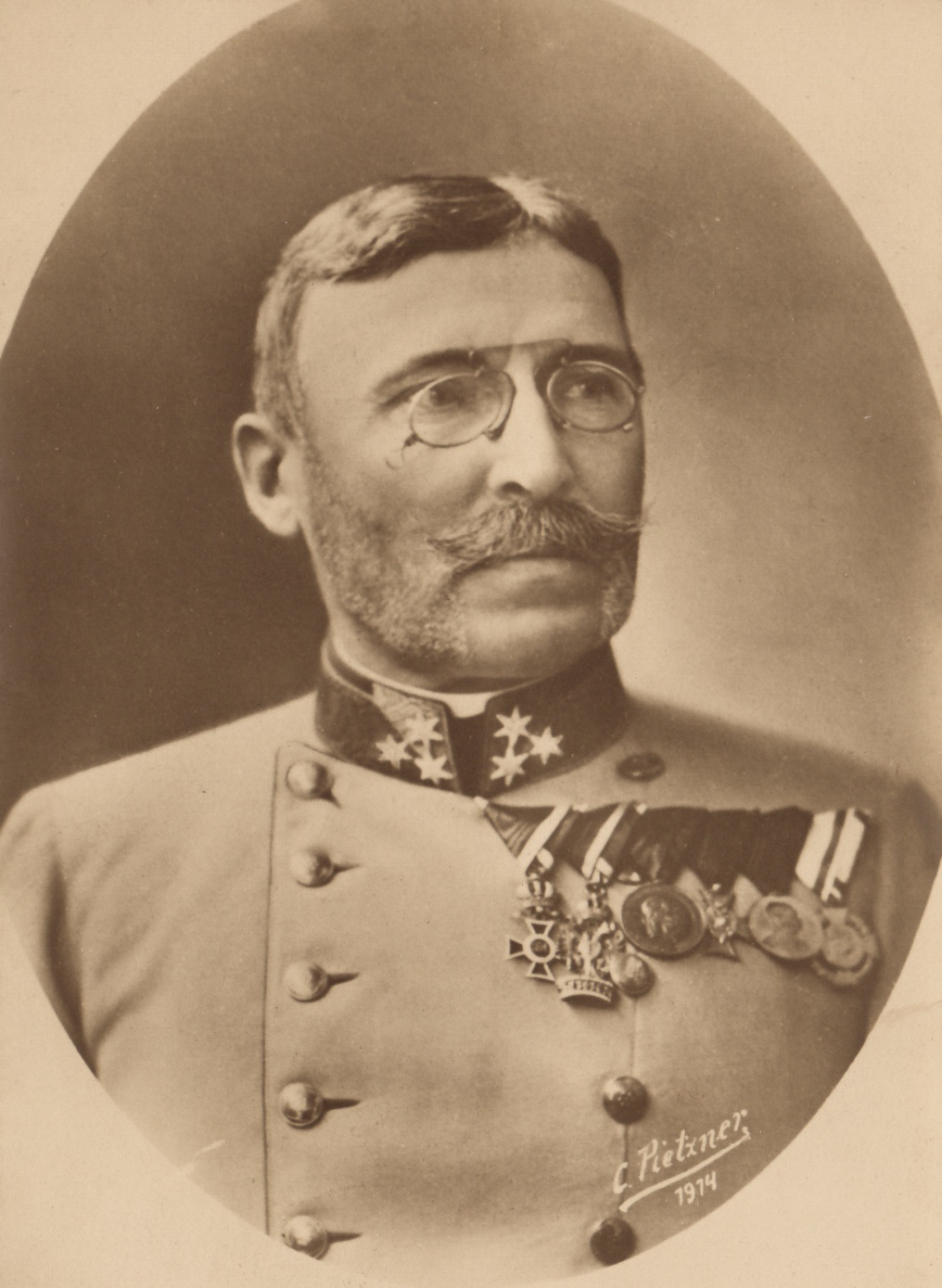
- General Moritz Auffenberg von Komarów, 1915.
- Born: 22 May 1852; Troppau, Austrian Empire
- Died: 18 May 1928 (aged 75); Vienna, First Austrian Republic
- Military career
- Allegiance: Austria-Hungary
- Branch: (Austria-Hungary) Austro-Hungarian Army
- Service years: 1871–1918
- Rank: General der Infanterie
- Commands: Fourth Army

Moritz Friedrich Joseph Eugen Freiherr Auffenberg von Komarów (born Auffenberg; since 1919 Moritz Auffenberg; 22 May 1852 – 18 May 1928) was an Austro-Hungarian Military officer in the Austro-Hungarian Army and Minister of War. At the outbreak of World War I, he took command of the Fourth Army.

== Biography ==
Auffenberg was born a commoner, but in 1869 his father was ennobled into Austrian nobility, with the title Ritter von Auffenberg. He entered the army at age 19. As a young staff officer, he served in the army which occupied Bosnia in 1878. He later commanded the XV. Army Corps at Sarajevo. In 1910, he reached the rank of general. His active spirit led him to take a vigorous part in the internal politics of the monarchy, his knowledge of the Hungarian and more especially of the Southern Slav question being intimate. He had attracted the attention of the heir to the throne, the Archduke Francis Ferdinand, who had, in spite of much opposition, secured his appointment as Minister of War of the Empire in 1911, where he served until 1912, when he was obligated to resign after only a little over a year. In this position, he tried to modernize the army, obtaining many political enemies in the process. Among his few successes was an increase of military budget.

During World War I, Auffenberg commanded the Fourth Army which won at the Battle of Komarów but was defeated by the Russians during the Battle of Rawa (the "six days battle"). He was blamed for the defeat, dismissed from the command and replaced by the Archduke Josef Ferdinand. Auffenberg never held a command again.

On 22 April 1915 Emperor Franz Joseph I awarded him the title of Freiherr (Baron) with the designation "von Komarow," in recognition of his victory at this battle. In April 1915, he was arrested, being suspected that, as War Minister, he delivered to an unauthorized person a copy of military instructions with a view to speculation on the stock exchange, but the court acquitted him.

== Books ==
Auffenberg wrote two books about the war:

- Aus Österreich-Ungarns Teilnahme am Weltkrieg (About Austro-Hungarian participation in the World War), Berlin, Ullstein, 1920.
- Aus Österreich-Ungarns Höhe und Niedergang - Eine Lebensschilderung (About rise and fall of Austria-Hungary - a life description), Munich, 1921.

== Sources ==
- "Moritz Freiherr Auffenberg von Komarów". Austrian Commanders.

Military offices
Preceded by Franz Xaver von Schönaich	Imperial & Royal Minister for War; 1911–1912	Succeeded by Alexander von Krobatin
