= 4th Army (Austria-Hungary) =

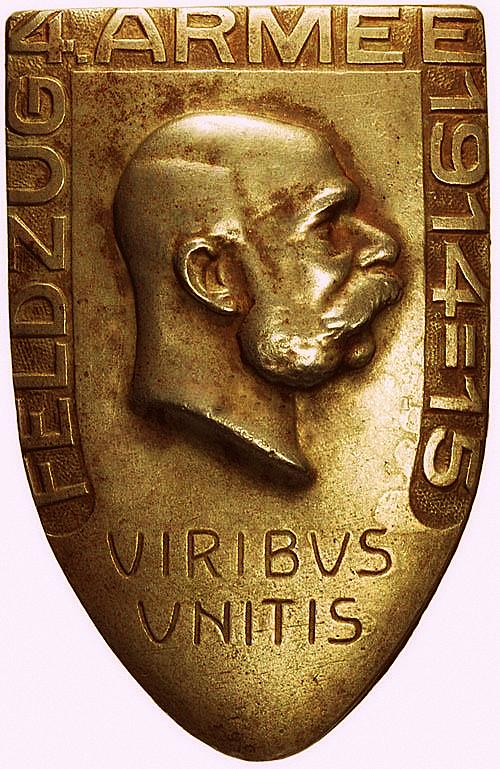
- Active: August 1914 – March 1918
- Country: Austria-Hungary
- Allegiance: (Austria-Hungary) Habsburg monarchy
- Branch: Austro-Hungarian Army
- Type: Field Army
- Motto: Viribus Unitis
- Engagements: World War I: Battle of Komarów; Battle of Rawa; Battle of the Vistula River; Battle of Limanowa; Gorlice–Tarnów Offensive; Great Retreat; Brusilov Offensive; Operation Faustschlag

The Austro-Hungarian Fourth Army was an Austro-Hungarian field army that fought during World War I.

== Actions ==
The Austro-Hungarian Fourth Army was formed in August 1914 and deployed on the Eastern Front. It suffered heavy casualties during the Brusilov Offensive. The 4th Army was disbanded in March 1918. The Fourth Army participated in numerous battles during the war including:

- Battle of Komarów (August 1914)
- Battle of Rawa (September 1914)
- Battle of the Vistula River (October 1914)
- Battle of Limanowa (December 1914)
- Gorlice–Tarnów Offensive (May–June 1915)
- Great Retreat (June–September 1915)
- Brusilov Offensive (June–September 1916)
- Operation Faustschlag (February–March 1918)

== Commanders ==
- Moritz von Auffenberg : August 1914 - 30 September 14
- Archduke Joseph Ferdinand : 30 September 1914 - June 1916
- Karl Tersztyánszky von Nádas : June 1916 - 5 March 1917
- Karl Graf von Kirchbach auf Lauterbach : 5 March 1917 – 15 March 1918
