= Theresian Military Academy =

Military academy of the Austrian Armed Forces in Wiener Neustadt, Lower Austria

Coordinates: 47°48′35″N 16°14′44″E

- Motto: A.E.I.O.U.
- Type: Military academy
- Established: 14 December 1751
- Commandant: Major General Karl Pronhagl
- Location: Wiener Neustadt, Austria
- Website: www.milak.at

The Theresian Military Academy (German: Theresianische Militärakademie, TherMilAk) is a military academy in Austria, where the Austrian Armed Forces train their officers. Founded in 1751, the academy is located in the castle of Wiener Neustadt in Lower Austria.

== History ==
The Theresian Military Academy (known as the Theresianum) is one of the oldest military academies in the world (the oldest is the Military Academy of Modena). It was founded on 14 December 1751 by Maria Theresa of Austria, who gave the first commander of the academy, Field Marshal Leopold Joseph von Daun (Count Daun), the order Mach er mir tüchtige Officier und rechtschaffene Männer daraus ("Make me hard working officers and honest men").

Per year, the academy accepted 100 noblemen and 100 commoners to start their education there. In 1771, Fieldmarshal Lieutenant Hannig published the official studying plan, and in 1775, Maria Theresa published the Academy Rules. At this time, it took 11 years to complete the academy, but step by step, it was shortened to 3 years.

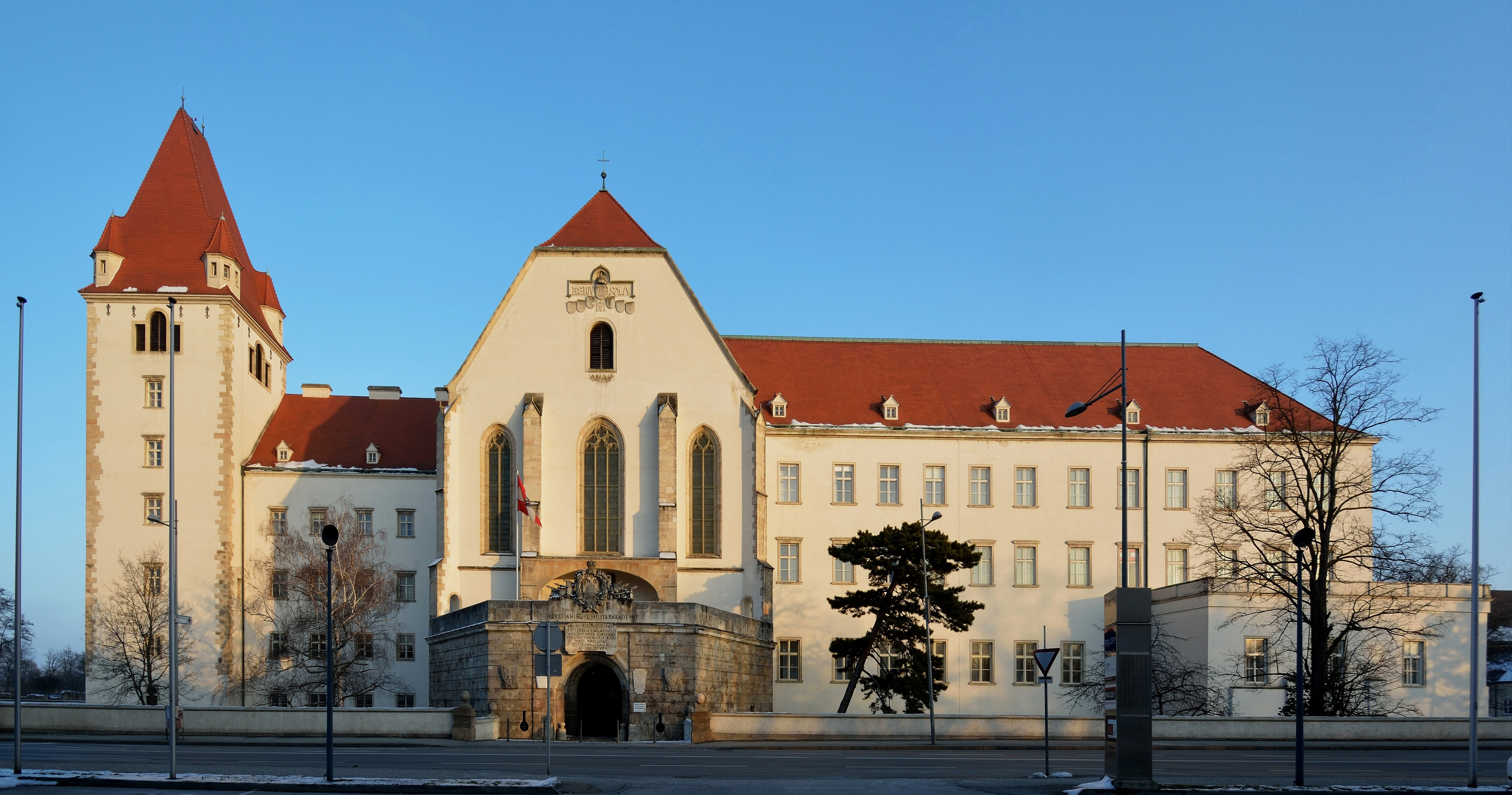
Main building of the academy (also known as Burg Wiener Neustadt)

The Styrian Prince Erzherzog Johann (Archduke John) was the principal headmaster of the academy for 44 years (1805–1849).

During the First Republic (1918–1938), the academy was located in Enns until 1934, and then again in the castle of Wiener Neustadt. A very remarkable event occurred in the time between Austrofascism and the Anschluss (Occupation of Austria by Nazi Germany) when Lieutenant General Rudolf Towarek was commander of the TherMilAk (between 1933 and 1938). He had the guard deployed with the bayonet attached and thus denied the Wehrmacht access to the castle for several days. This was the only military resistance made by Austrians against the occupation by Nazi Germany. GenLt Towarek was not punished for this action; however, he was retired while retaining the right to wear the Austrian uniform after his retirement, which was highly unusual in those days.

After the Anschluss, the Wehrmacht installed a war school for non-commissioned officers at the castle of Wiener Neustadt. The first commander of this school was Erwin Rommel. At this time, the Germans erected a new building next to the castle, which is now known as Fort Daun, in which the Military High School of Austria is located.

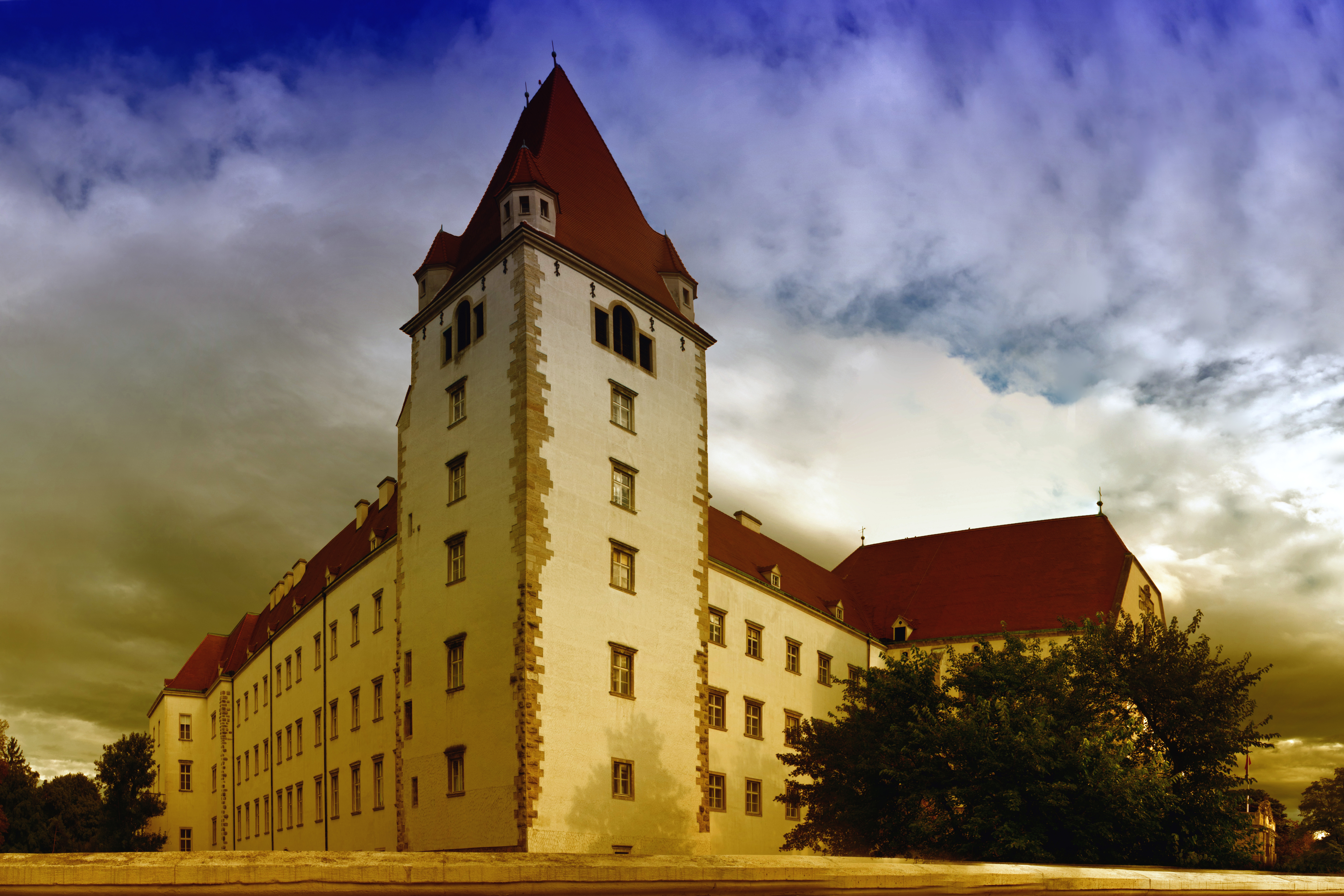
Theresian Military Academy

After World War II and the Austrian State Treaty which was signed in 1955, the demolished castle was rebuilt. In 1958, the military academy was again located in Wiener Neustadt after a short intermezzo (1955–1958) in Enns.

On the occasion of the 500th anniversary of the death of the Holy Roman Emperor Maximilian I, the direct ancestor of Maria Theresa, the so-called "last knight" and founder of a modern war system, a big celebration took place in the church of the military academy in 2019. Karl von Habsburg, the current head of the House of Habsburg, represented the imperial dynasty.

Within the precincts of the Theresian Military Academy is the Theresian Military Academy Cemetery where many students, former teachers and distinguished graduates are buried. Officers interred there include Count Kinsky, Oskar Potiorek and Emil Spannocchi, as well as Thérèse de Dillmont whose father taught at the academy.

== The TherMilAk today ==
The current commanding officer - CO (German: Kommandant - Kdt) of the TherMilAk is Generalmajor Mag. Karl Pronhagl.

From 1997 to 2008, the TherMilAk was a 4-year college which could also be attended by civilian students and finished with a master's degree in military leadership. In 2008, it was changed into a 3-year curriculum, graduating with a bachelor's degree. In 2003, the first four women completed the academy. Since 1959, more than 3,600 young officers have been educated at the Theresian Military Academy. The cadet class graduating in 2004 was given the title of Kaiserjäger (Imperial Rifles), to honor the memory of the brave national light infantrymen who served Austria with distinction during the Imperial period.

== TherMilAk commanders (selection) ==
Below there is a selection of the commanders of the TherMilAk.

name	rank	CO	remark
Guido Novak von Arienti	Feldmarschall-Leutnant	1917–1919	last imperial (kaiserlicher) commander and adge-group godfather of the 2010 graduates
Rudolf Towarek	Generalmajor	1934–1938	
Erwin Rommel	Oberst	1938–1939	22 June 1942: appointed to Generalfeldmarschall

=== Second Republic ===
name	rank	CO	remark
Erwin Starkl	Major	1955–1956	35th CO
Josef Heck	Oberst	1957–1959	Oberst dhmD; 36th CO
Erich Watzek	Generalmajor	1959–1971	37th CO
Alois Nitsch	Generalmajor	1972–1980	38th CO
Johann Philipp	Divisionär	1980–1984	39th CO
Adolf-Erwin Felber	Divisionär	1985–1999	40th CO
Karl-Heinz Fitzal	Divisionär	1999–2003	41st CO
Norbert Sinn	Generalmajor	2003–2013	42nd CO
Gerhard Herke	Brigadier	2013–2016	43rd CO
Karl Pronhagl	Generalmajor	2016–today	44th CO

== See also ==
- List of government-run higher-level national military academies
