= Leaders of the Central Powers of World War I =

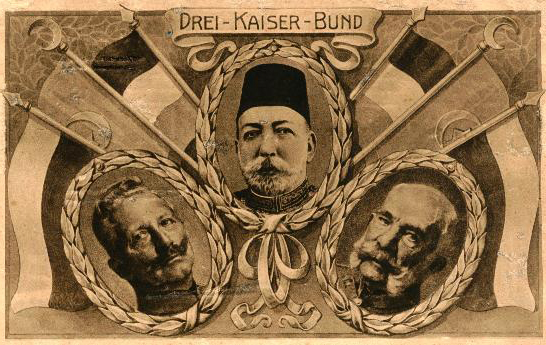
The three emperors: Kaiser Wilhelm II (Germany), Sultan Mehmed V (Ottoman Empire), Emperor Franz Joseph I (Austria-Hungary).

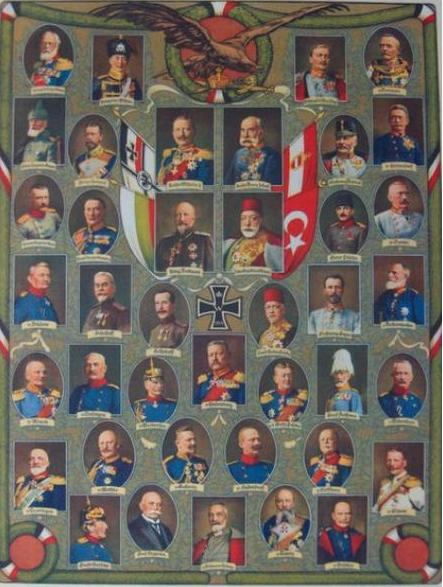
A postcard depicting the leaders of the Central Powers.

The leaders of the Central Powers of World War I were the political or military figures who commanded or supported the Central Powers .

== Austria-Hungary ==
- Franz Joseph I − Emperor of Austria and Apostolic King of Hungary (1848–1916)
- Karl I − Emperor of Austria and Apostolic King of Hungary (1916–1918), Previously commanded Army Group Archduke Karl in 1916, Supreme Commander of the Austro-Hungarian Army (1917–1918)
- Karl von Stürgkh − Minister-President of Austria (1911–1916)
- Ernest von Koerber − Minister-President of Austria (1916)
- Heinrich Clam-Martinic − Minister-President of Austria (1916–1917)
- Ernst Seidler von Feuchtenegg − Minister-President of Austria (1917–1918)
- Max Hussarek von Heinlein − Minister-President of Austria (1918)
- István Tisza − Prime Minister of Hungary (1913–1917)
- Sándor Wekerle − Prime Minister of Hungary (1917–1918)
- Count Leopold Berchtold − Austro-Hungarian Foreign Minister (1912–1915)
- Stephan Burián von Rajecz - Austro-Hungarian Foreign Minister (1915–1916, 1918)
- Ottokar Czernin - Austro-Hungarian Foreign Minister (1916–1918)
- Alexander von Krobatin - Austro-Hungarian Minister of War (1912–1917), Commander of the South Tyrolean Army Group (1918)
- Rudolf Stöger-Steiner von Steinstätten - Austro-Hungarian Minister of War (1917–1918)
- Archduke Friedrich − Supreme Commander of the Austro-Hungarian Army (1914–1917)
- Conrad von Hötzendorf − Chief of the Austro-Hungarian General Staff (1912–1917) and leader of several Army Groups throughout the war.
- Arthur Arz von Straußenburg − Chief of the Austro-Hungarian General Staff (1917–1918)
- Svetozar Boroević − Austro-Hungarian Field Marshal and commander of the 3rd Army (1914–1915) and then the 5th Army (1915–1918) which was later upgraded to Army Group Boroevic in 1917 which contained 2 armies.
- Oskar Potiorek - Governor of Bosnia and Herzegovina and Commander of all Austro-Hungarian forces during the Serbian Campaign in 1914
- Liborius Ritter von Frank - Commanded the 5th Army in the Serbian Campaign (1914)
- Eduard von Böhm-Ermolli − Commanded the 2nd Army in the Serbian Campaign (1914) and the Eastern Front (1915–1918) and Army Group Böhm-Ermolli (1915–1916 & (1916–1918)
- Hermann Kövess von Kövessháza - Commander of the 3rd Army in the Serbian Campaign, particularly in the Kosovo Offensive, later the 7th Army and finally (ceremonially) Commander-in-chief (1918)
- Archduke Eugen of Austria - Commander of Army Group Archduke Eugen, in many battles on the Italian Front.
- Archduke Joseph August of Austria - Involved in the Galician campaign and later served on the Italian Front and went to command the South Tyrolean Army Group in 1918
- Viktor Dankl von Krasnik - Commander of the 1st Army in Galicia and during the Gorlice–Tarnów Offensive. Later made commander of the defense of Tyrol followed by command of the 11th Army
- Franz Rohr von Denta − Commander of the 10th (1916), 11th (1916–1917) and 1st Army (1917) on the Italian and Eastern front.
- Archduke Joseph Ferdinand of Austria − Commanded the 4th army (1914–1916) during the Brusilov Offensive, later became Inspector-General of the Imperial Air Force (1917–1918)
- Karl von Pflanzer-Baltin − Supreme Commander of Austro-Hungarian infantry in Albania (1917–1918), previously commanded the 7th Army (1915–1916)
- Viktor Graf von Scheuchenstuel − Corps Commander in serving in many different fronts, 11th Army (1917–1918)
- Józef Piłsudski − Commander of the Polish Legions
- Anton Haus − Commander-in-Chief of the Austro-Hungarian Navy (1913–1917)
- Maximilian Njegovan − Commander-in-Chief of the Austro-Hungarian Navy (1917–1918)
- Miklós Horthy − Commander-in-Chief of the Austro-Hungarian Navy (1918)
- Milan Emil Uzelac − Commander of the Austro-Hungarian Imperial and Royal Aviation Troops

== German Empire ==
- Wilhelm II − German Emperor and King of Prussia
- Theobald von Bethmann Hollweg − Chancellor of the German Empire (1909–1917)
- Georg Michaelis - Chancellor of the German Empire (1917)
- Georg von Hertling − Chancellor of the German Empire (1917–1918)
- Max von Baden − Chancellor of the German Empire (1918)
- Gottlieb von Jagow − German Foreign Minister (1913–1916)
- Arthur Zimmermann − German Foreign Minister (1916–1917)
- Richard von Kühlmann - German Foreign Minister (1917–1918)
- Paul von Hintze - German Foreign Minister (1918)
- Helmuth von Moltke − Chief of the German General Staff (1906–1914)
- Erich von Falkenhayn − Chief of the German General Staff (1914–1916) and commander in the First Battle of the Marne
- Paul von Hindenburg − Chief of the German General Staff (1916–1918), previously Supreme Commander East (1914–1916) and commanded Army Group Hindenburg
- Erich Ludendorff − Quartermaster General (Chief of Operations) of the German Army, previously Chief of Staff in the East (1914–1916)
- Leopold of Bavaria − Commanded Army Group Prince Leopold of Bavaria before becoming Supreme Commander East (1916–1918)
- Max Hoffmann − Chief of Staff in the East (1916–1918)
- Crown Prince Wilhelm - Commander of the 5th Army (1914–1916) and Army Group German Crown Prince (1915–1918)
- Ruprecht of Bavaria - Commander of the 6th Army (1914–1916) and Army Group Rupprecht of Bavaria (1916–1918)
- Albrecht von Württemberg - Commander of the 4th Army (1914–1916) and Army Group Duke Albrecht (1917–1918)
- August von Mackensen − Commanded the 9th Army (1914) before leading several Army Groups: Army Group Mackensen in Poland and the 11th Army (1915), Serbia (1915–1916) and Romania (1916–1918)
- Max von Gallwitz - Commanded the 12th and later 11th Army in the East, followed by the 2nd Army and Army Group Gallwitz-Somme in the West. Finally Army Group Gallwitz and the 5th Army (1918)
- Remus von Woyrsch - Commanded the Landwehr Corps (1914), followed by Armee-Abteilung Woyrsch (1914–1917) while also holding command of Army Group Woyrsch (1916–1917)
- Hermann von Eichhorn - Commander of the 10th Army (1915–1918) as well as Army Group Eichhorn (1916–1918). In 1918 he commanded Army Group Eichhorn-Kiev and became Military Governor of Ukraine
- Alexander von Linsingen - Commanded the South Army (1915) followed by Army of the Bug (1915–1918) while simultaneously in command of Army Group Linsingen (1916–1918)
- Otto von Below - Commanded the 8th Army (1914–1915) and Army of the Niemen (which was renamed the 8th Army) (1915–1916). Later Army Group Below in Salonika (1916–1917) followed by the 14th Army on the Italian Front
- Friedrich von Scholtz - Commander of the 8th Army (1915) and then led the mostly Bulgarian Army Group Scholtz (1917–1918)
- Max von Boehn - Commanded the 7th Army (1917–1918) and Army Group Boehn (1918)
- Karl von Einem − Commander of the 3rd Army (1914–1919)
- Alexander von Kluck - Commander of the 1st Army (1914–1915) and fought at the Battle of Mons, Le Cateau and Marne
- Karl von Bülow - Commander of the 2nd Army at the Battle of Liège and Siege of Namur and was blamed for the failure of capturing Paris in 1914
- Georg von der Marwitz − Cavalry general who commanded the 2nd Army on the Western Front (1916–1918), followed by commanding the 5th Army at the end of the war in 1918
- Friedrich Sixt von Armin - Commanded the 4th Army (1917–1918) and commander-in-chief in the Flanders region, notably during the Battle of Passchendaele and the German spring offensive
- Ludwig von Falkenhausen - Commander of Armee-Abteilung Falkenhausen (1914–1916) and High Command of Coastal Defence (1916). Commanded the 6th Army (1916–1917) during the Battle of Arras and served as Governor of Belgium until the end of war
- Oskar von Hutier - Commanded the 8th Army in 1917, notably in Operation Albion. He led the newly created 18th Army in the Spring Offensive
- Paul von Lettow-Vorbeck − German Commander in the East Africa Campaign
- Victor Franke − German Commander in the South West Africa campaign
- Carl Heinrich Zimmermann − German Commander in the Kamerun campaign
- Alfred von Tirpitz − Grand Admiral and State Secretary of the German Imperial Naval Office (1897–1916)
- Friedrich von Ingenohl − Commander of the Imperial High Seas Fleet (1913–1915)
- Hugo von Pohl − Commander of the Imperial High Seas Fleet (1915–1916), previously Chief of the Admiralty Staff (1913–1915)
- Reinhard Scheer − Commander of the Imperial High Seas Fleet (1916–1918), notably at the Battle of Jutland. Later Chief of the Admiralty Staff (1918)
- Franz von Hipper − Commander of I Scouting Group and conducted several raids along the English coast, he became commander of the Imperial High Seas Fleet in 1918
- Henning von Holtzendorff − Chief of the Admiralty Staff (1915–1918) and a strong advocate of unrestricted submarine warfare
- Prince Henry of Prussia − Commander of the German Baltic Fleet (1914–1917)
- Alfred Meyer-Waldeck − Naval Commander in the Siege of Tsingtao
- Ernst von Hoeppner − Commanding General of the Imperial German Air Service

== Ottoman Empire ==
- Mehmed V − Sultan of the Ottoman Empire (1909–1918)
- Mehmed VI - Sultan of the Ottoman Empire (1918–1922)
- Said Halim Pasha − Ottoman Grand Vizier (Prime Minister) (1913–1917)
- Talaat Pasha − Ottoman Grand Vizier (1917–1918), Minister of Finance, Minister of Interior
- Enver Pasha − Commander-in-Chief of the Ottoman Army, Minister of War
- Fritz Bronsart von Schellendorf − Chief of the Ottoman General Staff and part of the German military mission to the Ottoman Empire
- Djemal Pasha − Commander of the Fourth Army in Syria (1914–1917), Minister of the Navy
- Ahmed Izzet Pasha − Commander of the Second Army (1916–1917), the Caucasus Army Group (1917) and finally Grand Vizier and Minister of War (1918)
- Otto Liman von Sanders - German Commander of the Fifth Army (1915–1918), notably during the Gallipoli Campaign. Later commander of the Yildirim Army Group in the Sinai and Palestine Campaign (1918)
- Mustafa Kemal Pasha − Notable for his contribution to the Gallipoli Campaign, later commanded the XVI Corps (1915–1916) followed by command of the Second Army (1917) and Seventh Army (1917 & 1918)
- Fevzi Pasha − Commander of several Army Corps and the Second Army. Finally commanded the Seventh Army in Palestine (1917–1918)
- Friedrich Kress von Kressenstein - German commander notably for his actions in the First, Second and Third Battle of Gaza. Later participated in the Caucasus Campaign (1918)
- Mehmet Esat Pasha − Commander of the III Corps who organized the defenses at Gallipoli. Later became commander of the First Army (1915–1918)
- Vehib Pasha − Commander of the Second Army (1914–1916), Third Army (1916–1918) and finally the Eastern Army Group (1918) in the Caucasus Campaign
- Erich von Falkenhayn - Previously the German Chief of Staff, first commander of the Yildirim Army Group (1917–1918)
- Colmar Freiherr von der Goltz - German Commander of the Sixth Army in the Mesopotamian campaign (1915–1916)
- Hafiz Hakki Pasha − Commander of the Third Army, notably at the Battle of Sarikamish (1915)
- Abdul Kerim Pasha − Commander of the Third Army, notably in the Battle of Kara Killisse and the Erzurum Offensive (1915–1916). Later commander of the XX Corps on the Salonika front
- Halil Pasha - Commander of the Sixth Army in the Mesopotamian and Persian Campaign (1916–1918). Later commanded the Eastern Army Group (1918)
- Nuri Pasha - Commander of the Africa Groups Command and later the Ottoman-Azerbaijani Islamic Army of the Caucasus, notably in the Battle of Baku (1918)
- Yakup Şevki Pasha − Commander of the XV Corps on the Eastern Front in Galicia (1916)
- Mustafa Hilmi Pasha − Commander of the VI Corps in the Romanian Campaign (1916–1918)
- Ja'far Pasha - Commander during the Senussi Campaign
- Cevat Pasha − Commander of the Dardanelles Fortified Area Command (1914–1915). Later commander of the XV Corps in Galicia (1916–1917)
- Nureddin Pasha − Commander of the Iraq Area Command
- Osman Fuad − Commander of the Africa Groups Command
- Fakhri Pasha − Commander of the Hejaz Expeditionary Force (1916–1919)
- Wilhelm Souchon − German Naval Commander in the Ottoman Empire in the Black Sea, notable for launching the Black Sea Raid in 1914

== Tsardom of Bulgaria ==
- Ferdinand I − Tsar of Bulgaria
- Vasil Radoslavov − Prime Minister of Bulgaria (1913–1918)
- Aleksandar Malinov − Prime Minister of Bulgaria (1918)
- Kalin Naidenov − Minister of War (1915–1918)
- Sava Savov − Minister of War (1918)
- Nikola Zhekov − Commander-in-Chief of the Bulgarian Army (1915–1918)
- Georgi Todorov − Commander of the Second Army (1915–1917), Third Army in the Romanian Campaign and Deputy Commander-in-Chief after the illness of Nikola Zhekov, 1918
- Konstantin Zhostov − Chief of the Bulgarian General Staff (1915–1916)
- Ivan Lukov − Chief of the Bulgarian General Staff (1916–1917) and Commander of the Second Army (1917–1918)
- Hristo Burmov − Chief of the Bulgarian General Staff (1918)
- Kliment Boyadzhiev − Commander of the First Army during the Serbian Campaign (1915–1916)
- Dimitar Geshov − Commander of the First Army in several battles on the Salonika front (1916–1918)
- Stefan Toshev − Commander of the Third Army during the Romanian Campaign (1916) and later became Governor of Macedonia
- Stefan Nerezov − Commander of the Third Army (1916–1917), Morava Army Region in occupied Serbia (1917) and First Army (1918)
- Vladimir Vazov − Bulgarian Lieutenant General notable for his defenses against the British in the Second and Third Battles of Doiran
- Panteley Kiselov − Bulgarian General notable for his role in the decisive Battle of Turtucaia in the Romanian Campaign
- Ivan Kolev − Bulgarian Lieutenant General notable for his very effective cavalry tactics used in the Romanian Campaign

== Co-belligerents and lesser allies ==
=== Sultanate of Darfur ===
- Ali Dinar − Sultan of Darfur
- Ramadan Ali − Commander-in-Chief of the Fur Army

=== South African Republic ===
- Manie Maritz − Boer General and leader of the Maritz Rebellion

=== Dervish State ===
- Diiriye Guure − sultan of the Dervish State
- Mohammed Abdullah Hassan − emir of the Dervish State
- Ismail Mire - commander of the Dervish state

=== Senussi ===
- Ahmed Sharif as-Senussi − Leader of the Senussi from 1902 to 1933

=== Emirate of Jabal Shammar ===
- Saud bin Abdulaziz − Emir of Jabal Shammar

== Client states ==
=== Azerbaijan ===
- Fatali Khan Khoyski − Prime Minister of Azerbaijan (1918–1919)
- Khosrov bey Sultanov − Minister of Defense
- Ali-Agha Shikhlinski − Azerbaijani General during the Battle of Baku

=== Iran ===
- Mohammad Taqi Pessian − Iranian commander during the Persian campaign

=== Ukraine ===
- Pavlo Skoropadskyi − Hetman of Ukraine (1918)

== See also ==
- Allied leaders of World War I
