= Wilhelm Heye =

3rd Chief of Staff of the German Reichswehr

Colonel General Wilhelm Heye
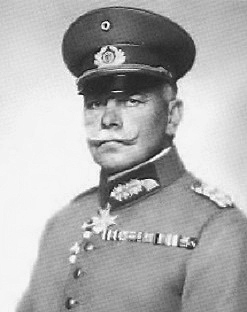
- Wilhelm Heye in a photograph by Nicola Perscheid

3rd Chief of the German Army Command
- In office October 9, 1926 – October 31, 1930
- President: Paul von Hindenburg
- Preceded by: Hans von Seeckt
- Succeeded by: Kurt von Hammerstein-Equord

2nd Chief of the German Troop Office
- In office March 26, 1920 – October 9, 1926
- Preceded by: Hans von Seeckt
- Succeeded by: Otto Hasse

Personal details
- Born: 31 January 1869 Fulda
- Died: 11 March 1947 (aged 78) Braunlage
- Resting place: Braunlage
- Relations: Hellmuth Heye (son)
- Awards: Pour le Mérite with Oak Leaves

Military service
- Allegiance: German Empire; Weimar Republic
- Branch/service: Prussian Army; Reichsheer
- Years of service: 1888–1930
- Rank: Generaloberst
- Battles/wars: World War I

Wilhelm Heye (31 January 1869 – 11 March 1947) was a Prussian and German officer who rose to the rank of Generaloberst and became Chief of the Army Command within the Ministry of the Reichswehr in the Weimar Republic.

== Family ==
Maximilian Henry Friedrich Wilhelm Heye was born on 31 January 1869 in Fulda as the son of Wilhelm Heye (1824-1899), a Prussian Oberstleutnant, and Charlotte, née von Finckh (1834-1871). His paternal grandfather Ernst Heye was a lawyer in Oldenburg and his maternal grandfather Alexander von Finckh was a senior official of the Grand Duchy of Oldenburg. His brother Alexander (1860-1915) was a Prussian Generalmajor zur Disposition and author. His brother-in-law Eugen von Finckh (1860-1930) served as Minister-President of the Free State of Oldenburg from 1923 to 1930.

Wilhelm was married on 29 September 1894 to Elisabeth ("Else") Anna Karcher (1875-1961). The couple had two daughters and three sons. The eldest son was the later Vizeadmiral Hellmuth Heye. Their middle son, Friedrich Wilhelm (1898-1918), died of wounds as a lieutenant and their youngest son, Hans-Joachim (1901-1935), was an officer in the Reichsmarine. Both daughters married army officers.

== Military career in the Prussian army ==
Heye graduated from the Prussian cadet corps (Kadettenkorps) and entered the Prussian Army on 22 March 1888 as a Seconde-Lieutenant in Infanterie-Regiment Nr. 70. He served as a battalion adjutant from 1892 to 1896 and was promoted to Premier-Lieutenant on 22 March 1895.

Heye attended the War Academy (Kriegsakademie) from 1896 to 1899. As part of his preparation for general staff service, he spent several months aboard a naval vessel learning naval gunnery and several months in Russia studying the Russian language. Heye was commanded to the Prussian Army Great General Staff for one year on 1 April 1900 and, with his promotion to supernumary Hauptmann on 23 March 1901, he was officially transferred to the general staff. He returned to troop service on 27 January 1904 as a company commander in Infanterie-Regiment Nr. 58 but was transferred back to the general staff on 1 January 1906 with an assignment to the general staff of the 5th Division in Frankfurt an der Oder.

Heye served from 27 January 1906 to 31 March 1908 in the Schutztruppe in German South West Africa, participating in the Herero Wars as a staff officer. While there, he was promoted to Major on 11 September 1907. Upon returning to the Prussian Army from the Schutztruppe, Heye was assigned to the general staff of the 33rd Division in Metz. From 25 April 1910 to 18 April 1913, Heye was in charge of the counterintelligence section (Abteilung III b) of the general staff. Heye was named a battalion commander in Infanterie-Regiment Nr. 74 on 18 April 1913 and was promoted to Oberstleutnant on 18 December 1913.

At the start of World War I on 2 August 1914, Heye was named chief of the general staff of the Landwehr Corps under Remus von Woyrsch, which later evolved into the Army Detachment Woyrsch, serving with distinction on the Eastern Front. He was promoted to Oberst on 18 August 1916 and named chief of the general staff of Army Group Woyrsch (Heeresgruppe Woyrsch) on 23 September 1916.

On 9 September 1917, Heye was transferred to the Western Front and was named chief of the general staff of the Army Group Duke Albrecht (Heeresgruppe Herzog Albrecht) under the command of Albrecht, Duke of Württemberg. On 7 September 1918, Heye was transferred to the general staff of the field army (Generalstab des Feldheeres) and named chief of the operations section (Operationsabteilung) in the Supreme Army Command (Oberste Heeresleitung), serving under Paul von Hindenburg and Erich Ludendorff, as well as Ludendorff's successor Wilhelm Groener.

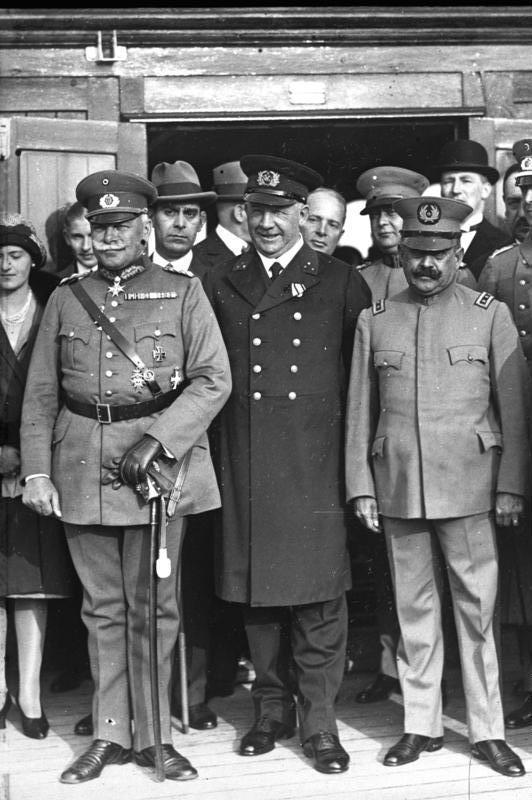
Wilhelm Heye (left), 1929

== Military career in the Reichswehr ==
After the Armistice ending World War I, Heye participated in the defense of Germany's post-war eastern frontier (Grenzschutz Ost) as (from 26 April 1919) chief of the general staff of the Army High Command "Border Protection North (Armeeoberkommando Grenzschutz Nord) in East Prussia. He was the successor to Hans von Seeckt, with whom Heye's military career in the subsequent years would remain closely connected.

On 1 October 1919, Heye became chief of staff of the Troop Office (Truppenamt) in the Ministry of the Reichswehr in Berlin. The Truppenamt served as the covert general staff of the Reichswehr; Seeckt, as chief of the Truppenamt, was effectively chief of the general staff of the Reichswehr, and Heye was his principal deputy.

In the aftermath of the failed Kapp Putsch in March 1920, Seeckt was named Chief of the Army Command (Chef der Heeresleitung), and Heye succeeded him as Chief of the Truppenamt (redesignated as the "Allgemeines Truppenamt"). Heye was promoted to Generalmajor on 16 June 1920 and, with effect from 1 April 1922, simultaneously promoted to Generalleutnant and named chief of the Army Personnel Office (Heerespersonalamt). On 1 November 1923, he was named commander of the Reichswehr's 1st Division in Königsberg in East Prussia, in which capacity he also commanded Military District I (Wehrkreis I).

On 9 October 1926, Heye once again succeeded Seeckt, being named Chef der Heeresleitung. During his tenure, the Heeresleitung lost much of the political influence it had under Seeckt, while the authority of the Ministry of the Reichswehr increased, principally under Wilhelm Groener and his protegé Kurt von Schleicher. Heye was promoted to General der Infanterie on 1 November 1926 and to Generaloberst on 1 January 1930. He retired on 31 October 1930 and was succeeded by Kurt von Hammerstein-Equord.

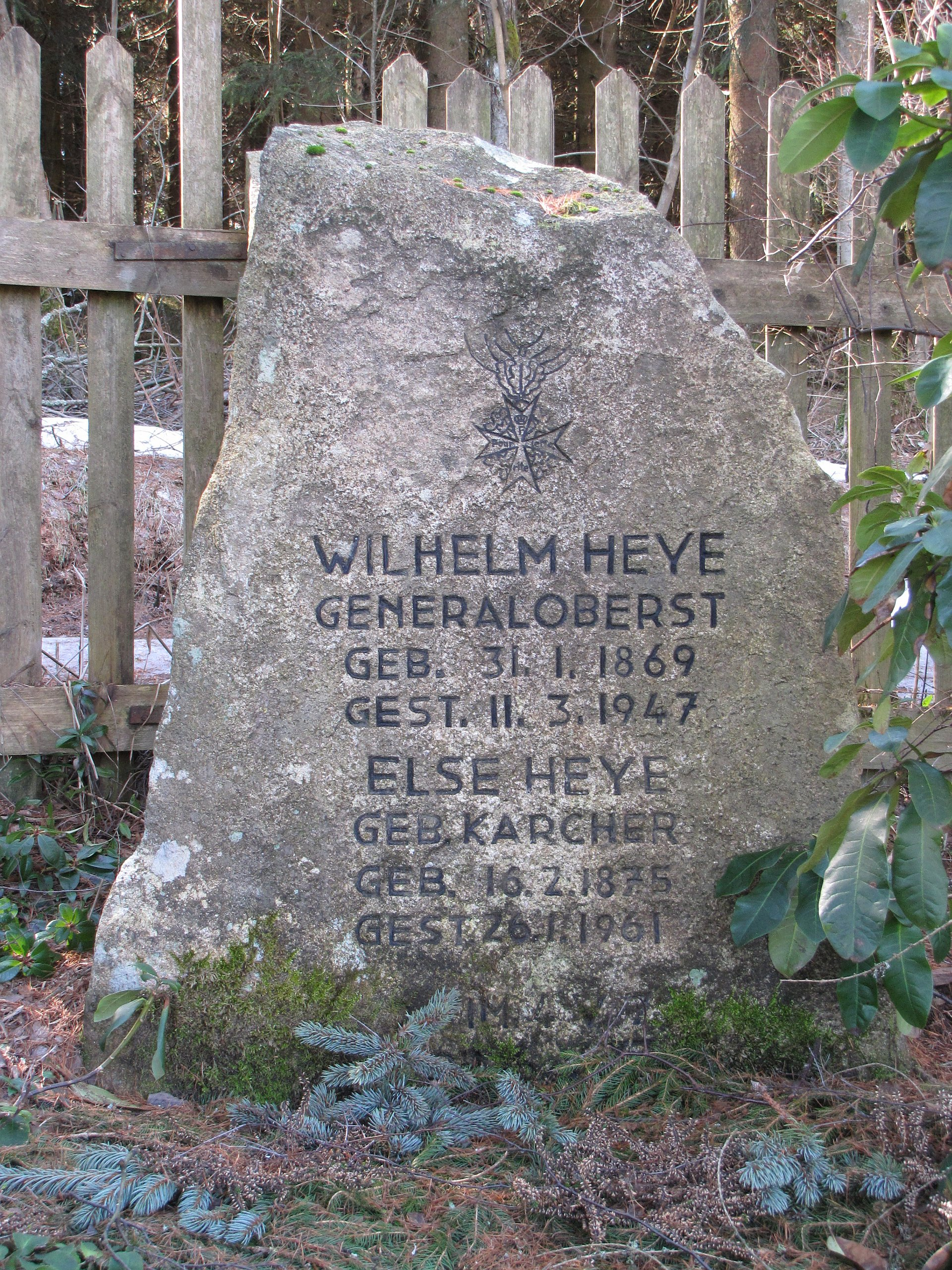
Gravesite in Braunlage

== Later years ==
Generaloberst Heye was placed "zur Verfügung des Heeres" (at the disposal of the army) on 1 November 1938 but was not called up during World War II. He died on 11 March 1947 in Braunlage in the Harz mountains and was buried there.

== Decorations and awards ==
- Kingdom of Prussia: Iron Cross of 1914, 1st and 2nd class
  - 2nd Class (22 September 1914)
  - 1st Class (18 October 1914)
- Kingdom of Prussia: Royal House Order of Hohenzollern, Knight's Cross with Swords (23 July 1915)
- Kingdom of Prussia: Pour le Mérite (20 August 1916) with Oak Leaves (3 April 1918)
- Kingdom of Prussia: Order of the Red Eagle, 4th Class with Swords
  - 4th Class with (20 January 1907)
  - Swords to the 4th Class (21 May 1907)
- Kingdom of Prussia: Order of the Crown, 3rd Class (10 September 1910)
- Kingdom of Prussia: Officer's Service Decoration for 25 Years' Service (13 June 1911) (Note: Although Heye entered service in 1888, he reached 25 years of service in 1911 as Prussian regulations allowed for the double-counting of war years.)
- Kingdom of Prussia: Centenary Medal (1897) (Note: The Kaiser Wilhelm I Centenary Medal was not typically listed in rank lists, but the award was automatic for active Prussian Army personnel at the time it was instituted.)
- German Empire: South West Africa Commemorative Medal
- Hohenzollern Principalities: Princely House Order of Hohenzollern, Commander of the Cross of Honor with Swords (6 June 1917)
- Kingdom of Bavaria: Military Merit Order, Officer's Cross with Swords (23 October 1917)
- Kingdom of Saxony: Albert Order, Officer's Cross with Swords (12 April 1915)
- Kingdom of Württemberg: Military Merit Order, Commander's Cross
- Kingdom of Württemberg: Friedrich Order, Commander's Cross Second Class with Swords (29 November 1916)
- Grand Duchy of Oldenburg: House and Merit Order of Peter Frederick Louis
  - Knight's Cross with Swords (18 November 1907)
  - Commander's Cross with Swords and Laurel (28 July 1917)
- Grand Duchy of Oldenburg: Friedrich August Cross, 1st and 2nd Class (4 November 1914)
- Duchy of Brunswick: War Merit Cross, 2nd Class (28 November 1917)
- Duchy of Saxe-Meiningen: Cross for Merit in War (13 June 1916)
- Principality of Lippe: War Merit Cross (14 October 1916)
- Hamburg: Hanseatic Cross (5 March 1917)
- Lübeck: Hanseatic Cross (8 October 1916)
- Austria-Hungary: Order of Leopold, Commander's Cross with War Decoration (29 October 1917)
- Austria-Hungary: Order of the Iron Crown, 2nd Class with War Decoration
  - 2nd Class (4 April 1913)
  - War Decoration 2nd Class (5 August 1915)
- Austria-Hungary: Order of Franz Joseph, Commander's Cross (9 July 1911)
- Austria-Hungary: Military Merit Cross, 3rd Class with War Decoration (14 September 1914)
- Austria-Hungary: Military Merit Cross, 2nd Class with War Decoration (4 December 1914)
- Kingdom of Bulgaria: Order of Military Merit, Grand Officer (14 August 1918)
- Kingdom of Italy: Order of Saints Maurice and Lazarus, Officer (1 October 1913)
- Ottoman Empire: Order of Osmanieh, 2nd Class with Sabers (11 June 1918)
- Ottoman Empire: Silver Liakat Medal with Sabers (20 October 1915)
- Ottoman Empire: War Medal ("Iron Crescent" or "Gallipoli Star") (20 October 1915)
- Kingdom of Sweden: Order of the Sword, Commander 2nd Class (2 February 1919)
- Germany: Wehrmacht Long Service Award, 4th to 1st Class

== Bibliography ==
Thilo Vogelsang: Heye, Wilhelm, in: Neue Deutsche Biographie (NDB). Band 9, Duncker & Humblot, Berlin 1972, ISBN 3-428-00190-7, p. 79 (https://daten.digitale-sammlungen.de/0001/bsb00016326/images/index.html?seite=93).
