= Battle of Prunaru =

1916 battle in Romania

- Part of the Battle of Bucharest of the Romanian Campaign, World War I
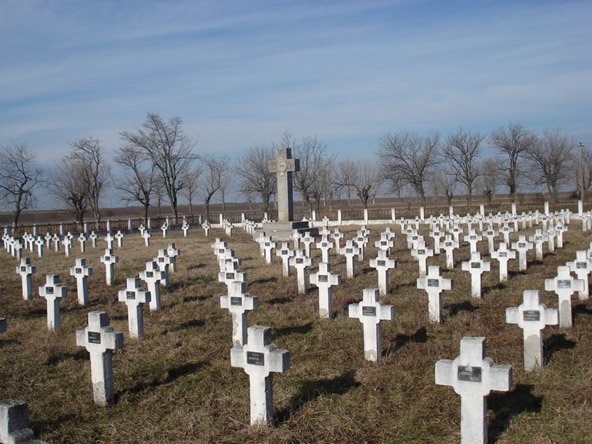
- Memorial commemorating the battle
Date	28 November 1916
Location	Prunaru, Teleorman County, Romania
Result	See aftermath: 217th Division halted; Left flank of the Danube Army subsequently exposed

Belligerents
Romania	German Empire

Commanders and leaders
(Kingdom of Romania) Constantin Prezan	(German Empire) August von Mackensen

Casualties and losses
700 captured 20 guns	Unknown

The Battle of Prunaru was a military engagement between German and Romanian forces during the Romanian Campaign of World War I. It resulted in a tactical German victory, but following the heavy Romanian resistance the Germans halted after taking Prunaru. General Constantin Prezan's maneuver group checked the German forces in the region within two days, exposing the left flank of Field Marshal August von Mackensen's Danube Army.

== Background ==
On 23 November 1916, the 217th Division of the Danube Army was ferried across the Danube onto Romanian soil. On 27 November, General Erich von Falkenhayn's 9th Army linked up with Mackensen's Danube Army. Two days prior, on 25 November, Falkenhayn's 9th Army was subordinated to Mackensen's overall command, in order to unify the command of the Central Powers forces in Romania. The two armies could now converge on the Romanian capital, Bucharest. On 22 November, Prezan assumed command of a new Romanian southern army group, tasked with defending Bucharest.

== Battle ==
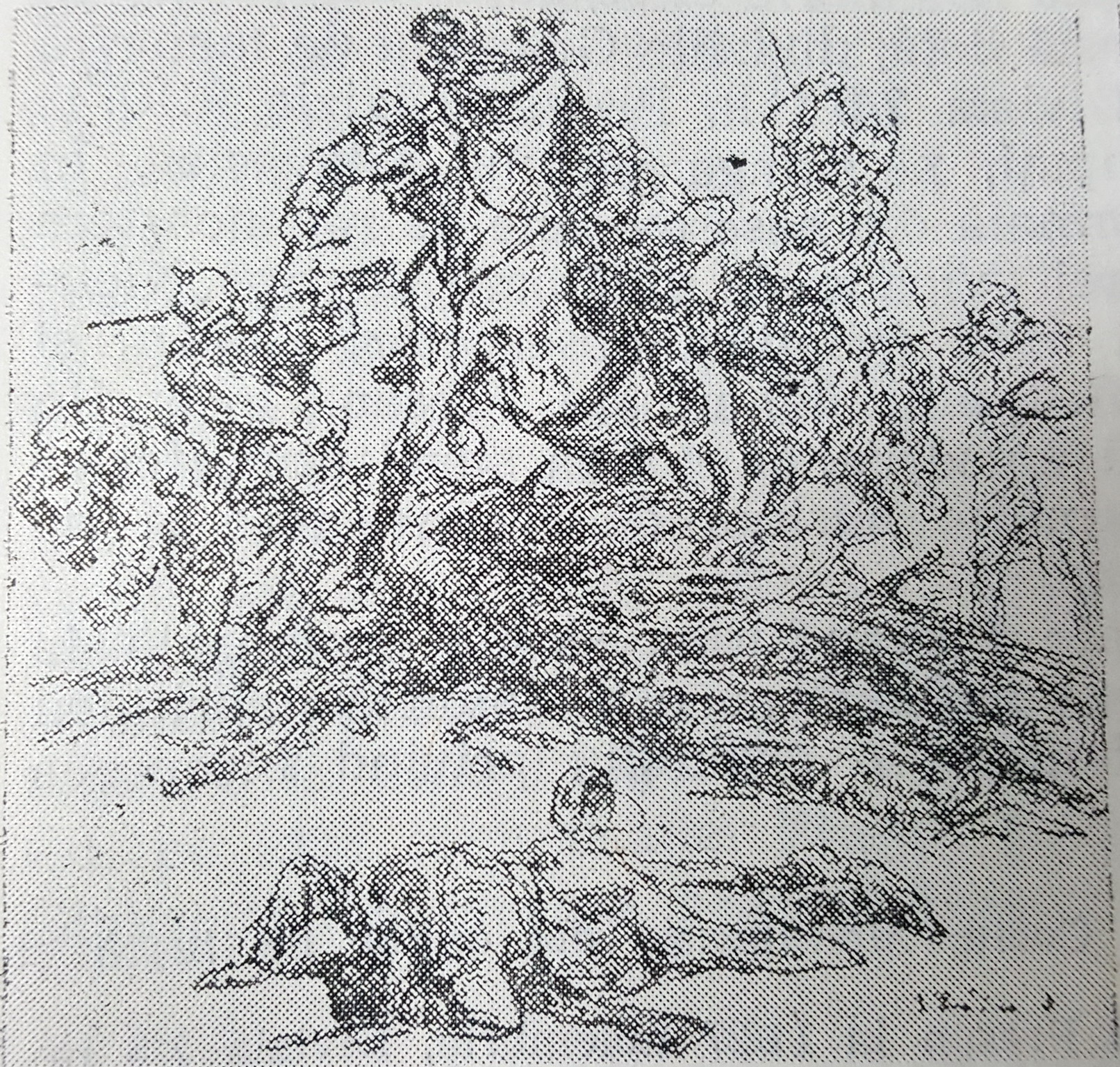
The Prunaru Cavalry Charge

On 28 November, the leading elements of the 217th Division encountered strong Romanian forces near the village of Prunaru. Only with the arrival of heavy artillery around noon were the Romanians driven back.

== Aftermath ==
The German division captured 700 Romanians and 20 guns at Prunaru. However, the Romanian defence had succeeded: following the battle, the 217th Division halted. Although it moved some battalions to Naipu, these were checked by Prezan's maneuver group within two days. The left flank of the Danube Army had thus been exposed.
