= Woyrsch =

Woyrsch is a surname of German origin. Notable people with the surname include:

- Felix Woyrsch (1860–1944), German composer and choir director
- Remus von Woyrsch (1847–1920), Prussian field marshal and member of the Prussian House of Lords, uncle of Udo von Woyrsch
- Udo von Woyrsch (1895–1983), German SS officer and Holocaust perpetrator, nephew of Remus von Woyrsch

== See also ==
- Armee-Abteilung Woyrsch, army led by Remus von Woyrsch
