= XXII Reserve Corps =

Corps level command of the German Army in World War I

XXII Reserve Corps XXII. Reserve-Korps
- Flag of the Staff of a Generalkommando (1871–1918)
- Active: October 1914 - post November 1918
- Country: German Empire
- Type: Corps
- Size: Approximately 32,000 (on formation)
- Engagements: World War I Western Front First Battle of Ypres

Insignia
- Abbreviation: XXII RK

The XXII Reserve Corps (German: XXII. Reserve-Korps / XXII RK) was a corps level command of the German Army in World War I.

== Formation ==
XXII Reserve Corps was formed in October 1914. It was part of the first wave of new Corps formed at the outset of World War I consisting of XXII - XXVII Reserve Corps of 43rd - 54th Reserve Divisions (plus 6th Bavarian Reserve Division). The personnel was predominantly made up of kriegsfreiwillige (wartime volunteers) who did not wait to be called up. It was still in existence at the end of the war.

=== Structure on formation ===
On formation in October 1914, XXII Reserve Corps consisted of two divisions but was weaker than an Active Corps

- Reserve Infantry Regiments consisted of three battalions but only had a machine gun platoon (of 2 machine guns) rather than a machine gun company (of 6 machine guns)
- Reserve Jäger Battalions did not have a machine gun company on formation, though some were provided with a machine gun platoon
- Reserve Cavalry Detachments were much smaller than the Reserve Cavalry Regiments formed on mobilisation
- Reserve Field Artillery Regiments consisted of three abteilungen (2 gun and 1 howitzer) of three batteries each, but each battery had just 4 guns (rather than 6 of the Active and the Reserve Regiments formed on mobilisation)

In summary, XXII Reserve Corps mobilised with 26 infantry battalions, 10 machine gun platoons (20 machine guns), 2 cavalry detachments, 18 field artillery batteries (72 guns) and 2 pioneer companies.

Corps	Division	Brigade	Units
XXII Reserve Corps	43rd Reserve Division	85th Reserve Infantry Brigade	201st Reserve Infantry Regiment
XXII Reserve Corps	43rd Reserve Division	85th Reserve Infantry Brigade	202nd Reserve Infantry Regiment
XXII Reserve Corps	43rd Reserve Division	86th Reserve Infantry Brigade	203rd Reserve Infantry Regiment
XXII Reserve Corps	43rd Reserve Division	86th Reserve Infantry Brigade	204th Reserve Infantry Regiment
XXII Reserve Corps	43rd Reserve Division		15th Reserve Jäger Battalion
XXII Reserve Corps	43rd Reserve Division		43rd Reserve Field Artillery Regiment
XXII Reserve Corps	43rd Reserve Division		43rd Reserve Cavalry Detachment
XXII Reserve Corps	43rd Reserve Division		43rd Reserve Pioneer Company
XXII Reserve Corps	44th Reserve Division	87th Reserve Infantry Brigade	205th Reserve Infantry Regiment
XXII Reserve Corps	44th Reserve Division	87th Reserve Infantry Brigade	206th Reserve Infantry Regiment
XXII Reserve Corps	44th Reserve Division	88th Reserve Infantry Brigade	207th Reserve Infantry Regiment
XXII Reserve Corps	44th Reserve Division	88th Reserve Infantry Brigade	208th Reserve Infantry Regiment
XXII Reserve Corps	44th Reserve Division		16th Reserve Jäger Battalion
XXII Reserve Corps	44th Reserve Division		44th Reserve Field Artillery Regiment
XXII Reserve Corps	44th Reserve Division		44th Reserve Cavalry Detachment
XXII Reserve Corps	44th Reserve Division		44th Reserve Pioneer Company

== Commanders ==
XXII Reserve Corps was commanded throughout its existence by General der Kavallerie Eugen von Falkenhayn , Prussian War Minister Erich von Falkenhayn's older brother.

== Bibliography ==
- Cron, Hermann (2002). Imperial German Army 1914-18: Organisation, Structure, Orders-of-Battle [first published: 1937]. Helion & Co. ISBN 1-874622-70-1.
- Ellis, John; Cox, Michael (1993). The World War I Databook. Aurum Press Ltd. ISBN 1-85410-766-6.
- Busche, Hartwig (1998). Formationsgeschichte der Deutschen Infanterie im Ersten Weltkrieg (1914 bis 1918) (in German). Institut für Preußische Historiographie.
- Histories of Two Hundred and Fifty-One Divisions of the German Army which Participated in the War (1914-1918), compiled from records of Intelligence section of the General Staff, American Expeditionary Forces, at General Headquarters, Chaumont, France 1919. The London Stamp Exchange Ltd. 1989 [1920]. ISBN 0-948130-87-3.
- The German Forces in the Field; 7th Revision, 11th November 1918; Compiled by the General Staff, War Office. Imperial War Museum, London and the Battery Press. 1995 [1918]. ISBN 978-1-870423-95-3.
