= 43rd Reserve Division =

43rd Reserve Division (43. Reserve-Division)
- Active: 1914-1918
- Country: Germany
- Branch: Army
- Type: Infantry
- Size: Approx. 15,000
- Engagements: World War I: Race to the Sea, Gorlice-Tarnów Offensive, Serbian Campaign, Battle of Verdun, Brusilov Offensive, Second Battle of the Aisne

The 43rd Reserve Division (43. Reserve-Division) was a unit of the Imperial German Army in World War I. The division was formed in August 1914 and organized over the next two months. It was part of the first wave of new divisions formed at the outset of World War I, which were numbered the 43rd through 54th Reserve Divisions. The division was disbanded in 1918 and its assets redistributed to other divisions. The division was part of the XXII Reserve Corps and was raised through the depots of the elite Prussian Guard, and thus recruited throughout Prussia.

== Combat chronicle ==
The 43rd Reserve Division initially fought on the Western Front, fighting on the Yser in October–November 1914 and storming Diksmuide in mid-November. It then remained in positional warfare along the Yser until June 1915. In June, it was transferred to the Eastern Front. It fought in the Gorlice-Tarnów Offensive, including the 1915 Battle of Lemberg and the assault on Brest-Litovsk. It then participated in the Serbian Campaign. After the campaign, it remained in reserve until returning to the Western Front in February 1916. It then fought in the Battle of Verdun. In June 1916 the division was again sent to the Eastern Front to face the Russian Brusilov Offensive. Returning from the Eastern Front to France in November, it was in army reserve for a month and then returned to the trenches at Verdun. In April 1917, it fought in the Second Battle of the Aisne, also known as the Third Battle of Champagne (and to the Germans as the Double Battle on the Aisne and in the Champagne). The division remained in the trenches after that, until November 1917, when it was again transferred to the Eastern Front. After the armistice on the Eastern Front, it returned to Germany for training and then to France. The division then fought in a series of battles and engagements until it was dissolved in September 1918. Before 1918, the division was considered a good division, but by 1918 and prior to the division's dissolution Allied intelligence rated the division as third class.

== Order of battle on formation ==
The 43rd Reserve Division was initially organized as a square division, with essentially the same organization as the reserve divisions formed on mobilization. The order of battle of the 43rd Reserve Division on September 10, 1914, was as follows:

- 85. Reserve-Infanterie-Brigade
  - Reserve-Infanterie-Regiment Nr. 201
  - Reserve-Infanterie-Regiment Nr. 202
  - Reserve-Jäger-Bataillon Nr. 15
- 86. Reserve-Infanterie-Brigade
  - Reserve-Infanterie-Regiment Nr. 203
  - Reserve-Infanterie-Regiment Nr. 204
- Reserve-Kavallerie-Abteilung Nr. 43
- Reserve-Feldartillerie-Regiment Nr. 43
- Reserve-Pionier-Kompanie Nr. 43

== Order of battle on April 3, 1918 ==
The 43rd Reserve Division was triangularized in April 1917. Over the course of the war, other changes took place, including the formation of artillery and signals commands and a pioneer battalion. The order of battle on April 3, 1918, was as follows:

- 85. Reserve-Infanterie-Brigade
  - Reserve-Infanterie-Regiment Nr. 201
  - Reserve-Infanterie-Regiment Nr. 202
  - Reserve-Infanterie-Regiment Nr. 203
- 2. Eskadron/Braunschweigisches Husaren-Regiment Nr. 17
- Artillerie-Kommandeur 43
  - Reserve-Feldartillerie-Regiment Nr. 43
  - I. Bataillon/Fußartillerie-Regiment Nr. 16
- Stab Pionier-Bataillon Nr. 343:
  - 4.Kompanie/1. Westpreußisches Pionier-Bataillon Nr. 17
  - Reserve-Pionier-Kompanie Nr. 43
  - Minenwerfer-Kompanie Nr. 243
- Divisions-Nachrichten-Kommandeur 443
