= Adolf Wild von Hohenborn =

German general (1860–1925)

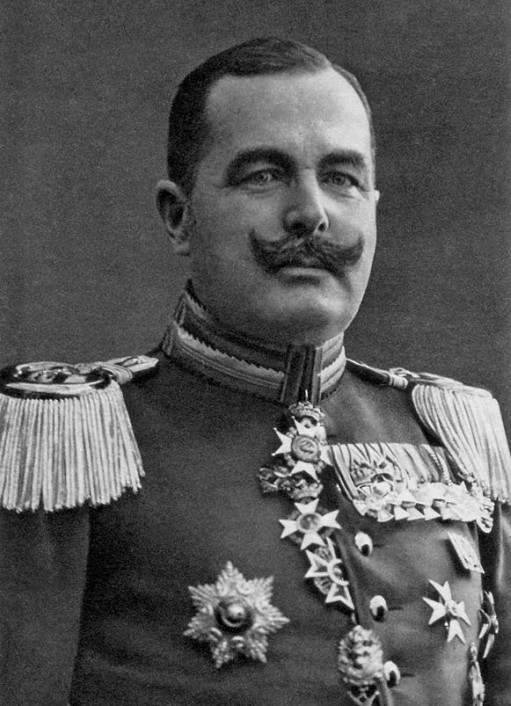

Prussian Minister of War
- In office 21 January 1915 – 29 October 1916
- Monarch: Wilhelm II
- Prime Minister: Theobald von Bethmann Hollweg
- Preceded by: Erich von Falkenhayn
- Succeeded by: Hermann von Stein

Personal details
- Born: Heinrich Adolf Wild von Hohenborn; 8 July 1860 Kassel, Electorate of Hesse
- Died: 25 October 1925 (aged 65)
- Awards: Pour le Mérite with oak leaves

Military service
- Allegiance: German Empire
- Branch/service: Imperial German Army
- Years of service: 1878–1919
- Rank: Generalleutnant char. General der Infanterie
- Commands: 30th Division; XVI Corps
- Battles/wars: World War I

Heinrich Adolf Wild von Hohenborn (8 July 1860 – 25 October 1925) was an Imperial German Army officer who served as a general and Prussian Minister of War during World War I.

== Life ==
During his term as minister of war, from 21 January 1915 to 29 October 1916, he was critical of Paul von Hindenburg and particularly his 'Arbeitspflichtprogramm' (forced labour program). Wild von Hohenborn promulgated the Judenzählung on 11 October 1916 but did not remain in office long enough to implement it as on 29 October he was dismissed from the High Command by Wilhelm II at Hindenburg's request. He continued to serve in the field as commander of the XVI Corps and retired on 3 November 1919 with the character of a General der Infanterie.

== Awards ==
- Pour le Mérite: 2 August 1915
  - Oak Leaves: 11 October 1918
- Iron Cross (1914), 1st and 2nd Classes
- Order of the Red Eagle
- House Order of Hohenzollern
- Order of the Griffon
- Order of the Crown

Political offices
Preceded by Erich von Falkenhayn	Prussian Minister of War; 1915–1916	Succeeded by Hermann von Stein
Military offices
Preceded by Werner von Voigts-Rhetz	Quartermaster-General of the German Army; 11 November 1914 – 20 January 1915	Succeeded by Hugo von Freytag-Loringhoven
