= 9th Army (German Empire) =

9. Armee; 9th Army
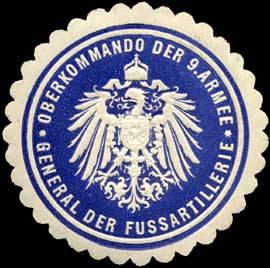
- Seal mark of the High Command of the 9th Army - General of the Foot Artillery
- Active: 19 September 1914 – 30 July 1916; 6 September 1916 – 18 September 1918
- Country: German Empire
- Type: Army
- Engagements: World War I: Eastern Front; Battle of the Vistula River; Battle of Łódź (1914); Battle of Bolimów; Romanian Campaign; Battle of Transylvania; Battle of Mărăşti; Western Front; Second Battle of the Marne

Insignia
- Abbreviation: A.O.K. 9

The 9th Army (German: 9. Armee / Armeeoberkommando 9 / A.O.K. 9) was an army level command of the German Army in World War I. It was formed in September 1914 in Breslau to command troops on the southern sector of the Eastern Front. The army was dissolved on 30 July 1916, but reformed in Transylvania on 6 September 1916 for the Romanian Campaign. It was transferred to the Western Front on 19 June 1918 where it was finally dissolved on 18 September 1918.

== History ==
=== First formation ===
The 9th Army Headquarters was established in Breslau on 19 September 1914 and commanded units drawn from the 8th Army, the Western Front and other units in Upper Silesia. It was originally placed on the southern sector of the Eastern Front on the left flank of the 1st Austro-Hungarian Army.

Organization of the 9th Army on 1 October 1914
Army	Corps	Division
9th Army; Generaloberst Paul von Hindenburg	XI Corps; General der Infanterie Otto von Plüskow from 3rd Army, Western Front	22nd Infantry Division
9th Army; Generaloberst Paul von Hindenburg	XI Corps; General der Infanterie Otto von Plüskow from 3rd Army, Western Front	38th Infantry Division
9th Army; Generaloberst Paul von Hindenburg	XVII Corps; General der Kavallerie August von Mackensen from 8th Army	35th Infantry Division
9th Army; Generaloberst Paul von Hindenburg	XVII Corps; General der Kavallerie August von Mackensen from 8th Army	36th Infantry Division
9th Army; Generaloberst Paul von Hindenburg	XX Corps; General der Infanterie Friedrich von Scholtz from 8th Army	37th Infantry Division
9th Army; Generaloberst Paul von Hindenburg	XX Corps; General der Infanterie Friedrich von Scholtz from 8th Army	41st Infantry Division
9th Army; Generaloberst Paul von Hindenburg	Guards Reserve Corps; General der Artillerie Max von Gallwitz from 2nd Army, Western Front	3rd Guards Infantry Division
9th Army; Generaloberst Paul von Hindenburg	Guards Reserve Corps; General der Artillerie Max von Gallwitz from 2nd Army, Western Front	1st Guards Reserve Division
9th Army; Generaloberst Paul von Hindenburg	Landwehr Corps; General der Infanterie Remus von Woyrsch from 1st Austro-Hungarian Army	3rd Landwehr Division
9th Army; Generaloberst Paul von Hindenburg	Landwehr Corps; General der Infanterie Remus von Woyrsch from 1st Austro-Hungarian Army	4th Landwehr Division
9th Army; Generaloberst Paul von Hindenburg	III Cavalry Corps; General der Kavallerie Rudolf Ritter von Frommel from Western Front	8th Cavalry Division
9th Army; Generaloberst Paul von Hindenburg	Under Army command	35th Reserve Division in Fortress Thorn
9th Army; Generaloberst Paul von Hindenburg	Under Army command	Landwehr Division Bredow in Posen
9th Army; Generaloberst Paul von Hindenburg	Under Army command	4 Landwehr Brigades
9th Army; Generaloberst Paul von Hindenburg	Under Army command	Fortresses at Posen, Breslau and Glogau

=== Second formation ===
9th Army was reformed for the Romanian Campaign in September 1916. Along with the 1st Austro-Hungarian Army (1st A-H Army) it formed the Siebenburg Sector and had the following units:

- XXXIX Reserve Corps
  - Group von Szivo (A-H)
    - Group Danube (A-H)
    - 145th Infantry Brigade (A-H)
  - Group Sunkel (A-H)
    - 187th Division
    - part of 144th Infantry Brigade (A-H)
    - part of Alpenkorps
  - Group Krafft
    - part of Alpenkorps
- Cavalry Corps "Schmettow"
  - 51st Honvéd Infantry Division (A-H)
  - 3rd Cavalry Division
  - 1st Cavalry Division (A-H)
- En route
  - 76th Reserve Division
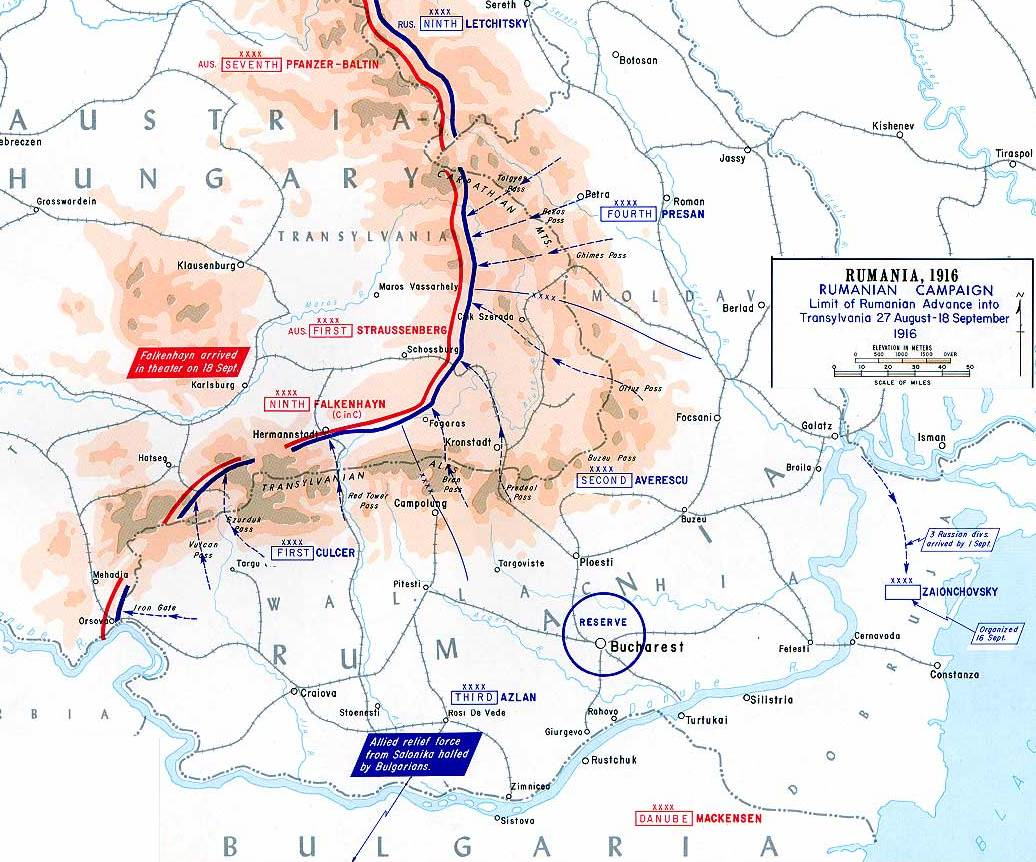
Romanian invasion of Austria-Hungary, August 1916

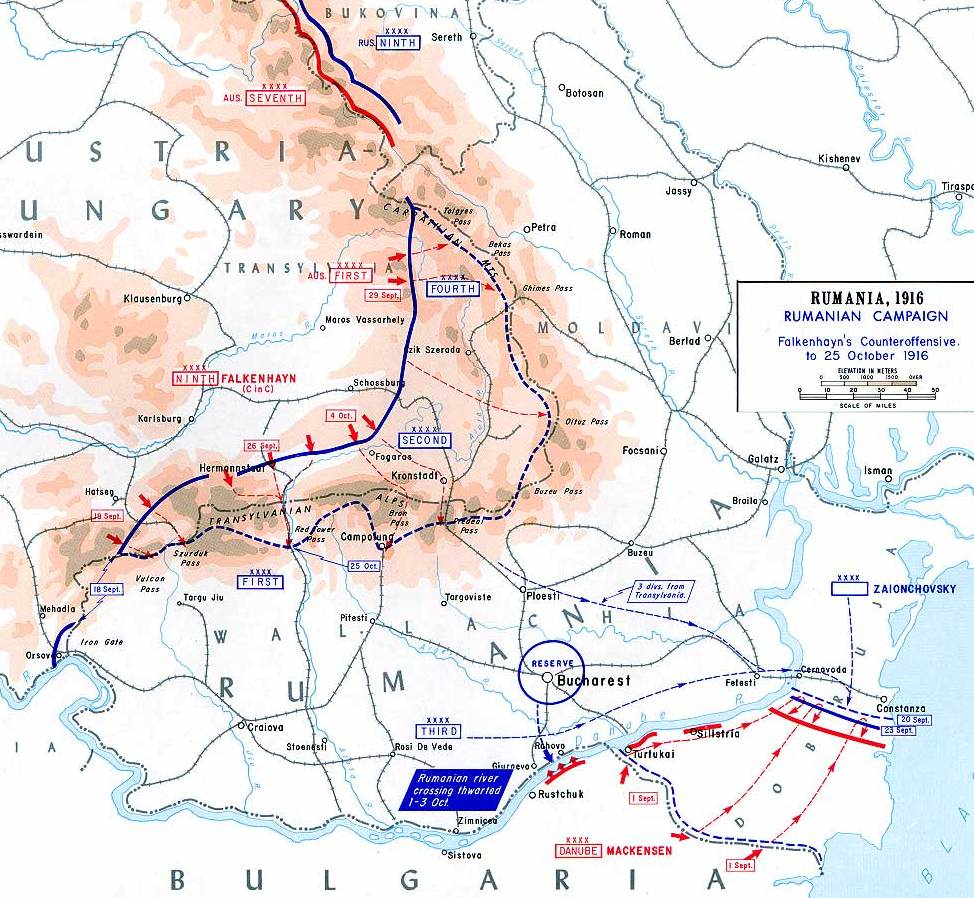
Central Powers counterattack, September–October 1916

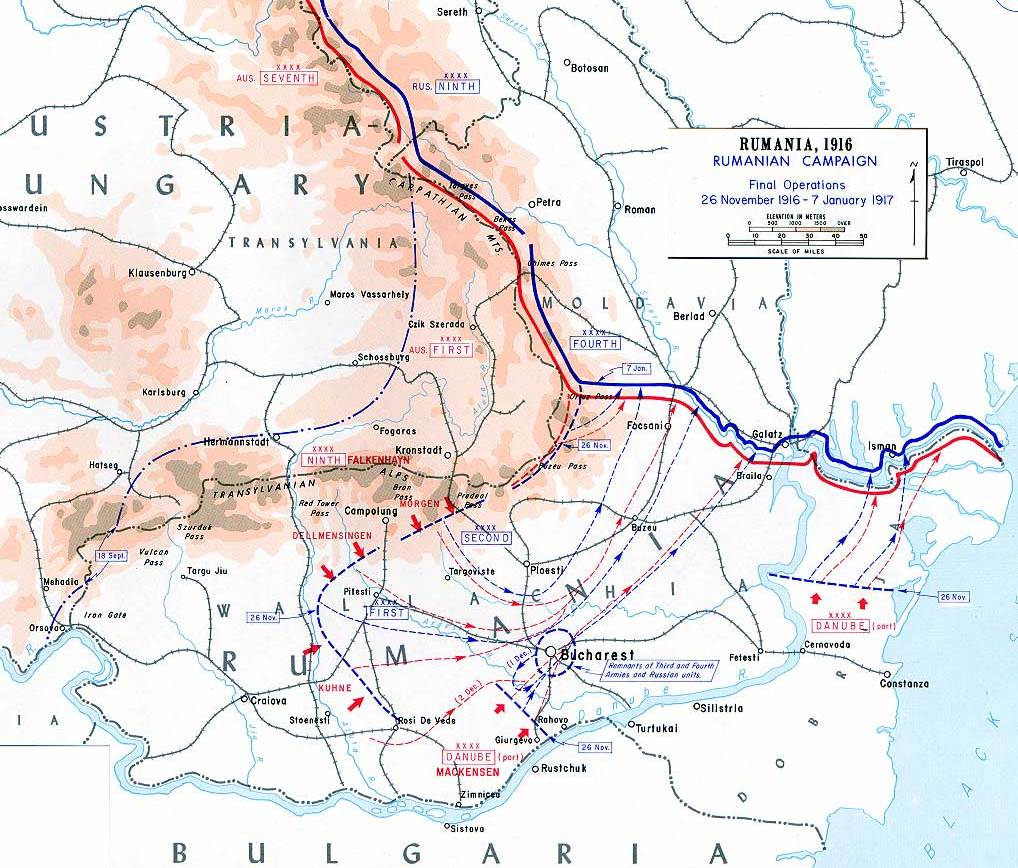
Operations in Romania, November 1916 to January 1917

== Commanders ==
The original 9th Army had the following commanders until it was dissolved 30 July 1916:

9th Army
From	Commander	Previously	Subsequently,
18 September 1914	Generaloberst Paul von Hindenburg	8th Army	OB East
2 November 1914	General der Kavallerie August von Mackensen	XVII Corps	11th Army
17 December 1914	Generaloberst August von Mackensen	XVII Corps	11th Army
17 April 1915	General der Kavallerie Prince Leopold of Bavaria	Brought out of retirement	Heeresgruppe Leopold concurrently from 5 August 1915

A "new" 9th Army was formed in Transylvania for the Romanian Campaign on 6 September 1916. It was dissolved on the Western Front on 18 September 1918.

"New" 9th Army
From	Commander	Previously	Subsequently,
6 September 1916	General der Infanterie Erich von Falkenhayn	Chief of the General Staff	Heeresgruppe F
1 May 1917	General der Infanterie Robert Kosch	52nd Corps (z.b.V.)	52nd Corps (z.b.V.)
10 June 1917	General der Infanterie Johannes von Eben	I Corps	Armee-Abteilung A
9 June 1918	General der Infanterie Fritz von Below	2nd Army	
6 August 1918	General der Infanterie Adolph von Carlowitz	XIX Corps	2nd Army

== Glossary ==
- Armee-Abteilung or Army Detachment in the sense of "something detached from an Army". It is not under the command of an Army so is in itself a small Army.
- Armee-Gruppe or Army Group in the sense of a group within an Army and under its command, generally formed as a temporary measure for a specific task.
- Heeresgruppe or Army Group in the sense of a number of armies under a single commander.

== See also ==
- 9th Army (Wehrmacht) for the equivalent formation in World War II
- Great Retreat (Russian)

== Bibliography ==
- Cron, Hermann (2002). Imperial German Army 1914–18: Organisation, Structure, Orders-of-Battle [first published: 1937]. Helion & Co. ISBN 1-874622-70-1.
- Ellis, John; Cox, Michael (1993). The World War I Databook. Aurum Press Ltd. ISBN 1-85410-766-6.
