= Eugen von Falkenhayn =

German cavalry general

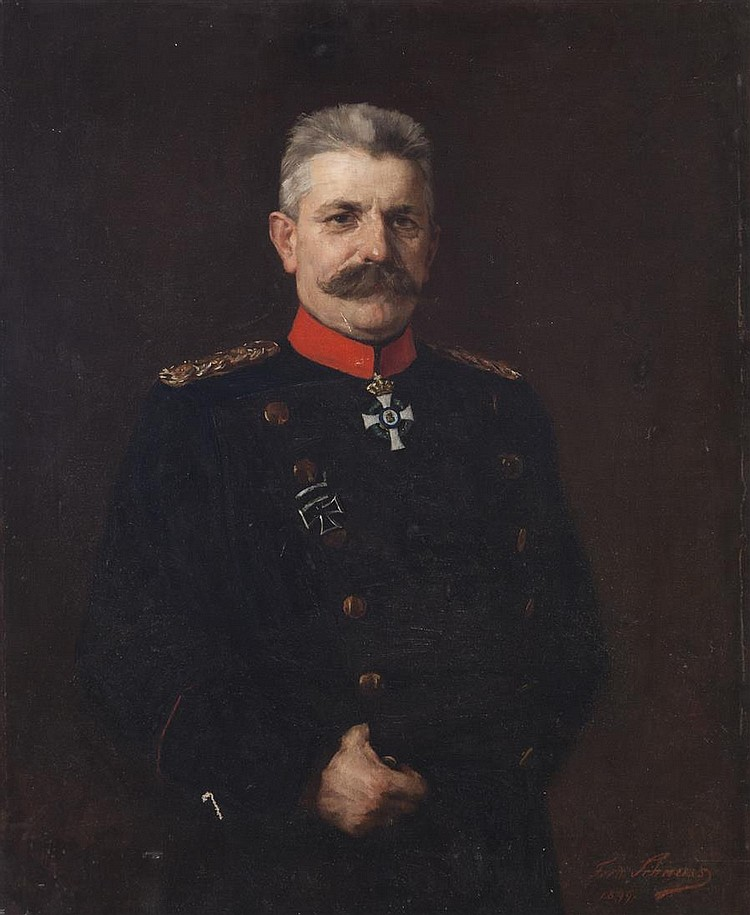
- Portrait by Ferdinand Schauss (1899)
- Born: 4 September 1853; Burg Belchau, West Prussia, Kingdom of Prussia (now Białochowo, Poland)
- Died: 3 January 1934 (aged 80); Berlin, Nazi Germany
- Relatives: Erich von Falkenhayn (brother); Fedor von Bock nephew
- Military career
- Allegiance: German Empire
- Branch: Prussian Army, Cavalry
- Service years: 1870–1910; 1914–1919
- Rank: General of the Cavalry
- Unit: Cuirassier Regiment "Queen" (Pomeranian) No. 2
- Commands: 1. Guard Dragoon Regiment "Queen Victoria of Great Britain and Ireland"; 19. Cavalry-Brigade; 11th Infantry Division; XXII Reserve Corps
- Conflicts: World War I: Battle of Flandres; Battle of Gorlice-Tarnów; Serbia; Battle of Verdun; Brusilov Offensive

Eugen von Falkenhayn (4 September 1853 – 3 January 1934) was a German General of the Cavalry, commanding officer of the XXII Reserve Corps in World War I and Lord Chamberlain of Empress Auguste Viktoria.

== Biography ==
Falkenhayn was born in Burg Belchau, West Prussia (Białochowo, Poland) to Fedor von Falkenhayn (1814–1896) and Franziska von Falkenhayn, née von Rosenberg (1826–1888). His brother Arthur (1857–1929) became tutor of Crown Prince Wilhelm while Erich (1861–1922), became Prussian minister of war and chief of the German General Staff. His only sister Olga von Falkenhayn was the mother of Fieldmarshal Fedor von Bock.

Falkenhayn joined the Prussian Army on 2 August 1870 at the Cuirassier Regiment "Queen" (Pomeranian) No. 2 in Pasewalk, he became a member of the Prussian General Staff in 1883 and Military attaché in Paris in 1887. In 1889 he was attached to the military headquarter of Wilhelm II and became the educator of Prince Wilhelm and Prince Eitel Friedrich of Prussia. He returned to the General Staff in 1894. In 1895 Falkenhayn became the commander of the 1. Guard Dragoon Regiment "Queen Victoria of Great Britain and Ireland" and in 1898 Chief of Staff of the IX Army Corps. In December 1901 Falkenhayn took over the command of the 19. Cavalry-Brigade in Hanover and the 11th Infantry Division in Breslau (Wrocław) on 15 April 1908. Falkenhayn retired on 2 May 1910, was promoted to "General der Kavallerie" and appointed Oberhofmeister (Lord Chamberlain) of Empress Augusta Viktoria.

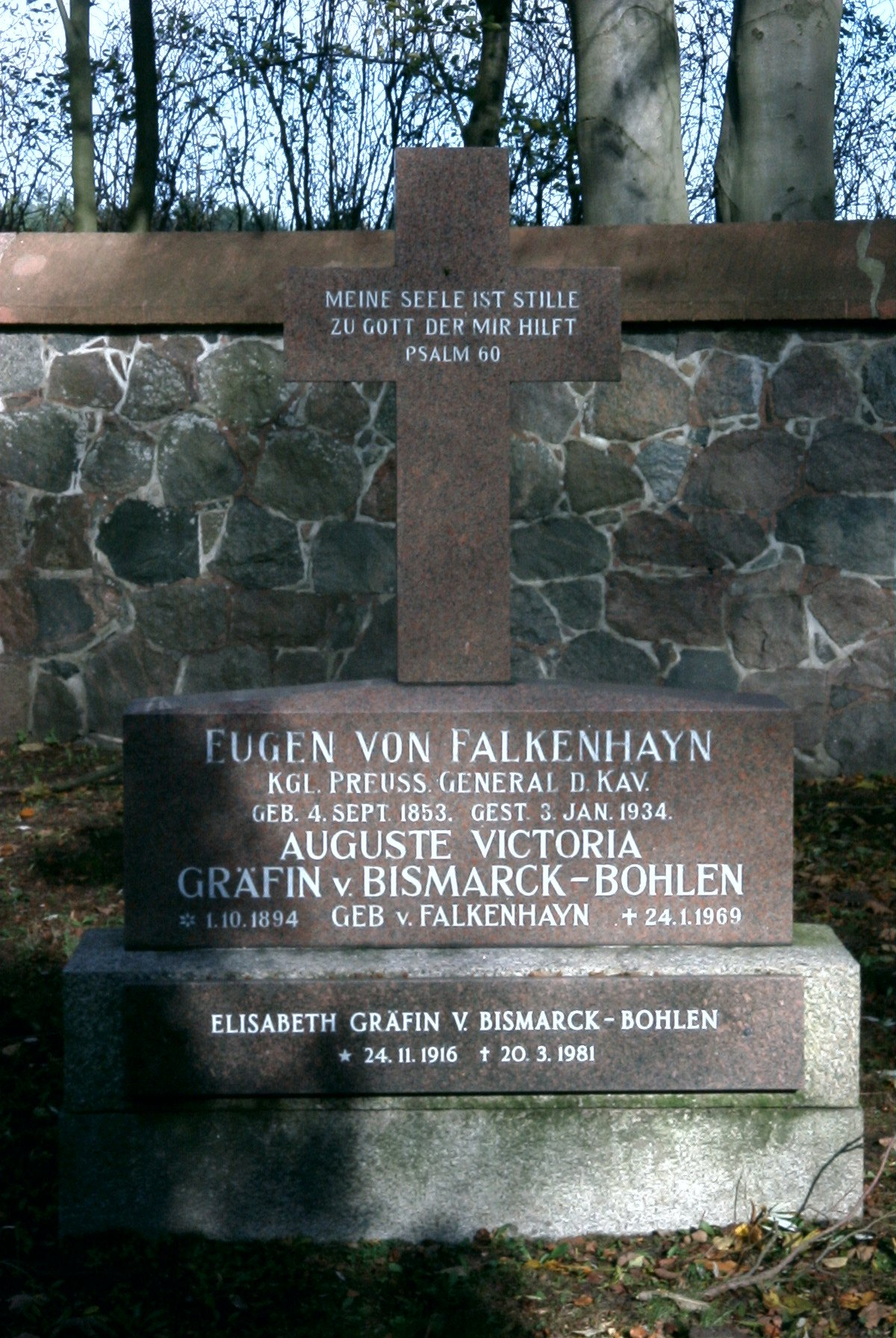
Eugen von Falkenhayn's grave in Steinfurth near Karlsburg in Western Pomerania

Falkenhayn was reactivated in the beginning of World War I and became commanding general of the XXII Reserve Corps on 10 September 1914. His Corps fought in the Battle of Flandres, in the Battle of Gorlice-Tarnów, in Serbia as part of the Austrian III Army under General Kövess. In 1916 the XXII Reserve Corps was deployed at the Battle of Verdun and sent to the Eastern Front (World War I) to counter the Brusilov Offensive, it returned to Germany in November 1918 and Falkenhayn retired on 30 June 1919.

Falkenhayn died in Berlin-Lichterfelde on 3 January 1934.

=== Family ===
Falkenhayn married Louise von Dörnberg in 1893, his granddaughter Maria von Quistorp was the wife of Wernher von Braun.

=== Decorations and awards ===
- Order of the Red Eagle
- Order of the Crown III class
- Knights Cross of the House Order of Hohenzollern
- Prussian Service Award
- Commander of the Order o Albert the Bear
- Order of Henry the Lion (II class)
- Commander of the Order of the Griffon
- House and Merit Order of Peter Frederick Louis
- Albert Order
- Order of the Crown (Württemberg)
- Commander of the Royal Victorian Order
- Order of Saints Maurice and Lazarus
- Commander of the Order of the Crown (Italy)
- Commander of the Order of Orange-Nassau
- Commander of the Order of Franz Joseph
- Commander of the Order of the Crown (Romania)
- Pour le Mérite (28 August 1915) with Oak leaves (13 November 1915)
