= Białochowo =

- Village
- Location within Poland
- Coordinates: 53°33′N 18°52′E
- Country: Poland
- Voivodeship: Kuyavian-Pomeranian
- County: Grudziądz
- Gmina: Rogóźno
- Population: 580
- Time zone: UTC+1 (CET)
  - Summer (DST): UTC+2 (CEST)
- Vehicle registration: CGR

Białochowo [bjawɔˈxɔvɔ] is a village in the administrative district of Gmina Rogóźno, within Grudziądz County, Kuyavian-Pomeranian Voivodeship, in north-central Poland.

== History ==
During the German occupation of Poland (World War II), in 1939, it was the site of the Białochowo massacre, in which 200 Poles, including farmers, policemen, and also women and children, were murdered by the Selbstschutz and SS (see Nazi crimes against the Polish nation).

== Transport ==
The Polish National road 55 runs nearby, west of the village.

== Notable residents ==
- Erich von Falkenhayn (1861–1922), German Chief of Staff of World War I
- Eugen von Falkenhayn (1853-1934), German General
