= 44th Reserve Division =

44th Reserve Division (44. Reserve-Division)
- Active: 1914-1919
- Country: Germany
- Branch: Army
- Type: Infantry
- Size: Approx. 15,000
- Engagements: World War I: Race to the Sea, Gorlice-Tarnów Offensive, Serbian Campaign, Battle of Verdun, Battle of the Somme, Second Battle of the Aisne, Passchendaele

The 44th Reserve Division (44. Reserve-Division) was a unit of the Imperial German Army in World War I. The division was formed in August 1914 and organized over the next two months. It was part of the first wave of new divisions formed at the outset of World War I, which were numbered the 43rd through 54th Reserve Divisions. The division was disbanded in 1919 during the demobilization of the German Army after World War I. The division was part of the XXII Reserve Corps and was recruited primarily in the Prussian Province of Brandenburg, but the 208th Reserve Infantry Regiment was raised in the Province of Hanover and the Duchy of Brunswick.

== Combat chronicle ==
The 44th Reserve Division initially fought on the Western Front, fighting on the Yser in October–November 1914 and storming Diksmuide in mid-November. It remained in positional warfare along the Yser until June 1915, and fought around Ypres in April–May. In June, it was transferred to the Eastern Front. It fought in the Gorlice-Tarnów Offensive, including the 1915 Battle of Lemberg and the assault on Brest-Litovsk. It then participated in the Serbian Campaign. After the campaign, it remained in reserve until returning to the Western Front in February 1916. It then fought in the Battle of Verdun. In July 1916 the division fought in the Battle of the Somme and then occupied various parts of the trenchline. In April 1917, it fought in the Second Battle of the Aisne, also known as the Third Battle of Champagne (and to the Germans as the Double Battle on the Aisne and in the Champagne). Thereafter, the division went into the trenchline around Verdun, remaining there until October 1917, when it joined the Battle of Passchendaele. The division then remained in the line mainly around Flanders until September 1917, when it went to Lorraine. It ended the war at the Germans' Antwerp/Meuse position. In 1918, Allied intelligence rated the division as first class, although in 1917 it had noted shortcomings in the division's performance as an assault division.

== Order of battle on formation ==
The 44th Reserve Division was initially organized as a square division, with essentially the same organization as the reserve divisions formed on mobilization. The order of battle of the 44th Reserve Division on September 10, 1914, was as follows:

- 87. Reserve-Infanterie-Brigade
  - Reserve-Infanterie-Regiment Nr. 205
  - Reserve-Infanterie-Regiment Nr. 206
  - Reserve-Jäger-Bataillon Nr. 16
- 88. Reserve-Infanterie-Brigade
  - Reserve-Infanterie-Regiment Nr. 207
  - Reserve-Infanterie-Regiment Nr. 208
- Reserve-Kavallerie-Abteilung Nr. 44
- Reserve-Feldartillerie-Regiment Nr. 44
- Reserve-Pionier-Kompanie Nr. 44

== Order of battle on April 9, 1918 ==
The 44th Reserve Division was triangularized in January 1917. Over the course of the war, other changes took place, including the formation of artillery and signals commands and a pioneer battalion. The order of battle on April 9, 1918, was as follows:

- 87. Reserve-Infanterie-Brigade
  - Reserve-Infanterie-Regiment Nr. 205
  - Reserve-Infanterie-Regiment Nr. 206
  - Reserve-Infanterie-Regiment Nr. 208
- Reserve-Kavallerie-Abteilung Nr. 44
- Artillerie-Kommandeur 44
  - Reserve-Feldartillerie-Regiment Nr. 44
  - II.Bataillon/Fußartillerie-Regiment Nr. 21
- Stab Pionier-Bataillon Nr. 344
  - Reserve-Pionier-Kompanie Nr. 44
  - 5.Kompanie/Pionier-Bataillon Nr. 29
  - Minenwerfer-Kompanie Nr. 244
- Divisions-Nachrichten-Kommandeur 444
