= Robert Kosch =

German General of the Infantry (1856–1942)

Robert Paul Theodor Kosch
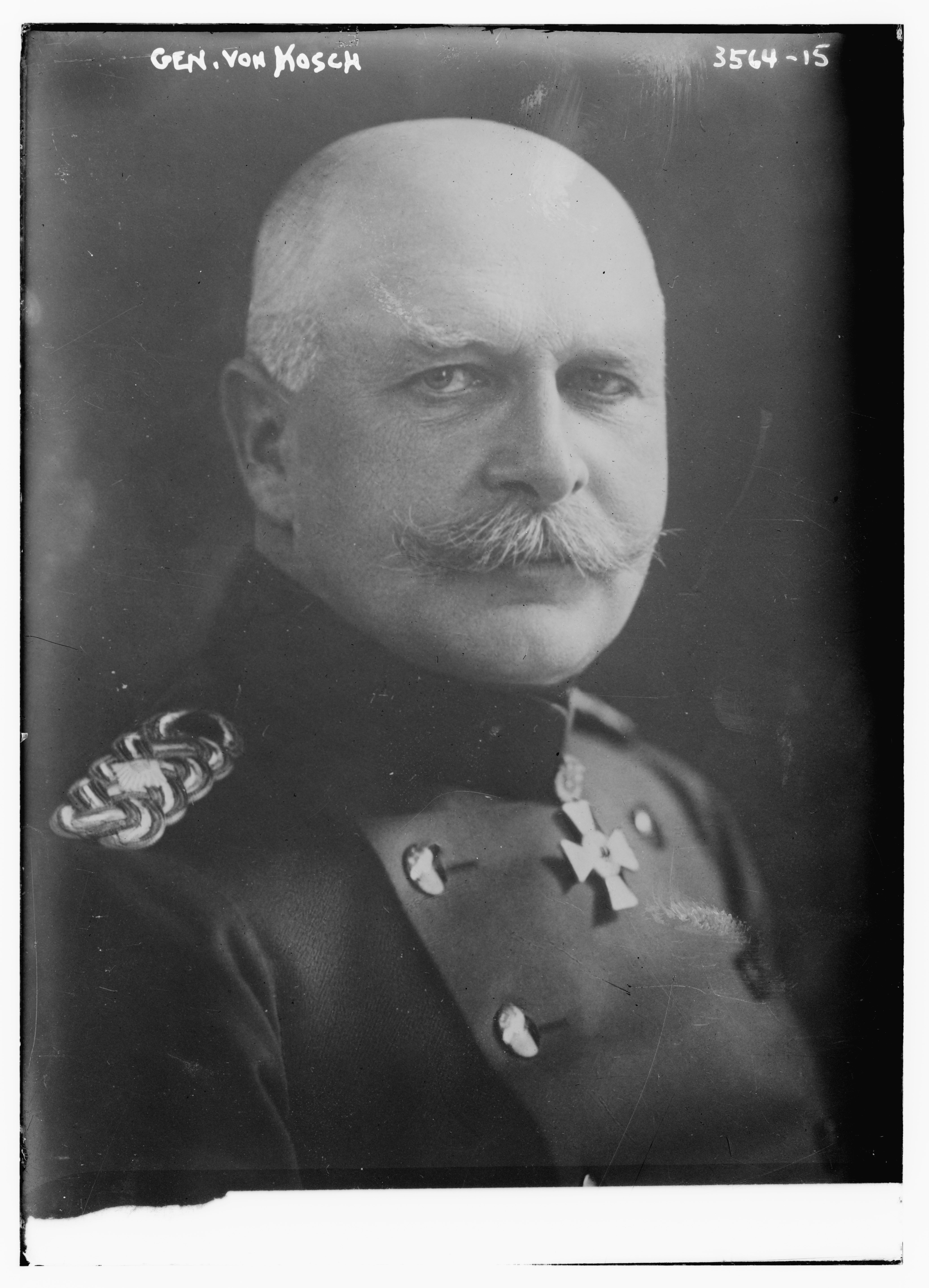
- Born: 5 April 1856; Glatz, Kingdom of Prussia, German Confederation (now Kłodzko, Poland)
- Died: 22 December 1942 (aged 86); Berlin, Nazi Germany
- Burial place: Invalid's Cemetery, Berlin; 52°31′55.8″N 13°22′15.8″E
- Military career
- Allegiance: German Empire
- Branch: Prussian Army
- Service years: 1874–1919
- Rank: General of the Infantry
- Commands: Infantry Regiment No. 64; 78th Infantry Brigade; 10th Division; I. Army Corps; X. Reserve Corps; Danube Army; 9th Army
- Conflicts: World War I
- Awards: Order of the Red Eagle; Pour le Merite with Oak Leaves

Robert Paul Theodor von Kosch (5 April 1856 – 22 December 1942) was a Prussian General of the Infantry during World War I.

== Early life ==
Robert was the youngest of ten children of Hermann and Agnes Kosch. After attending the Cadet corps, on 23 April 1874 Kosch graduated as a Sekonde-Leutnant in the (4th Lower Silesian) Infantry Regiment No. 51 of the Prussian Army. From 1877 to 1880 he studied at the Military Academy. On 3 April 1880 he married Gertrude Noeggerath, with whom he had three daughters.

== Career ==
From 1 April 1881 to 31 March 1887 he was posted as battalion and regimental adjutant to Infantry Regiment No. 132 in Glatz. On 1 April 1887 he was seconded to the General Staff to Berlin. After a number of regimental and staff assignments Kosch was promoted to Oberst on 22 April 1905 and took command of the Landwehrbezirk II in Berlin. On 16 February 1907 he took command of the 8. Brandenburgisches Infanterie-Regiment „General-Feldmarschall Prinz Friedrich Karl von Preußen“ Nr. 64 in Prenzlau.

On 19 August 1909 he was promoted to Generalmajor and assigned to the 78th Infantry Brigade in Brieg. On 22 April 1912 he was made Generalleutnant and he was appointed commander of the 10th Division in Posen.

After the outbreak of World War I he led his division into the Loraine region on the Western Front. On 9 October 1914, he became commander of the I. Army Corps in Lithuania, where his troops opposed numerically superior Russian forces. After initial tactical setbacks Kosch and his men finally won the Second Battle of the Masurian Lakes. For this victory Kosch was awarded the Pour le Mérite. On 11 June 1915 he was appointed Commanding General of the X. Reserve Corps. He led them in the battles on the Dniester, the Battle of Gnila Lipa and at Krasnostaw. He transferred to the Balkans Theater, where he fought against Serbia. For his success Kosch received, on 27 November 1915, the Oak Leaves to his Pour le Mérite.

At the end of February 1916 the Battle of Verdun began, and Kosch was in it. He was promoted to General der Infanterie on 18 August 1916.
Ten days later he assumed command of the newly formed General Command No. 52, a.k.a. the Danube Army; that was used in the Bulgarian Danube region. The multi-day battle at Argeș, in late November to early December 1916, culminating in a Romanian defeat, led to the occupation of Bucharest and the crumbling of Romania's western and northwestern front sectors. From 1 May 1917 on he temporarily led the 9th Army until the arrival of Johannes von Eben. After dissolution of the Danube Army in March 1918 Kosch participated in the occupation of Ukraine and the struggles against the Red Army. On 1 May 1918 he was appointed commander of all troops in Taurida and the Crimea.

Directly after the war he commanded the Border Guard East, effectively all German forces east of Berlin, before he retired from the Army on 10 January 1919. Kosch died in 1942 and was buried in the Invalids' Cemetery. His grave did not survive.

== Awards and decorations ==
- Prussia: Pour le Merite (20 February 1915) with Oak Leaves (27 November 1915)
- Prussia: Order of the Red Eagle I. Class with Oak Leaves and Swords (6 August 1818)
- Prussia: Order of the Crown II. Class (18 January 1909)
- Prussia: Iron Cross I. Class (1914) and II. Class (1914)
- Anhalt: Friedrich Cross (17 October 1916)
- Hamburg: Hanseatic Cross (10 June 1916)
- Saxony: Golden Grand Cross of the Albert Order with Swords (22 August 1917)
- Austria-Hungary: Grand Cross of the Order of Leopold with Swords (13 September 1917)
- Austria-Hungary: Order of the Iron Crown I. Class with War Decoration (31 August 1915)
- Bulgaria: Order of Saint Alexander (14 March 1917)
- Ottoman Empire: Iron Crescent (20 January 1916)

== Notes ==
Military offices
Preceded by General der Infanterie Erich von Falkenhayn	Commander, 9th Army; 1 May – 10 June 1917	Succeeded by General der Infanterie Johannes von Eben
