= Landwehr Corps =

Military unit

Landwehr Corps Landwehrkorps
- Flag of the Staff of a Generalkommando (1871–1918)
- Active: 2 August 1914 - post November 1918
- Country: German Empire
- Type: Corps
- Size: Approximately 38,000 (on formation)
- Engagements: World War I

The Landwehr Corps (German: Landwehrkorps) was a corps level command of the German Army in World War I.

== Formation ==
The Landwehr Corps was formed on the outbreak of war in August 1914 as part of the mobilisation of the Army. It was initially commanded by General der Infanterie Remus von Woyrsch, who had been recalled from retirement. It was still in existence at the end of the war.

=== Structure on formation ===
On formation, in August 1914, the Landwehr Corps consisted of two divisions, which were made up of 3rd line units. The Senior Landwehr Commander 3 was formed with units drawn from V Corps District (Province of Posen and Lower Silesia) and Senior Landwehr Commander 4 was formed with units drawn from VI Corps District (Province of Silesia, particularly Upper Silesia). It mobilised with 34 infantry battalions (considerably above the norm), just four machine gun platoons (eight machine guns), nine cavalry squadrons, four field artillery batteries (24 guns) and two pioneer companies.

Corps	Division	Brigade	Units
Landwehr Corps	Senior Landwehr Commander 3 (3rd Landwehr Division)	17th Landwehr Infantry Brigade	6th Landwehr Infantry Regiment
Landwehr Corps	Senior Landwehr Commander 3 (3rd Landwehr Division)	17th Landwehr Infantry Brigade	7th Landwehr Infantry Regiment
Landwehr Corps	Senior Landwehr Commander 3 (3rd Landwehr Division)	18th Landwehr Infantry Brigade	37th Landwehr Infantry Regiment
Landwehr Corps	Senior Landwehr Commander 3 (3rd Landwehr Division)	18th Landwehr Infantry Brigade	46th Landwehr Infantry Regiment
Landwehr Corps	Senior Landwehr Commander 3 (3rd Landwehr Division)	17th Ersatz Infantry Brigade	17th Brigade Ersatz Battalion
Landwehr Corps	Senior Landwehr Commander 3 (3rd Landwehr Division)	17th Ersatz Infantry Brigade	18th Brigade Ersatz Battalion
Landwehr Corps	Senior Landwehr Commander 3 (3rd Landwehr Division)	17th Ersatz Infantry Brigade	19th Brigade Ersatz Battalion
Landwehr Corps	Senior Landwehr Commander 3 (3rd Landwehr Division)	17th Ersatz Infantry Brigade	20th Brigade Ersatz Battalion
Landwehr Corps	Senior Landwehr Commander 3 (3rd Landwehr Division)	17th Ersatz Infantry Brigade	77th Brigade Ersatz Battalion
Landwehr Corps	Senior Landwehr Commander 3 (3rd Landwehr Division)		1st Landwehr Cavalry Regiment
Landwehr Corps	Senior Landwehr Commander 3 (3rd Landwehr Division)		1st Landwehr Battery of V Corps
Landwehr Corps	Senior Landwehr Commander 3 (3rd Landwehr Division)		2nd Landwehr Battery of V Corps
Landwehr Corps	Senior Landwehr Commander 3 (3rd Landwehr Division)		Reserve Company, 5th Pioneer Battalion
Landwehr Corps	Senior Landwehr Commander 3 (3rd Landwehr Division)		1st Landwehr Divisional Pontoon Train
Landwehr Corps	Senior Landwehr Commander 3 (3rd Landwehr Division)		Reserve Telephone Section
Landwehr Corps	Senior Landwehr Commander 4 (4th Landwehr Division)	22nd Landwehr Infantry Brigade	11th Landwehr Infantry Regiment
Landwehr Corps	Senior Landwehr Commander 4 (4th Landwehr Division)	22nd Landwehr Infantry Brigade	51st Landwehr Infantry Regiment
Landwehr Corps	Senior Landwehr Commander 4 (4th Landwehr Division)	23rd Landwehr Infantry Brigade	22nd Landwehr Infantry Regiment
Landwehr Corps	Senior Landwehr Commander 4 (4th Landwehr Division)	23rd Landwehr Infantry Brigade	23rd Landwehr Infantry Regiment
Landwehr Corps	Senior Landwehr Commander 4 (4th Landwehr Division)	21st Ersatz Infantry Brigade	21st Brigade Ersatz Battalion
Landwehr Corps	Senior Landwehr Commander 4 (4th Landwehr Division)	21st Ersatz Infantry Brigade	22nd Brigade Ersatz Battalion
Landwehr Corps	Senior Landwehr Commander 4 (4th Landwehr Division)	21st Ersatz Infantry Brigade	23rd Brigade Ersatz Battalion
Landwehr Corps	Senior Landwehr Commander 4 (4th Landwehr Division)	21st Ersatz Infantry Brigade	24th Brigade Ersatz Battalion
Landwehr Corps	Senior Landwehr Commander 4 (4th Landwehr Division)	21st Ersatz Infantry Brigade	78th Brigade Ersatz Battalion
Landwehr Corps	Senior Landwehr Commander 4 (4th Landwehr Division)		2nd Landwehr Cavalry Regiment
Landwehr Corps	Senior Landwehr Commander 4 (4th Landwehr Division)		Ersatz Cavalry Regiment
Landwehr Corps	Senior Landwehr Commander 4 (4th Landwehr Division)		1st Landwehr Battery of VI Corps
Landwehr Corps	Senior Landwehr Commander 4 (4th Landwehr Division)		2nd Landwehr Battery of VI Corps
Landwehr Corps	Senior Landwehr Commander 4 (4th Landwehr Division)		Reserve Company, 6th Pioneer Battalion
Landwehr Corps	Senior Landwehr Commander 4 (4th Landwehr Division)		2nd Landwehr Divisional Pontoon Train
Landwehr Corps	Senior Landwehr Commander 4 (4th Landwehr Division)		Reserve Telephone Section
Landwehr Corps	Corps Troops		Landwehr Munitions Column Section
Landwehr Corps	Corps Troops		Four Landwehr Telephone Columns
Landwehr Corps	Corps Troops		Two LoC Motor Vehicle Columns
Landwehr Corps	Corps Troops		Two Landwehr Bakery Columns
Landwehr Corps	Corps Troops		Two Magazine Supply Parks

== Combat chronicle ==
On mobilisation, the Landwehr Corps was assigned to the 8th Army on the Eastern Front. Whilst the 8th Army was concentrated in East Prussia, the Landwehr Corps was detached to Upper Silesia. On 4 September 1914, it came under the command of 1st Austro-Hungarian Army. Due to losses suffered by the 4th Landwehr Division in the Battle of Tarnawka (7–9 September 1914), the 11th and 51st Landwehr Infantry Regiments were reduced to a single battalion each; the 22nd and 23rd Landwehr Infantry Regiments were reduced to two battalions each.

On 14 September 1914, the Brigade Ersatz Battalions of the 21st Ersatz Infantry Brigade were dissolved and their manpower used to replace combat losses in the following battalions:

21st Brigade Ersatz Battalion absorbed into II Battalion, 51st Landwehr Infantry Regiment
22nd Brigade Ersatz Battalion absorbed into II Battalion, 11th Landwehr Infantry Regiment
23rd Brigade Ersatz Battalion absorbed into II Battalion, 51st Landwehr Infantry Regiment
24th Brigade Ersatz Battalion absorbed into II Battalion, 11th Landwehr Infantry Regiment
78th Brigade Ersatz Battalion absorbed into II Battalion, 78th Landwehr Infantry Regiment

On 25 September 1914, the Brigade Ersatz Battalions of the 17th Ersatz Infantry Brigade were likewise dissolved:

17th Brigade Ersatz Battalion absorbed into III Battalion, 23rd Landwehr Infantry Regiment
18th Brigade Ersatz Battalion absorbed into III Battalion, 51st Landwehr Infantry Regiment
19th Brigade Ersatz Battalion absorbed into III Battalion, 22nd Landwehr Infantry Regiment
20th Brigade Ersatz Battalion absorbed into III Battalion, 22nd Landwehr Infantry Regiment
77th Brigade Ersatz Battalion absorbed into III Battalion, 11th Landwehr Infantry Regiment

The Landwehr Corps joined the 9th Army on 24 September 1914.

== Commanders ==
The Landwehr Corps had the following commanders during its existence:

From	Rank	Name
2 August 1914	General der Infanterie	Remus von Woyrsch
23 September 1916	General der Infanterie	Günther Graf von Kirchbach
23 April 1917	General der Infanterie	Artur von Brietzke

From 3 November 1914, von Woyrsch was assigned to concurrently command Armee-Abteilung Woyrsch. A deputy, Generalleutnant Götz Freiherr von König, took command of the Landwehr Corps on 3 December 1914.

== See also ==
- German Army order of battle (1914)
- Imperial-Royal Landwehr

== Bibliography ==
- Cron, Hermann (2002). Imperial German Army 1914-18: Organisation, Structure, Orders-of-Battle [first published: 1937]. Helion & Co. ISBN 1-874622-70-1.
- Ellis, John; Cox, Michael (1993). The World War I Databook. Aurum Press Ltd. ISBN 1-85410-766-6.
- Busche, Hartwig (1998). Formationsgeschichte der Deutschen Infanterie im Ersten Weltkrieg (1914 bis 1918) (in German). Institut für Preußische Historiographie.
- Robinson, Janet; Robinson, Joe (2009). Handbook of Imperial Germany. Authorhouse.
- Histories of Two Hundred and Fifty-One Divisions of the German Army which Participated in the War (1914-1918), compiled from records of Intelligence section of the General Staff, American Expeditionary Forces, at General Headquarters, Chaumont, France 1919. The London Stamp Exchange Ltd. 1989 [1920]. ISBN 0-948130-87-3.
- The German Forces in the Field; 7th Revision, 11th November 1918; Compiled by the General Staff, War Office. Imperial War Museum, London and the Battery Press. 1995 [1918]. ISBN 978-1-870423-95-3.
