= Army Group Prince Leopold of Bavaria =

WW1 German Army command on the Eastern Front

The Army Group Prince Leopold of Bavaria (German: Heeresgruppe Prinz Leopold von Bayern) was an Army Group of the German Army, which operated against Russia between 5 August 1915 and 15 December 1917 during World War I. It was renamed Army Group Woyrsch on 29 August 1916.

== 1915 - 1917 ==
This Army Group was established in August 1915 after the conquest of Warsaw by the 9th Army under command of Prince Leopold of Bavaria. It was only composed of the 9th Army and an Army Detachment. When the 9th Army was disbanded in July 1916 to be reformed in the Balkans, the Army Group remained in existence, but now under command of von Woyrsch, because Prince Leopold of Bavaria became Supreme commander of the Eastern Front. The Army Group was finally disbanded on 15 December 1917.

=== Composition ===
- 9th Army (Prince Leopold of Bavaria) (until July 1916)
- Army Detachment Woyrsch (Remus von Woyrsch)

== Sources ==
- Die Deutschen Heeresgruppen im Ersten Weltkrieg
- Bundesarchiv : Die deutschen Heeresgruppen Teil 1, Erster Weltkrieg
