= 3rd Landwehr Division =

3rd Landwehr Division (3. Landwehr-Division)
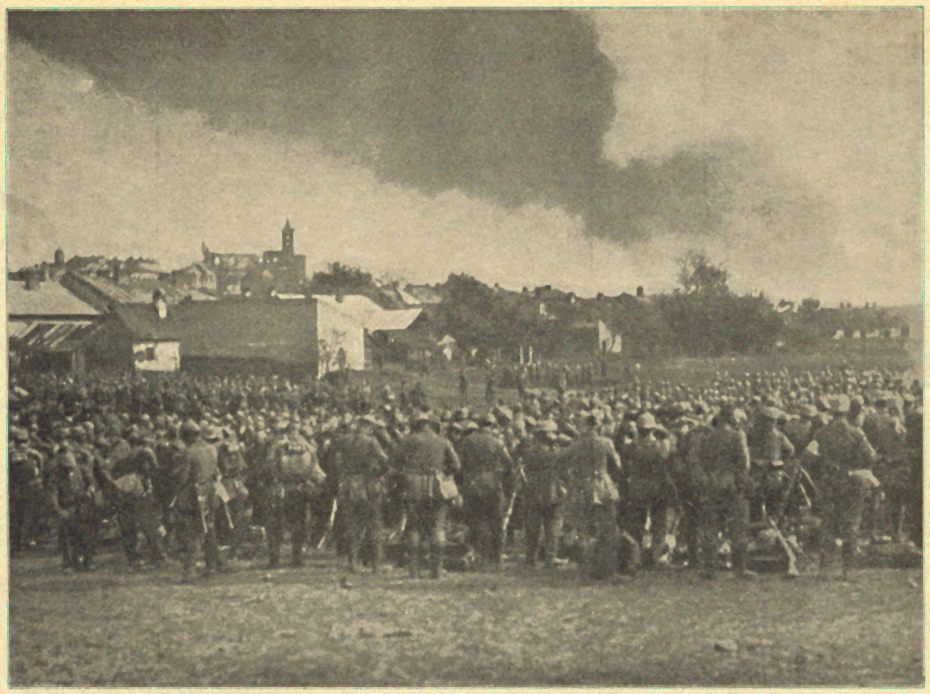
- Active: 1914-1919
- Country: Germany
- Branch: Army
- Type: Infantry
- Size: Approx. 15,000
- Engagements: World War I: Gorlice-Tarnów Offensive

The 3rd Landwehr Division (3. Landwehr-Division) was an infantry division of the Imperial German Army during World War I. It was formed on the mobilization of the German Army in August 1914 under the "Higher Landwehr Commander 3" (Höherer Landwehr-Kommandeur 3). The Landwehr was the third category of the German Army, after the regular Army and the reserves. Thus Landwehr divisions were made up of older soldiers who had passed from the reserves, and were intended primarily for occupation and security duties rather than heavy combat. While the division was a Landwehr formation, at the beginning of the war it also had an attached Ersatz infantry brigade, made up of cadres from various regimental replacement battalions (this brigade was dissolved in September 1914). The division was primarily raised in the Prussian provinces of Posen, Lower Silesia, and West Prussia. The division was disbanded in 1919 during the demobilization of the German Army after World War I.

== Combat chronicle ==
The 3rd Landwehr Division fought on the Eastern Front in World War I. It was on the front in Poland from the early days, and participated in the Gorlice-Tarnów Offensive, crossing the Vistula in July and advancing toward the Bug, and eventually reaching the line between the Servech and Shchara rivers, where the front stabilized. It remained in the line there until the armistice on the Eastern Front in December 1917. Thereafter, the division served in Ukraine and in the German occupation forces in Russia until late September 1918, when it went to the Western Front, serving in the Flanders area until the end of the war. Allied intelligence rated the division as fourth class and of mediocre combat value.

== Order of battle on mobilization ==
The order of battle of the 3rd Landwehr Division on mobilization in August 1914 was as follows:

- 17.Landwehr-Infanterie-Brigade
  - Landwehr-Infanterie-Regiment Nr. 6
  - Landwehr-Infanterie-Regiment Nr. 7
- 18.Landwehr-Infanterie-Brigade
  - Landwehr-Infanterie-Regiment Nr. 37
  - Landwehr-Infanterie-Regiment Nr. 46
- 17.Ersatz-Infanterie-Brigade
  - Brigade-Ersatz-Bataillon Nr. 17
  - Brigade-Ersatz-Bataillon Nr. 18
  - Brigade-Ersatz-Bataillon Nr. 19
  - Brigade-Ersatz-Bataillon Nr. 20
  - Brigade-Ersatz-Bataillon Nr. 77
- Landwehr-Kavallerie-Regiment Nr. 1
- 1.Landsturm-Batterie/V.Armeekorps
- 2.Landsturm-Batterie/V.Armeekorps
- Ersatz-Abteilung/1. Posensches Feldartillerie-Regiment Nr. 20
- Ersatz-Abteilung/2. Niederschlesisches Feldartillerie-Regiment Nr. 41
- Ersatz-Kompanie/Niederschlesisches Pionier-Bataillon Nr. 5

On September 25, 1914, the 17th Ersatz Infantry Brigade was dissolved and its constituent units used to replace losses suffered by the 4th Landwehr Division in the Battle of Tarnawka (7–9 September 1914) as follows:

17th Brigade Ersatz Battalion absorbed into III Battalion, 23rd Landwehr Infantry Regiment
18th Brigade Ersatz Battalion absorbed into III Battalion, 51st Landwehr Infantry Regiment
19th Brigade Ersatz Battalion absorbed into III Battalion, 22nd Landwehr Infantry Regiment
20th Brigade Ersatz Battalion absorbed into III Battalion, 22nd Landwehr Infantry Regiment
77th Brigade Ersatz Battalion absorbed into III Battalion, 11th Landwehr Infantry Regiment

== Order of battle on March 18, 1918 ==
The division underwent several structural changes as the war progressed. It was triangularized in September 1916, sending the 18th Landwehr Infantry Brigade to the 217th Infantry Division. The cavalry was reduced, pioneers were increased to a full battalion, and an artillery command and a divisional signals command were created. The division's order of battle on March 18, 1918, was as follows:

- 17.Landwehr-Infanterie-Brigade
  - Landwehr-Infanterie-Regiment Nr. 6
  - Landwehr-Infanterie-Regiment Nr. 7
  - Landwehr-Infanterie-Regiment Nr. 46
- 1.Eskadron/Dragoner-Regiment von Bredow (1. Schlesisches) Nr. 4
- Artillerie-Kommandeur 130
  - Landwehr-Feldartillerie-Regiment Nr. 3
- 1.Ersatz-Kompanie/Niederschlesisches Pionier-Bataillon Nr. 5
- Divisions-Nachrichten-Kommandeur 503
