= 52nd Corps (German Empire) =

52nd Corps (Generalkommando zbV 52)
- Flag of the Staff of a Generalkommando (1871–1918)
- Active: September 1916-1919
- Disbanded: 1919
- Country: German Empire
- Branch: Army
- Engagements: World War I

Insignia
- Abbreviation: Genkdo zbV 52

The 52nd Corps (German: Generalkommando zbV 52) was a corps formation of the German Army in World War I. It was formed in September 1916 and was still in existence at the end of the war.

== Chronicle ==
The 52nd Corps (z.b.V.) was formed in September 1916. With the onset of trench warfare, the German Army recognised that it was no longer possible to maintain the traditional Corps unit, that is, one made up of two divisions. Whereas at some times (and in some places) a Corps of two divisions was sufficient, at other times 5 or 6 divisions were necessary. Therefore, under the Hindenburg regime (from summer 1916), new Corps headquarters were created without organic divisions. These new Corps were designated General Commands for Special Use (German: Generalkommandos zur besonderen Verwendung).

The 52nd Corps took part in the Romanian Campaign. From the time it was raised, up until January 1918, 52nd Corps was also known as the Army of the Danube (German: Donau-Armee) though it never reached the strength of an Army.

== Commanders ==
The 52nd Corps was commanded throughout its existence by General der Infanterie Robert Kosch.

== See also ==
- German Army (German Empire)

== Bibliography ==
- Cron, Hermann (2002). Imperial German Army 1914-18: Organisation, Structure, Orders-of-Battle [first published: 1937]. Helion & Co. ISBN 1-874622-70-1.
- Ellis, John; Cox, Michael (1993). The World War I Databook. Aurum Press Ltd. ISBN 1-85410-766-6.
