= Erich von Falkenhayn =

German general (1861–1922)

- Falkenhayn, c. 1913

Prussian Minister of War
- In office 7 July 1913 – 20 January 1915
- Monarch: Wilhelm II
- Prime Minister: Theobald von Bethmann Hollweg
- Preceded by: Josias von Heeringen
- Succeeded by: Adolf Wild von Hohenborn

Chief of the Great General Staff
- In office 14 September 1914 – 29 August 1916
- Monarch: Wilhelm II
- Chancellor: Theobald von Bethmann Hollweg
- Preceded by: Helmuth von Moltke the Younger
- Succeeded by: Paul von Hindenburg

Personal details
- Born: 11 September 1861 Belchau Castle, Kingdom of Prussia, German Confederation (now Poland)
- Died: 8 April 1922 (aged 60) Lindstedt Castle near Potsdam, Prussia, Weimar Republic
- Spouse: Ida Selkmann
- Relations: Eugen von Falkenhayn (brother); Fedor von Bock (nephew); Henning von Tresckow (son-in-law)
- Children: 2
- Profession: Military officer
- Awards: Order of the Black Eagle; Pour le Merite; Military Order of Max Joseph

Military service
- Allegiance: German Empire (1880–1919); Ottoman Empire (1917–1918)
- Branch/service: Prussian Army; Imperial German Army; Ottoman Army
- Years of service: 1880–1919
- Rank: General der Infanterie (Imperial German Army) Field Marshal (Ottoman Army)
- Commands: Chief of the German General Staff; 9th Army; Army Group F (Ottoman Army); 10th Army
- Battles/wars: Boxer Rebellion; First World War

Erich Georg Anton Sebastian von Falkenhayn (11 September 1861 – 8 April 1922) was a German general and Ottoman Field Marshal who served as Prussian Minister of War and Chief of the German General Staff during the First World War. Falkenhayn replaced General Helmuth von Moltke the Younger in September 1914 after his invasion of France was stopped at the First Battle of the Marne and was in turn removed on 29 August 1916 after the failure of his offensive strategy in the west at the Battle of Verdun, the opening of the Battle of the Somme, the Brusilov Offensive and the Romanian entry into the war. Having planned to win the war before 1917, the German army was reduced to hanging on.

Falkenhayn was given important field commands in Romania and Syria. As a commander in the Middle East, he prevented a planned Ottoman deportation of Jews from Palestine. His reputation as a war leader was attacked in Germany during and after the war, especially by the faction supporting Field Marshal Paul von Hindenburg. Falkenhayn held the belief that Germany could not win the war by a decisive battle but would have to reach a compromise peace; his enemies said he lacked the resolve necessary to win a decisive victory. Falkenhayn's relations with the Chancellor Theobald von Bethmann Hollweg were troubled and undercut Falkenhayn's plans.

== Early life ==
Falkenhayn was born in Burg Belchau, a village near Graudenz, now Białochowo in Poland, to Fedor von Falkenhayn (1814–1896) and Franziska von Falkenhayn, née von Rosenberg (1826–1888). His ancestors could be traced to 1504. His brother Arthur (1857–1929) became tutor of Crown Prince Wilhelm and another brother Eugen (1853–1934) became a Prussian General of Cavalry. His only sister Olga von Falkenhayn was the mother of Field Marshal Fedor von Bock.

== Military career ==
Becoming a cadet at the age of 11, Falkenhayn joined the Army in 1880 as Second Lieutenant. He served as an infantry and staff officer. He became First Lieutenant in 1889 and Hauptmann (captain) in 1893, subsequently transferring to the topographical department of the German General Staff. He was seen as a capable, deliberate officer with an open mind. In 1896, von Falkenhayn took a leave of absence and served Qing-Dynasty China as a military consultant and helped to establish some Chinese sea ports. In 1899, he returned to German service in the new Kiautschou Bay Leased Territory in China where he was tasked with forming the "Chinese Company." At that time, his younger brother, Captain (promoted on 27 January 1896) Kurt Georg Anton von Falkenhayn (1863–1942), was commander of the 3rd Company/III. Marine Infantry Battalion (III. Seebataillon) in Tsingtau. The "Chinese Company" received German training personnel: two officers, ten non-commissioned officers, and 14 enlisted men. 1st Lieutenant von Schoeler was appointed commander of the company (with an establishment of 120 foot soldiers and 20 horsemen). In March 1899, he became an active Major in the Army but stayed in Tsingtau until January 1900.

On 24 February 1900, he was assigned to the General Staff of the Army and was commanded to the Great General Staff. On 29 March 1900, he was transferred to the General Staff of the XIV. Army Corps. On 9 July 1900, he was transferred to the General Staff of the German East Asian Expeditionary Corps in China (under Lieutenant General Emil von Lessel). He saw action during the Boxer Rebellion as a general staff officer of Alfred von Waldersee and spent time in Manchuria and Korea. Service in Asia made Falkenhayn to be a favourite of the Kaiser and he became one of the military instructors of Crown Prince Wilhelm of Prussia.

After his service in Asia, the army posted him to Brunswick, Metz and Magdeburg as a battalion commander. On 10 April 1906, Falkenhayn became a section chief of the German General Staff. In 1907, Falkenhayn became Chief of Staff of the XVI Corps. In 1908, Falkenhayn was promoted to Oberst (colonel). On 27 January 1911, Falkenhayn was appointed to command the 4th Guards Regiment. On 22 April 1912, he was promoted to Generalmajor and on 20 February 1913, he was appointed the Chief of General Staff of the IV Corps.

=== Prussian Minister of War (1913–1914) ===
On 7 July 1913, von Falkenhayn was promoted to Generalleutnant and was simultaneously appointed Prussian Minister of State and War, succeeding Josias von Heeringen, who was considered to be inactive. During the Zabern Affair, Falkenhayn, as the minister, was part of the conference to end the affair. During the July Crisis, he was at the meeting on 5 July 1914 when Germany announced to Austria-Hungary its support for war. Like most German military leaders, he did not expect a great European war but he soon embraced the idea and joined others in wanting Wilhelm II to declare war. He later noted in his diary, after a discussion with the Kaiser in the Neues Palais in Potsdam, "He makes confused speeches. The only thing that emerges clearly is that he no longer wants war, even if it means letting Austria down. I point out that he no longer has control over the situation". Falkenhayn wanted early mobilisation since the Kaiser started to secure his palace; when the war began Falkenhayn viewed this with enthusiasm. He assured the Kaiser that the German Army was ready. He told the chancellor, Theobald von Bethmann Hollweg that "Even if we perish over this, it will still have been worth it".

=== Chief of Staff ===
==== 1914 ====
Falkenhayn succeeded Helmuth von Moltke the Younger, who was considered mentally unstable, as Chief of the Oberste Heeresleitung (the German General Staff) on 14 September 1914. Falkenhayn was 53 years old, making him the youngest man to become chief of staff. Falkenhayn continued in office as minister of war for another five months. Falkenhayn recommended Adolf Wild von Hohenborn as the new war minister; the Kaiser agreed with his recommendation, making Hohenborn the next war minister. Falkenhayn moved OHL to Mézières, to put OHL at the centre of the right wing of the German armies in the west and ordered the southern armies to dig in, part of the beginning of trench warfare. The responsibility of Falkenhayn increased when the Kaiser failed to decide a grand strategy. Falkenhayn did not want diplomatic interference in the course of war. For the first few weeks, lack of success led to widespread criticism. Falkenhayn recognized the pending failure of the Schlieffen-Moltke Plan and attempted to outflank the British and French in the Race to the Sea, a series of meeting engagements in northern France and Belgium, in which each side made reciprocal attempts to turn the other's flank, until they reached the North Sea coast and ran out of room for manoeuvre.

In November 1914, Falkenhayn acknowledged that Germany would not be able to gain a decisive victory. He advocated a mild peace with the Russian Empire to Bethmann Hollweg, the better to concentrate against the French and British. Neither Bethmann Hollweg nor the generals on the Eastern Front, such as Paul von Hindenburg, Erich Ludendorff or Max Hoffmann, supported the idea since they believed that negotiation with the Russian Empire was impossible. While Helmuth von Moltke the Younger and Hindenburg were highly critical of Falkenhayn and sought to have him dismissed, the Emperor continued to support him. Falkenhayn did not perceive the need to deploy troops on the Vistula, he favoured sending troops to East Prussia, where the Russians took advantage of the weakening 8th Army.

==== 1915 ====
A Breakthrough Army (Durchbruchsarmee) for an offensive down the Somme river valley, consisting of nine new divisions, was formed in the first quarter of 1915 but three divisions were not ready in time. The new army was transferred to the Eastern Front and was renamed the 11th Army. The army had success during the Second Battle of the Masurian Lakes but raising divisions was difficult because of the shortage of junior officers and equipment.

Falkenhayn found that the Die Fliegertruppen des deutschen Kaiserreiches (Imperial German Flying Corps, Die Fliegertruppe), needed to be expanded. Falkenhayn noticed that the scepticism of the Ministry of War to airships, was justified. He tried to use the airships and develop rapidly the air force. Wild von Hohenborn was appointed minister of war and on 20 January 1915, Falkenhayn was promoted to General der Infanterie. As the chief of staff, Falkenhayn had many enemies because of his strategic thinking but he had Franz Conrad von Hötzendorf, chief of staff of the Austro-Hungarian Army, as his uneasy ally. They differed on war aims; Hötzendorf wanting a war against Russia, Falkenhayn against France. Falkenhayn attempted to keep Italy out of the war but failed. Attacks on the Eastern Front to support the Austrians, such as the Gorlice–Tarnów Offensive, caused the Russians to evacuate Russian Poland and then to retreat deeper into the Russian interior.

On 8 September 1915, Falkenhayn signed a military convention with Conrad von Hötzendorf, which called for an immediate attack on Serbia. In the fall of 1915, Falkenhayn launched an attack against Serbia. Late in the year the favourable situation gave Falkenhayn hope to achieving peace in the east. Falkenhayn preferred to conduct an offensive strategy on the Western Front, while conducting a limited campaign in the east; he hoped that Russia could be persuaded to accept a separate peace. Hindenburg and Ludendorff opposed this policy and wanted the main offensive effort to be in the east. Falkenhayn tried to weaken the French and British with renewed attacks and unrestricted submarine warfare. According to Admiral Reinhard Scheer, Falkenhayn was an advocate of submarine warfare because countering Britain was an important war aim but this was opposed by Bethmann Hollweg.

==== 1916 ====
Falkenhayn conducted a battle of attrition, as claimed in his post-war memoirs, in the Battle of Verdun in early 1916. Falkenhayn argued to the Kaiser that the war would end by causing many casualties to the French Army using methods that limited German losses. Falkenhayn hoped that the French would fight for Verdun, the gateway to France from the east. Verdun offered the Germans the advantages of their artillery firing from three sides into a large salient in the German lines, excellent German communications and Verdun being bisected by the Meuse, which made it difficult for the French to defend. Falkenhayn ordered the Crown Prince to feint in Verdun and annihilate the French armies, which would try to defend the city by sending more troops. Falkenhayn's strategy backfired, the Crown Prince and his chief of staff, Konstantin Schmidt von Knobelsdorf disobeyed the order and tried to seize the city. French artillery on the west back of the Meuse began to inflict many casualties on the 5th Army. Because more than a quarter of a million soldiers during the battle eventually died, Falkenhayn was sometimes called "the Blood-Miller of Verdun". Contrary to Falkenhayn's expectations, the French were able to limit casualties in the divisions sent to Verdun, General Philippe Pétain kept the divisions in front of Verdun until casualties reached 50 per cent of the infantry, and then relieved them. The procession of divisions back and forth was analogous to the operation of a "noria", a type of water-wheel that continuously lifts water and empties it into a trough.

=== Supersession ===
On 27 August 1916 Falkenhayn received news that the Kingdom of Romania had declared war on Austria-Hungary. After the relative failure at Verdun, coupled with reverses on the Eastern Front (the Brusilov Offensive and the entry of Romania into the war), the beginning of the Anglo-French offensive on the Somme and the intrigues of Hindenburg and Ludendorff, Falkenhayn was replaced as chief of staff by Hindenburg on 29 August 1916.

=== Romania (1916–1917) ===
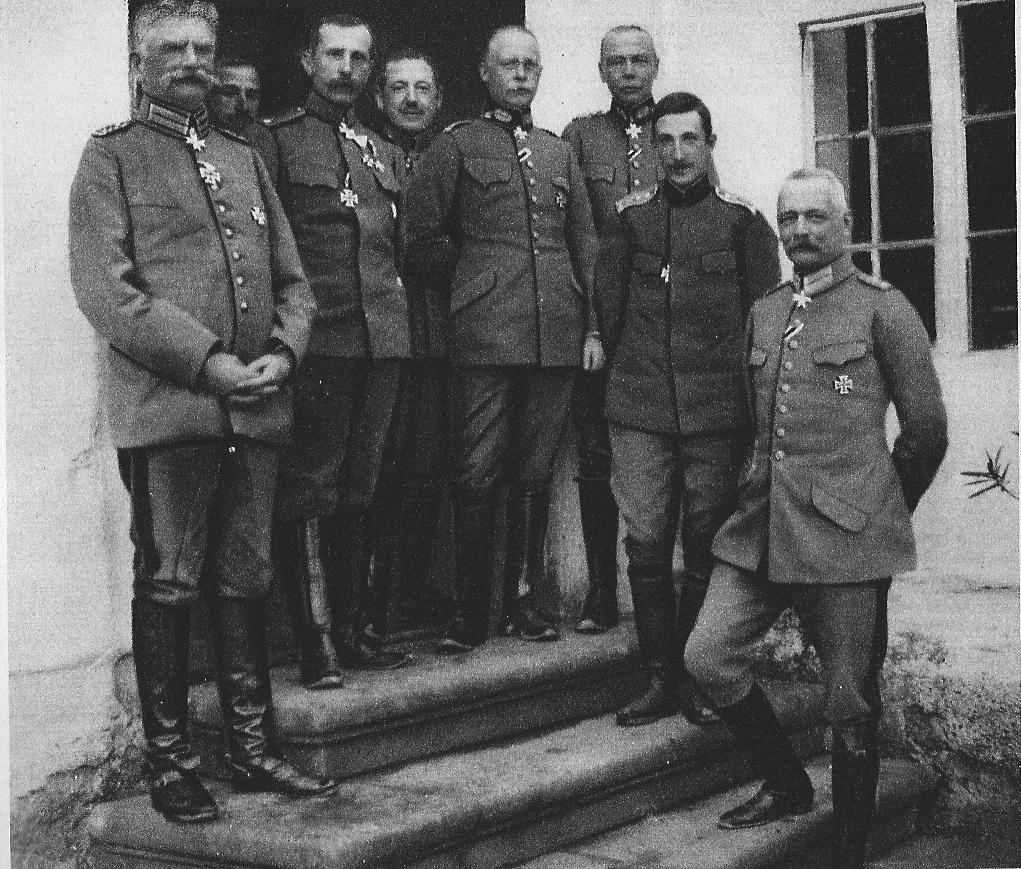
Falkenhayn in Romania in November 1916

Falkenhayn assumed command of the 9th Army in Transylvania (6 September 1916) and in August launched a joint offensive against Romania with August von Mackensen who attacked from Bulgaria, through the Dobruja. As the commander of the 9th Army, Falkenhayn settled his army in Brașov and deceived the Romanians into believing that there would be no offensives in western Romania. The 9th Army fought the Romanian First Army in Hațeg. After the battle, Falkenhayn joined with Austrian forces to surround the Romanian forces. Falkenhayn delayed the offensive against Romanian forces and as a result came into conflict with Archduke Karl of Austria, who would later become Charles I of Austria. He justified the postponement by pointing to the bad conditions of roads. Even with the conflict with the Austrian Army, in late 1916 and early 1917, Falkenhayn and Mackensen were able to drive the Romanian forces into Russia.

=== Palestine (1917–1918) ===
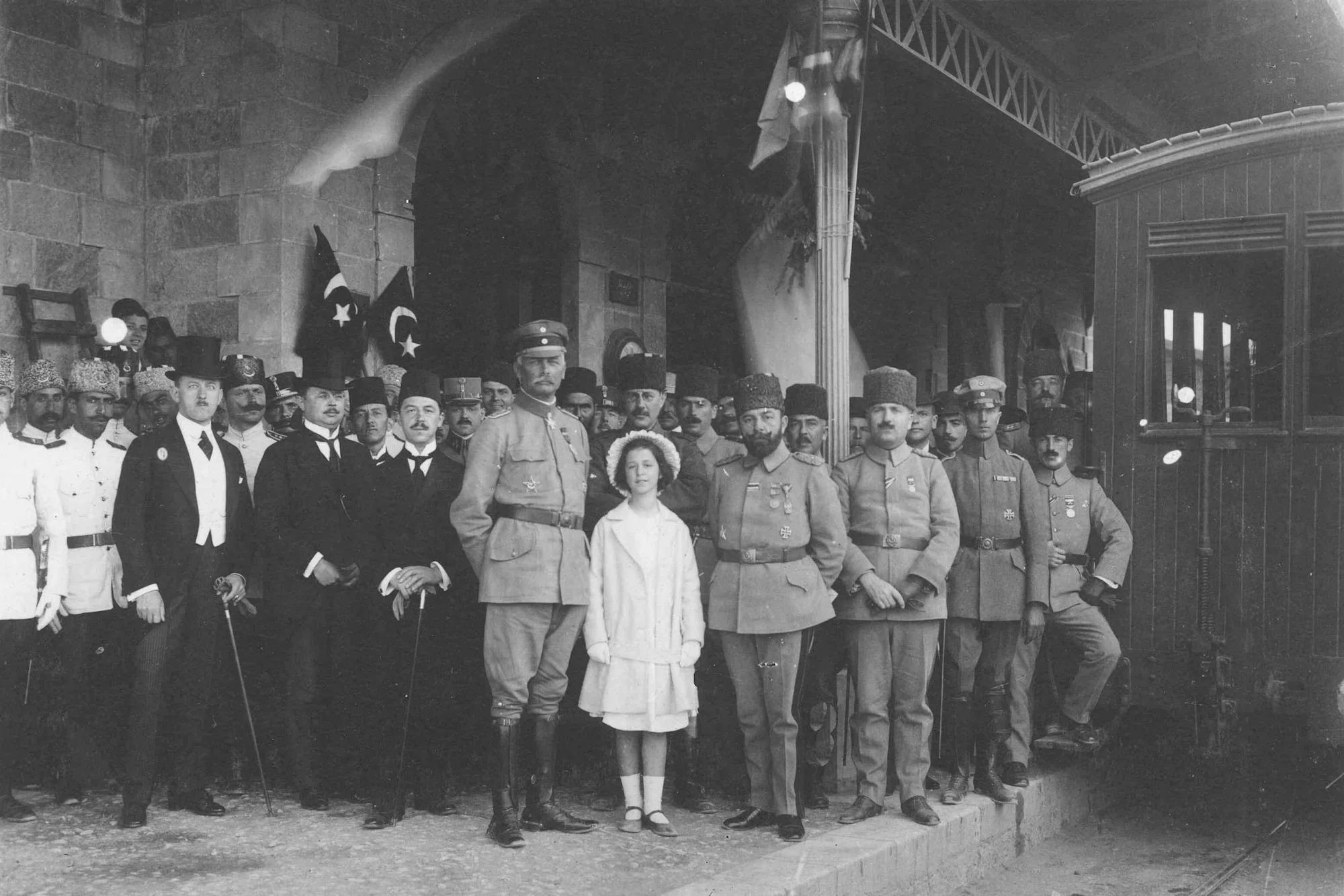
Falkenhayn with his daughter Erika and other Ottoman Pashas (Cemal Pasha, Fuad Bey and Abdulkerim Pasha) and consuls (such as Henrik Bródy) at the Jerusalem (Palestine) train station in 1917

Following his success at Brașov, Romania in mid-July 1917, Falkenhayn went to take over the Ottoman Yildirim Army Group (Heeresgruppe F [Army Group F]), which was being formed in Mesopotamia and at Aleppo. After discussions with the Ottoman general staff, Falkenhayn was made supreme commander of two Ottoman armies in Palestine, with the rank of Mushir (field marshal) of the Ottoman Army. In the Sinai and Palestine Campaign, Falkenhayn failed to prevent the conquest of Jerusalem by the Egyptian Expeditionary Force in December 1917 and was replaced by Otto Liman von Sanders.

Falkenhayn is credited with avoiding a battle for the Old City of Jerusalem with its many holy sites, as well as with a crucial role in stopping the forced removal of the Jewish population of Palestine, which Governor Djemal Pasha had planned along the lines of the Armenian genocide. The evacuation of the population of Jerusalem during the harsh winter months had also been planned by Djemal Pasha and was thwarted by German officers including Falkenhayn.

=== Belarus (1918–1919) ===
In February 1918, Falkenhayn was made commander of the 10th Army in Belarus. The army carried out the occupation tasks in Belarus after Treaty of Brest-Litovsk. As an Army commander, he witnessed the end of the war in Belarus. In December 1918 he oversaw the withdrawal of the 10th Army to Germany. The formation disbanded in February 1919 and Falkenhayn retired from the army following the dissolution of his army.

== Retirement ==
In 1919, Falkenhayn retired from the army and withdrew to his estate, where he wrote his autobiography and several books on war and strategy. His war memoirs were translated into English as The German General Staff and Its Critical Decisions, 1914–1916 (1919). With the benefit of hindsight, he remarked that the German declarations of war on Russia and France in 1914 were "justifiable but overly-hasty and unnecessary". Falkenhayn died in 1922, at Schloss Lindstedt, near Potsdam and was buried in Potsdam.

== Personal life ==
In 1886, Falkenhayn married Ida Selkmann (1866–1964), with whom he had a son, Fritz Georg Adalbert von Falkenhayn (1890–1973) and a daughter, Erika Karola Olga von Falkenhayn (1904–1974) who married Henning von Tresckow (1901–1944) a general who participated in the 20 July plot to assassinate Hitler.

== Assessment ==
Falkenhayn in many ways typified the Prussian generals; a militarist in the literal sense, he had undeniable political and military competence and showed contempt for democracy and the representative Reichstag. He addressed the Reichstag in 1914, saying, "Only through the fact that the Prussian army is removed by the constitution from the party struggle and the influence of ambitious party leaders has it become what it is: the secure defence of peace at home and abroad". Militarily, Falkenhayn had a mixed record. His offensive at Verdun proved a strategic failure. During the campaign against Romania in 1916 Falkenhayn demonstrated considerable skill in command of the 9th Army, driving the Romanians from Transylvania, breaking through the Southern Carpathians and forcing the shattered Romanian forces north-east into Moldavia.

Winston Churchill considered him to be the ablest of the German generals in World War I. Trevor Dupuy also ranked him near the top of the German commanders, just below Hindenburg and Ludendorff. Robert Foley wrote that Germany's enemies were far more able to apply a strategy of attrition, because they had greater amounts of manpower, industry and economic control over the world, resorting to many of the methods used by Falkenhayn in Russia in 1915 and France in 1916. As the cost of fighting the war increased, the war aims of the Entente expanded, to include the overthrow of the political elites of the Central Powers and the ability to dictate peace to a comprehensively defeated enemy, which was achieved by a strategy of attrition.

During his term as the Chief of the General Staff, one staff officer wrote that Falkenhayn had lacked decisiveness and foresight in the matters of organization and tactics. All sources portray Falkenhayn as a loyal, honest and punctilious friend and superior. His positive legacy is his conduct during the war in Palestine in 1917. As his biographer Holger Afflerbach wrote, "An inhuman excess against the Jews in Palestine was prevented only by Falkenhayn's conduct, which against the background of the German history of the 20th century has a special meaning, and one that distinguishes Falkenhayn".

== Honours ==
He received the following decorations and awards:

- Kingdom of Prussia:
  - Knight of the Red Eagle, 1st Class
  - Knight of the Royal Crown Order, 2nd Class
  - Service Award Cross
  - Iron Cross (1914), 1st and 2nd Classes
  - Pour le Merite (military) 16 February 1915; with Oak Leaves, 3 June 1915
  - Knight of the Black Eagle, 12 May 1915
- Brunswick: Order of Henry the Lion, Commander Second Class, 1906
- Baden: Order of the Zähringer Lion, Commander Second Class, 1907
- Kingdom of Bavaria:
  - Grand Cross of the Military Merit Order, with Swords
  - Grand Cross of the Military Order of Max Joseph, 26 June 1915
- (Saxe-Coburg and Gotha) (Duchy of Saxe-Altenburg) (Saxe-Meiningen) Ernestine duchies: Knight of the Saxe-Ernestine House Order, 1st Class
- Kingdom of Saxony:
  - Commander of the Albert Order, 1st Class with Swords
  - Knight of the Military Order of St. Henry
- Schaumburg-Lippe: Cross of Honour of the House Order of Schaumburg-Lippe, 2nd Class
- Ottoman Empire:
  - Golden Liakat Medal
  - Golden Imtiyaz Medal
  - First Class Knight Order of the Medjidie
- (Austrian Empire) (Kingdom of Hungary) Austria-Hungary:
  - Grand Cross of the Imperial Order of Leopold, 1914
  - Grand Cross of the Royal Hungarian Order of St. Stephen, 1915
  - Gold Military Merit Medal "Signum Laudis", 11 October 1916
- Empire of Japan:
  - Order of the Rising Sun, 4th Class
  - Order of the Sacred Treasure, 2nd Class
- Qing dynasty: Order of the Double Dragon, Class II Grade II

== See also ==
- Douaumont Ossuary Verdun

== Footnotes ==
Political offices
Preceded by Josias von Heeringen	Prussian Minister of War; 1913–1915	Succeeded by Adolf Wild von Hohenborn
Military offices
Preceded by Helmuth von Moltke	Chief of the General Staff; 1914–1916	Succeeded by Paul von Hindenburg
Preceded by New Formation	Commander, 9th Army; 6 September 1916 – 1 May 1917	Succeeded by General der Infanterie Robert Kosch
Preceded by New Formation	Commander, Ottoman Army Group F 20 July 1917 – 6 February 1918	Succeeded by General der Kavallerie Otto Liman von Sanders
Preceded by Generalfeldmarschall Hermann von Eichhorn	Commander, 10th Army; 5 March 1918 – 6 January 1919	Succeeded by Dissolved
