= Remus von Woyrsch =

German field marshal (1847–1920)

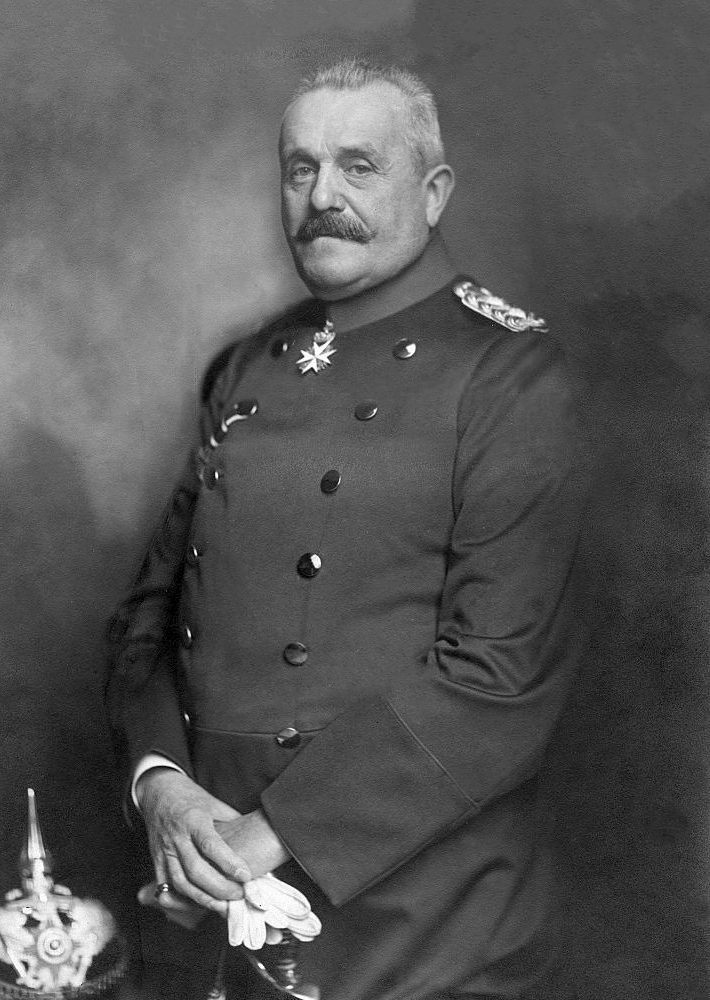
- Woyrsch in 1915
- Born: 4 February 1847; Pilsnitz, Landkreis Breslau, Province of Silesia, Kingdom of Prussia, German Confederation
- Died: 6 August 1920 (aged 73); Pilsnitz, Landkreis Breslau, Province of Lower Silesia, Weimar Republic
- Relatives: Udo von Woyrsch
- Military career
- Allegiance: German Empire; Kingdom of Prussia; Weimar Republic
- Branch: Imperial German Army; Prussian Army; Reichswehr
- Service years: 1866–1911; 1914–1920
- Rank: Generalfeldmarschall
- Commands: Landwehr Corps; Armee-Abteilung Woyrsch; Army Group Woyrsch
- Conflicts: Austro-Prussian War; Franco-Prussian War; World War I
- Awards: Pour le Mérite; Order of Saint John

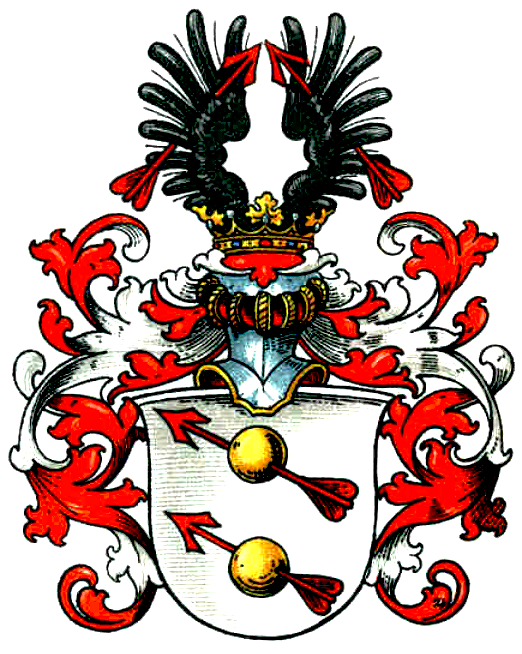
Coat of arms of the ancient Woyrsch family

Martin Wilhelm Remus von Woyrsch (4 February 1847 – 6 August 1920) was a Prussian field marshal, a member of the Prussian House of Lords from 1908 to 1918, and an Ehrenkommendator or Honorary Commander of the Order of St. John.

== Family ==
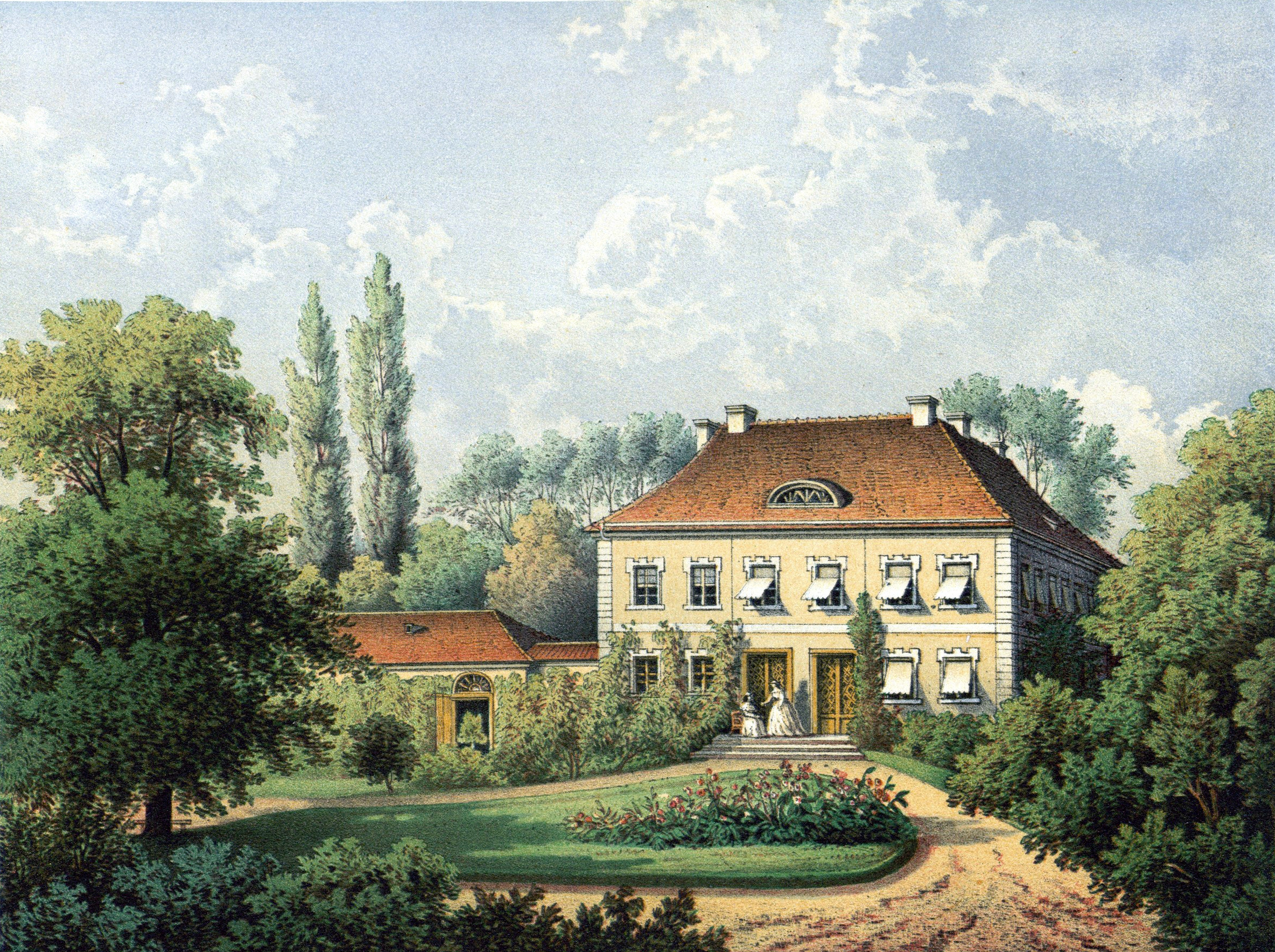
House Pilsnitz around 1860, edition by Alexander Duncker

Remus von Woyrsch was born at the estate Pilsnitz (Pilczyce) near Breslau (Wrocław) in Prussian Silesia. He came from old Bohemian nobility, first from South Bohemia and then from ca. 1500 in Troppau (Opava) in Moravian Silesia. He married Thekla von Massow (1854–1943) from East Prussia, on 26 September 1873 in Potsdam, Brandenburg. She was the daughter of the royal Prussian forester Hermann von Massow.

His nephew Udo von Woyrsch (1895–1983) was an SS Obergruppenführer and SS and Police Leader.

== Career ==
After Woyrsch finished high school in Breslau, he joined the 1st Potsdamer Garde-Grenadier Regiment on 5 April 1866. He served at the battle of Königgrätz in 1866. He later fought in the 1870–71 Franco-Prussian War where he was wounded but earned the Iron Cross. In 1901 Woyrsch was promoted to divisional commander.

He retired in 1911 but was re-activated in August 1914 to command the Landwehr Corps and was quickly sent to help the Austro-Hungarian Army fighting in partitioned Poland. He came up to the Vistula, and then reinforced the left wing of the Austro-Hungarian army under General Viktor Dankl von Krasnik. In the three days of battle against the Imperial Russian army Woyrsch covered the retreat of the Austrians with his Landwehr corps. A St. Petersburg newspaper wrote that: "Only the activity of the small Prussian Landwehr troops in this battle prevented the complete destruction of the Austrian army." Later he was included in Paul von Hindenburg's 9th Army. In July 1915 Woyrsch was involved in the breakthrough battle of Sienno near Wongrowitz (Wągrowiec). In 1916 he helped fight off the Russian Brusilov Offensive and in 1917 was promoted Generalfeldmarschall.

In 1920 Woyrsch retired, again, to his family estate at the castle Pilsnitz near Breslau. After his death the Silesian sculptor Paul Ondrusch created a wooden sculpture of Woyrsch to decorate the main hall inside the town hall of Leobschütz (Głubczyce). Woyrsch was portrayed as a knight wearing a coat and a chain mail, with his hands placed on a handle of a large sword resting against the ground.

== Honours ==
- Ehrenbürger (Honorary citizen) of Breslau
- Ehrenbürger (Honorary citizen) of Neisse
- Honorary doctorate from the Faculty of Philosophy

== Orders and decorations ==
- Iron Cross (1871)
- Order of the Black Eagle 02.02.1911 with Collar
- Order of Saint John (Johanniterorden)
- Pour le Mérite on 25 October 1914

Military offices
Preceded by New Formation	Commander, Landwehr Corps; 2 August 1914 – 23 September 1916	Succeeded by General der Infanterie Günther Graf von Kirchbach
Preceded by New Formation	Commander, Armee-Abteilung Woyrsch; 14 October 1914 – 15 December 1917	Succeeded by Dissolved
Preceded by Renamed from Heeresgruppe Leopold	Commander, Heeresgruppe Woyrsch; 29 August 1916 – 15 December 1917	Succeeded by Dissolved
