= Armee-Abteilung Woyrsch =

Armee-Abteilung Woyrsch Army Detachment "Woyrsch"
- Flag of the Staff of an Armee Oberkommando (1871–1918)
- Active: 3 November 1914 – 15 December 1917
- Country: German Empire
- Type: Army
- Engagements: World War I

Armee-Abteilung Woyrsch (Army Detachment "Woyrsch") was an army level command of the German Army in World War I. It served on the Eastern Front throughout its existence.

== History ==
Armee-Abteilung Woyrsch was formed on 3 November 1914 under the command of Generaloberst Remus von Woyrsch. It was dissolved on 15 December 1917.

== Commanders ==
Armee-Abteilung Woyrsch was commanded throughout its existence by Generaloberst (later Generalfeldmarschall) Remus von Woyrsch. Woyrsch was the commander of the Landwehr Corps, an appointment he retained concurrently until 20 September 1916. A deputy, Generalleutnant Götz Freiherr von König, took command of Landwehr Corps on 3 December 1914. On 29 August 1916, Woyrsch also took over command of Heeresgruppe Leopold from Generalfeldmarschall Prince Leopold of Bavaria and the command was renamed Heeresgruppe Woyrsch.

== Glossary ==
- Armee-Abteilung or Army Detachment in the sense of "something detached from an Army". It is not under the command of an Army so is in itself a small Army.
- Armee-Gruppe or Army Group in the sense of a group within an Army and under its command, generally formed as a temporary measure for a specific task.
- Heeresgruppe or Army Group in the sense of a number of armies under a single commander.

== See also ==
- Landwehr Corps

== Bibliography ==
- Cron, Hermann (2002). Imperial German Army 1914–18: Organisation, Structure, Orders-of-Battle [first published: 1937]. Helion & Co. ISBN 1-874622-70-1.
