= Romania–Russia relations =

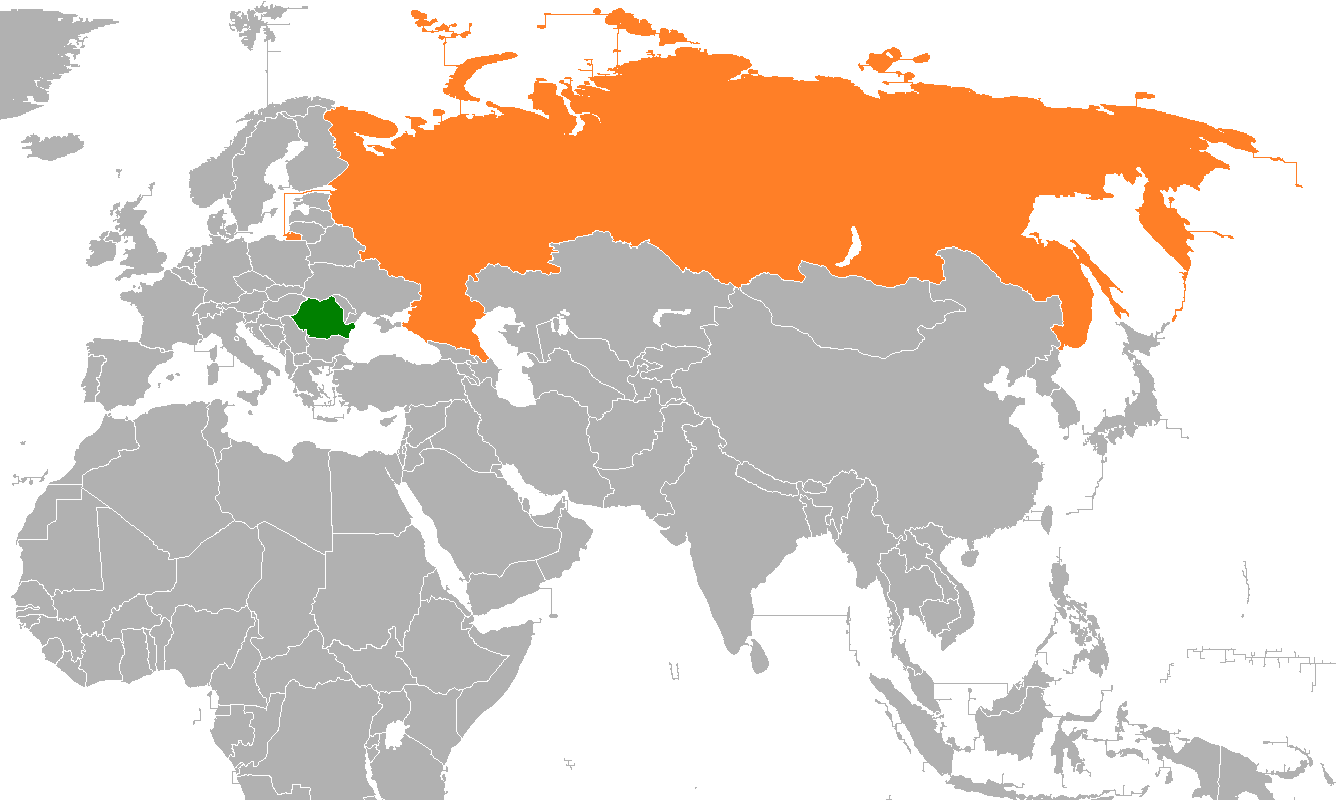
- Romania: Russia

Diplomatic mission
- Embassy of Romania, Moscow: Embassy of Russia, Bucharest

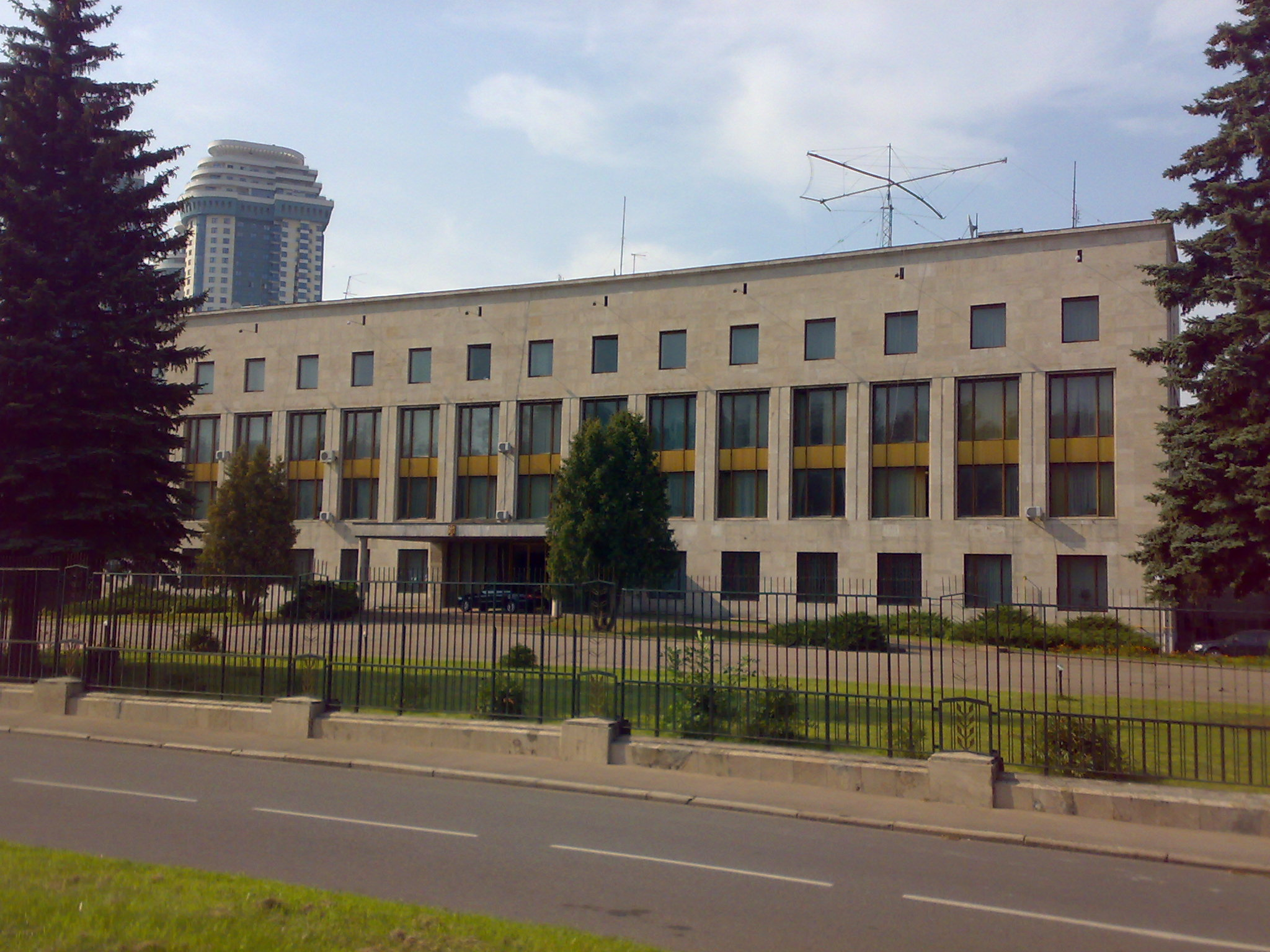
Embassy of Romania in Moscow

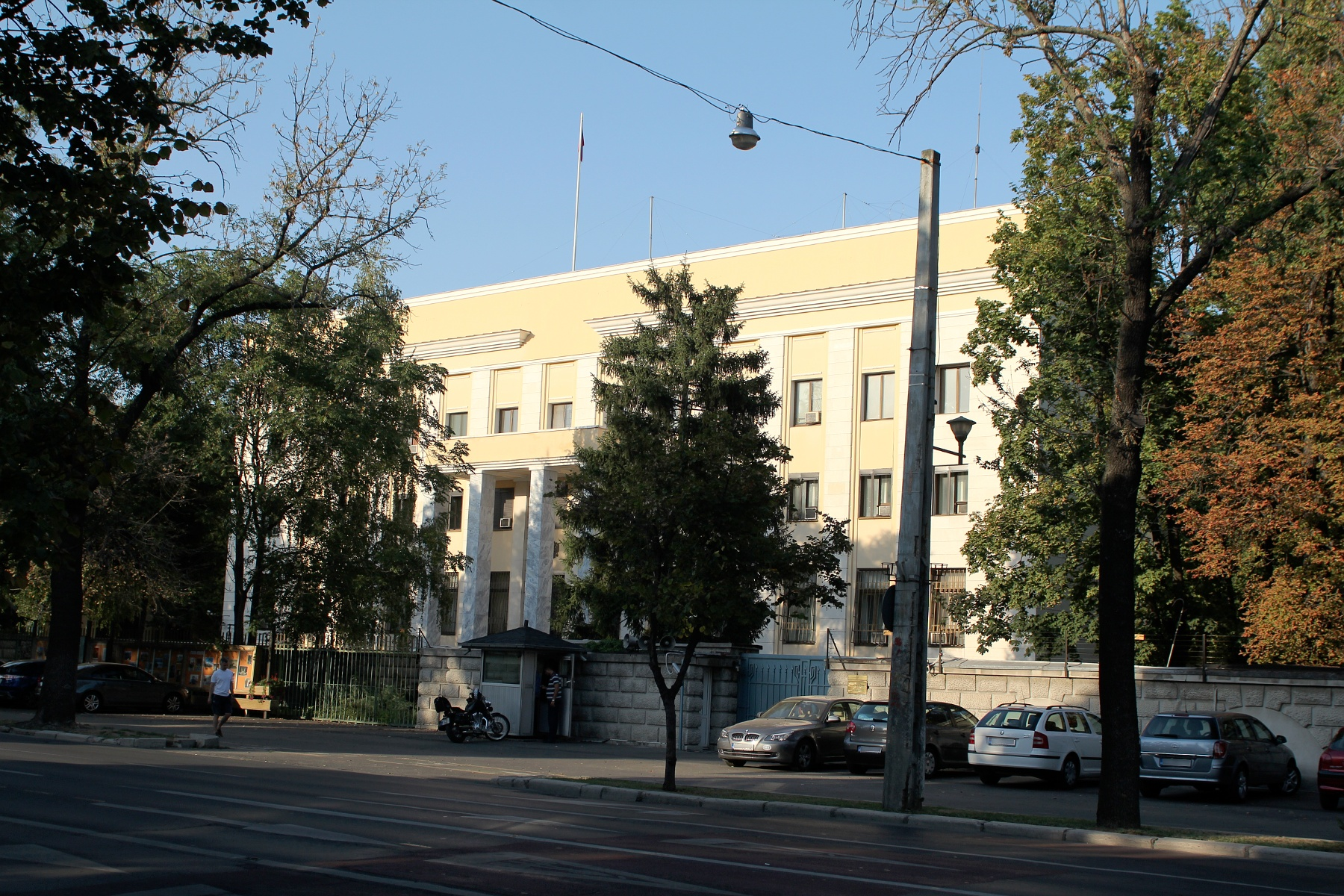
Embassy of Russia in Bucharest

Romania–Russia relations are the foreign relations between Romania and Russia. Romania has an embassy in Moscow. Russia has an embassy in Bucharest. Historical relations have oscillated among grudging cooperation, neutrality, open hatred and hostility.

Both countries refused to recognize Kosovo's declaration of independence from Serbia and strongly supported its territorial integrity. About 30,000 Russians live in Romania, mainly in the Tulcea County (see Lipovans). About 5,308 Romanians live in Russia, mainly in the Russian Far East. Both countries were full members of the Council of Europe and the Organization for Security and Co-operation in Europe, until Russia was suspended from the former in 2022.

In 1992 and 1993, relations between the two were especially strained when they backed opposite sides in the Transnistria conflict. Romania is part of NATO, which Russia views in a highly negative light. Debates over the status of Transnistria maintain antagonism between Romanians and Russians. Furthermore, according to The Balkans: Nationalism, War, and the Great Powers, 1804–1999 by Misha Glenny, dislike of Russia and Russians is deeply integrated into Romanian culture since the end of the 19th century due to chronic quarrels between the two countries, and has been for most of the modern era.

Russian opinion on Romania is highly mixed and varied according to the geo-political considerations at one given time, ranging from indifference, sometimes to slight esteem, at times deep frustration and even profound disconsideration. The slight esteem derived from common grounds reached between the two sides at various times, a common Christian Orthodox faith and some common cultural values. Deep frustration and even profound disconsideration remained nevertheless the predominant Russian reaction when both sides were locked into geopolitical struggles.

As one primary Russian geopolitical objective has been expansion of its influence into the Balkan Peninsula the two sides became more often adversaries than partners.

== History ==
=== 18th and early 19th centuries. Russian Protectorate ===
The relationship between the two countries started during the 15th century, when a Moldavian prince, Stephen the Great, married his daughter to the Tsar's son. In 1712, another Moldavian prince, Dimitrie Cantemir allied with Peter the Great to gain independence from the Ottoman Empire. He became one of Peter's courtiers.

Russian-Romanian relations were generally cordial until the end of the 18th century when Russia was helping Wallachia and Moldavia, two principalities that would later join to create Romania, free themselves of Ottoman domination. Russia's role as a spiritual "guardian" for the Ottoman Empire's Orthodox Christian subjects was affirmed in the 1774 Treaty of Kuchuk Kainardji, and Russia soon after gained a border with the Ottoman Empire right next to the principalities. The "Danubian Principalities" were then semi-autonomous, ruled by Greek Phanariot hospodars, whom the Romanians (both the boyars and the peasantry) widely resented.

=== 1848 to 1853 ===
Russia's actions caused a multiplication of anti-Russian sentiment throughout the Principalities, for each group having a different reason. The urban elite (the later Liberals) were frustrated by Russia's opposition to reform in Romania; while landowning boyars (the later Conservatives) were frustrated by Russia's impediments on the economy. Romania was flooded with French literary works transmitting Enlightenment ideas, and due to the similarity of Romanian and French, these had a much faster effect on Romania than other areas. Hence, from a very early time, there was competition between France and Russia for Romania's affinities, even though Russia was the only one of the two to have any real immediate significance to Romania. These feelings provided only strengthened the anti-Russian sentiment in Romania.

During the Revolutions of 1848, Romanians for the first time revolted against Russia, and the Russian flag and the Organic Declarations were burned in public. Romania in fact wooed the Porte, which had to be "persuaded" by Russia not to aid the Romanians.

In July 1853, Russia invaded and occupied Romania. Russian occupation was harsh and all political organizations were suppressed. When the Porte declared war on Russia in October of that year, Romanians hoped desperately that Russia would be driven from their country (ironically by the country which they had just recently separated from). This wish was granted by the coalition of both Turkey and Austria against Russia.

=== Support for the 1866 Moldavian separatist uprising ===
Imperial Russia supported the April 3, 1866 Moldavian separatist uprising in Iași. Disillusioned by the unification of the Romanian principalities and the centralism in Bucharest, several Moldovan boyars and clerics, with Russian support, tried to separate Moldova from Wallachia and practically break the newly formed Romanian state. The Russian press published articles about the "Moldovans' struggle against the Wallachian Romanians".

=== Romanian independence ===
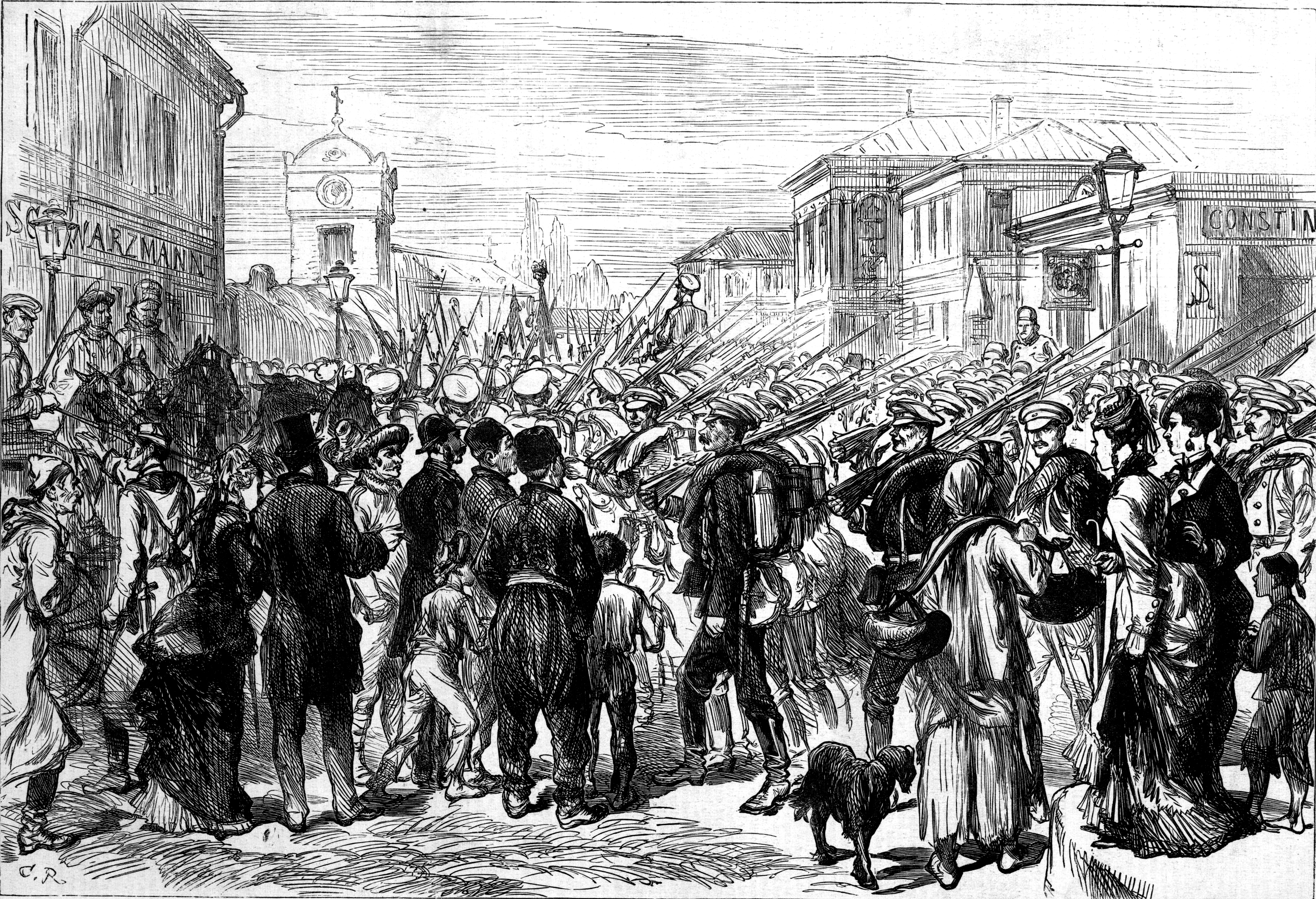
The Russian Army in Bucharest in 1877

Romania's independence from the Ottoman Empire was achieved mainly with Russian assistance, although during the Russo-Turkish War of 1877 the Russians requested military assistance from Romania during the Siege of Plevna, after suffering heavy losses.

=== 1877 to World War I ===
Fear of Russian encroachment in the Balkans drove the Romanians in 1883 into a secret pact with Vienna. The king, Prime Minister Ioan Bratianu, Foreign Minister D. A. Sturdza, and Romanian Minister to Vienna P. P. Carp supported Romania's orientation toward the Central Powers. In addition there was economic competition with Russia. From very early on, however, Romanian economic competition with Russia throttled good relations. Romania is a natural economic rival of Russia (on the eve of World War II, in fact, it was the world's fourth largest food exporter, after Russia, Canada and the United States). Balkans expert Misha Glenny explains Russia's historical attitude towards Romania as such:

...Russia saw wheat cultivation in Romania as a threat to its own harvests in southern Russia, much of it sold on to Britain and France. If the Principalities were able to modernize the port facilities on the Danube and the Black Sea, they could begin to undercut the price of Russian wheat on world markets. To throttle this competition, Russia exploited its position as protector of the Principalities by allowing the mouth of the Danube to silt up. Russia's interest in the Principalities was essentially strategic. St. Petersburg wanted a pliant satellite, not an economic competitor.

Russia's expansionist designs in the Balkan Peninsula with its conclusive geo-political objective the capture of the strait of Bosphorus and Dardanelles convinced Romania that Russia has no good faith, and forced Romania to look for support somewhere else. Russia's aggressiveness, its projects for territorial conquests was being executed under the policy of Pan-Slavism. Bratianu denounced the danger of the Pan-Slavic idea for the entire Europe. There, on the shores of Bosphorus and Dardanelles, was the key to Europe. Romanian Prime Minister Take Ionescu concludes: "All the efforts made by the empire, all its aspirations, all the Russian impetus are heading towards that point". The Russian conquests in this region would have threatened Romania's existence itself. "We cannot talk about agreements, compromises and concessions. If we still exist, Russia will experience a failure in its plans which have animated the heart of the Russians, for two centuries. If the neighbouring empire succeeds in accomplishing the dream it has pursued with so much confidence and tenacity, the Romanian state and people will become just a memory. This is the truth."

Between 1885 and 1913, Romania and Russia found themselves in two systems of opposed alliances, since both had divergent interests in the Balkan area. Russia's efforts to expand its influence in the Balkans met with the Austro-Hungarian resistance. Since Russia's claims in the Balkans were sustained in most cases by France and Great Britain, and the Austro-Hungarian claims were sustained by Germany, the Balkan Peninsula was about to face the strong political pressures from both side. During the Balkan crisis of 1885–1886 there were marked Russian-Romanian divergences because the Romanian diplomacy supported the election of Ferdinand of Saxe-Coburg at the Bulgarian throne, the candidate backed by Austria-Hungary.

In order to improve relations, St. Nicholas Russian Church (Romanian: Biserica Rusă) was started in central Bucharest in 1905, initiated by Russian Ambassador Mikhail Nikolaevich Giers. The Court of Emperor Nicholas II provided the funds needed for the building (600,000 gold rubles). The structure occupies a surface of 350 m^{2} and it was set in brick and stone. The seven domes (taking the shape of onion domes — characteristic of Russia, but unusual in Romania) were initially covered in gold. The iconostasis was carved in wood and then covered in gold, following the model of Church of the Twelve Apostles in the Moscow Kremlin. The church was finished in 1909, and it was sanctified on November 25, 1909.

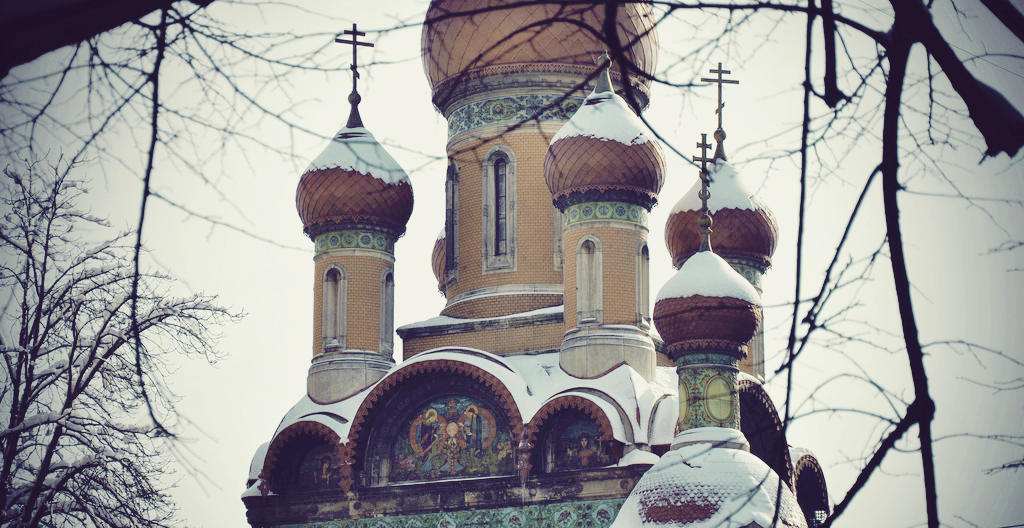
St. Nicholas Russian Church (Romanian: Biserica Rusă). Building initiated by Russian ambassador Mikhail Nikolaevich Giers in 1905

Romania was frustrated with the Triple Alliance and after 1900 moved closer to Russia. Its main goal was to obtain Transylvania, which was part of the Austro-Hungarian empire that was part of the Triple Alliance. that Empire in turn was supported by Germany. Romania therefore was pulled toward the Russian orbit especially during the Balkan Wars of 1912–1913 the Russians appreciated their entry into the Balkans. High-level royal visits were exchanged. In 1914, however, Romania remained neutral at first, finally joining with Russia, France and Britain in 1916.

=== World War I (1916–1918) ===
When the war began Romania declared neutrality, but began secret negotiations with Russia and Britain whereby they would recognize Romanian acquisition of Transylvania. Nevertheless, for nearly 2 years Romania remained officially neutral, and traded with Austria and Germany. Sensing the imminent success of the Brusilov campaign in the summer of 1916, Bucharest decided the time was ripe to officially join the Allies. It launched an attack on the Austro-Hungarian Empire in August. Fighting took place from August 1916 to December 1917, across most of present-day Romania, including Transylvania, as well as southern Dobruja, which is currently part of Bulgaria. It ended with the occupation of most of Romania by the Central Powers.

In 1916–1917, the Romanian government signed a deal with the Russian government which stated that Russia would safe keep the Romanian Treasure in the Kremlin until the end of the war. In early 1918, after the Romanian military intervention in Bessarabia, the new Bolshevik government severed all diplomatic relations and confiscated the Romanian treasure. All the governments of Romania since World War I have tried unsuccessfully to negotiate a return of the gold, but all Soviet and Russian governments have refused.

=== Interbellum ===
During the interwar period, the Soviet-Romanian relations were marked by the Bessarabian question, as the Soviet Union refused to recognize Romania's acquisition of Bessarabia.

=== World War II ===
On 22 June 1941, German armies with Romanian support attacked the Soviet Union. German and Romanian units conquered Bessarabia, Odessa, and Crimea, then marched eastward across the Russian steppes toward Stalingrad. Romania mustered more combat troops for the Nazi war effort than all of Germany's other allies combined. Adolf Hitler rewarded Romania's loyalty by returning Bessarabia and northern Bukovina and by allowing Romania to annex Soviet lands immediately east of the Dniester, including Odessa. Romanian jingoes in Odessa even distributed a geography showing that the Dacians had inhabited most of southern Russia.

After the tide of war turned against the Axis Powers, Romania was invaded by advancing Soviet armies in 1944. King Michael of Romania led a coup d'état that deposed the Antonescu regime and put Romania on the side of the Soviet Union for the remainder of the war. Despite this late association with the winning side, Greater Romania was largely dismantled, losing territory to Bulgaria and the Soviet Union.

=== Romania–Soviet Union relations (1945/47–1990) ===
Romania–Soviet Union relations

- Romania: Soviet Union

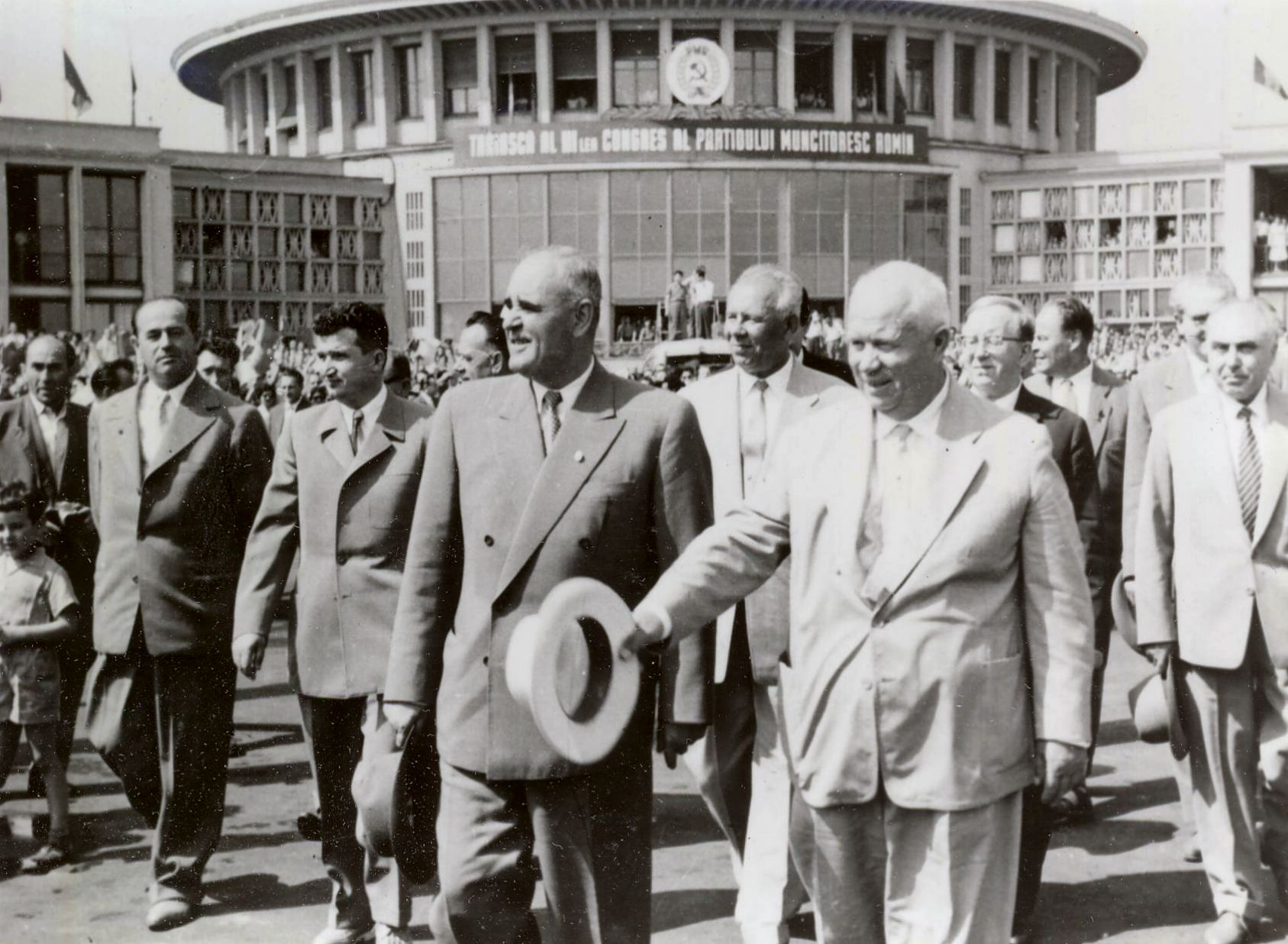
Gheorghe Gheorghiu-Dej (with Nicolae Ceauşescu at his right hand side) and Nikita Khrushchev at Bucharest's Baneasa Airport in June 1960

After coming under communist control in 1948, Romania was closely aligned with the international policies and goals of the Communist Party of the Soviet Union. But after mid-1952, when Gheorghiu-Dej had gained full control of the party and had become head of state, Romania began a slow disengagement from Kremlin domination, being careful not to incur the suspicions or disapproval of Soviet dictator Joseph Stalin. Soviet troops left Romania in 1958, and no Warsaw Pact troops were allowed on Romanian territory after 1962. By that period, the Soviet Union and Romania established SovRoms, which were the new tax-exempt Soviet-Romanian economic corporations that helped the reconstruction of Romania, but also contributed to draining Romania's resources, until they were dismantled in 1956: albeit, some lasted until 1975 with the main focus to assure Soviet access to resources like Uranium.

During the 1968 Warsaw Pact invasion of Czechoslovakia, Romania refused to take part in the operations, and Ceaușescu publicly condemned the actions of the other member states of the pact. The Romanian forces essentially quit participating in joint Warsaw Pact field exercises in the late 1960s. At the same time, Ceaușescu announced that Romania would no longer put the Romanian People's Army under the Warsaw Pact's joint command, even during peacetime maneuvers.

In November 1976, Ceaușescu received Leonid Brezhnev in Bucharest—the first official visit by a Soviet leader since 1955. The final communiqué of the meeting reflected continuing disagreements between the two countries, as Romania refused to side with the Soviets in their dispute with China. In 1978, after visiting China, Ceaușescu attended a Warsaw Pact summit meeting in Moscow, where he rejected a Soviet proposal that member countries increase their military expenditures. On his return to Bucharest, Ceaușescu explained the refusal by stating that any increase in military expenditure was contrary to the socialist countries' effort to reduce military tensions in Europe.

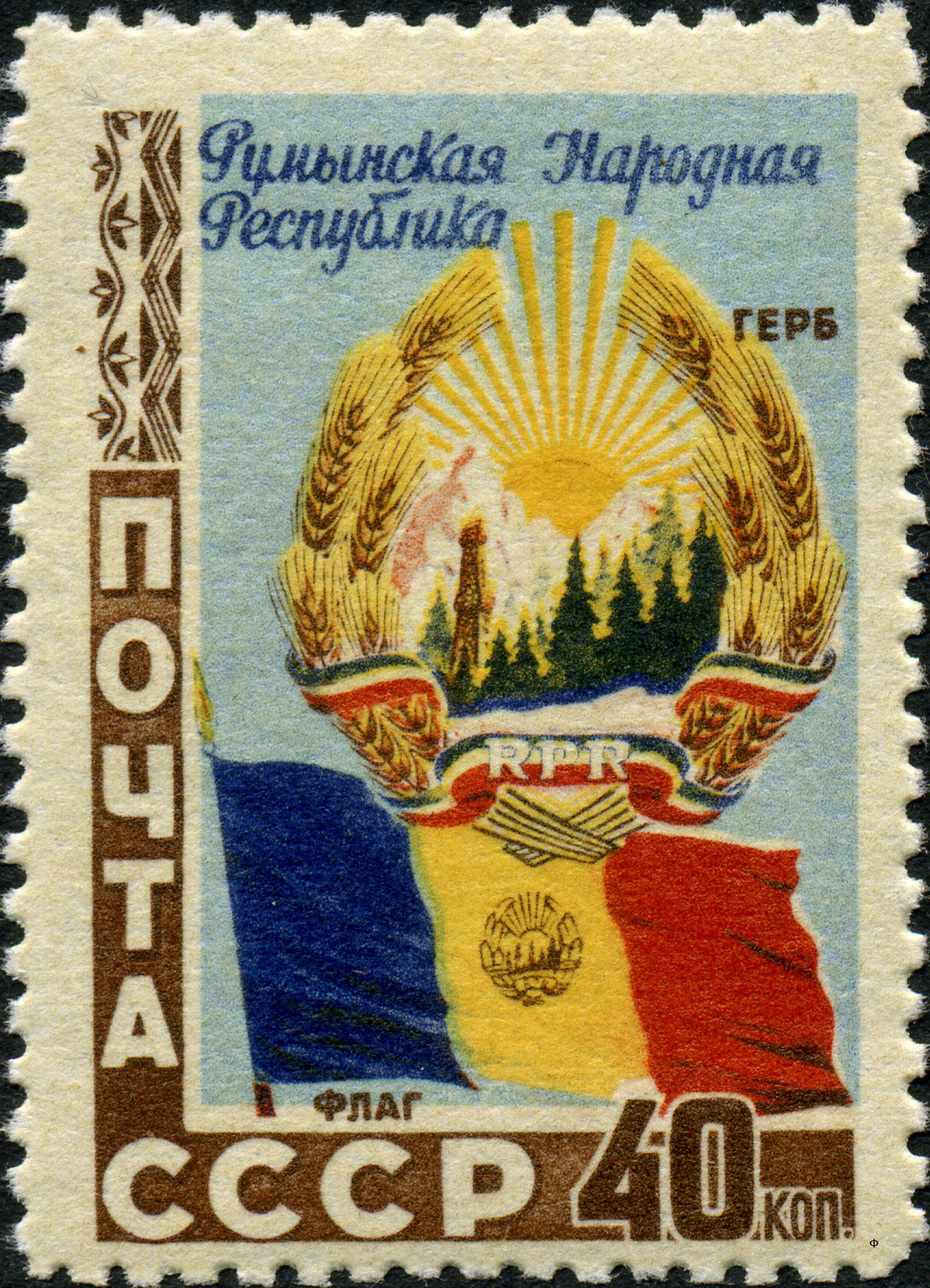
Romanian People's Republic honoured on a 1952 USSR stamp

Perhaps because of Ceaușescu's uncooperative attitude, a 1980 Romanian attempt to secure supplies of energy and raw materials from the Soviet Union and other Comecon countries failed when those countries demanded world market prices and payment in hard currency. Nor would the Soviet Union guarantee that it would increase or even maintain existing levels of oil exports to Romania for the following year.

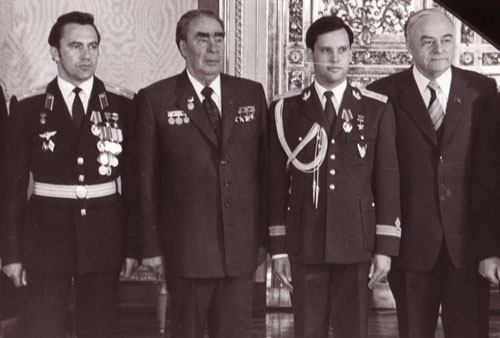
Dumitru Prunariu and Leonid Popov with Leonid Brezhnev in 1981

The Soviet invasion of Afghanistan caused Romania to distance itself further from Brezhnev. When the UN General Assembly voted on a resolution calling for the immediate and unconditional withdrawal of Soviet troops, Romania broke with its Warsaw Pact allies and abstained. And one month later, at a meeting of communist states in Sofia, Romania joined the Democratic People's Republic of Korea (North Korea) in refusing to endorse the invasion.

During Yuri Andropov's brief tenure as Soviet leader, relations remained frigid. The wording of the communiqué following a meeting with Ceausescu in Moscow suggested that Andropov intended to pressure Romania to bring its foreign policy into line with the Warsaw Pact. The Romanian leadership appeared to suspect Andropov of pro-Hungarian sympathies because of his close personal friendship with First Secretary János Kádár of Hungary. Romanian disagreements with the Soviet position on intermediate nuclear forces in Europe also surfaced during the Andropov period.

Romania's relations with the Soviet Union during Gorbachev's Perestroika reforms were tense. According to former Soviet foreign minister Eduard Shevardnadze, Ceaușescu represented "stumbling block to Gorbachev's plans for a new Europe" and he did not even rule out the KGB's involvement in Ceaușescu's overthrow.

=== Romanian relations with the Russian Federation ===
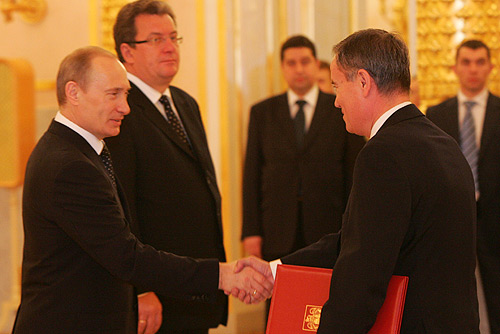
The Ambassador of Romania, Constantin Mihail Grigorie, presenting his credentials to the President of Russia, Vladimir Putin in 2008

Romania's foreign policy after 1990 was built exclusively on geo-strategic reasons and less on economic relations, which has led to minimal relations with Russia. Relations between Romania and Russia became tense shortly after the fall of Communism due to the Transnistria Conflict which began during the dissolution of the Soviet Union. Following the end of the Ceaușescu regime in Romania in December 1989 and the partial opening of the border between Romania and Moldova on 6 May 1990, the possibility of union between the two states, formerly both part of the Kingdom of Romania, began to be considered, but this also led to protests by Russian inhabitants of the Transnistrian enclave, which instead demanded union with Russia, culminating in a brief but bloody war which pitted the Moldovan government against Russian separatists backed by the Russian government with troops, arms and intelligence. Romania for its part provided military support to Moldova by supplying weaponry, ammunition and armed vehicles, and also by sending military advisers and training Moldovan military and police forces. Volunteers from Romania fought on Moldova's side.

Romania officially declared, in 1993, its desire to join NATO and the European Union to consolidate its precarious national security. In an effort to reassure its former ally, Romania and Russia signed a treaty concerning bilateral military cooperation in 1994 and agreed to continue negotiations on the signing of the bilateral treaty on good-neighborly relations. Despite these efforts, bilateral relations quickly deteriorated. In April 1996, the Romanian-Russian relationship experienced one of its tensest moments, as the Russian Foreign Minister Yevgeny Primakov flew to Bucharest at the invitation of Romanian authorities to sign a renegotiated version of the bilateral good-neighborly relations treaty. Pressed by the opposition parties, President Iliescu changed his mind and Romania refused to sign the treaty, because it failed to address two of the most enduring bilateral disputes between the two countries: Romania decried the treaty's lack of clauses that condemned the Molotov–Ribbentrop Pact (1939) and that would establish a clear roadmap for the return of Romania's National Treasure stored in Moscow. Russia furiously denounced Romanian intentions as hostile and driven by irredentist inclinations towards territories within the Republic of Moldova and Ukraine, to which Moscow considered Romania might lay claim. Also, Russia complained that Romania refused to include a provision that would commit the two parties not to join alliances that are targeted against the other. Following this episode, all bilateral diplomatic visits were canceled. It was only in 1999 that Bucharest said it was ready to reconsider its relations with Moscow, both at political and economic level. By the mid-2000s, a third window of opportunity to normalize relations opened as a result of the 2000 Romanian general elections, which saw the Social-Democrat Party, considered to be closer to Moscow than other Romanian political parties, return to power. Eventually, in 2003, the bilateral treaty on good-neighborly relations was signed, but without addressing any of the contentious issues between the two parties: the condemnation of the Ribbentrop–Molotov Pact, the return of Romania's national treasury, and the provision concerning the parties' commitment not to participate in that are targeted against the other.

A series of high-level contacts culminated with a visit of President Traian Băsescu to Moscow in 2005, but his statements at the time, of overcoming historical prejudice of the previous 15 years, did not take shape as the relations continued to freeze.

A main source of tension continues to be the status of Moldova. The conflict over Moldova, or Bessarabia, is not new. It has been ongoing between Romania and Russia for over a century, due to Russia's strategic interests in the region conflicting with Romania's goal of a unified pan-Romanian state. Bessarabia, now known to most of the world as Moldova, was originally a region within Moldavia, and in 1812 was ceded to Russia after the Treaty of Bucharest. The Southern Bessarabia was regained by Moldavia in 1856 after the Treaty of Paris, but ceded back to Russia after the Treaty of Berlin. Bessarabia was briefly regained by Romania between 1918 and 1940, then retaken by the Soviet Union in 1940, regained by Romania after Operation Barbarossa and lost again to the Soviet Union in 1944 (confirmed by the Paris Peace Treaties in 1947). Romanians may view Moldova as being "stolen" by Russia. At the time of the fall of the Soviet Union, the Romanian language (under the controversial name of the "Moldovan language") with a Latin script was mandated as the official language of Moldova, causing conflict with non Romanian-speaking regions (namely, Gagauzia and Transnistria). However, Moldova opted against rejoining Romania at the time, claiming that it had a separate national identity (see: Moldova–Romania relations; Unification of Moldova and Romania).

On 10 February 2015, Vladimir Evseev, the director of Moscow's Center for Political and Military Studies, has warned that if Romania allows itself to be involved in the confrontation between Russia and NATO, "it is impossible not to put various military bases in Romania on the list of targets to be neutralized with various kinds of weapons." He says that "Russia is terribly worried that cruise missiles may be launched [from military bases about to be built in Romania] as well". Romania's president Klaus Iohannis soon approved the temporary deployment of up to 250 U.S. soldiers at a military base in the east of the country. He has also approved a request from the U.S. to use Romania's largest airport in Otopeni as an alternative for transport operations.

On 26 April 2021, due to a diplomatic crisis between Russia and the Czech Republic involving spies in the latter's territory, Romania expelled a diplomat at the embassy of Russia at Bucharest, Alexei Grichayev, and declared him a persona non grata in solidarity with the Czech Republic. Other NATO member countries also expressed intention to do similar actions. Time later, a video showing Grichayev allegedly trying to get classified information in Romania regarding its foreign policy, army and energy sector was released.

==== Since 2022 ====
On 13 March 2022, while the Russian invasion of Ukraine was taking place, an unarmed Russian Orlan-10 reconnaissance drone crashed in the Romanian village of Tărpiu. This followed a similar incident in Zagreb, Croatia, which happened a few days before.

After the Russian invasion of Ukraine started, Romania, as one of the EU countries, imposed sanctions on Russia, and Russia added all EU countries to its list of "unfriendly nations". Romania joined other countries in spring 2022 in declaring a number of Russian diplomats personae non gratae.

Starting in late April 2022, the Russian hacking group Killnet launched a series of cyberattacks against Romanian government and other official websites. This happened after a visit from Romanian authorities to Kyiv where more support for Ukraine was promised while the Russian invasion of the country was still occurring.

Disapproval of the Russian leadership shown in a poll in Romania rose from 37% in 2021 to 79% in 2022.

On 22 June 2023, during the Russian invasion of Ukraine, Ukraine destroyed a bridge at Chonhar connecting Crimea with Russian-occupied parts of southern mainland Ukraine. Following this, Vladimir Saldo, the Russian-appointed governor of occupied Kherson Oblast, threatened that Russia would destroy bridges in Odesa in Ukraine but also a bridge connecting Giurgiulești in Moldova with Galați in Romania. The Prime Minister of Romania Marcel Ciolacu strongly condemned Saldo's threats to both Moldova and Romania. He also hinted that Romania is a member of NATO, described Kherson Oblast as illegally occupied by Russia and stated that striking civilian infrastructure is a war crime. A spokesman for the Ministry of Foreign Affairs and European Integration of Moldova, Igor Zaharov, also condemned Saldo's declarations.

On 9 October 2024, Russia closed the Romanian consulate-general from Rostov-on-Don on the basis of Romania's "unfriendly actions". Previously, Romania decided to reduce the Russian embassy staff by 40 people in 2023 and expelled several officials from the embassy since 2022.

On 29 May 2026, the President of Romania announced that the Russian consul-general in Constanța was declared a persona non grata and the consulate-general will be closed. The decision was taken following a meeting of the Supreme Council of National Defence (CSAT), convened in response to the Russian drone which crashed in an apartment building in Galați. Moreover, the Romanian Ministry of Foreign Affairs labelled the drone crash a "serious violation of international law" and expressed concern that the incident raises the risk of an open confrontation between Russia and NATO states. In return, Russia announced the closure of the Romanian consulate-general in Saint Petersburg on 25 June 2026.

Romania recalled its ambassador to Russia, while also declaring a Russian embassy employee persona non grata, and summoning the Russian ambassador after three Russian drones violated Romanian airspace between July 24 and 26. On August 27, Russia responded by summoning Romania's chargé d'affaires and expelling a Romanian employee of the Embassy in Moscow.

== Dispute over the Romanian Treasure ==
After the fall of the Soviet Union, the Russian governments' position toward the Romanian Treasure remained the same and various negotiations failed. The Romanian-Russian treaty of 2003 did not mention the Treasure; presidents Ion Iliescu and Vladimir Putin decided to create a commission to analyze this problem, but no advances were made.

== Dispute over Bessarabia ==
Regarding the annexation of Bessarabia, the Romanian historian A.D. Xenopol said:

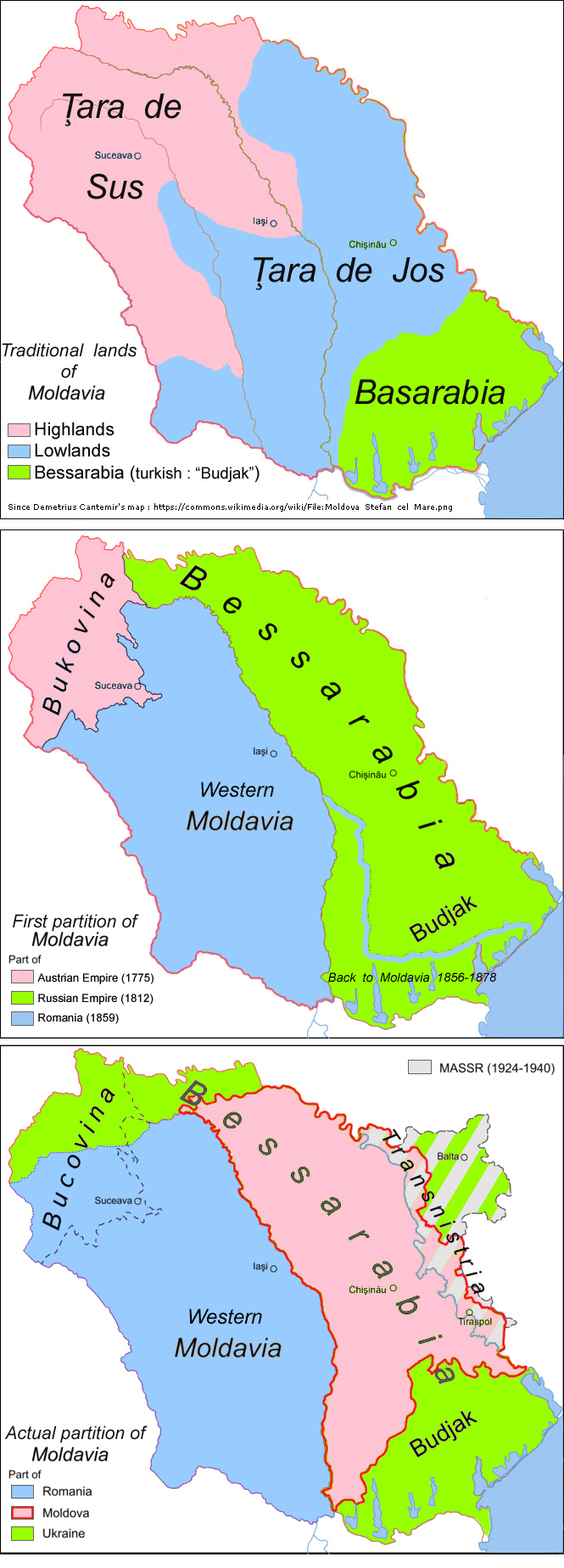
Partitions of Moldavia

Răpirea Basarabiei ar fi trebuit să înveţe pe români cu lucrul: că dacă există vreun pericol pentru existenţa lor ca naţiune, acesta va veni de la nord; dacă este vreun element adevărat duşman al elementului român, este acel rusesc, care nu din întâmplare, din neîngrijire pune în pericol existenţa noastră, ci lucrează cu conştiinţă la distrugerea ei. Acest pericol l-au simţit toţi românii acei ce şi-au iubit într-adevăr poporul şi care au binemeritat de patria lor. Toată dezvoltarea noastră naţională este datorită luptei neîmpăcate în contra acestui element cotropitor, luptă în mare parte susţinută cu ajutorul apusului. În asemenea împrejurări, a face politică rusească este a da noi înşine arma în mîinile ucigaşului, este a trăda interesele cele mai sfinte ale cauzei române.

The theft of Bessarabia should teach Romanians one fact: if a threat to their existence as a nation existed, this comes from the North; if there was one true enemy of the Romanian element, this is the Russian [threat], that not incidentally or callously endangers our existence, but labors with clear aforethought towards its destruction. This peril has been felt by all Romanians, those who truly loved and sought well to their nation. Our entire national development owes itself to this unreconciled struggle against this onslaught, struggle principally supported with the aid of the West. In such circumstances, to forward Russian politics would be to hand over the weapon ourselves into the hands of the murderer, would be to betray the most holy interests of the Romanian cause.

Friedrich Engels on the annexation:

If for the conquests of Catherine, Russian chauvinism was capable to find some pretexts- I do not wish to say justification but excuse- for the conquests of Alexander there cannot be the talk of anything as such. Finland is Finnish and Swedish, Bessarabia- Romanian, and Poland- Polish. Here there cannot be the talk of uniting related, dispersed nations, that all bear the names of Russians, here we are dealing simply with a conquest by force of foreign territories, simply a theft.

== Territorial clashes ==
Relationships have traditionally been strained by successive geopolitical disputes that saw Romania caught in the crossfire between repeated Russo-Turkish wars, and Russo-Romanian territorial disagreements. Romanian territory has been crossed by Russian armies multiple times throughout history.

Russian entries into Romania:

I. In 1735, a new Russo-Turkish war ignites. Russian armies invade Moldavia. The peace is signed in Iași.

II. 1768, Russia clashes once more with Turkey. Russian armies invade the Romanian Principalities. Catherine II, requests the annexation of the two Principalities, or at least their independence with the intent to annex them later. These requests unease Austria and Prussia, that opposed Russia's expansionist designs in Southern Europe. Treaty of Küçük Kaynarca is signed.

III. 1787 sees a new Russia-Turkish war. Russia crosses the Dniester river a third time, the eastern border of Moldavia. The Peace Treaty in Iași (1792) obliges Turkey to cease to Russia the territory between Bug and Dniester, known under the name of Transnistria.

IV. 1806, a new Russo-Turkey confrontation brings the Russians renewed in the Romanian Principalities. Following the weakening of the Ottoman Empire, Austria and Russia oppose each other in their desire to annex these provinces. Such intentions cancelled each other and Russia was forced to withdraw beyond the Dniester.

The impact of these successive occupations of Moldavia and Wallachia was devastating. The French Major General Louis Auguste François Mariage observes: "the inhabitants were more exposed, aside these requisitionings, let's call them regular, to any sort of abuse, theft, plundering, that brought them into poverty" or "… the Russian army destroyed this country [Wallachia] to such a level, that at the beginning of the year, she offered nothing more than the image of a waste."

V. A new crossing into Romanian territory (the fifth) occurs in 1811, during the Russo-Turkish war. Turkey is defeated, and is requested to cede the territory of Moldavia up to the Siret River. As Napoleon had decided on attacking Russia, these [Russia] hasten to sign a peace treaty with the Ottomans, and accept only the territory between Dniester and Prut (Turkey had guaranteed the territorial integrity of the Romanian Principalities when these accepted to enter a status of vassals in the 1500s, so the annexation lacked any legal means. Russia annexes Bessarabia and begins the process of Russification.

VI. On the eve of the Greek Uprising against Turkey, and the attempt to draw in the Romanian Principalities into the conflict, Russian troops again cross the border.

VII. 1828 sees another Russo-Turkish war. Russia occupies Moldavia and Dobrogea for 6 years. Pavel Kiselyov was appointed to command the Russian occupying troops in Wallachia and Moldavia, and appointed Plenipotentiary President of the Divans in Wallachia and Moldavia (de facto governor) on October 19, 1829 (he was in Zimnicea at the time). He remained the most powerful man in the Danubian Principalities until 1834. The poverty inflicted on the local population was extreme: "The Russian occupation came with its set of ills: unbearable thefts, incessant requests for carts for transportation, brutality and abuse that befell the people."

VIII. The Romanian Revolutions of 1848 (Wallachian Revolution, Moldavian Revolution) were also suppressed through the intervention of Russian troops, that invade for an eight time Romanian territory. The Convention of Balta Liman, decides the stationing of 35 000 Russian soldiers in the principalities.

IX. 1853. A renewed Russian invasion. The treasury of the Romanian principalities is plundered. 1853 the Crimean War erupts. Its peace treaty decides restituting Southern Bessarabia to Moldavia.

X. 1877 renewed Russo-Turkish War (Romanian War of Independence, in Romanian historiography). Despite guaranteeing the integrity of Romania, the conclusion of the war sees the Russian annexation of Southern Bessarabia. Romania receives Dobrogea following the Treaty of Berlin.

XI. 1916. Russian forces accidentally cross into Mamornița, Romanian territory, and a clash occurs there, ending in Russian withdrawal.

== Gallery ==
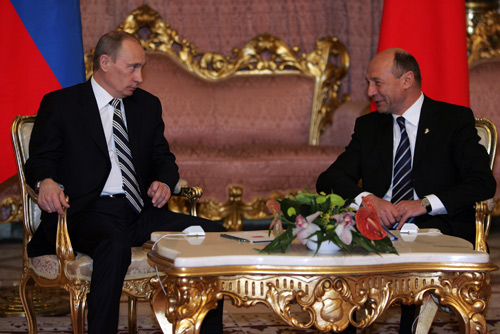
Vladimir Putin and Romanian President Traian Băsescu at the 2008 Bucharest summit

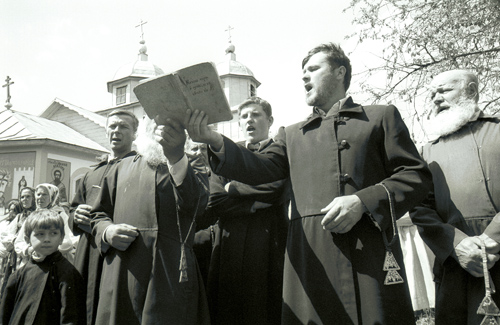
Lipovans (Russian Old Believers) during a ceremony in front of their church in a Romanian village

== See also ==
- Foreign relations of Romania
- Foreign relations of Russia
- List of ambassadors of Russia to Romania
- Romanians in Russia
- Russians in Romania
