= Battle of Lutsk =

Part of the Brusilov Offensive (1916)

- Part of the Brusilov offensive of World War I
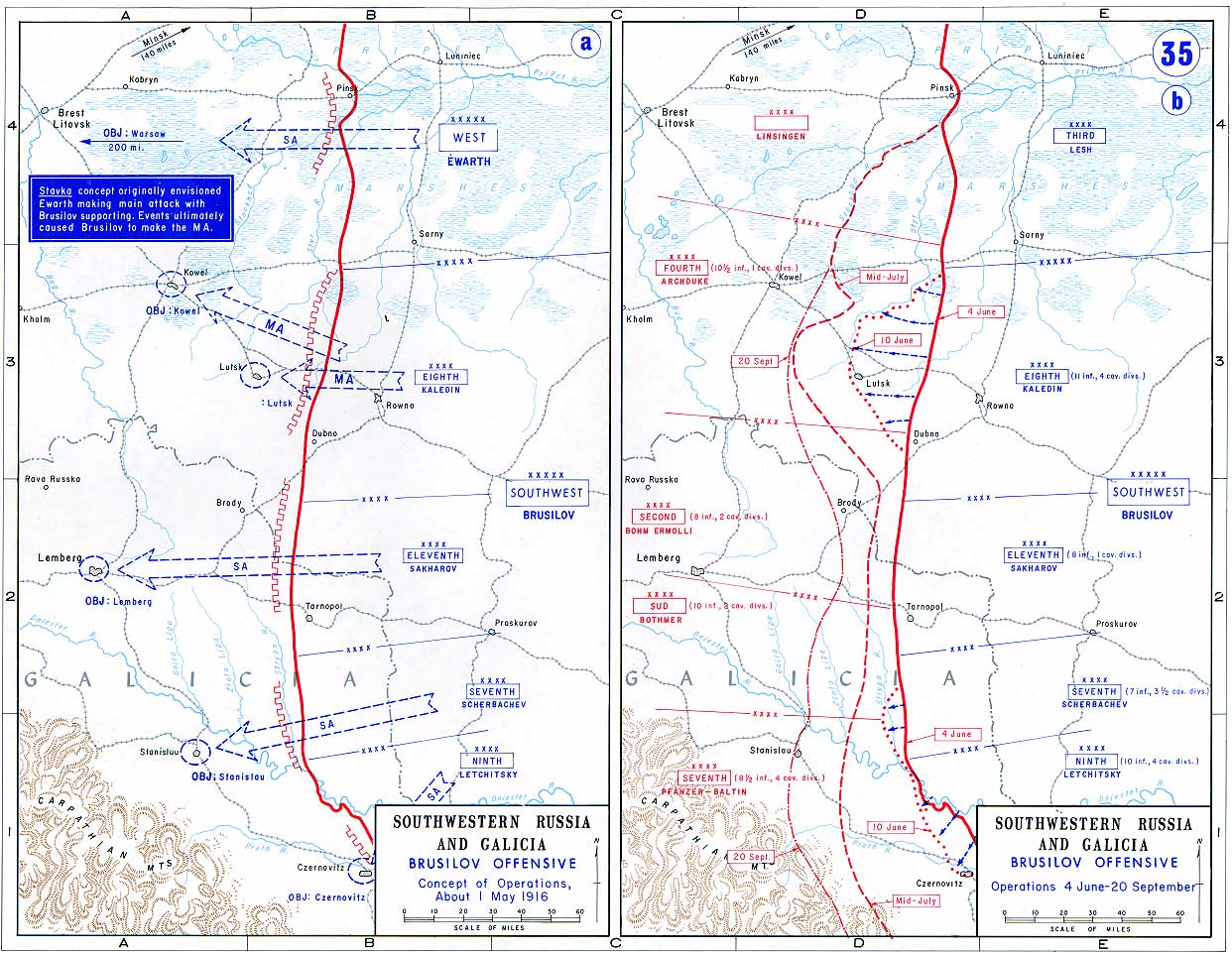
| Date | 4 June – 6 June 1916 (2 days) |
| Location | Lutsk, Volhynia |
| Result | Russian victory |
| Territorial changes | Lutsk is retaken by Russian forces. |

Belligerents
| Russian Empire | Austria-Hungary |

Commanders and leaders
| Aleksei Kaledin | (Austria-Hungary) Archduke Joseph Ferdinand |

Units involved
| 8th Army | (Austria-Hungary) 4th Army |

Strength
| 150,000 men 2,904 guns | 200,000 men 600 guns |

Casualties and losses
| Total: 23,000; Unknown killed 11,000 wounded 100 missing | Total: 40,000; Unknown killed 2,000 wounded 300 missing |

The Battle of Lutsk took place on the Eastern Front of World War I, from June 4 to June 6, 1916. It was the opening attack of the Russian Brusilov Offensive. The Russian 8th Army, under the overall command of Aleksei Brusilov, made a decisive breakthrough in the defenses of the Austro-Hungarian 4th Army in the area of the city of Lutsk, present-day Ukraine. This paved the way for a Russian advance and ultimate victory in the Brusilov Offensive.

== Background ==
On June 4, 1916, General Alexei Brusilov, commander of the Russian Southwestern Army, launched an attack against the city of Lutsk in present-day Ukraine. The operation began with a large-scale artillery bombardment involving nearly 2,000 guns along a 200-mile front, stretching from the Pripet marshes to the Bukovina region and toward the Carpathian Mountains. This offensive was one of the most significant campaigns undertaken by the Triple Entente during World War I.

== Engagements ==
Commanded by Archduke Joseph Ferdinand, the Austro-Hungarian forces initially held a numerical advantage of about 50,000 men. However, Russian artillery fire disrupted their formations and weakened their defenses. As Brusilov’s troops advanced, they captured approximately 26,000 Austrian soldiers in a single day. Within two days, the Russian forces broke through the Austro-Hungarian 4th Army, advancing about 75 kilometers along a 20-kilometer front.

Casualties were heavy: estimates suggest around 130,000 Austro-Hungarian losses, including more than 200,000 prisoners. In response, Austrian commander Conrad von Hötzendorf redirected forces from the Italian front in Trentino back to Galicia to stabilize the situation.

== Consequences ==
By mid-June, the Austro-Hungarian position had become critical. Conrad informed German Chief of Staff Erich von Falkenhayn of the crisis, leading Germany to transfer four divisions from the Western Front to support Austria. This shift weakened German forces at Verdun, where French troops launched a counterattack on June 23, just before the British offensive on the Somme began.

The Brusilov Offensive continued through the summer, resulting in further Russian gains at battles such as Czernowitz, Kovel, and Brody. Overall, Austro-Hungarian losses reached about 1.5 million men, including 400,000 prisoners, and roughly 25,000 square kilometers of territory. By September, however, Russian resources were depleted, and the offensive ended on September 20, 1916.

Although Russia’s subsequent turmoil and revolution in 1917 overshadowed these achievements, the Brusilov Offensive permanently weakened Austria-Hungary, reducing its ability to conduct independent operations. From then on, Germany carried the primary burden of fighting on the Eastern and Western Fronts.

The success of the Battle of Lutsk and the wider Brusilov Offensive had significant diplomatic consequences. Romania, which had remained neutral since 1914, closely monitored the shifting balance of power. The scale of Austro-Hungarian losses and the demonstrated effectiveness of Russian operations convinced Romanian leaders, particularly Prime Minister Ionel Brătianu, that the Central Powers were vulnerable.

Although Romania’s entry into the war in August 1916 was primarily driven by political goals of national unification and territorial claims, the Brusilov Offensive reinforced the perception that joining the Entente offered a favorable opportunity. The offensive’s momentum suggested that Romania could secure gains in Transylvania and other contested regions, tipping the country’s decision toward intervention

== Aftermath ==
The Brusilov Offensive, beginning with the breakthrough at Lutsk, marked one of the most significant turning points on the Eastern Front in 1916. Although the Russian advance eventually stalled due to shortages of manpower and supplies, the initial victories had lasting consequences. Austria-Hungary suffered severe losses in both personnel and territory, weakening its ability to conduct independent operations for the remainder of the war. From this point forward, the Austro-Hungarian army relied heavily on German support to maintain its defensive lines.

The offensive also influenced the broader strategic situation. Germany was compelled to divert divisions from the Western Front, which affected its operations at Verdun and contributed to the timing of the Allied attack on the Somme. Politically, the scale of Austro-Hungarian setbacks encouraged Romania to join the Entente in August 1916, believing the Central Powers were vulnerable. While Romania’s campaign ultimately faced difficulties, its entry expanded the war and forced the Central Powers to fight on yet another front.

In the longer term, the Brusilov Offensive demonstrated the effectiveness of new Russian tactics, including shorter, concentrated artillery bombardments and coordinated infantry assaults. These innovations influenced military thinking across Europe. Despite Russia’s later collapse in 1917, the offensive permanently weakened Austria-Hungary and shifted the balance of the war, leaving Germany increasingly isolated in its struggle against the Allies.
