= Brusilov offensive =

1916 Russian offensive during World War I

Brusilov offensive (Fourth Battle of Galicia)
- Part of the Eastern Front of World War I
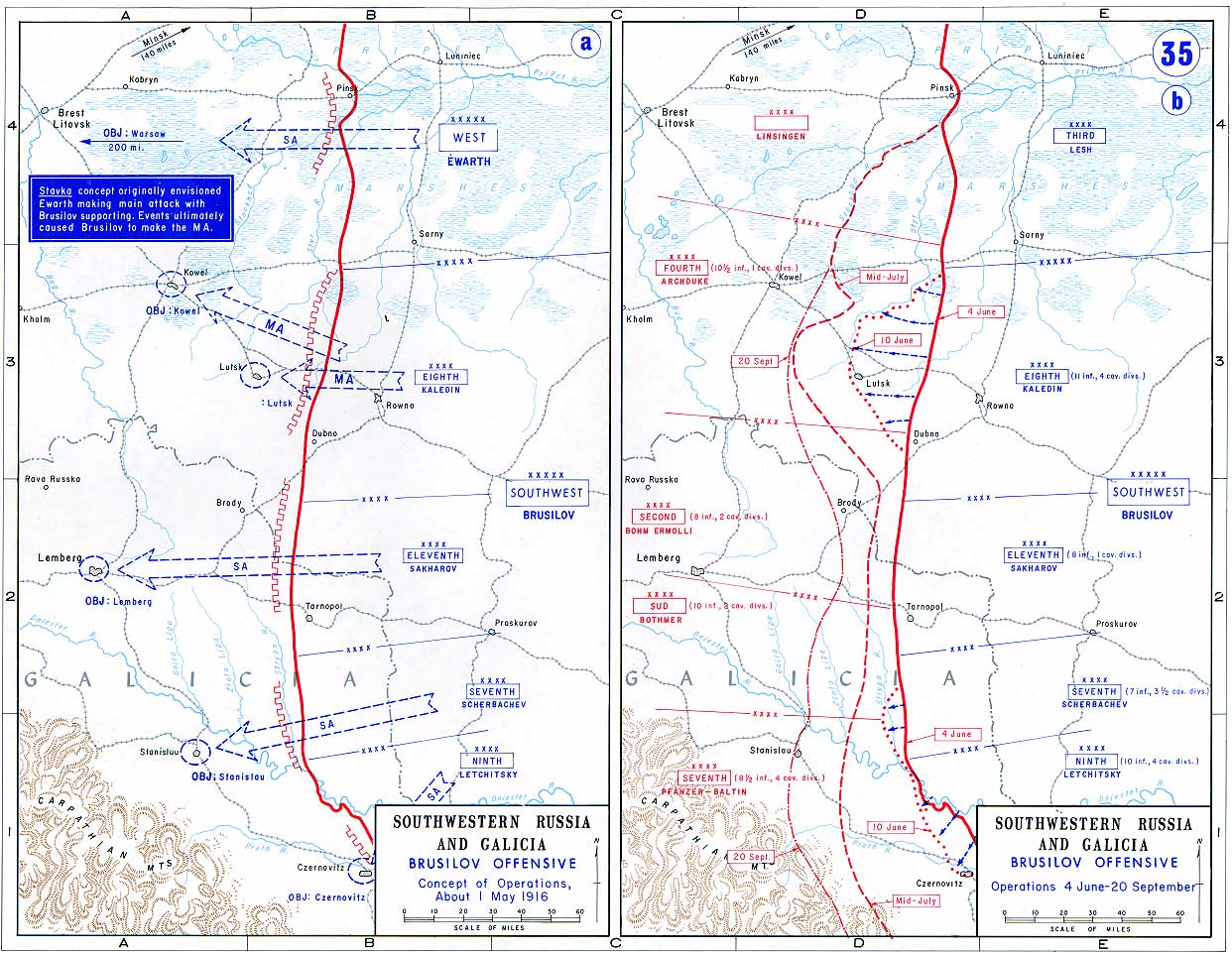
- Left: Plan of May. Right: Frontline at the end of Brusilov offensive in September 1916.
Date	4 June – 20 September 1916 (Note: Brusilov writes about this in his memoirs. O.S. 22 May – 7 September.)
Location	Galicia, present-day western Ukraine
Result	Russian victory Full results: Launch of the Romanian campaign; Entente forces seize strategic initiative on Eastern Front; Austria-Hungary loses offensive potential before the end of the war; Almost complete destruction of the 4th and 7th Austro-Hungarian armies
Territorial changes	Russia captures all of Eastern Galicia and a portion of northern Bukovina. Russia occupies the city of Czernowitz until its exit from the war.

Belligerents
Russian Empire	Austria-Hungary; German Empire; Ottoman Empire

Commanders and leaders
Aleksei Brusilov; Nicholas II (Note: Supreme commander-in-chief); Mikhail Alekseyev (Note: Deputy commander-in-chief); Alexey Kaledin; Vladimir Sakharov; Dmitry Shcherbachev; Platon Lechitsky; Mikhail Diterikhs	Conrad von Hötzendorf; Joseph Ferdinand; Eduard von Böhm; Alexander von Linsingen (German Empire) Paul von Hindenburg; Felix von Bothmer; Cevat Pasha

Strength
Initial: 40+ infantry divisions (573,000 men); 15 cavalry divisions (60,000 men); Overall: 1,732,000 in 61 divisions	Initial: 39 infantry divisions (450,000 men); 10 cavalry divisions (30,000 men); Overall: 2,500,000 in 54 Austrian divisions, 24 German divisions and 2 Ottoman divisions (Note: All reinforcements deployed against the actions of the southwestern front)

Casualties and losses
Russian Empire: Only from May to July 13: 440,000 dead or wounded 60,000 prisoners 497,000–500,000 estimated casualties Total: 1,000,000 – 1,440,000 casualties	Austria-Hungary: 200,000 dead or wounded 420,000–470,000 prisoners 670,000 estimated casualties Germany: 184,000–500,000 all casualties Ottoman Empire: 12,000 all casualties Total: 1,000,000 – 1,500,000 casualties

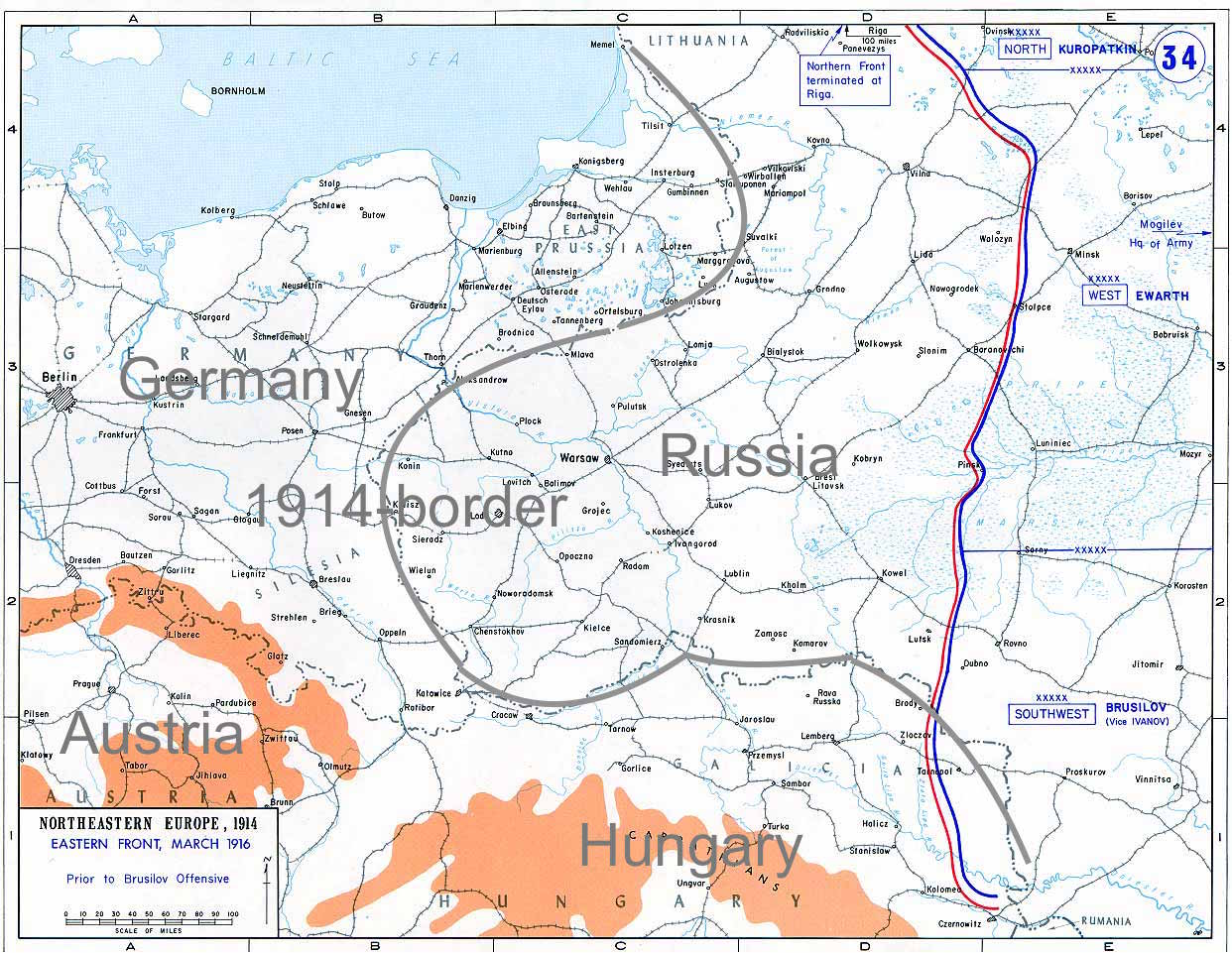
Blue and red lines: Eastern Front in 1916. Brusilov offensive takes place in lower right corner.

The Brusilov offensive (Russian: Брусиловский прорыв, romanized: Brusilovskiĭ proryv, lit. 'Brusilov's breakthrough') of June to September 1916 was the Russian Empire's greatest feat of arms during World War I and among the most lethal offensives in world history. The historian Graydon Tunstall called the Brusilov offensive the worst crisis of World War I for Austria-Hungary and the Triple Entente's greatest victory, but it came at a tremendous loss of life. The victory contributed to a morale upsurge among the Russian troops. The offensive's success led Russia's allies to reconsider their positions on postwar territorial concessions, including the status of Anatolia and the Bosphorus Strait.

The offensive involved a major Russian attack against the armies of the Central Powers on the Eastern Front. Launched on 4 June 1916, it lasted until late September. It took place in eastern Galicia (present-day northwestern Ukraine), in the Lviv, Ivano-Frankivsk, Ternopil, Chernivtsi and Volyn Oblasts. The Russian side captured cities such as Lutsk, Brody, Kolomyia, Chernivtsi and reached the Eastern Carpathian Foothills. The offensive is named after the commander in charge of the Southwestern Front of the Imperial Russian Army, General Aleksei Brusilov. The largest and most lethal offensive of the war, the Brusilov offensive, had far-reaching effects. It relieved German pressure on French forces at Verdun, and helped to relieve the Austro-Hungarian pressure on the Italians. It inflicted irreparable losses on the Austro-Hungarian Army and finally induced Romania to enter the war on the side of the Entente. The human and material losses on the Russian side also greatly contributed to the onset of the Russian Revolution the following year. It was the largest battle in World War I according to the total losses and forces of the parties.

== Background ==
Under the terms of the Chantilly Agreement of December 1915, Russia, France, Britain and Italy committed to simultaneous attacks against the Central Powers in the summer of 1916. Russia felt reluctantly obliged to lend troops to fight in France and Salonika, and to attack on the Eastern Front, in the hope of obtaining munitions from Britain and France.

In March 1916 the Russians initiated the disastrous Lake Naroch offensive in the Vilnius area, during which the Germans suffered only one-fifth as many casualties as the Russians. This offensive took place at French request – General Joseph Joffre had hoped that the Imperial German Army would transfer more units to the east after the Battle of Verdun began in February 1916.

Besides the complacency felt by the Germans and Austro-Hungarians after their successful defense of Russian attacks that winter and March, the Austro-Hungarians were in the midst of implementing their plans to knock Italy out of the war. Franz Conrad von Hötzendorf had transferred Hermann Kövess von Kövessháza' troops from the Balkans as well as four divisions from the Eastern Front. According to Prit Buttar, "To make matters worse, many of the experienced divisions on the Eastern Front were withdrawn and sent to the Alps, and replaced by formations largely composed of new inexperienced recruits."

== Prelude ==
At a war council held with senior commanders and the Tsar in April 1916, General Aleksei Brusilov presented a plan to the Stavka (the Russian high command), proposing a massive offensive by his Southwestern Front against the Austro-Hungarian forces in Galicia. Brusilov's plan aimed to take some of the pressure off French and British armies in France and the Royal Italian Army along the Isonzo Front and, if possible, to knock Austria-Hungary out of the war.

General Alexei Evert, commander of the Russian Western Army Group based in Smolensk, favored a defensive strategy and opposed Brusilov's proposed offensive. Tsar Nicholas II had taken personal command of the Imperial Russian Army in September 1915. Evert was a strong supporter of Nicholas and the Romanovs, but the Emperor approved Brusilov's plan. The offensive aimed to capture the cities of Kovel and Lemberg (in present-day western Ukraine); the Central Powers had recovered both these cities in 1915. Although the Stavka had approved Brusilov's plan, his request for supporting offensives by the neighboring fronts (the Western under Evert and Northern under Aleksey Kuropatkin) was denied.

On 26 May, the Tsar issued orders for accelerating the start of the Russian summer offensive, in response to pleas from the Italians facing Conrad's offensive. Brusilov would attack on 4 June, and the rest of the Russian army ten days later. Brusilov chose Alexey Kaledin's 8th Army to spearhead the capture of Lutsk and Kovel. Kaledin's attacking force included the 32nd Army Corps in the south, the 8th and 40th Army Corps in the centre, and 39th Army Corps in the north. The Russians fielded 148 infantry battalions against the 53 battalions in Archduke Joseph Ferdinand's 4th Army. Further south on the Austro-Hungarian front were Paul Puhallo von Brlog's 1st Army, Eduard von Böhm-Ermolli's 2nd Army, and Karl von Pflanzer-Baltin's 7th Army.

Mounting pressure from the western Allies caused the Russians to hurry their preparations. Brusilov amassed four armies totaling 40 infantry divisions and 15 cavalry divisions. He faced 39 Austro-Hungarian infantry divisions and 10 cavalry divisions, formed in a row of three defensive lines, as well as German reinforcements that were later brought up. Deception efforts on the Russian side were intended to conceal the point of attack. They included false radio traffic, false orders sent by messengers who were intended to be captured, and equipment displays including dummy artillery. Brusilov, knowing he would not receive significant reinforcements, moved his reserves up to the front line. He used them to dig entrenchments about 300 m × 90 m (328 yd × 98 yd) along the front line. These provided shelter for the troops and hindered observation by the Austrians.

Brusilov extended his army's trenches forward as far as possible, in some cases to within 100m of the Austro-Hungarian positions. Tunnels were also dug below the Russian barbed wire, allowing the entanglements to remain intact during the Russian attack. By these methods Brusilov hoped to lessen the exposure, and increase the surprise, of his attacking troops. Instead of massed formations, each of Brusilov's armies would attack along a 15km wide sector of their choice, attacking in waves with two reinforced infantry corps.

== Breakthrough ==
On 4 June, the Russians opened the offensive with heavy artillery fire. Alexander Winogradsky's artillery brigade used 76mm guns to open 24 breaches in the Austro-Hungarian defenses, coordinated in advance with the infantry commanders. Winogradsky wrote, this was followed by a "creeping barrage in front of the assault infantry...while the 152mm howitzers and 122mm guns attacked hard points." This was followed by attacks by infantry in Kaledin's 8th Army, Vladimir Viktorovich Sakharov's 11th Army, Dmitry Shcherbachev's 7th Army, and Platon Lechitsky's 9th Army.

On 5 June, according to Prit Buttar, "...the Russian gunners resumed their careful demolition work of the defences of Joseph Ferdinand's 4th Army... After two days of careful artillery fire and infantry attacks, Kaledin was confident their success was close. His troops had overrun both the first and second lines of enemy defences, and had inflicted heavy losses on the Austro-Hungarian 4th Army." Ferdinand was almost out of artillery ammunition, had used all of his reserves, and was forced to seek help from Alexander von Linsingen's Army of the Bug to the north.

By the end of 6 June, the X and II Corps, plus Sándor Szurmay's Corps, of the Austro-Hungarian 4th Army, had been pushed back to the Styr river and beyond, while Kaledin's 40th and 2nd Army Corps pushed onward to Lutsk. By the end of 7 June, the 4th Army retreat was unstoppable, with many elements of the X Corps surrendering when caught against the river, or casualties in attempts to cross. 4th Army supplies abandoned in Lutsk went up in flames as the Russians occupied the town. Further south, Pflanzer-Baltin's 7th Army was pushed back to the Strypa, as Shcherbachev's Seventh Army captured Jazłowiek.

The first major attack was against the 117,800 strong Austro-Hungarian 4th Army, in the northernmost sector of the front. The initial attack was successful, and the Austro-Hungarian lines were broken, enabling three of Brusilov's four armies to advance on a wide front (see: Battle of Kostiuchnówka). Within four days of the offensive, the Austro-Hungarian 4th Army saw its strength fall by nearly 70 per cent, from 117,800 men to just 35,000. The southern sector was held by the Austro-Hungarian 7th Army, which by 8 June lost 76,200 of its 194,200 soldiers.

Archduke Joseph Ferdinand was replaced by Karl Tersztyánszky von Nádas as 4th Army commander, and Hugo Martiny was replaced by Gustav Smekal as X Corps commander. After four days into the offensive, Buttar states, "Brusilov's revolutionary tactics had been stunningly successful: artillery had been used with a precision that was unprecedented; infantry had worked their way close to the defences before launching their attacks; and those attacks had not used the traditional lines of men that were so easy for machineguns and defensive artillery to destroy." However, Brusilov was informed by Alexeyev that Evert's West Front would not be able to commence their attacks before 18 June. Meanwhile, Linsingen ordered Friedrich von Bernhardi to gather German forces for a counterattack.

== Battle ==
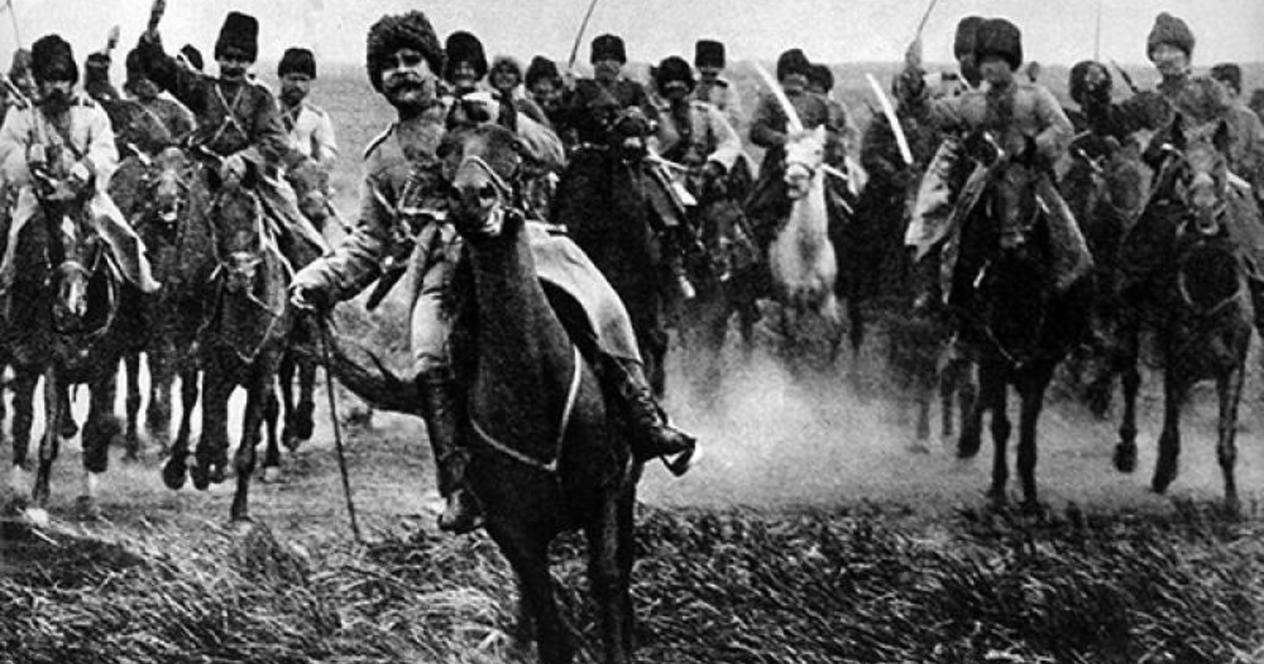
Attack of Russian cavalry (1916)

On 8 June, in response to appeals for help from Conrad, Erich von Falkenhayn organized five German divisions under the command of Linsingen, concentrating them near Kovel for a counterattack. Brusilov moved to protect his northern flank, while all of his armies continued to maintain pressure all along his Southwest Front.

On 9 and 10 June, Lechitsky's 9th Army advanced upon Doroschoutz, Okna and Czarny Potok, as Pflanzer-Baltin's 7th Army troops retreated. According to Buttar, "It was a graphic demonstration of Brusilov's theories. Pressure across a broad front forced the defenders to commit their reserves and left no sectors that could release troops to aid others." By 11 June, Pflanzer-Baltin's Gruppe Benigni and XII Corps were forming new defensive lines to the west, as his XI Corps retreated south across the Prut. According to Buttar, adding those killed, wounded, or taken prisoner, "...the Austro-Hungarian 7th Army was a shadow of its former self."

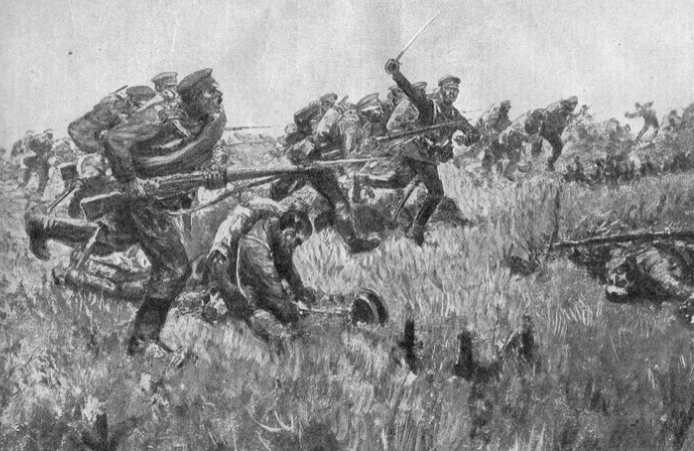
Russian bayonet attack

On 11 June, Felix Graf von Bothmer's South Army prepared a counterattack using Arthur Arz von Straußenburg's VI Corps. However, Scherbachev was ready and the front line remained unchanged.

On 11 June, while pursuing the Austro-Hungarian Army in Bukovina, Russian forces inadvertently crossed into Romanian territory, where they overwhelmed the border guard at Mamornița and had a cavalry patrol disarmed and interned at Herța. Having no intention to force the hand of the Romanian government, the Russians quickly left Romanian territory.

Lechitsky kept the 23rd and 41st Army Corps moving westward, while the 12th and 11th Army Corps advanced south to capture Czernowitz, and 3rd Cavalry Corps threatened Kolomea. By 12 June his Russian troops were attacking Austro-Hungarian positions along the Prut, and crossing that river by 14 June. By then, the Austro-Hungarian losses amounted to 205,000, of which 150,000 were prisoners.

On 17 June, the Russians captured Czernowitz, and Alexeyev transferred the 3rd Army from Evert's West Front to Brusilov's Southwest Front. Meanwhile, Bothmer's South Army prepared to attack southwards, hoping Pflanzer-Baltin's 7th Army could hold its ground.

On 18 June, Lechitsky was able to capture Kolomea. On 19 June, Russian cavalry, led by Mikhail Promtov crossed the Siret, and on 20 June reached the Carpathian Foothills. However, by the end of June, Southwest Front's casualties amounted to a costly 285,000.

On 15 June, Linsingen ordered a counterattack, concentrating around the Lutsk salient formed by Kaledin's offensive. Attacking forces included Puhallo's 1st Army, Tersztyánsky's 4th Army, Georg von der Marwitz's German X Corps, and Gruppe Bernhardi. However, after three days of fighting, little was changed in the position of the front lines, even after the addition of Gruppe Falkenhayn on 21 June. Linsingen then decided to reinforce that attack group in a thrust towards Lutsk, but under the command of Marwitz, with the attack to commence on 30 June. Brusilov was preparing his own continued offensive, with Leonid Lesh's 3rd Army advancing towards Pinsk, Kaledin's 8th Army towards Kovel, the 11th Army towards Brody, while the 7th and 9th Armies continued their advance. Brusilov met the German attacks on the Lutsk salient flanks by attacking in turn the German flanks. However, the Germans achieved only moderate success, pushing back the Russian 45th Army Corps 5km.

From 27 June to 3 July 1916, Brusilov carried out, on his own initiative, the deportation of 13,000 German civilians from the Volhynian areas that had been conquered during the offensive.

On 2 July, Evert's West Front finally started its offensive, with Alexander Ragoza's 4th army attacking north of Baranovichi. Yet, according to Buttar, "it was in almost every respect a replay of the disastrous attacks of March...an imprecise artillery bombardment, mass infantry attacks that struggled to make progress and lacked sufficient support to sustain early gains...". On 9 July, Evert suspended the operation, with the 4th Army losing 80,000, having advanced only 5km. Likewise, Kuropatkin's Northern Front offensive in mid-July failed to appreciably change the front line.

On 4 July, attacks by Lesh's 3rd Army and Kaledin's 8th Army forced Linsingen to withdraw westwards to the Stochod river on 6 July. On 5 July Archduke Karl took command of the new 12th Army, while on 9 July, Kövesz 3rd Army was created from a portion of Pflanzer-Baltin's 7th Army that had retreated westward. Pflanzer-Baltin remained in command of the 7th Army that had retreated towards the Carpathians.

Recognizing Southwest Front had the best chance to advance the Russian front lines, Ragoza's 4th Army was dispersed into Brusilov's 2nd and 10th Armies, and Brusilov was given Bezobrazov's Guards Army. Southwest Front now had a force of 700,000 men, compared to an opposition force of 421,000. Brusilov planned to advance towards Kovel on 20 July. Before then, on 16 July, the Siberian Corps forced Gruppe Marwitz to retreat back to the River Lipa. In an attempt to strengthen Marwitz, Puhallo's 1st Army was disbanded, and redistributed to Marwitz and Böhm-Ermolli's 2nd Army.

On 23 July, Sakharov's 11th Army attacked towards Brody, capturing it on 28 July, forcing Böhm-Ermolli's 2nd Army 7km to the west. On 28 July, Hindenburg was placed in command of the front up to the Austro-Hungarian 2nd Army, with Archduke Karl in command from that point south.

On 24 July, artillery preparations began for the Russian assault in the Battle of Kovel. According to Buttar, "The fighting that extended from 28 July into early August was curiously disjointed...Although Lesh, Bezobrazov and Kaledin all launched their attacks on the same day, none of them were able to maintain their efforts for long..." Lechitsky's 9th Army and Shcherbachev's 7th Army made simultaneous attacks further south, with Lechitsky able to advance the front line to outside Stanislau, capturing it on 11 August.

On 7 August, Brusilov resumed his offensive to take Kovel. By 8 August, the Germans and Austro-Hungarians had stopped the Russians, and on 9 August, Brusilov halted any further attempt to take Kovel. The offensive was essentially over, according to Buttar, "Attacks continued on until the autumn rains turned the roads to mud, but other than add to the already terrible casualty list, nothing was achieved."

== Aftermath ==
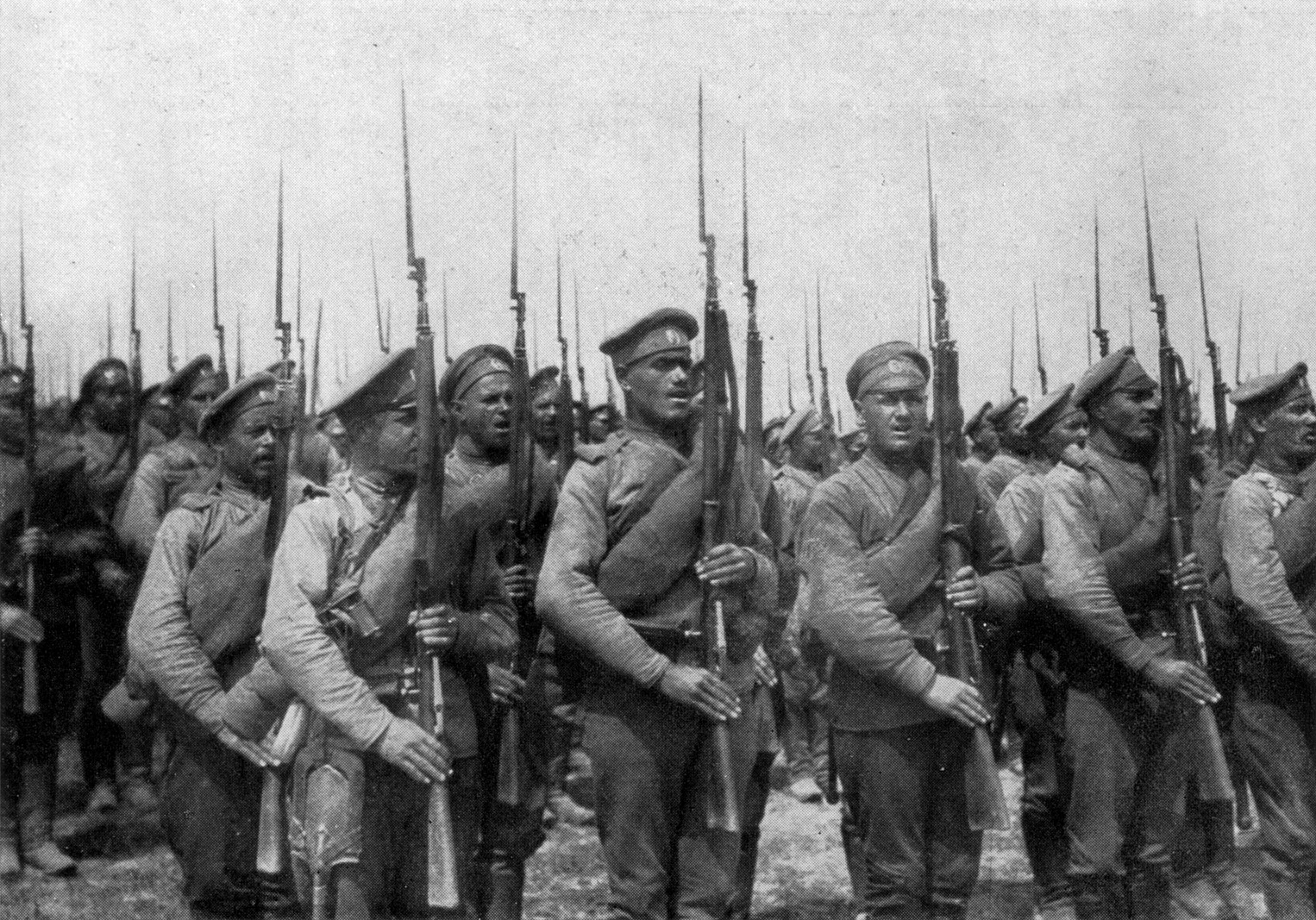
Russian infantry

Brusilov's operation achieved its original goal of forcing Germany to halt its attack on Verdun and transfer considerable forces to the East. Afterward, the Austro-Hungarian Army increasingly had to rely on the support of the German Army for its military successes. On the other hand, the German Army did not suffer much from the operation and retained most of its offensive power afterward. The early success of the offensive convinced Romania to enter the war on the side of the Entente, which led to the failure of the 1916 campaign. The Brusilov Offensive was the high point of the Russian effort during World War I, and was a manifestation of good leadership and planning on the part of the Imperial Russian Army coupled with great skill of the lower ranks. According to John Keegan, "the Brusilov Offensive was, on the scale by which success was measured in the foot-by-foot fighting of the First World War, the greatest victory seen on any front since the trench lines had been dug on the Aisne two years before".

The Brusilov offensive commanded by Brusilov himself went very well, but the overall campaign, for which Brusilov's part was only supposed to be a distraction, because of Evert's failures, became tremendously costly for the imperial army, and after the offensive, it was no longer able to launch another on the same scale. Many historians contend that the casualties that the Russian army suffered in this campaign contributed significantly to its collapse the following year. The operation was marked by a considerable improvement in the quality of Russian tactics. Brusilov used smaller, specialized units to attack weak points in the Austro-Hungarian trench lines and blow open holes for the rest of the army to advance into. These were a remarkable departure from the human wave attacks that had dominated the strategy of all the major armies until that point during World War I. Evert used conventional tactics that were to prove costly and indecisive, thereby costing Russia its chance for a victory in 1916.

The irony was that other Russian commanders did not realize the potential of the tactics that Brusilov had devised. Similar tactics were proposed separately by French, Germans and British on the Western Front and employed at the Battle of Verdun earlier in the year. The tactics would henceforth be used to an even greater degree by the Germans, who used stormtroopers and infiltration tactics to great effect in the 1918 Spring Offensive.

With the benefit of hindsight, it has been stated that Russia was not able to take advantage of its success nor cement it. In Russian society, pessimism regarding Russia's prospects in the war and distrust in the competence of its military and political leadership would continue to grow in 1916.

== Casualties and losses ==
Russian casualties were considerable, numbering between 500,000 and 1,000,000. Austro-Hungarian losses were around 616,000, while estimates place German losses at between 148,000 and 350,000. The Brusilov offensive is considered one of the most lethal offensives in world history.

However, the figure of 500,000 Russian casualties refers only to the period from May 28 to July 13, 1916, that is, the first stage of the offensive of the Russian Southwestern Front. A calculation from Russian military archives gives the following figure: 62,155 killed, 376,910 wounded and 59,802 missing. Total of 497,967 men for Russian Southwestern Front in just the first 1.5 months of the battle. And the losses of Austria-Hungary and Germany were 1,000,000 to 1,500,000 men for the period from June to December 1916.

The Ottoman 15th Army Corps, which arrived at the front in the midst of the fighting, also suffered severe losses. During the fierce fighting of September 16-17, the corps lost 7,000 soldiers and 95 officers. Soon, during the repulse of another Russian offensive on September 30, the Turkish defensive lines were again hit hard, resulting in losses of another 5,000 men. Thus, in these two key battles of September alone, the total losses of the expeditionary force reached 12,000 soldiers.

== Legacy ==
In June 2011, a monument of Unter-Officer of the Semyonovsky Life Guards Regiment Korney Nazarchuk was established in a local village near Lutsk. He fought in the ranks of the Imperial Russian Army.

== See also ==
- Nivelle offensive

== Bibliography ==
- Buttar, Prit (2016). Russia's Last Gasp: The Eastern Front 1916–17. New York, NY: Osprey. ISBN 978-1-4728-1277-3 – via Google Books.
- Dowling, Timothy C. (2008). The Brusilov Offensive. Bloomington, IN: Indiana University Press. ISBN 978-0-253-35130-2.
- Dowling, Timothy C., ed. (2015). Russia at War: From the Mongol Conquest to Afghanistan, Chechnya, and Beyond: In 2 Vol. Foreword by B. W. Menning. Santa Barbara, California: ABC-CLIO. ISBN 978-1-59884-947-9.
- Edmonds, J. E.; et al. (1995) [1935]. Military Operations France and Belgium 1918: The German March Offensive and its Preliminaries. History of the Great War Based on Official Documents by Direction of the Historical Section of the Committee of Imperial Defence. Vol. I (Imperial War Museum Department of Printed Books and Battery Press ed.). London: Macmillan. ISBN 978-0-89839-219-7.
- Gilbert, Martin (2023). The First World War: A complete History. Moscow: Квадрига. ISBN 978-5-389-08465-0.
- Glaise-Horstenau, Edmund, ed. (1934). Österreich-Ungarns Letzter Krieg 1914–1918 Band V: Die Ereignisse von August bis zur Jahreswende [Austria-Hungary's Last War 1914–1918 Volume Five: The Events from August to the Turn of the Year] (PDF) (in German). Vol. V. Translated by Hanna, Stan. Wien: Verlag der Militarwissenschaftlichen Mitteillungen. OCLC 442355341. Archived from the original (PDF) on 29 October 2019.
- Keegan, John (2000). The First World War. Toronto: Vintage Canada. ISBN 0-676-97224-1.
- Lohr, Eric (2003). Nationalizing the Russian Empire: The Campaign against Enemy Aliens during World War I. London: Harvard University Press. ISBN 0-674-01041-8.
- Stone, Norman (1998) [1975]. The Eastern Front 1914–1917. London: Penguin Books. ISBN 0-14-026725-5.
- Tucker, Spencer C. (2002). The Great War, 1914–1918 (Warfare and History). Routledge. ISBN 978-1-134-81750-4.
- Tucker, Spencer (2011). Battles that Changed History: An Encyclopedia of World Conflict. Santa Barbara, CA: ABC-CLIO. ISBN 978-1-5988-4429-0 – via Google Books.
- Tucker, S. C.; Roberts, P. M., eds. (2014). World War I: The Definitive Encyclopedia and Document Collection [5 Vol.] Foreword by H. H. Herwig (2nd ed.). Santa Barbara, California: ABC-CLIO. ISBN 978-1-85109-965-8.
- Tunstall, Graydon A. (2008). "Austria-Hungary and the Brusilov Offensive of 1916". The Historian. LXX (1): 30–53. doi:10.1111/j.1540-6563.2008.00202.x.
- Watson, Alexander (2015). Ring of Steel: Germany and Austria-Hungary at war 1914-1918. London: Penguin Books. ISBN 978-0-141-04203-9.

== Bibliography (in Russian or German) ==
- Borisyuk, Andrey (2024). Забытая война. Россия в 1914-1918 [The forgotten war. Russia in 1914-1918] (in Russian). Moscow: Вече. ISBN 978-5-4484-5078-5.
- Golovin, Nikolai (2014). Россия в Первой мировой войне [Russia in First World War]. Вече. ISBN 978-5-4444-1667-9.
- Haeften, Hans von, ed. (1936). Der Weltkrieg 1914 bis 1918, Die Militärischen Operationen zu Lande, Zehnter Band, Die Operationen des Jahres 1916 bis zum Wechsel in der Obersten Heeresleitung [The World War 1914 to 1918: Military Land Operations, Volume Ten, The Operations of the year 1916 until the Change in the High Command] (in German) (online scan ed.). Berlin: Verlag Ernst Siegfried Mittler und Sohn. OCLC 772473155 – via Die Digitale Landesbibliothek Oberösterreich (The Upper Austrian Provincial Library).
- Miltatuli, Pyotr (2017). Россия в эпоху царствование Николая II [Russia in the reign of Nicholas II] (in Russian). Vol. 2. Moscow: Русский издательский центр имени святого Василия Великого. ISBN 978-5-4249-0057-7. OCLC 1038064891.
- Oldenburg, Sergey (2022) [1st pub. 1939]. Царствование императора Николая 2 [The Reign of Emperor Nicholas II] (in Russian). Moscow: центрополиграф. ISBN 978-5-227-09905-1.
- Oleynikov, Alexei (2016). Россия-щит Антанты [Russia-Shield of Entente]. Foreword by Nikolai Starikov. St.Petersburg: Piter. ISBN 978-5-496-01795-4.
- Ruhlin, Alexei (2019). Брусиловский прорыв в Самарской и Симбирской печати и его итоги [Brusilov's breakthrough in the Samara and Simbirsk press and its results].
- Utkin, Anatoliy (2002). Первая Мировая Война [First World War] (in Russian). Эксмо. ISBN 5-699-01029-7.
- Zayonchkovski, Andrey (2002) [1929]. ru:Первая Мировая Война [The First World War]. St.Petersburg: Poligon. ISBN 5-89173-174-6.
- Брусилов, Алексей (2023). Мои воспоминания. Из царской армии в Красную. Moscow: Москва. ISBN 978-5-04-176827-0.
- Борисюк, Андрей (2023). История России, которую приказали забыть. Николай II и его время; [5-е издание]. St. Petersburg: Питер. ISBN 978-5-4484-3841-7.
