= 12th Army (Austria-Hungary) =

- Active: 4 July – 13 August 1916
- Country: Austria-Hungary
- Branch: Austro-Hungarian Army
- Type: Field army
- Engagements: World War I; Brusilov Offensive

Commanders
- Commander: Archduke Karl
- Chief of Staff: Alfred von Waldstätten

The 12th Army was a field army-level command of the Austro-Hungarian Army that existed only for one month during World War I, led by Archduke Karl Franz Joseph. It had been formed in response to the success of the Russian Empire's Brusilov Offensive, and was dissolved upon the formation of Army Group Archduke Karl.

== History ==
The Austro-Hungarian 12th Army was formed on the Eastern Front on 4 July 1916, and its commander was Archduke Karl Franz Joseph, the future Emperor of Austria. The 12th Army was again disbanded on 13 August 1916, around the time when the Archduke became commander of the Army Group Archduke Karl, fighting against the Russian Empire and Romania.

== Commanders ==
=== Commanding officers ===
	Rank	Name	From	To
1	Field Marshal	Archduke Karl Franz Joseph	4 July 1916	13 August 1916

=== Chiefs of staff ===
	Rank	Name	From	To
1	Major General	Alfred von Waldstätten	4 July 1916	13 August 1916
