= Alexey Kaledin =

Russian general (1861–1918)

Ataman Alexey Maksimovich Kaledin
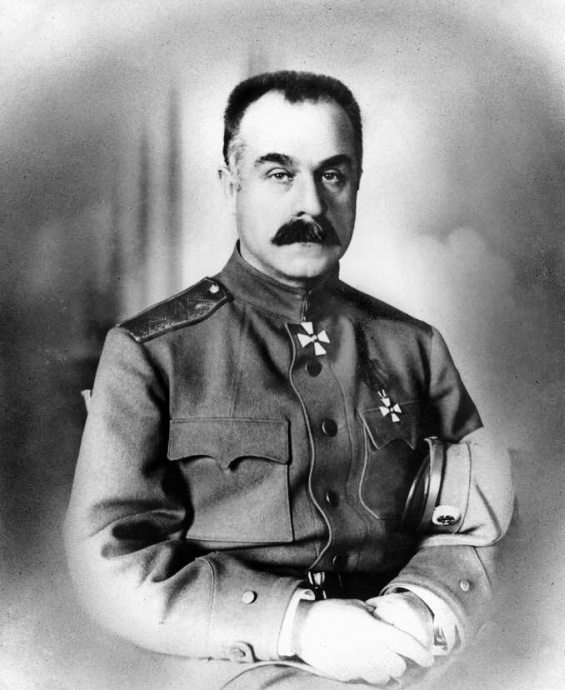
- Born: 24 October 1861; Ust-Khopyorskaya, Saratov Governorate, Russian Empire
- Died: 11 February 1918 (aged 56); Novocherkassk, Russian SFSR
- Military career
- Allegiance: Russian Empire; Don Republic (White Movement)
- Branch: (Russian Empire) Imperial Russian Army (Don Republic) Don Army (White Movement)
- Service years: 1889–1918
- Rank: General of the cavalry
- Commands: 12th Cavalry Division and 8th Army (WW1); Don Army
- Conflicts: Russo-Japanese War; World War I; Brusilov offensive; Battle of Lutsk; Battle of Kostiuchnówka; Russian Civil War

Alexey Maksimovich Kaledin (Russian: Алексей Максимович Каледин; 24 October 1861 – 11 February 1918) was a Don Cossack Cavalry General who commanded the 12th Cavalry Division and Russian Eight Army during World War I. He also led the Don Cossack White movement in the opening stages of the Russian Civil War.

== Early years ==
Kaledin attended the Mikhaylovskoye Artillery School and the General Staff Academy.

== World War I ==
Early in World War I Kaledin served as a cavalry commander before taking over command of a cavalry corps and rising to the rank of General of the Cavalry. On 23 March [N.S. 5 April] 1916 he became the commander of the 8th Army (part of the Imperial Russian Army's Southwestern Front). He participated in the Brusilov Offensive, of June to September 1916, winning the Battle of Lutsk in June 1916.

Kaledin spoke at the Moscow State Conference of August 1917, stating: "all Soviets and committees must be abolished, both in the army and in the rear". Following the Kornilov affair of August 1917, Kaledin retreated back to Novocherkassk and to the protection of the Cossack voisko to avoid arrest by the Russian Provisional Government.

On 18 June [N.S. 1 July] 1917 the Great Military Assembly (Russian: Большой Войсковой Круг, romanized: Bol'shoj Voiskovoj Krug) of the Don Cossack Host had elected Kaledin, aged 55, as their ataman. According to Peter Kenez, Kaledin "...thus became the first democratically chosen leader of the Cossacks since 1723."

== Civil War ==
According to Kenez, "On November 9, immediately after receiving news of the Petrograd revolution, and acting in the name of the voisko government, he invited the members of the Provisional Government to Novocherkassk to join him in organizing the anti-Bolshevik struggle." On 15 November, Mikhail Alekseyev arrived and started organizing a new army. On 20 November, the voisko declared its independence. On 5 December, Kaledin declared martial law when news came that a Red Guard detachment had been sent by the Soviet regime. Between 9 and 15 December, with the aid of the Alekseev Organization, Kaledin was able to suppress Bolshevik resistance in Rostov-on-Don, and then open the third session of the krug. On 19 December, Lavr Kornilov arrived, and by the end of the month, had reorganized the Alekseev Organization into the Volunteer Army. By January 1918, Vladimir Antonov-Ovseenko was threatening Rostov and Taganrog with a force led by Sivers. On 10 February [O.S. 28 January] 1918 Sivers had taken control of Taganrog, and Kornilov decided to retreat from the Don.

The prospect of the loss of Rostov-on-the-Don (Note: Rostov-on-the-Don fell to Sivers on 23 February 1918.) and the impending retreat of the Volunteer Army during their Ice March (Note: The Ice March took place between 22 February and 13 May 1918.) led Kaledin to believe that the whole situation had become hopeless. On (11 February [O.S. 29 January] 1918) he resigned from his post and committed suicide by shooting himself.

== Honours and awards ==
- Order of St. Anna, 3rd class (1897)
- Order of Saint Stanislaus, 2nd class (1902)
- Order of St. George, 4th class for the battle on the river near the village of Hnyla Lypa, October 12, 1914.
- Order of St. George, 3rd class for the Battle of Kalush, September 12, 1915.
- Sword of St. George
