= Army Group Archduke Karl =

Heeresgruppe "Erzherzog Karl" Army Group Archduke Karl
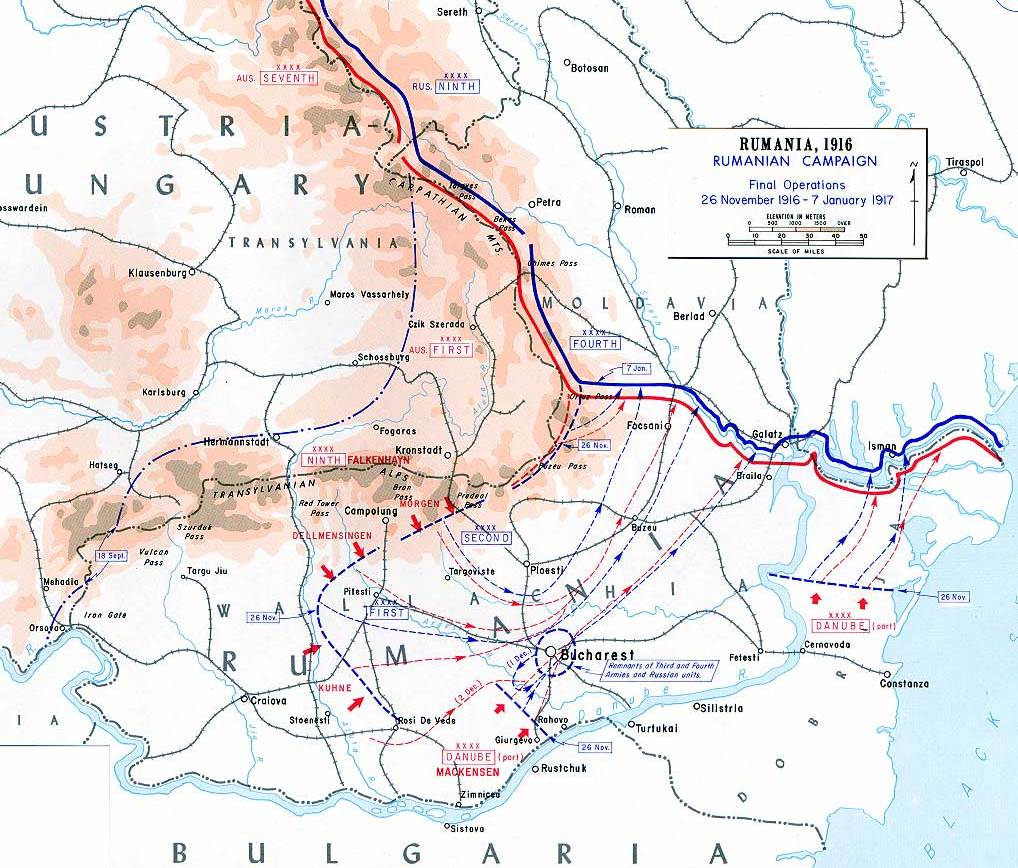
- The Romanian Front in the winter of 1916
- Active: June – October 1916
- Country: Austria-Hungary
- Branch: Austro-Hungarian Army
- Type: Army group
- Engagements: World War I; Brusilov offensive; Romanian campaign (1916)

Commanders
- Commander: Archduke Karl
- Chief of Staff: Hans von Seeckt

Army Group Archduke Karl (German: Heeresgruppe "Erzherzog Karl") was an army group of Austria-Hungary during World War I, established in June 1916 to fight against the Russian Empire on the Eastern Front and later in the campaign against the Kingdom of Romania. It was named for its commander, Field Marshal Archduke Karl Franz Joseph, who commanded the formation until October 1916. The following month, he became the last emperor of Austria-Hungary. The army group consisted of the 1st and 7th Armies.

== History ==
The army group was formed in June 1916 under the command of Archduke Karl in order to stop the Russian advance during the Brusilov Offensive. It was established as part of a reform of the seven army groups at the front, with Archduke Karl's formation including those under the command of Karl von Pflanzer-Baltin and Felix von Bothmer. Together, the new army group covered a front that stretched from the southwest of Brody through Bukovina. The army group were engaged in fighting against the Russian Imperial Army during that time, and thus it was considered to be an important part of the Eastern Front. Major General Hans von Seeckt, who was serving as the chief of staff under August von Mackensen, was transferred in the summer of 1916 to become the army group's chief of staff. Karl and von Seeckt worked well together and their army group, along with other units, was able to stop the Russian advance in the Carpathians.

During the summer, the Archduke's forces were reassigned to join the German 9th Army in Romania, which had declared war on the Central Powers in August. The army group took part in driving Romanian forces over the Seret River into northern Moldavia. The 1st Army, which was part of Archduke Karl's command, then guarded the northeastern border of Transylvania with Romanian-controlled Moldavia, which was where the Romanian government was based.

The army group was reorganized as Army Front (Heeresfront) Karl on 20 October 1916 and as Army Group/Front Archduke Joseph in November 1916, when Karl took the throne as Emperor of Austria-Hungary. Command of the new formation was given to Archduke Joseph August and it was transferred to the Italian Front, with von Seeckt remaining as the chief of staff of the reorganized army group chief of staff and Hauptmann Johann "Hans" Hasse (1878–1968) as signals-officer (both from the Imperial German Army) into December 1917.

== Organization ==
Army Group Archduke Karl consisted of the 1st Army and 7th Army. The army group was the only Austro-Hungarian formation that was independent of German command at that point in the war, although the chief of staff Seeckt exercised a lot of control over its operations.

== Commanders ==
=== Commanding officers ===
| | Rank | Name | From | To |
|---|---|---|---|---|
| 1 | Field Marshal | Archduke Karl Franz Joseph | June 1916 | October 1916 |

=== Chiefs of staff ===
| | Rank | Name | From | To |
|---|---|---|---|---|
| 1 | Colonel | Alfred von Waldstätten | June 1916 | July 1916 |
| 2 | Major General | Hans von Seeckt | July 1916 | October 1916 |

== Books ==
- Cron, Hermann (2007). Imperial German Army 1914–18: Organisation, Structure, Orders of Battle. Helion and Company. ISBN 978-1874622291.
- Herwig, Holger H. (2009). The First World War: Germany and Austria-Hungary 1914–1918. Bloomsbury Academic. ISBN 978-0340573488.
- The New York Times Current History: The European War (WWI). THA New Media LLC. 1917. pp. 991–992. ISBN 978-0384944299. "army group archduke karl."
- Thomas, Nigel (2004). The German Army in World War I (2): 1915–17. Osprey Publishing. ISBN 978-1874622291.
- Tucker, Spencer C. (2009). A Global Chronology of Conflict: From the Ancient World to the Modern Middle East. ABC-CLIO. ISBN 978-1851096671.
