= Alfred von Waldstätten =

Baron Alfred von Waldstätten
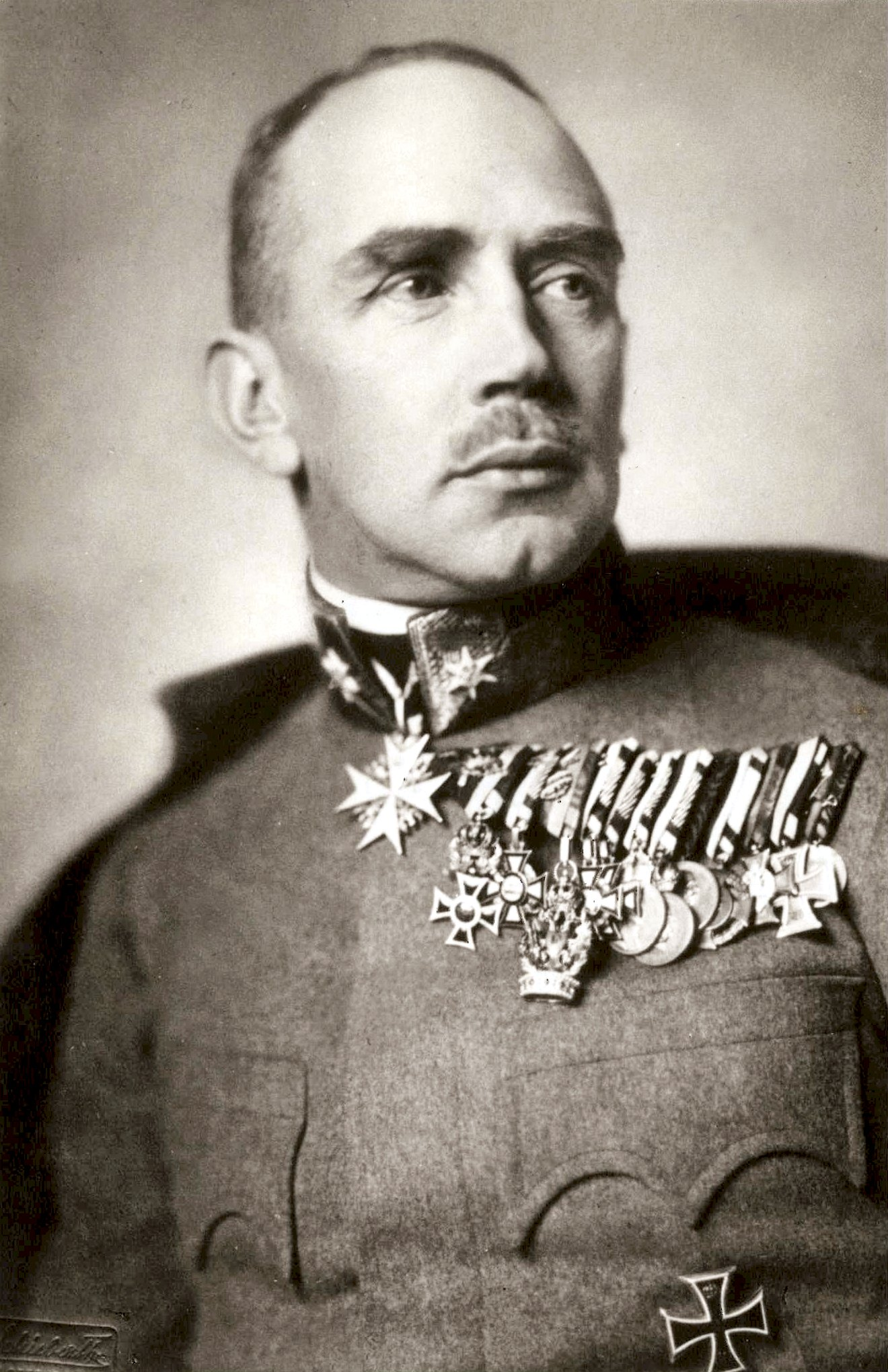
- Baron Waldstätten in 1911
- Born: Alfred Georg von Waldstätten; 9 November 1872; Vienna, Austria-Hungary
- Died: 12 January 1952 (aged 79); Mauerbach, Austria
- Military career
- Allegiance: Austria-Hungary
- Branch: Austro-Hungarian Army
- Service years: 1892–1918
- Rank: Generalmajor (Major general)
- Conflicts: World War I: Eastern Front; Italian Front
- Awards: Pour le Merite

Alfred Georg Heinrich Maria Freiherr (Note: The legal status of Austrian nobility was abolished in 1919, and as a result aristocratic titles became part of the holder's name.) von Waldstätten (9 November 1872, in Vienna – 12 January 1952, in Mauerbach) was an Austro-Hungarian Army officer holding the rank of Generalmajor (major general) who served during World War I. He held senior positions on the Armeeoberkommando (General Staff) and possessed significant influence over the Chief of General Staff, Arthur Arz von Straußenburg, and Emperor Karl.

== Biography ==
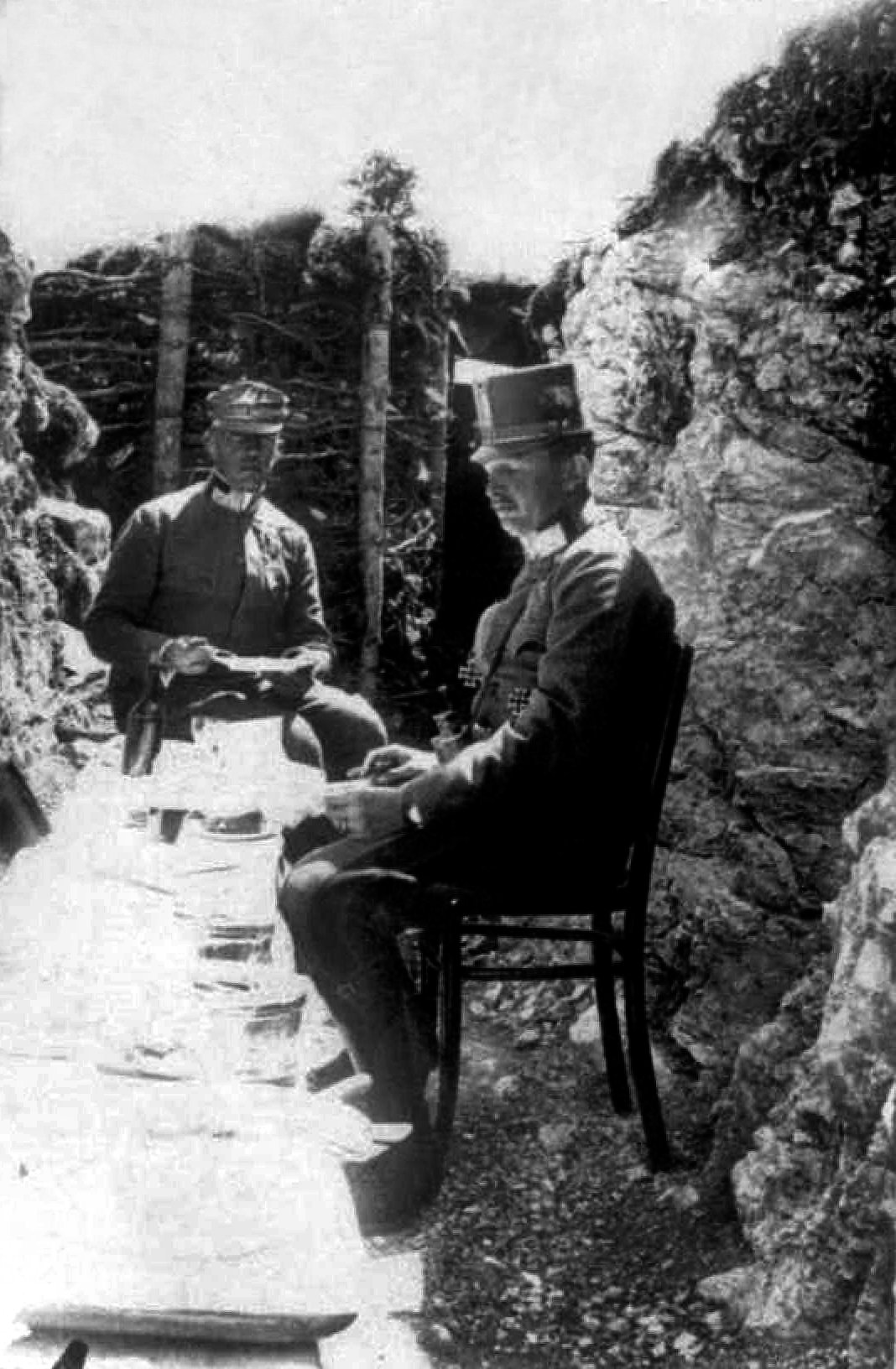
Waldstätten with Archduke Karl (1916)

Alfred von Waldstätten was born in Vienna, then the capital of Austria-Hungary, in 1872. He graduated from the Theresian Military Academy at the top of his class in 1892 and then again in 1897 from the War Academy. Thus he served on the Austro-Hungarian General Staff early on in his career and also had been the chief of staff for the 28th Infantry Division, based in Laibach. By the time World War I began in August 1914, Waldstätten was serving as an instructor at the War Academy.

Early on in the war he served on the staff of General Viktor Dankl von Krasnik during the Battle of Galicia, later serving on the Italian Front in 1915 as commander of XX Corps. In the summer of 1916, Waldstätten briefly served as the chief of staff for the 12th Army as well as Army Group Archduke Karl, commanded by the future emperor of Austria-Hungary, but was replaced by German officer Hans von Seeckt after a month.

In 1917, when Colonel general Arthur Arz von Straußenburg became chief of the Armeeoberkommando (AOK, General Staff), he had Waldstätten promoted to major general and made deputy chief of staff — a capacity in which he became the chief of operations for the Austro-Hungarian Army. During this time, he disagreed with Franz Conrad von Hötzendorf and Svetozar Boroević on the country's strategy for the Italian front, especially after the failures of their operations.

Retiring after the war, he died on 12 January 1952 in Mauerbach.

== Sources ==
=== Books ===
- Tucker, Spencer C. (2005). World War I: Encyclopedia. ABC-CLIO. ISBN 978-1851094202.
- Tucker, Spencer C. (2009). A Global Chronology of Conflict: From the Ancient World to the Modern Middle East. ABC-CLIO. ISBN 978-1851096671.
