= 32nd Army Corps (Russian Empire) =

- Country: Russian Empire
- Allegiance: Imperial Russian Army
- Engagements: World War I

The 32nd Army Corps was an Army corps in the Imperial Russian Army.

In 1915 it formed part of 9th Army and was commanded by Alexander Lukomsky. It was positioned on the Romanian border.

== Part of ==
- 9th Army: 1915
- 8th Army: 1915 - 1916
- 11th Army: 1916
