= Ust-Khopyorskaya =

Ust-Khopyorskaya Усть-Хопёрская
- Stanitsa
- Location within Volgograd Oblast Location within Russia
- Coordinates: 49°34′N 42°23′E
- Country: Russia
- Region: Volgograd Oblast
- District: Serafimovichsky District
- Time zone: UTC+4:00

Ust-Khopyorskaya (Russian: Усть-Хопёрская) is a rural locality (a stanitsa) and the administrative center of Ust-Khopyorskoye Rural Settlement, Serafimovichsky District, Volgograd Oblast, Russia. The population was 960 as of 2010. There are 18 streets.

== Geography ==
Ust-Khopyorskaya is located in steppe, 41 km west of Serafimovich (the district's administrative centre) by road. Rybny is the nearest rural locality.
