= Mamornița border clash =

- Part of the Brusilov Offensive of World War I
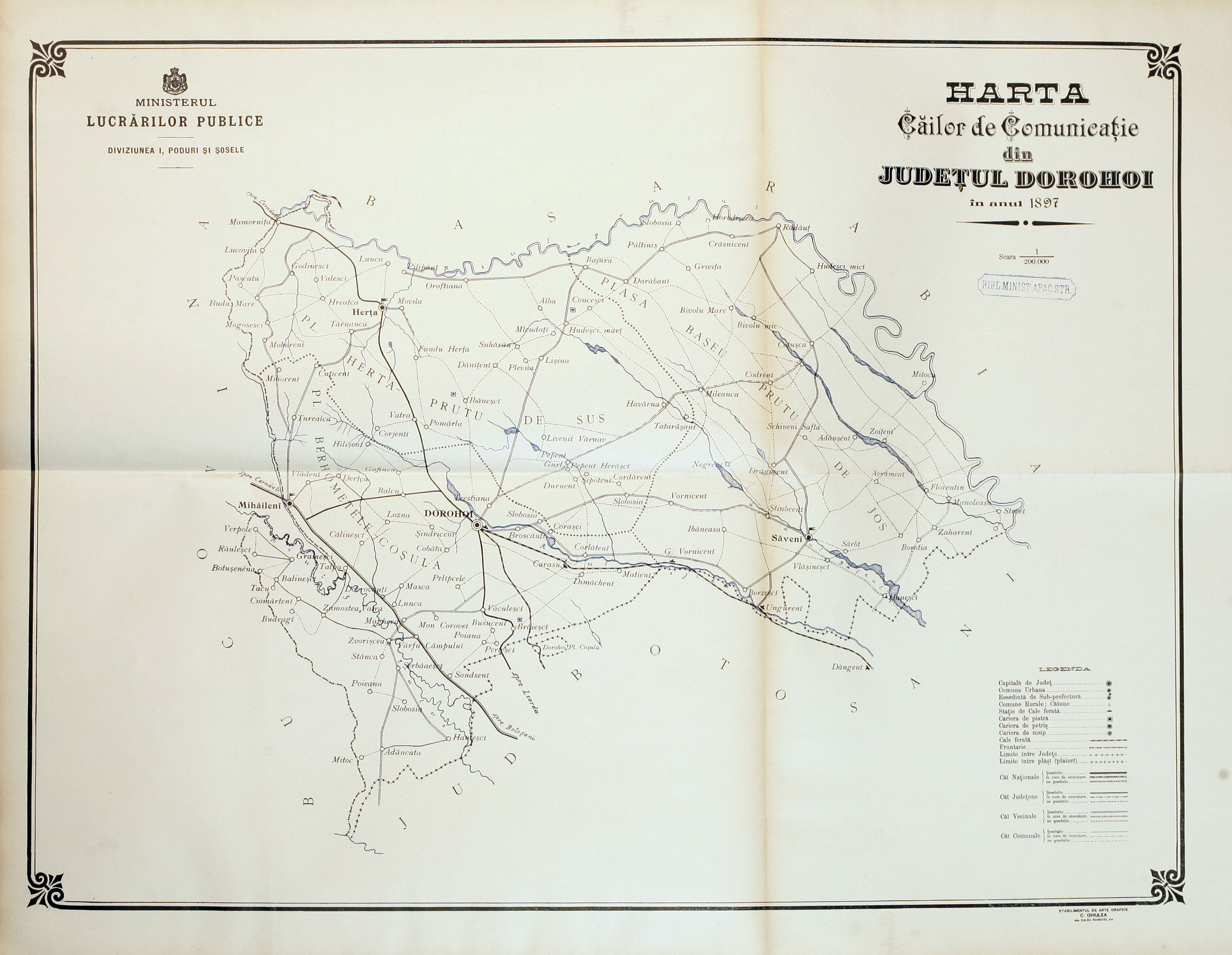
- 1897 map of Dorohoi County, with Mamornița and Herța visible in the northwestern extremity
Date	11 June 1916
Location	Dorohoi County, Romania (today Chernivtsi Raion, Chernivtsi Oblast, Ukraine)
Result	Russian withdrawal

Belligerents
Romania	Russian Empire

Casualties and losses
Unknown	1 cavalry patrol disarmed and interned

The Mamornița border clash was an incursion of Russian forces into Romanian territory during the Brusilov Offensive in World War I. As Romania was neutral at the time, the Russian forces left Romanian territory soon afterwards.

== Background ==
The offensive of the Russian General Aleksei Brusilov in June 1916 was significantly impacting the Romanian public opinion. The Russian advance soon reached the Romanian border, on the Prut River.

== Border clash ==
On 11 June 1916, in their pursuit of the Austro-Hungarian Army in Bukovina, Russian forces crossed the Romanian border. A Russian cavalry patrol crossed the Prut at Herța (Hertsa) and was disarmed and interned. Another patrol penetrated as far inland as Dorohoi. A proper armed clash, however, took place at Mamornița (Mamornytsia), where a Russian detachment crossed the Prut and overwhelmed the border guard.

== Aftermath ==
In Iași, where fear and mistrust of Russia remained the highest, a "League for National Defense" was created. Despite allegations from his Conservative opposition, the Liberal Romanian Prime Minister, Ion I. C. Brătianu, was thoroughly upset over the Russian incursion. The Russians, having no intention to force his hand, quickly left Romanian territory. The Russian crossing of the Romanian border was inadvertent.

Brătianu thought that these infractions were meant to test how Romania would behave. On 17 June, the Austro-Hungarian Minister to Romania, Count Ottokar Czernin, was fully satisfied by the proper attitude observed by Romania.
