= Constantin Grigorie =

Romanian diplomat

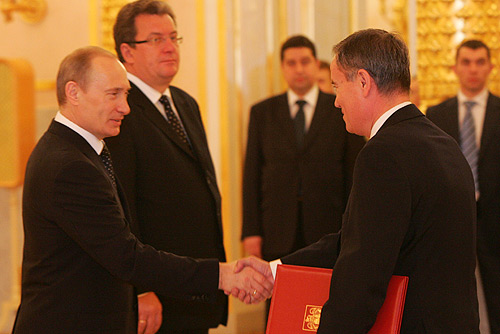
The Ambassador of Romania, Constantin Mihail Grigorie, presenting his credentials to the President of Russia, Vladimir Putin in 2008

Constantin Mihail Grigorie (born 1 June 1950 in Craiova) is a Romanian diplomat who served as the Ambassador Extraordinary and Plenipotentiary of Romania to the Russian Federation.

== See also ==
- Ambassador of Romania to Russia
