= Joseph Ferdinand =

Joseph Ferdinand may refer to:

- Joseph Ferdinand of Bavaria (1692–1699)
- Archduke Joseph Ferdinand of Austria (1872–1942)
- Joseph Ferdinand Damberger (1795–1859), historian of the Catholic Church
- Joseph F. Wingate (1786–?), American politician
