= Battle of Czernowitz (1916) =

Minor WWI battle

In June 1916, the Russians launched the Brusilov offensive in the Carpathian region of current day Ukraine. The second battle was at Czernowitz on 17 June 1916. The Russians enjoyed a manpower advantage but had almost equal numbers of guns and were outnumbered in heavy artillery. The battle led to a decisive Russian victory forcing the retreat of the Austrian army. Russian would remain in occupation of the city until a 1917-1918 offensive that retook the city.

== Background ==
The Battle of Czernowitz
| Location | Czernowitz, Bukovina |
| Result | Russian victory |

Belligerents
| Austrian Empire Austria-Hungary | Russian Empire Russian Empire |

Commanders and leaders
| Austrian Empire General Viktor Dankl | Russian Empire General Aleksei Brusilov Russian Empire General Dmitry Shcherbachev |

Strength
| 200,000 to 250,000 soldiers, 600 to 700 artillery pieces, 10,000 Animals | 150,000 to 200,000 soldiers, 500 to 700 artillery pieces, 15,000 to 30,000 Animals |

Casualties and losses
| 50,000 killed, wounded or missing. | 80,000 killed, wounded or missing. |

Bukovina lies on the northeastern foothills of the Carpathian Mountains, bridging plains in what is today western Ukraine with the greater Carpathian region. In June 1916, the Russians launched their Brusilov offensive, one of the largest and most decisive operations in Entente history. The Russians dealt a severe blow to Austro-Hungarian forces. The first attack came on the town of Lutsk on June 4, and Czernowitz on June 17. Czernowitz was located on the southern tip of the offensive in the region of modern day Ukraine known as Bukovina. The Battle of Czernowitz led to a decisive Russian victory, and is marked as one of the first and most important opening battles of the Brusilov offensive.

== The engagement ==
A partial mobilization order was posted in Czernowitz. This was followed nine days later by a general mobilization. Some inhabitants had already left the city due to the imminent battle. The southwestern front would attack with 573,000 infantry and 60,000 cavalry, supported by 1,938 guns, of which only 168 were heavy caliber. The central powers forces opposing them included the Austro-Hungarian First, Second, Fourth and Seventh armies and the German South Army, which collectively numbered 437,000 infantry and 30,000 cavalry, plus 1,846 guns, of which 545 were heavy. Thus, while the Russians enjoyed a significant manpower advantage and were almost equal in the number of guns, they were notably inferior in the all-important category of heavy artillery.

=== Minor Skirmishes ===
The skirmish at Rarancze dated from June 9 resulted in the Russians being soundly defeated by the Austrians just outside the city. This was celebrated as a great victory by the local patriots. Through, on July 17, the Battle of Czernowitz resulted in a Russian victory and forced the Austrian army's into a retreat and Russian generals would maintain a occupation of the city until a 1917-1918 offensive would retake the city.
