= 8th Army (Russian Empire) =

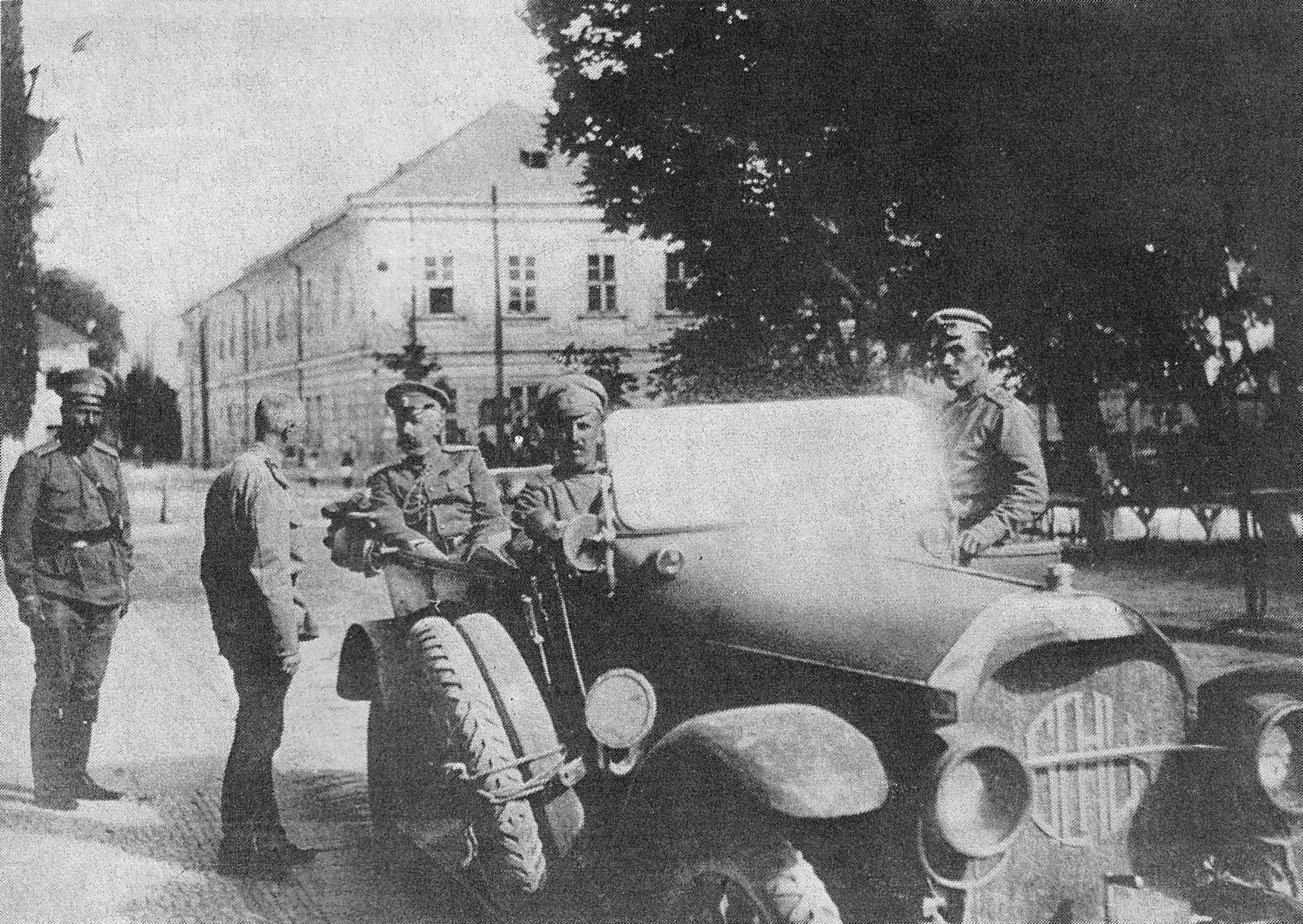
- Brusilov Aleksei A. and Grand Duke George Mikhailovich of Russia. 1915.
- Active: July 1914 – beginning of 1918
- Country: Russian Empire; Russian Republic
- Branch: Imperial Russian Army
- Type: Army
- Role: Land warfare
- Size: Field army
- Field HQ: Kiev
- Engagements: World War I Eastern Front Romanian Campaign

Commanders
- Notable commanders: General Aleksei Brusilov; General Lavr Kornilov

The Russian Eight Army (8-я армия, 8А) was a World War I Russian field army that fought on the Eastern theatre of war.

Field management was established in July 1914 at the headquarters of the Kiev Military District. The unit was disbanded in the beginning of 1918. At the beginning of the war the 8th Army was composed of the VII, VIII, XII, XXIV Army Corps.

== Military Fronts in which the 8th Army participated ==
- Southwestern Front (July 1914 - August 1917)
- Romanian Front (August 1917 - the beginning of 1918)

== Commanders ==
- 28.07.1914 – 17.03.1916 — General of Cavalry Aleksei Brusilov
- 23.03.1916 – 29.04.1917 — General of Cavalry Alexey Kaledin
- 29.04.1917 – 10.07.1917 — General of Infantry Lavr Kornilov
- 11.07.1917 – 25.07.1917 — Lieutenant-General Vladimir Cheremisov
- 30.07.1917 – 17.10.1917 — Lieutenant-General Michai Sokownin
- 18.10.1917 – 21.12.1917 — Lieutenant-General Mykola Yunakiv

== See also ==
- List of Russian armies in World War I
- List of Imperial Russian Army formations and units
