= South Tyrolean Army Group =

The South Tyrolean Army Group (German: Heeresgruppe Südtirol) was an army group of the Austro-Hungarian Army, which operated in South Tyrol against Italy, between 1 March 1917 and the end of World War I. It was also called Army Group Conrad (German: Heeresgruppe Conrad) and Army Group/Army Front Archduke Joseph (German: Heeresgruppe/Heeresfront Erzherzog Joseph) after its commanders.

== 1917–1918 ==
The Army Group participated in support of the German 14th Army during the Battle of Caporetto (October–November 1917) but it was badly defeated during the Battle of the Piave River (June 1918). The Army Group disintegrated during the Battle of Vittorio Veneto (October–November 1918).

The army group comprised:

- the Austro-Hungarian 10th Army (Alexander von Krobatin)
- the Austro-Hungarian 11th Army (Viktor Graf von Scheuchenstuel)

=== Commanders ===
- Franz Conrad von Hötzendorf (1 March 1917 – 14 July 1918)
- Archduke Joseph August of Austria (15 July 1918 – 26 October 1918)
- Alexander von Krobatin (26 October 1918 – 3 November 1918)
