= List of Austrian field marshals =

Field marshal Feldmarschall
- Rank flag

- Gorget patch
- Country: Austria-Hungary
- Service branch: Austro-Hungarian Army
- Rank: Field marshal
- Formation: 1805
- Abolished: 1918
- Next higher rank: None
- Next lower rank: Generaloberst (1915–1918); General of the branch (1805–1915)

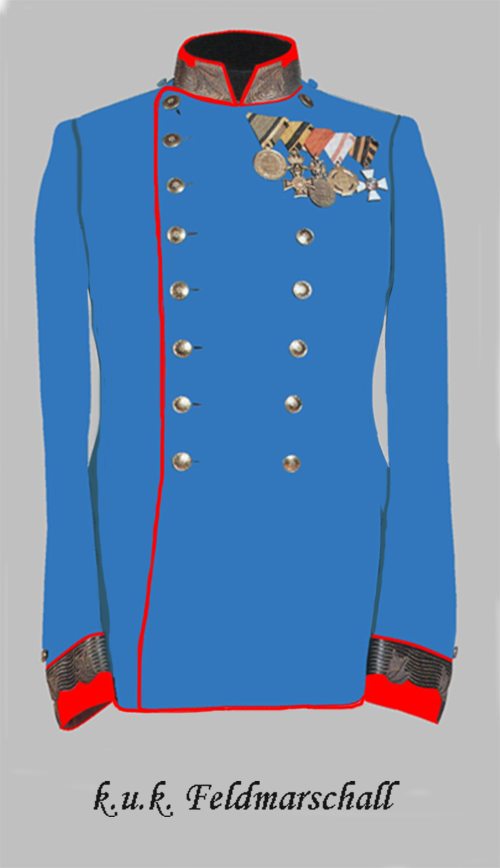
Feldmarschall of the k.u.k. Army (service uniform)

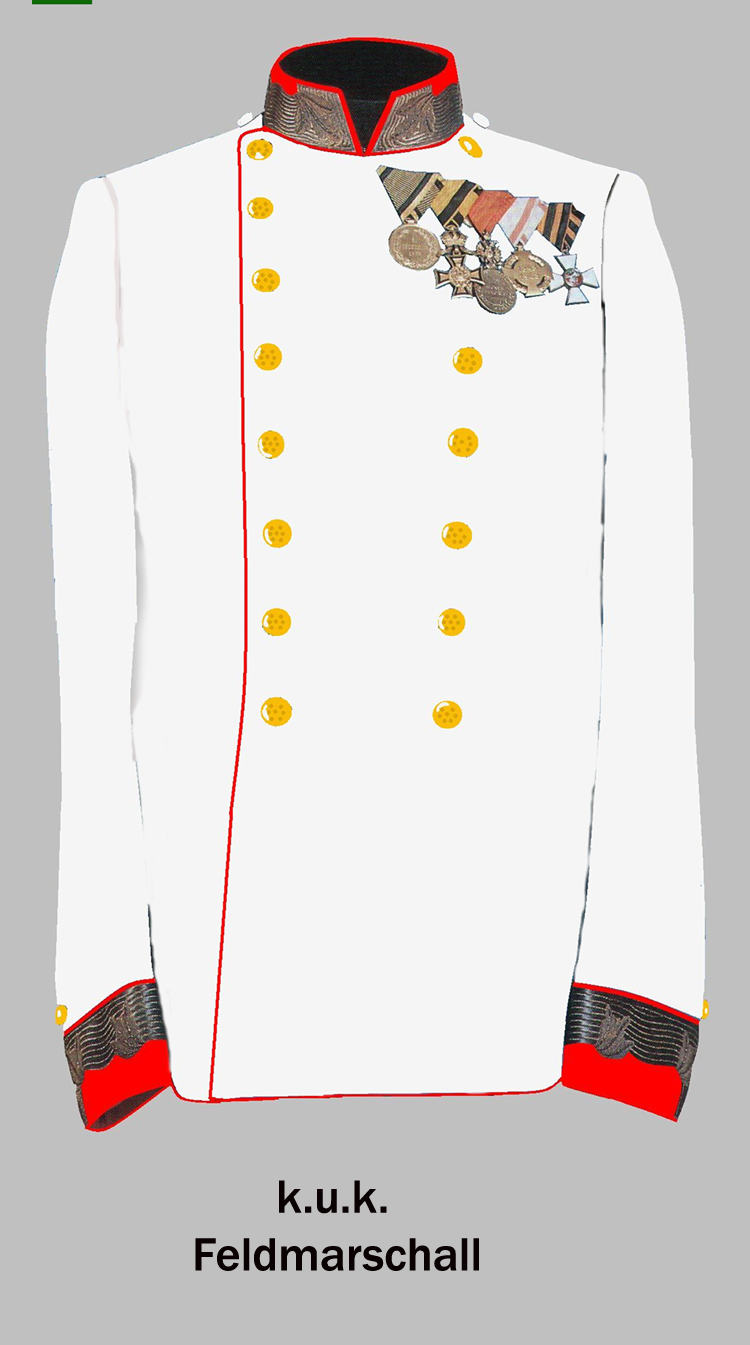
Feldmarschall of the k.u.k. Army (dress uniform)

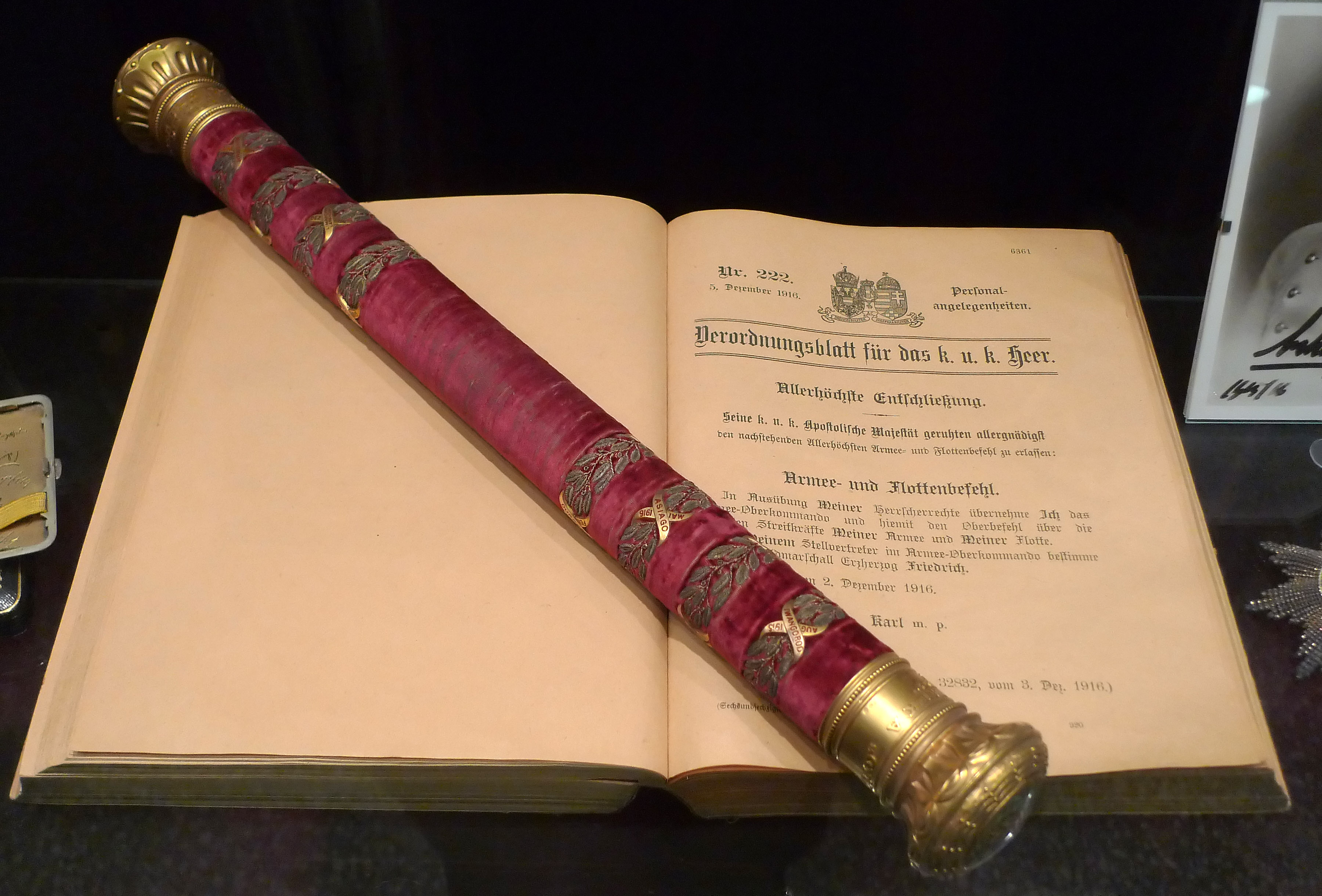
Field marshal's baton of Archduke Friedrich, Duke of Teschen at the Museum of Military History, Vienna.

The list of Austrian field marshals denotes those who held the rank of Feldmarschall in the Austrian or Austro-Hungarian armies.

== Austrian Empire ==
Appointed	Portrait	Name	Lifespan
1805		Prince Adam Czartoryski-Sangusco	1734–1823
1805		Duke Ferdinand Frederick Augustus of Württemberg	1763–1834
1808		Archduke Joseph, Palatine of Hungary	1776–1847
1808		Charles-Joseph, 7th Prince of Ligne	1735–1814
1808		Wenzel Joseph von Colloredo	1738–1822
1808		Josef Freiherr Alvinczy von Borberek	1735–1810
1808		Joseph Comte de Ferraris	1726–1814
1809		Heinrich Graf von Bellegarde	1757–1845
1809		Johann Graf von Kolowrat-Krakowsky	1748–1816
1809		Johann I Joseph, Prince of Liechtenstein	1760–1836
1812		Karl Philipp, Prince of Schwarzenberg	1771–1820
1814		William I of the Netherlands	1772–1843
1818		(United Kingdom of Great Britain and Ireland) Arthur Wellesley, 1st Duke of Wellington	1769–1852
1824		Heinrich XV, Prince Reuss of Greiz	1751–1825
1826		Camille Joseph Graf Lambertie	1746–1826
1830		Archduke Ferdinand of Austria	1793–1875
1830		Friedrich Franz Xaver, Prince of Hohenzollern-Hechingen	1757–1844
1833		Christoph von Lattermann	1753–1835
1836		Archduke Ferdinand Karl Joseph of Austria-Este	1781–1850
1836		Archduke Johann of Austria	1782–1859
1836		Josef Graf Radetzky von Radetz	1766–1858
1844		Maximilian Freiherr von Wimpffen	1770–1854
1846		Philipp Landgraf von Hessen-Homburg	1779–1846
1848		Emperor Franz Josef I of Austria	1830–1916
1848		Ignaz Freiherr von Lederer	1769–1849
1848		Alfred I, Prince of Windisch-Grätz	1787–1862
1849		Laval Graf Nugent von Westmeath	1777–1862
1850		(Russian Empire) Ivan Paskevich	1782–1856
1854		Eugen Graf Wratislaw von Mittrowítz-Nettolitzky	1786–1867
15 July 1859		Heinrich Freiherr von Heß	1788–1870
4 April 1863		Archduke Albrecht, Duke of Teschen	1817–95
19 October 1867		Edmund, Prince of Schwarzenberg	1803–73

== Austria-Hungary ==
Appointed	Portrait	Name	Lifespan
4 May 1900		(German Empire) Emperor Wilhelm II of Germany	1859–1941
1 May 1904		(United Kingdom of Great Britain and Ireland) King Edward VII of the United Kingdom	1841–1910
8 December 1914		Archduke Friedrich, Duke of Teschen	1856–1936
20 January 1916		(Tsardom of Bulgaria (1908–1946)) Ferdinand I of Bulgaria	1861–1948
21 November 1916		Emperor Karl I of Austria	1887–1922
23 November 1916		Archduke Eugen of Austria	1863–1954
25 November 1916		Franz Graf Conrad von Hötzendorf	1852–1925
5 November 1917		Hermann Freiherr Kövess von Kövessháza	1854–1924
5 November 1917		Alexander Freiherr von Krobatin	1849–1933
30 January 1918		Franz Freiherr Rohr von Denta	1854–1927
31 January 1918		Eduard Freiherr von Böhm-Ermolli	1856–1941
1 February 1918		Svetozar Boroević von Bojna	1856–1920
19 May 1918		Sultan Mehmed V of the Ottoman Empire	1844–1918
24 October 1918		Archduke Joseph of Austria	1872–1962

== See also ==
- List of German field marshals
- List of Marshals of Austria
- List of Austro-Hungarian colonel generals

== Sources ==
- Kaiserliche und k.k. Generale (1618-1815), by Dr. Antonio Schmidt-Brentano (München). Österreichisches Staatsarchiv
- Die k. k. bzw. k. u. k. Generalität 1816-1918 by Dr. Antonio Schmidt-Brentano
