= Rudolf Stöger-Steiner von Steinstätten =

Austrian-Hungarian General and Minister of War (1861-1921)

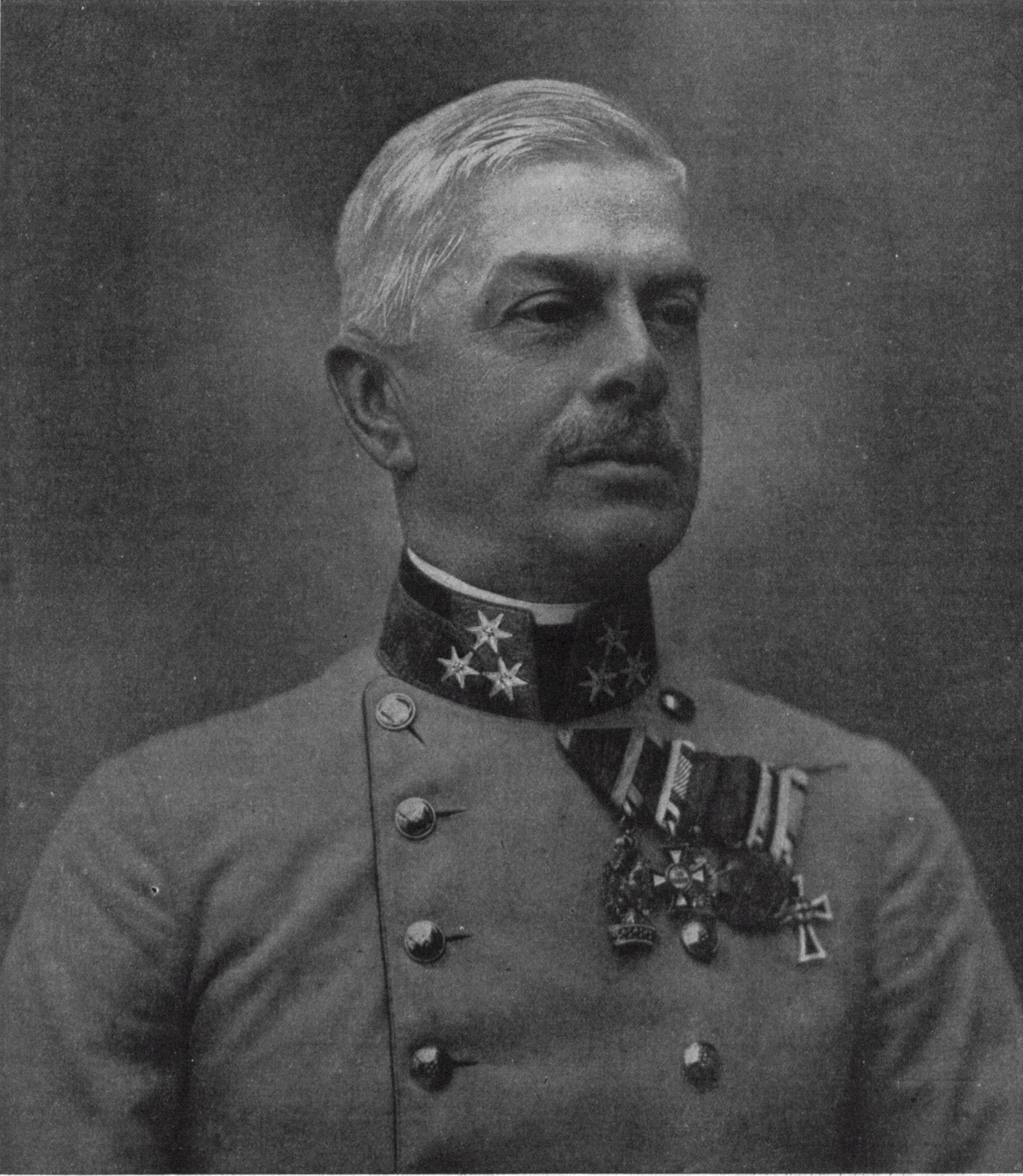
- Stöger-Steiner in 1917
- Born: 26 April 1861; Pernegg an der Mur, Austrian Empire
- Died: 12 May 1921 (aged 60); Graz, Austria
- Military career
- Allegiance: Austria-Hungary
- Branch: Austro-Hungarian Army
- Service years: 1878–1918
- Rank: Generaloberst
- Units: 4th Infantry Division; Gruppe Stöger-Steiner; XV Corps
- Commands: Galician Front; Isonzo Front
- Conflicts: Galician Campaign; Battles of the Isonzo; World War I
- Awards: Order of Leopold; Prussian Iron Cross; Golden Imtiaz Medal; Military Merit Cross; Order of the Iron Crown
- Other work: War Academy Instructor

Rudolf Stöger-Steiner Freiherr von Steinstätten (26 April 1861 – 12 May 1921) was a colonel general in the Austro-Hungarian army and served as the last Imperial Minister for War not only to the Austro-Hungarian Empire but also to the ancient Habsburg monarchy which sat at its head.

== Background and early life ==
Born as Rudolf Stöger in the village of Pernegg an der Mur, Styria, in the then Austrian Empire in 1861, Stöger-Steiner's father died when he was a young boy, leading his mother to marry a then Oberleutnant in the Austrian Army, Joseph Steiner. Stöger-Steiner's stepfather, a veteran of the Danish campaign where he had been mentioned in dispatches to the Kaiser, had a profound influence on the young man's development and encouraged him to enlist in the Army.

Joseph Steiner saw that his stepson entered service as a cadet in the 9th Feldjägerbataillon upon joining the Army so as to prevent him being sent off to active service in Bosnia as a war volunteer, but rather than join his stepfather's old unit, Stöger-Steiner was accepted into the Infantry cadet institute at Liebenau for officer's training.

Having passed through officer training school with "good effort", the young Stöger-Steiner was commissioned as a lieutenant with the 9th Feldjägerbataillon on 1 November 1880.

Accepted into the Imperial Kriegsschule in Vienna, he graduated and was appointed to the general staff with the rank of Oberleutnant in 1886 before serving in the 50th infantry brigade, the 8th mountain brigade and the 18th infantry division before being promoted to Captain in 1890.

In 1891, he was formally adopted by his stepfather and changed his name to Stöger-Steiner, which allowed him to succeed to his father's noble title, "Edler von Steinstätten". Joseph Steiner transferred his noble title and coat of arms to his son on 25 October 1892, and the same year the newly ennobled young Stöger-Steiner married Maria Link in Graz, with whom he was to have a son and daughter.

== Career ==
In the early 1890s, Stöger-Steiner held a number of staff appointments at the headquarters of a number of army corps, as well as an interval as company commander back at the 9th Feldjägerbataillon. From 1896 to 1899, he returned to serve as an instructor at the Kriegsschule in Vienna, where his efforts saw him receive promotion to the rank of Major and a command post in the 12th Infantry Regiment. For the six years between 1901 and 1907, he worked on the screening board of the Kommission zur Beurteilung der Stabsoffiziersaspiranten, which determined the suitability of persons for appointment to senior ranks in the Officer Corps. Having been promoted to the rank of Oberst in 1903, he was once again given a command role over an infantry regiment (the 74th) in 1907, and then the 56th Infantry brigade at Görz in 1909. Stöger-Steiner's next appointment to Generalmajor in 1909 saw him soon return to war-academy instruction as head of the Army School of Marksmanship (Armeeschießschule) in Bruck an der Leitha. In 1912, Stöger-Steiner received command of the 4th Infantry Division stationed at Brünn and promotion to the rank of Feldmarschall-Leutnant.

With war's outbreak following the July Crisis, and now well connected at court, Stöger-Steiner remained in command of the now mobilized fourth Infantry posted to Galicia as part of Auffenberg's Fourth Army. In Galicia, the fourth infantry took part in the Battles of Krasnik, Zamość, Komarów and the retreat to Tuckow, for which Stöger-Steiner received decorations in recognition of his initiative and outstanding leadership. In late 1914, the 4th infantry was redeployed to Kraków and attached to the First Army before being enlarged to become "Kombinierte Division Stöger-Steiner", a combined tactical force which took part in 1915's May Offensive and captured Annopol and Josefów.

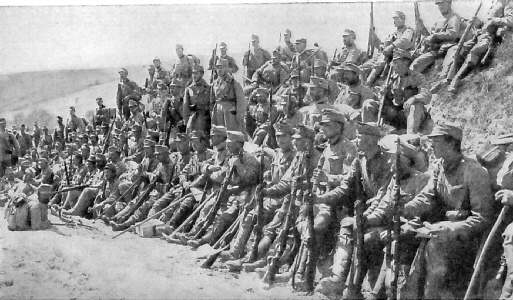
Austro-Hungarian troops rest during an advance

Transferred from the Russian front, on 26 July 1915, he took command of the newly constituted Gruppe Stöger-Steiner at the Isonzo in May 1915 only to be promoted to the command of XV Corps (also on the Isonzo) that same summer. Over the next two years, XV Corps was to take part in 8 of the 12 battles of the Isonzo, and its commander, Stöger-Steiner, was promoted to the rank of General der Infanterie in late 1915.

In 1916, as part of his evaluation of Stöger-Steiner's performance, his commander Feldzeugmeister Scheuchenstuel stated the General was:

"A versatile useful senior general with a comprehensive military education with outstanding leadership qualities. Quiet, determined, full of self confidence. Has proved his worth in difficult situations. Owing to his special qualities he is also especially suited for a senior position within the military command."

The General received a number of decorations for his role in commanding his unit on the Isonzo, and on 4 June 1916 he was honored with the title of Geheimer Rat (Privy Councillor), while in his 1917 evaluation, his now commanding officer Generaloberst Boroević agreed with Scheuchenstuel's 1916 comments and once more recommended that he be promoted to a more senior position. By this phase of the war, Stöger-Steiner's health had already begun to decline and it was felt this may have been a reason why he was recommended for a position in Military Administration as opposed to field command.

== Minister of War ==
Stöger-Steiner remained as a Corps commander on the Isonzo front until 12 April 1917, when he was recalled from front-line duties and promoted to become Imperial Minister for War. Thrust into a central and highly political role in steering the war effort, his selection was driven by divisions at court where theretofore in a relatively obscure role, he emerged as a compromise candidate suitable to the new Emperor who sought to appoint his ministers from the ranks of "persons not previously involved in any politics".

The role into which he had been appointed had diminished much in terms of power as Armeeoberkommando (Military High Command) became more powerful in politics and Emperor Karl tinkered with Parliamentary politics despite the war situation, while powerful Hungarian politicians also attempted to split the common army into two wholly separate entities.

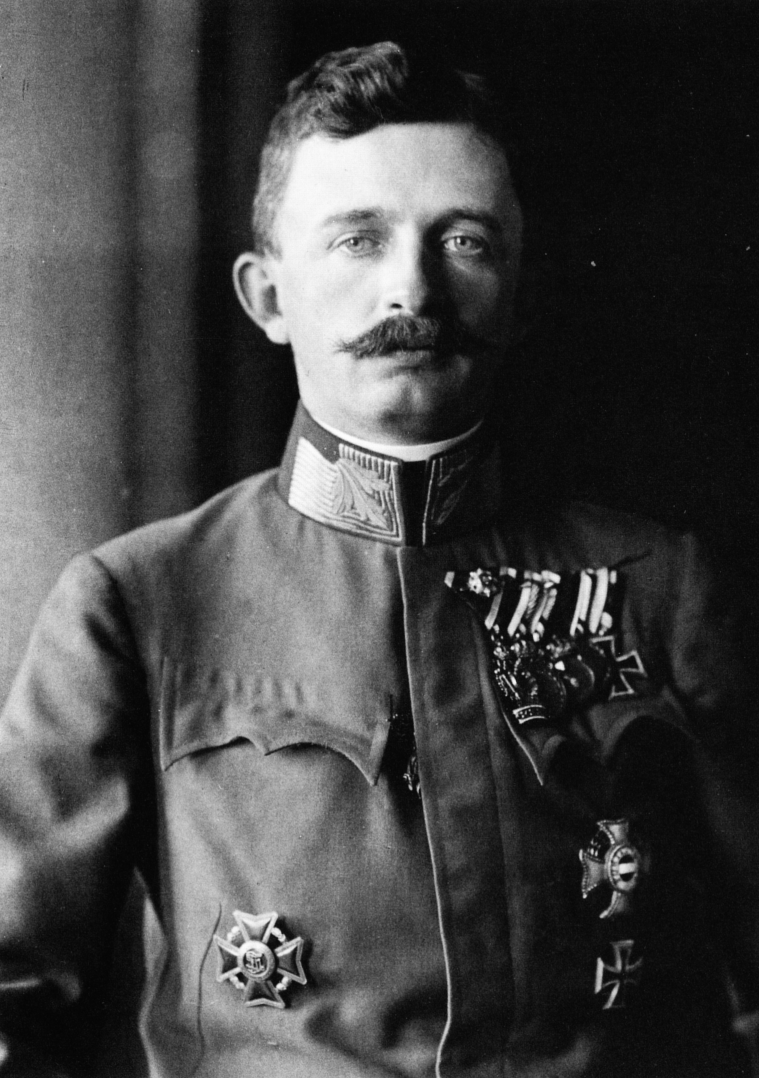
Karl I, Emperor since late 1916

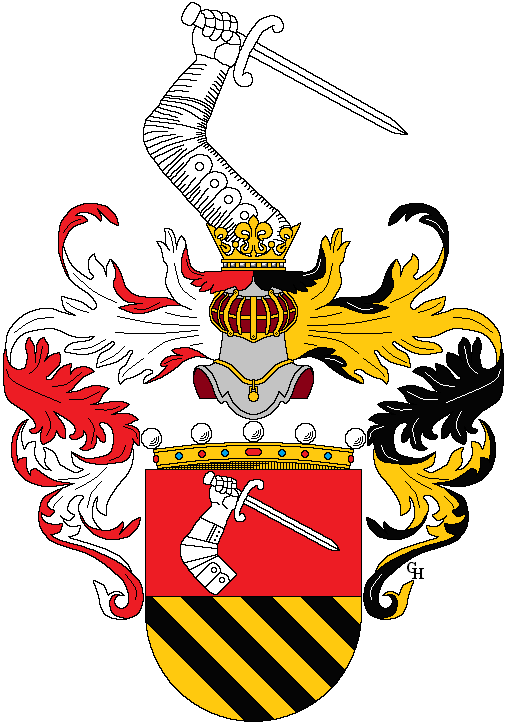
Stöger-Steiner von Steinstätten's baronial arms, granted in 1918

Energetically, Stöger-Steiner set about his task and reorganized the ministry with the creation of operationally independent offices such as the Zentraltransportleitung, (central transport department) the Kriegsüberwachungsamt (war supervisory office), the Kriegsfürsorgeamt (war welfare office), the Zentralevidenz (central intelligence) and Generalinspektorat für das Heimkehrerwesen (general inspectorate for repatriated POW's), as well as introducing new officers into the departments he created. Generally held to be highly competent, he was again decorated for his work in the War Office, where he assured the Emperor that Austria Hungary would not suffer the same fate as that of Russia in the winter of 1917, while he faced the same problems as von Krobatin of ensuring continued supplies of food and arms in the face of mounting war fatigue and the need to retain law and order among the populace.

In political matters, Stöger-Steiner's extensive military training served him poorly for facing professional politicians often with conflicting interests in the Ministerrat (ministerial council) and the Reichsrat (parliament) while he battled deteriorating health. He often considered retiring from his position, especially given that he felt Hungarian politicians tried constantly to thwart his efforts, but Stöger-Steiner's oath to the Kaiser left him to consider that he had no choice but to continue working. In April 1918, he was granted the noble title of "Freiherr", in an upgrading of his former title. While promoted to the new rank of Colonel-General, he had become convinced of the inevitability of defeat by the beginning of 1918 and was forced to withdraw some seven front-line divisions to maintain internal order in the early part of 1918.

Through the course of 1918, the situation deteriorated further as ration increases to the army could not prove possible and interruptions to supply of foodstuffs to the cities of industrial Austria led to increasing strikes, which only served to further undermine war production.

On 30 October 1918, as Stöger-Steiner traveled to the last meeting of the Ministerial Council of the Empire, a mob surrounded his car, smashed its windows, tore off the passenger's headgear and ripped off the Royal Cockade - an act not directed against him but symptomatic of the decline of law and order in the Imperial capital itself in the last days of the empire.

== Retirement ==
As the situation deteriorated throughout autumn 1918 and government authority waned in the face of events, with revolution sweeping across the Habsburg lands and the failure of an attempt to bring about an orderly demobilization, his position technically ceased to exist in early November 1918, following Hungary's dissolving the Austro-Hungarian union and the Emperor's giving up absolute authority over his realms. While the Imperial Government largely ceased to exist by mid-November, Karl sent a handwritten message to Stöger-Steiner, ordering him to continue in his post and supervise further demobilization of the Military. He was finally forced to retire by the authorities of the new Austrian Republic on 1 December 1918, over two weeks following Karl's abdication. Generaloberst Rudolf Freiherr Stöger-Steiner von Steinstätten retired into private life to Graz and continued to battle the illness which had haunted him since the early days of the war. He died in Graz on 12 May 1921.

== Service record ==
Cadet, 1878
Leutnant, 1880
Oberleutnant, 1886
Hauptmann, 1890
Major, 1899
Oberstleutnant, ?
Oberst, 1903
Generalmajor, 1909
Feldmarschall-Leutnant, 1912
General der Infanterie, 1915
Generaloberst, 1918

== Selected awards and decorations ==
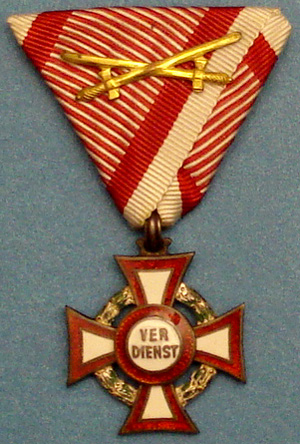
Military Merit Cross

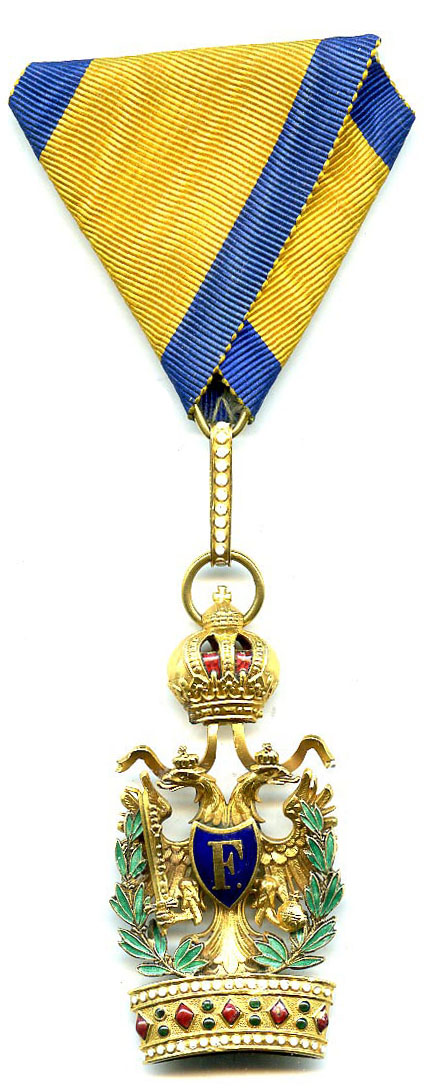
Order of the Iron Crown

Austria-Hungary

- Military Merit Cross, 2nd class (1899)
- Order of the Iron Crown, 3rd class (1906)
- Knight's Cross of the Order of Leopold (1912)
- Military Merit Cross, 2nd class with war decoration (1915)
- Grand Cross of the Order of the Iron Crown with war decoration (1916)
- Merit decoration of the Society of the Red Cross, 1st class with war decoration (1917)
- Order of Leopold, Grand Cross with war decoration and swords (1917)
- Swords for all previously given Austro-Hungarian orders with war decoration (1917)
- Military Merit Medal (Signum Laudis) (1917)
- Decoration for Services to the Red Cross with war decoration (1917)
- Marian Cross (Marianerkreutz)
- Officers Medal for 50 years of military service
- Military Medal for the 50th year of the reign
- Military Cross for the 60th year of the reign

Germany

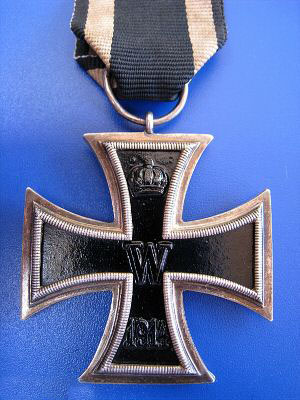
World War I Iron Cross, 2nd Class

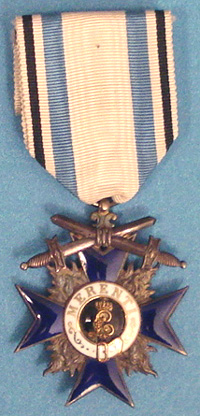
The Bavarian Military Merit Order

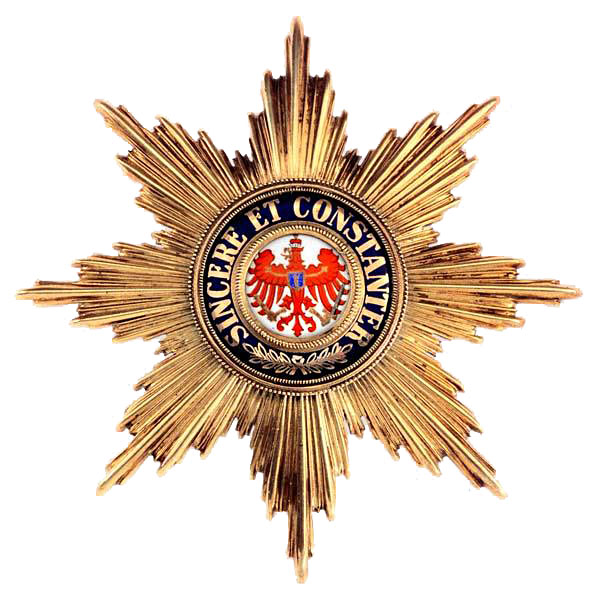
Grand Cross of the Order of the Red Eagle

- Grand Cross of the Military Merit Order with swords (Bavaria)
- Prussian Iron Cross, 2nd class (1915) and 1st class (1917)
- Order of the Red Eagle, 1st class with swords (Prussia)
- War Merit Cross (Lippe, 1917)
- Grand Cross with Swords of the Order of Albrecht (Saxony)
- Grand Cross with Swords of the Order of the Crown (Württemberg)
- Loyal Service Cross (Schaumburg-Lippe)

Other

- Order of the Cross of Takovo, 5th class (Serbia, 1887)
- Order of the Lion and the Sun, 4th class (Persia, 1890)
- Commander's Cross of the Order of the Star of Romania (1910)
- Commander's Cross with Star of the Order of the Star of Romania (1911)
- Order of the Double Dragon, 2nd grade of the 2nd class (Chinese Empire, 1911)
- Order of Osmanieh, 2nd class (Ottoman Empire, 1913)
- Golden Imtiaz Medal (Ottoman Empire, 1917)
- Gallipoli Star or "Iron Crescent", (Ottoman Empire)
- Knight Grand Cross of Magistral Grace of the Sovereign Military Order of Malta
- Order of the Red Banner RSFSR

== Other honours ==
- Appointed Privy Counsellor to the Emperor, 4 June 1916
- Elevated to Freiherr (Baron), 28 April 1918
- It has been claimed that Stöger-Steiner would have received the Military Order of Maria Theresa, Imperial Austria's highest military decoration for his actions in 1914, and in engaging the 4th infantry in the battle of Krasnik in particular had he submitted a claim and not died so soon after the war.

Military offices
Preceded by Alexander von Krobatin	Imperial & Royal Minister for War; 1917–1918	Succeeded by Position Abolished
