= Blasius von Schemua =

Austro-Hungarian military officer

General Blasius von Schemua
- Slovene: Blaž Žemva
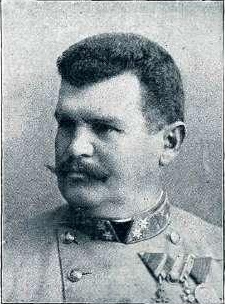
- Schemua in 1912
- Born: January 2, 1856; Klagenfurt, Austrian Empire (now Austria)
- Died: November 21, 1920 (aged 64); Klagenfurt, First Austrian Republic
- Education: Theresian Military Academy
- Military career
- Allegiance: Austria-Hungary
- Branch: Austro-Hungarian Army
- Service years: 1874–1915
- Rank: General of the Infantry
- Commands: Austro-Hungarian General Staff; 16th Corps; 2nd Corps
- Conflicts: World War I: Eastern Front; Battle of Galicia; Battle of Komarów

Blasius von Schemua (Slovene: Blaž Žemva; 2 January 1856 in Klagenfurt – 21 November 1920 in Klagenfurt) was an Austro-Hungarian general of Slovene descent.

Blasius von Schemua was the son of Blaž Žemva, an army officer. He graduated from the Theresian Military Academy in Wiener Neustadt in 1874 and the Military High School in Vienna in 1884, where he was also a lecturer from 1893 to 1897.

In 1879, Schemua was a member of the Austro-Hungarian military mission in Persia for three years, during which period he gained a deep appreciation of Islam. In the eyes of his colleagues, his Persian experience permanently marked his character. He was a Darwinist and a member of the occultist New Templar Order of Lanz von Liebenfels. His Templar name was Fra Gotthard.

In 1910, Schemua was responsible for nationwide mobilization in the Ministry of War. From 1911 to 1912, he was Chief of the Austro-Hungarian General Staff, the highest position in the hierarchy of the Austro-Hungarian Army. At the beginning of the Balkan Wars of 1912–13, he was appointed commander of the 16th Corps in Dubrovnik and promoted to Feldmarschalleutnant (lieutenant field marshal). In 1913, he was promoted to general of the infantry. At the beginning of World War I in 1914, during the Battle of Galicia, he commanded the 2nd Corps but failed to distinguish himself at the Battle of Komarów. He was replaced by Johann von Kirchbach auf Lauterbach. He was then appointed commander of the defense of the Danube from Krems to Pressburg. In 1915, he retired at his own request.

Military offices
Preceded by Franz Conrad von Hötzendorf	Chief of the Austro-Hungarian General Staff; 3 December 1911 – 12 December 1912	Succeeded by Franz Conrad von Hötzendorf
