= Franz Rohr von Denta =

Austro-Hungarian field marshal (1854–1927)

Feldmarschall baron Franz Rohr von Denta
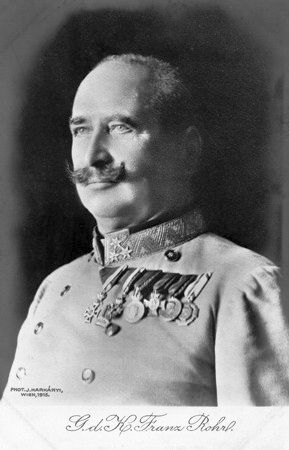

Supreme Commander of the Royal Hungarian Army
- In office 4 May 1913 – 8 August 1914
- Monarch: Franz Joseph I
- Preceded by: Wilhelm Klobučar
- Succeeded by: Office abolished

Personal details
- Born: October 30, 1854 Arad, Kingdom of Hungary, Austrian Empire (today Arad, Romania)
- Died: December 9, 1927 (aged 73) Vienna, Austria
- Resting place: Cemetery Rodaun, Vienna
- Education: Theresian Military Academy k.u.k. Staff College

Military service
- Allegiance: Austrian Empire; Austria-Hungary
- Branch/service: Army
- Years of service: 1876 – 1918
- Rank: Field Marshal
- Commands: Army Group Rohr; 10th Army; 11th Army; 1st Army
- Battles/wars: World War I: Battle of Isonzo; Tirol Offensive; Kerensky Offensive; Eastern Front
- Awards: Order of Leopold; Order of the Iron Crown; Military Merit Cross

Franz Freiherr Rohr von Denta (30 October 1854 – 9 December 1927) was an Austro-Hungarian field marshal and field commander who served as the last commander of the Austro-Hungarian First Army.

== Early life ==
Born in Arad, Kingdom of Hungary, Austrian Empire (modern-day Romania), in 1854 as Franz Denta, son of an army NCO, he became a lieutenant in the 3 Galizisches Uhlanen-Regiment Erzherzog Carl in 1876 upon graduating from the Theresian Military Academy in Wiener-Neustadt. He later attended the Austrian War College. Having attained the rank of Colonel, he was appointed Chief of Staff of II Corps in September 1897, a position in which he served until April 1901. By 1903 Denta was commanding the 73 Landwehr-Brigade at Pressburg/Pozsony (modern-day Bratislava) and in 1909 was made General Inspector of military educational establishments. In 1911 he was promoted to the rank of General der Kavallerie and appointed commander of the Hungarian Landwehr (Honved) in 1913.

== War service ==
Responsible for the task of defending the southwestern frontier and historic heartlands of the Empire following the Italian declaration of war on May 23, 1915, Rohr was appointed commander of Armeegruppe Rohr on May 27 and took charge of all troops from Graz to Innsbruck.

Having overseen the successful defense of the Carinthian frontier, Rohr was promoted to the rank of Generaloberst on January 1, 1916, and made commander of the new 10th Army following the dissolution of his army-group in anticipation of the Tyrol Offensive. With the halting of all offensive operations on the Italian front by the Imperial army in the face of the Brusilov Offensive, the Tyrol effort was prematurely brought to an end and Rohr was transferred to command the 11th Army, also in the Trento district in June 1916.

In February 1917, and with the promotion of Gen. Arz von Straussenberg to the position of Chief of the General Staff, Rohr took charge of the 1st Army and for the first time served as a commander on the Eastern Front. On April 14, 1917, he was elevated to the nobility, taking the rank of Baron and the title Rohr von Denta.

Promoted to the position of Field Marshal on January 30, 1918, Rohr continued in command of the 1st Army until its disbandment following peace with Romania on April 15, 1918.

== Retirement ==
Retiring from command at war's end, Rohr was nevertheless appointed Field Marshal in the army of newly independent Hungary. Freiherr Rohr von Denta died in the village of Rodaun, near Vienna, on 9 December 1927.

== Honours and decorations ==
- Military Service Cross 1st Class
- Grand Cross of the Order of Leopold
- Knights' Cross 1st Class of the Order of the Iron Crown
- Captain of the Hungarian Trabantenleibgarde (Life Guards)

== Selected Service Record ==
- 1876 Lieutenant (3.Galizisches Uhlanen-Regiment Erzherzog Carl)
- 1896 Colonel (General Staff)
- 1903 Major General (73.Landwehr-IBrig. at Preßburg)
- 1909 General Inspector of military educational establishments
- 1911 General der Kavallerie
- 1916 Generaloberst
- 1918 Feldmarschall

== See also ==
- Arthur Arz von Straußenburg
