= Alexander von Krobatin =

Austrian field marshal during World War I

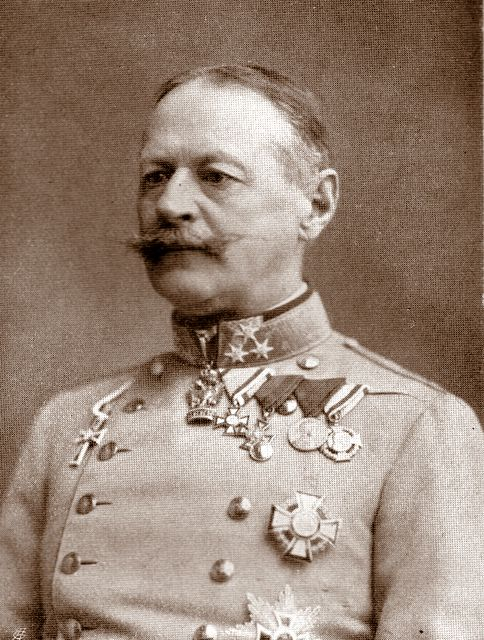
- Krobatin in 1914
- Born: 12 September 1849; Olomouc, Moravia, Austrian Empire
- Died: 28 September 1933 (aged 84); Vienna, Austria
- Military career
- Allegiance: Austrian Empire; Austria-Hungary
- Branch: Army
- Service years: 1861 – 1918
- Rank: Field Marshal
- Unit: Tenth Army
- Commands: Tenth Army; Eleventh Army; Tyrol Front
- Conflicts: Caporetto; Vittorio Veneto; Piave Offensive
- Other work: Imperial and Royal Technical Military Academy instructor

Alexander Freiherr von Krobatin (12 September 1849 – 28 September 1933) was an Austrian field marshal and Imperial and Royal Minister of War for Austria-Hungary between 1912 and 1917 — for most of World War I.

== Early life and education ==
Born in Olmütz (Olomouc), Moravia, Krobatin entered the Austro-Hungarian Army as a cadet in 1861 and moved on to attend the Artillery Academy in 1865, from which he graduated in 1869 as a Leutnant. He undertook the upper course of artillery from 1871 to 1873, at the end of which he entered service in the Military Committee with the rank of Oberleutnant. Between 1874 and 1876 he studied and attended lectures on chemistry and chemical engineering at the Technical University of Vienna, becoming head of the chemistry laboratory at the Military Technical Committee in 1877. He served as a chemistry and chemical engineering instructor at the Imperial and Royal Technical Military Academy from 1877 to 1882 and recognized as an expert in munitions, he was appointed to the War Ministry in 1896 where he successful worked as a head of department and as chief of a section while also promoted to the rank of Major General in 1900.

== Imperial War Minister ==
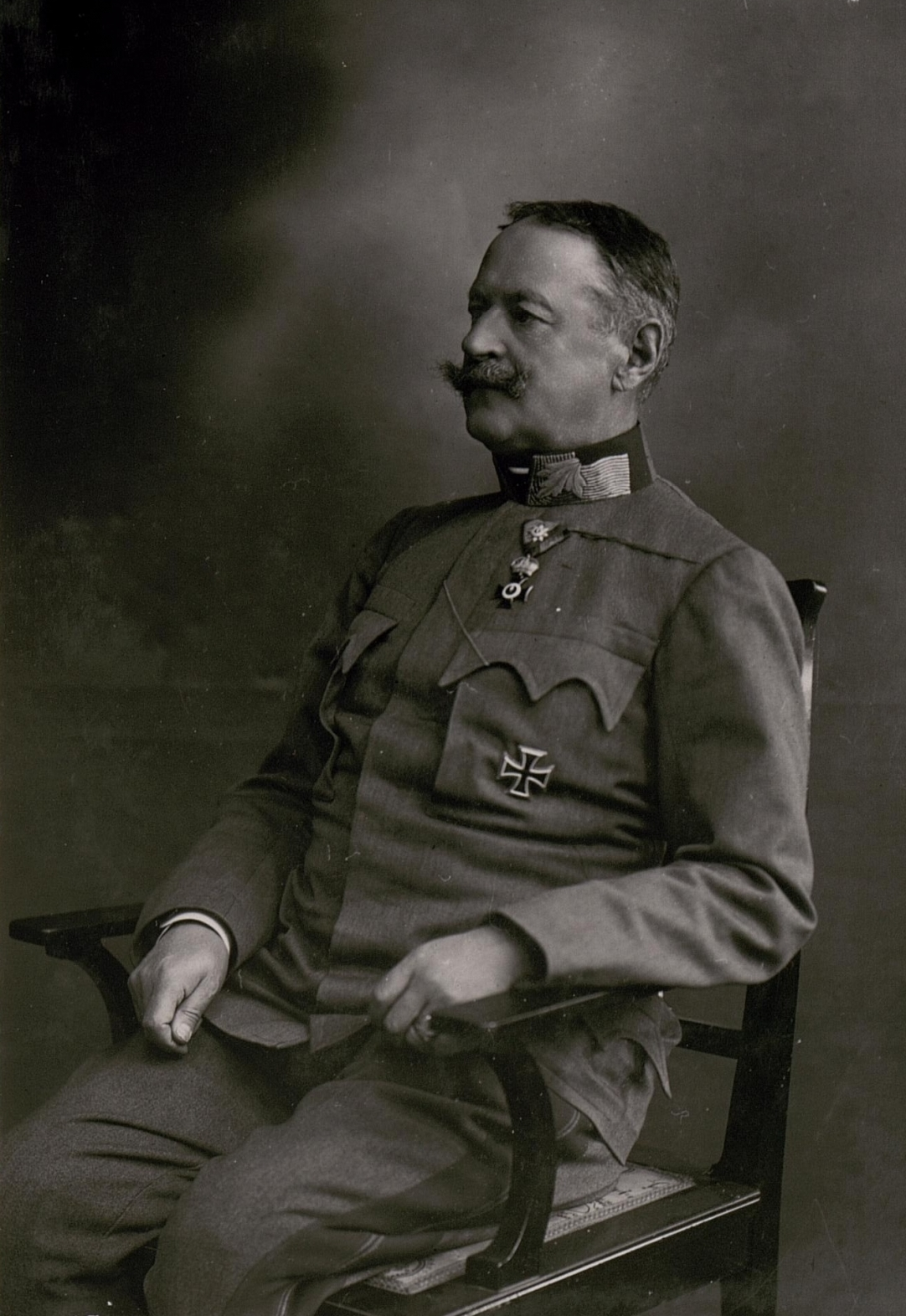
Krobatin during the First World War

A close associate of the army chief of staff Conrad von Hötzendorf, Krobatin was appointed Imperial and Royal Minister for War on 12 December 1912 and as an integral member of the "war party" gave his full backing to the hawkish element in the military in their calls for an immediate attack on Serbia following the Assassination of Archduke Franz Ferdinand on 28 June 1914 and the July Ultimatum. With the outbreak of the First World War, Krobatin was responsible for the task of harnessing the economies of industrial Austria and agrarian Hungary to ensure the now mobilised military was supplied with vital arms and munitions as well as increasing industrial efficiency to meet the needs of a state with a large cohort of its industrial population no longer available for industrial and food production given their enlistment for war. According to a number of sources, Krobatin struggled in his task for the first two years of the war, and although he never really harnessed the economy efficiently, he succeeded in tripling the level of artillery available at divisional level.

One of the first commanders to be raised to the newly created rank of Generaloberst in February 1916, Krobatin was responsible for dealing with the crisis caused by Romania's entry into the war on the side of the Entente and the sudden cutting off of resources (particularly grain and petroleum) that Romania's declaration of war brought. In the Crown council on 9 September 1916, Krobatin sought backing for a proposal which would have allowed the army unrestricted powers to seize foodstuffs and punish hoarders, but this was vetoed by Austrian chancellor Karl Stürgkh and Hungarian premier Istvan Tisza. Though occupied Serbia eventually produced more grain than Romania, food supplies to soldiers in the field remained a persistent and crucial worry to those at the higher echelons of the War Ministry.

== Field commander ==
With Conrad von Hötzendorf's dismissal in March 1917, Krobatin was left isolated in the Crown Council and he was relieved of his tenure over the war ministry in April to be handed command of the Tenth army. It was as a field commander that Krobatin was most successful. Following his role at the Battle of Caporetto in October 1917, during which his force captured two Italian divisions, he was promoted to field marshal on 5 November 1917. Redeployed to form part of Archduke Josef's strike force in Tyrol, Krobatin was given command of the entire Tyrol sector following the failure of the Piave Offensive and the Archduke's flight from the front in the face of mutinies on 26 October 1918.

== Retirement ==
Following the rejection of his offer of an armistice to the Italians on 31 October, the battered remains of his armies were overrun at Vittorio Veneto a few days later.

Krobatin retired immediately after the close of the war and was never again to hold a commission. He was an Honorary Doctor of Technical Science at the Vienna Technical Institute, honorary president of the Kaiser Karl War Welfare Fund, and an honorary member of the "Viribus Unitis" Vienna Riding Association. Krobatin died in Vienna in 1933.

== Service record ==
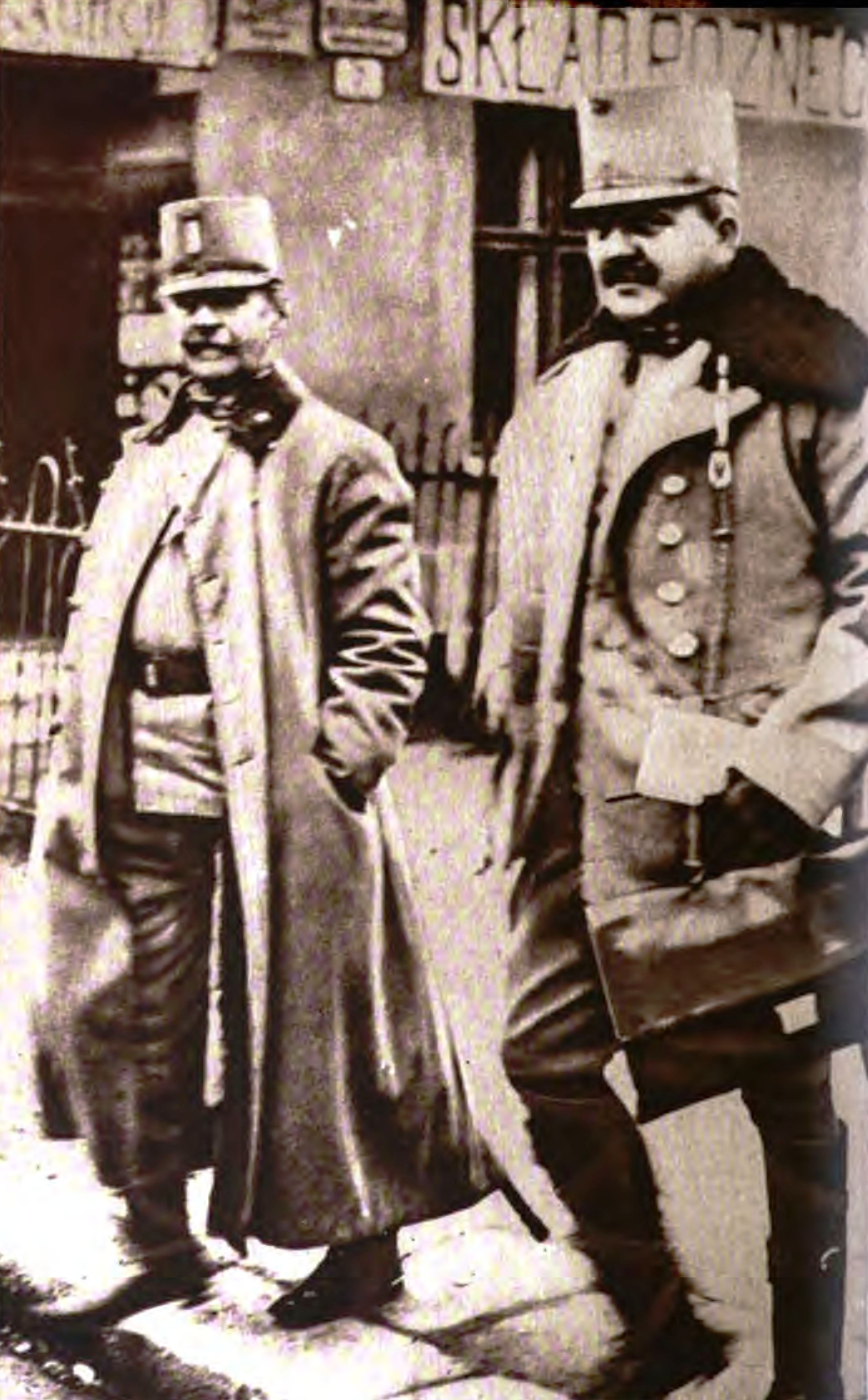
von Krobatin (left) in 1915

- 1865 - Attends Artillerieakademie until 1869
- 1869 - Promoted to Leutnant
- 1873 - Promoted to Oberleutnant
- 1879 - Promoted to Hauptmann 2. Kl.
- 1882 - Promoted to Hauptmann 1. Kl.
- 1877 - Attends the Technisch Militarisch Akademie until 1885
- 1885 - Truppendienst until 1890
- 1889 - Promoted to Major
- 1890 - Head of the Artillery Kadett Schule until 1895
- 1892 - Promoted to Oberstleutnant
- 1895 - Promoted to Oberst
- 1895 - Commander of Korps Artillery Regiment 1
- 1896 - Head of 7. Section of the RKM until 1904
- 1900 - Promoted to Generalmajor
- 1904 - Sections Chief im RKM until 1912
- 1905 - Promoted to Feldmarschalleutnant
- 1910 - Promoted to Feldzeugmeister
- 1912 - k.u.k Minister of war until April 1917
- 1916 - Promoted to Generaloberst
- 1917 - Commands X. Army until October 1918
- 1917 - Promoted to Feldmarschall
- 1918 - Commands Heeresgruppe Tirol until November 1918

Military offices
Preceded by Moritz Ritter Auffenberg von Komarów	Imperial & Royal Minister for War; 1912–1917	Succeeded by Rudolf Stöger-Steiner Edler von Steinstätten
