= Second Battle of the Piave River =

World War I battle won by Italy

Battle of the Piave River
- Part of the Italian Front (World War I)
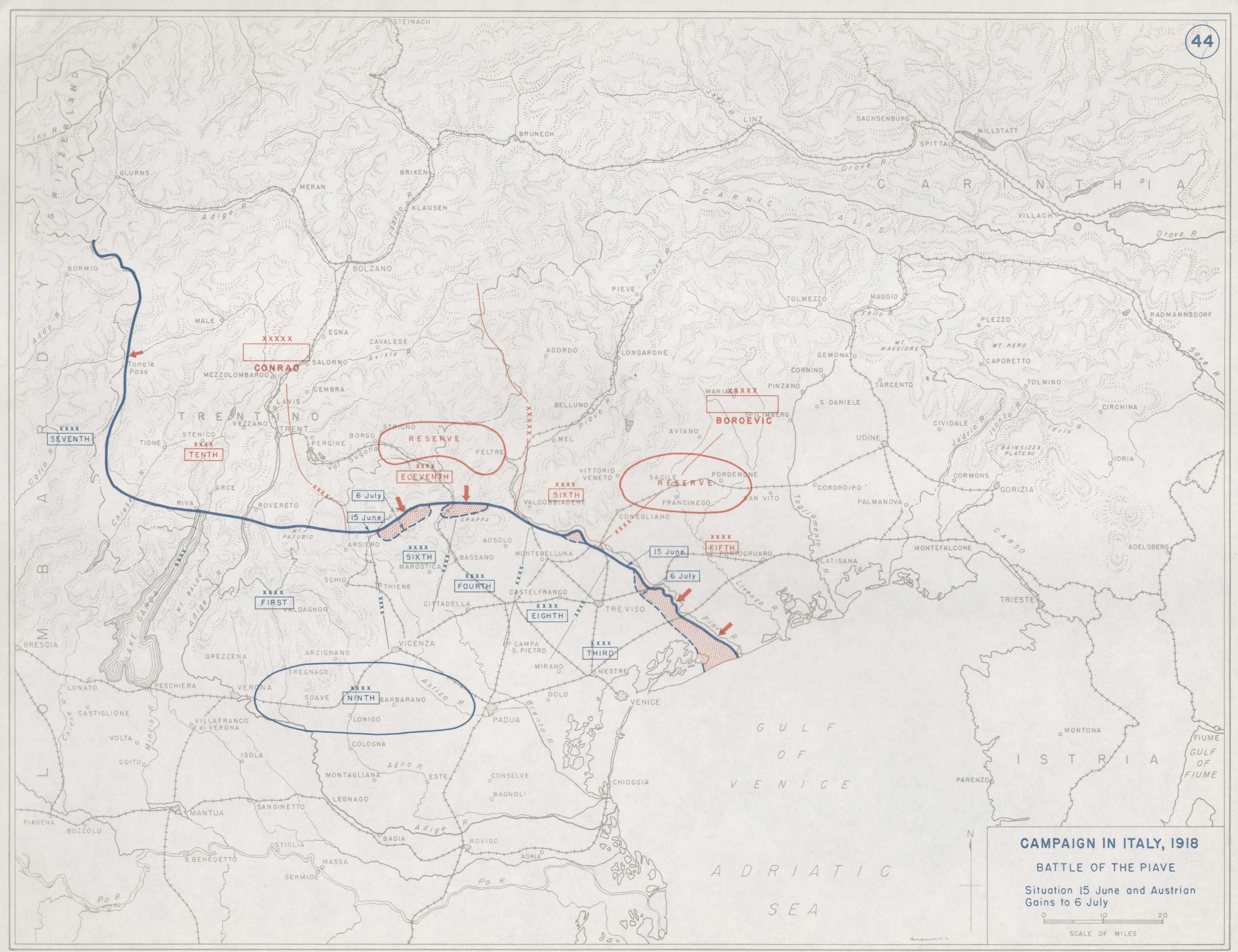
- Map of the Second Battle of the Piave River
Date	15–23 June 1918
Location	Piave, Italy 45°49′50″N 12°12′34″E
Result	Italian victory

Belligerents
Italy; United Kingdom; France; United States	Austria-Hungary

Commanders and leaders
(Kingdom of Italy) Armando Diaz	(Austria-Hungary) Arthur Arz von Straußenburg (Austria-Hungary) Svetozar Boroević (Austria-Hungary) Conrad von Hötzendorf

Strength
c. 965,000 personnel; (Kingdom of Italy) 900,000 personnel; 12,500 personnel; (United Kingdom of Great Britain and Ireland) 40,000 personnel; (French Third Republic) 25,000 personnel; 5,650 guns; 1,570 mortars; 676 aircraft	(Austria-Hungary) 946,000 personnel 6,833 artillery pieces

Casualties and losses
87,181: 8,396 dead 30,603 wounded 48,182 captured	118,042: 11,643 dead 80,852 wounded 25,547 captured

The Second Battle of the Piave River (or Battle of the Solstice), fought between 15 and 23 June 1918, was a decisive victory for the Italian Army against the Austro-Hungarian Empire during World War I, as Italy was part of the Allied Forces, while Austria-Hungary was part of the Central Powers. Though the battle proved to be a decisive blow to the Austro-Hungarian Empire and by extension the Central Powers, its full significance was not initially appreciated in Italy. Yet Erich Ludendorff, on hearing the news, is reported to have said he 'had the sensation of defeat for the first time'. It would later become clear that the battle was in fact the beginning of the end of the Austro-Hungarian Empire.

== Background ==
With the exit of Russia from the war in 1917 (after the October Revolution), Austria-Hungary was now able to devote significant forces to the Italian Front and the German Empire was able to send reinforcements to their allies. The Austro-Hungarian emperor Karl reached an agreement with the Germans to undertake a new offensive against Italy, a move supported by both the chief of the general staff Arthur Arz von Straußenburg and the commander of the South Tyrolean Army Group Conrad von Hötzendorf. In the autumn of 1917, the Germans and Austro-Hungarians defeated the Italians at the Battle of Caporetto. After Caporetto, the Italians fell back to the Piave river and were reinforced by six French infantry divisions and five British infantry divisions as well as sizeable air contingents.

=== Prelude ===
Italy's defeat at Caporetto led to General Luigi Cadorna's dismissal and General Armando Diaz's replacement of him as Chief of Staff of the Italian Army. Diaz set up a strong defense line along the Piave. Up until this point in the war, the Italian army had been fighting alone against the Central Powers. After the defeat at Caporetto, France and Britain sent reinforcements on the Italian front. These, besides accounting for less than a tenth of the Italian forces in theater, had however to be redirected for the major part to the Western Front as soon as the German spring offensive began on 21 March 1918.

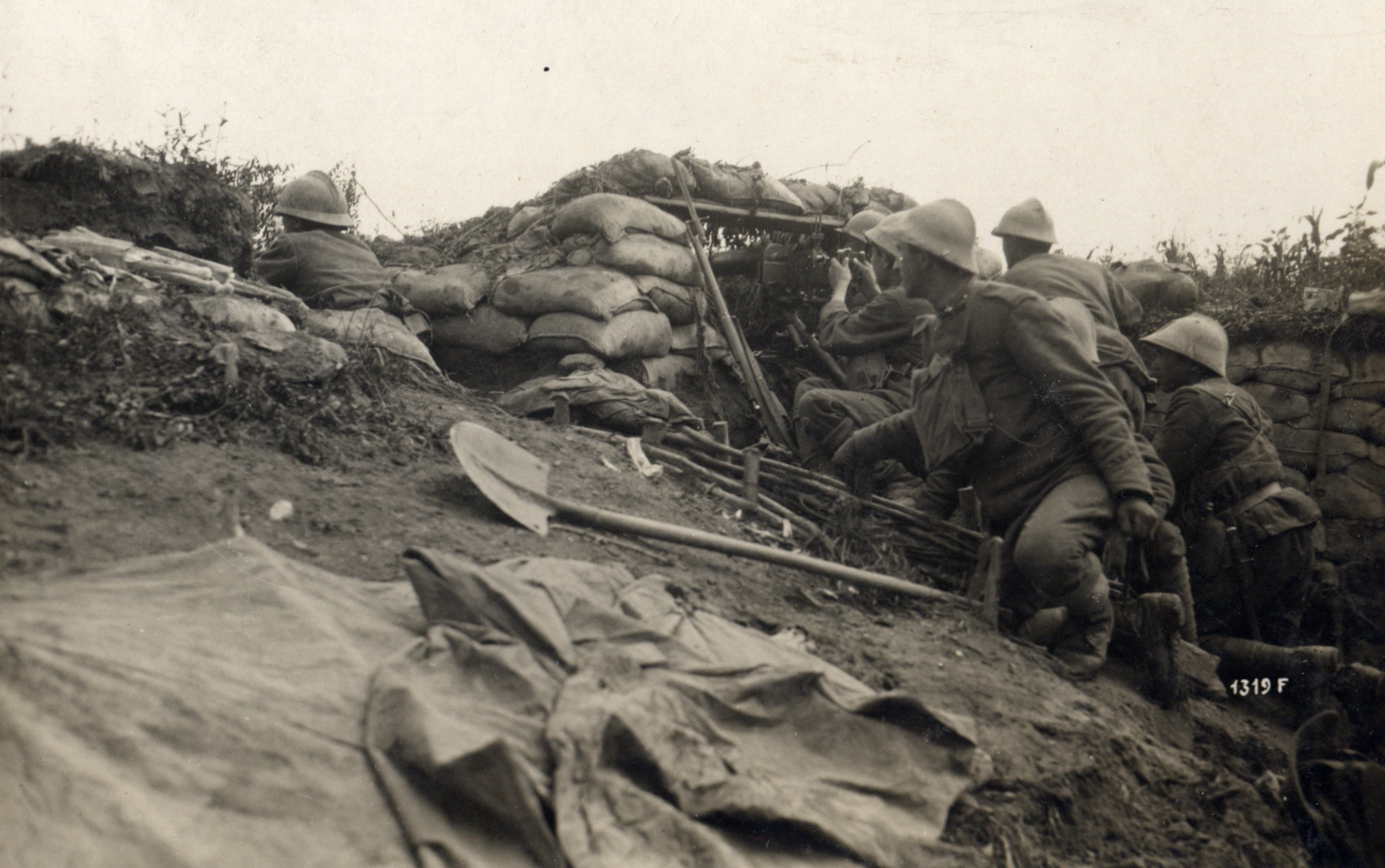
Italian troops awaiting the Austro-Hungarian attack

The Austro-Hungarian Army had also recently undergone a change in command, and the new Austro-Hungarian Chief of Staff, von Straußenburg, wished to finish off the Italians. After Caporetto, the Austro-Hungarian offensive put many Italian cities, including Venice and Verona, under the threat of the Central Powers. Austria-Hungary's army had since then longed to achieve these strategic prizes and force Italy into an armistice. In addition, the German spring offensive meant that the Austro-Hungarians had to launch a parallel offensive of their own to support their main ally against the Entente. Straußenburg's army group commanders, Conrad von Hötzendorf (the former Austro-Hungarian Chief of Staff) and Svetozar Boroević, both wished to make a decisive assault against the Italians, but could not agree on where. Conrad wanted an attack from the South Tyrolean Alps towards the Asiago Plateau and Vicenza. Boroević first favored a defensive action, but then when pressed preferred a frontal attack along the Piave River. Straußenburg himself was in favour of an attack on the western part of the front (the "Giudicarie" sector) leading to Brescia. Conrad and Boroević disliked each other, and Straußenburg and emperor Charles, unable to decide between these two strong personalities, divided the army equally between them, reserving only a small part of the forces for a diversionary action on the Giudicarie sector. The preparation of the offensive began in February 1918, after a meeting in Bolzano between the Austro-Hungarian and German high commands. It was strongly recommended by the Germans, as Ludendorff hoped that it could force the increasing American forces in France to be diverted to the Italian front, so Straußenburg modeled the attack after Erich Ludendorff's offensive on the Western Front.

The Austro-Hungarians, differently from their previous success at Caporetto in November 1917 and from the subsequent attempts to break through on Monte Grappa, did not prepare the attack as a pinpoint one, but as an all-out frontal attack, employing the entire residual strength of their army all along the front. The Austro-Hungarian formations were trained to employ the tactics developed by the Germans on the Western Front for Operation Michael, as Austro-Hungarian officers returning from the Eastern Front were extensively trained alongside their German counterparts. There were also innovations on the Italian side. Analyzing the defeat of Caporetto, the staff of Armando Diaz concluded that the main tactical causes of it were the lack of mobility of Italian units, caught in a too rigid defensive scheme, the too centralized command and control system, and the lack of depth of Italian defences, where too many soldiers were simply stuck on the frontline. The new schemes prepared for the battle led to the abolition of the continuous entrenchment and in the development of a highly mobile defence system, in which even the smaller units were allowed to freely move between previously recognized strongpoints, independently decide to retreat or counterattack, or directly call the support of the artillery. Moreover, 13 divisions, equipped with 6,000 trucks, were organized in a central reserve, ready to be sent where it was needed.

Conrad, who had been demoted from commander-in-chief after a series of disastrous failures in the Balkans and on the Eastern Front, continued in Italy the same patterns of poor planning—disregarding troop strength, terrain and weather conditions. He did, however, come to the realization that he needed more men, at least 15 infantry divisions and two of cavalry. Straussenburg and other commanders in Vienna, dealing with the consequences of nearly a million casualties from Conrad's earlier campaigns, denied his requests until early June.

=== Strategic errors of Austria-Hungary, and insufficient preparations ===
A defended river crossing provides the defender with a substantial strategic advantage, particularly when the opposing forces are of comparable strength. Under such conditions, the attacker generally requires significantly greater resources, superior logistical capacity, and exceptionally effective coordination to overcome the defender's natural advantages. The attacker must overcome the physical obstacle of the river while simultaneously establishing and maintaining crossings, securing bridgeheads, protecting vulnerable bridging equipment, and sustaining a continuous flow of reinforcements, ammunition, food, and artillery supplies across a limited number of crossing points. The defender, by contrast, can concentrate on a relatively narrow set of objectives: denying or disrupting crossings, destroying bridges, containing bridgeheads, and exploiting the attacker's logistical vulnerabilities.

A successful crossing requires not merely sufficient numerical strength but sustained and often overwhelming firepower superiority, particularly in artillery, to suppress enemy artillery, machine-gun positions, and other defensive strongpoints. Additional difficulties include destroyed infrastructure, difficult riverbanks and terrain, restricted bridge capacity, congestion, and the exposure of crossing sites and supply routes to artillery and air attacks. Maintaining this level of fire support and logistical throughput places a particularly heavy burden on the attacking force.

If the assault fails to achieve a rapid breakthrough, the imbalance becomes even more pronounced. Concentrated troops and engineering units are exposed to defensive fire while crossing equipment and bridges become vulnerable targets. Bottlenecks restrict the movement of reinforcements, ammunition, and supplies, while casualties and damaged infrastructure further reduce the attacker's operational capacity. The defender can exploit these conditions through concentrated fire and counterattacks against isolated bridgeheads.

Consequently, even forces of comparable overall strength can experience radically different rates of attrition: the attacker may exhaust its manpower, ammunition, and logistical capacity merely attempting to establish and maintain a foothold on the opposite bank, while the defender can achieve disproportionate results with fewer resources. A prolonged and unsuccessful river-crossing offensive can therefore culminate in the exhaustion of the attacking force without producing any decisive operational gain.

== Battle ==
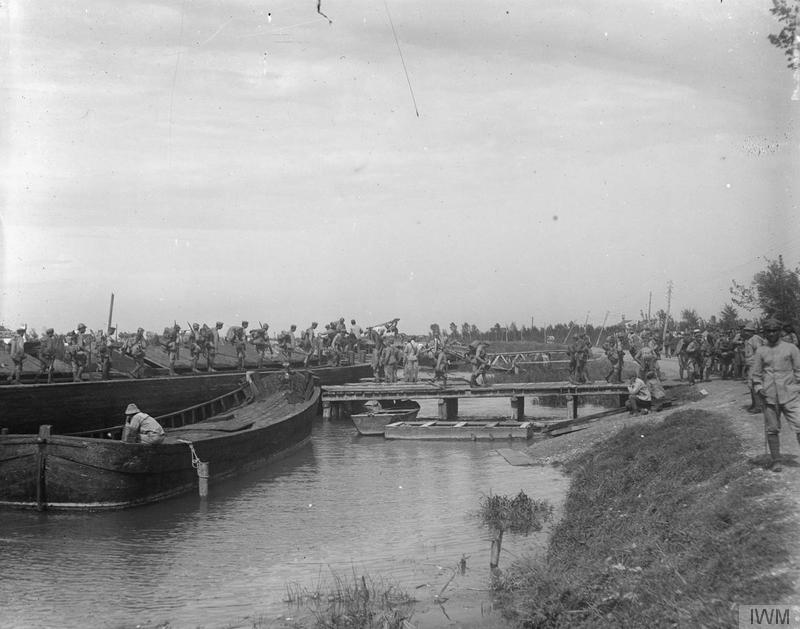
Italian Marines of the San Marco Brigade landing from barges to take up positions on the Piave Front

General Diaz learned the exact timing of the Austro-Hungarian attack: 3:00 a.m. on 15 June, so at 2:30 a.m., the Italian artillery opened fire all along their front on the crowded enemy trenches, inflicting heavy casualties. In some sectors the artillery barrage had the effect of delaying or stopping the attack, as Austro-Hungarian soldiers began to retreat to their defensive positions, believing they had to face an unexpected Italian attack, but on the greater part of the front the Austro-Hungarians still attacked as planned. Boroević launched the first assault, moving south along the Adriatic coast and in the middle course of the Piave River. The Austro-Hungarians were able to cross the Piave and gained a bridgehead 15 miles (24 km) wide and 5 miles (8 km) deep in the face of Italian heavy resistance, before Boroević was finally stopped and forced to order a retreat. The Japanese writer Harukichi Shimoi recounts:

Thick bursts all around me, very close. I saw many who died and who were wounded. I will never forget those two days. A young soldier fell wounded; a piece of shrapnel had entered his right leg, another under the right eye and another in the right ear...

On the subsequent days Boroević renewed the assault, but the artillery barrage destroyed many of the river's bridges; the Austro-Hungarian formations that had crossed the river were unable to receive reinforcement and supplies. To make matters worse, the swollen Piave isolated a great number of units on the west bank of the river, which made them an easy target for the Italian fire. It was reported that a large number of Austro-Hungarian soldiers drowned while trying to reach the east bank. On 19 June, Diaz counterattacked and hit Boroević in the flank, inflicting heavy casualties.

In the meantime Conrad attacked along the Italian lines west of Boroević on the Asiago Plateau (on 15 June), with the objective of capturing Vicenza. His forces gained some ground, but came upon stiff resistance from Italian units; the front-line troops were stationed from Mount Zovetto and Mount Lemerle to the Tre Monti ("Three Mounts"). Mount Zovetto hosted both Italian and Scottish positions, connected by underground tunnels. 40,000 casualties were added to the Austro-Hungarian total. In the aftermath, Boroević was particularly critical of the behavior of Conrad who, after the complete failure of the first attack, preferred to continue the assaults in the subsequent days but with diminished strength, rather than send reinforcements to the Piave sector.

Lacking supplies and facing attacks by armored units, the Austro-Hungarians were ordered to retreat by Emperor Karl, who had taken personal command, on 20 June. By 23 June, the Italians recaptured all lost territory on the southern bank of the Piave and the battle was over.

== Aftermath ==
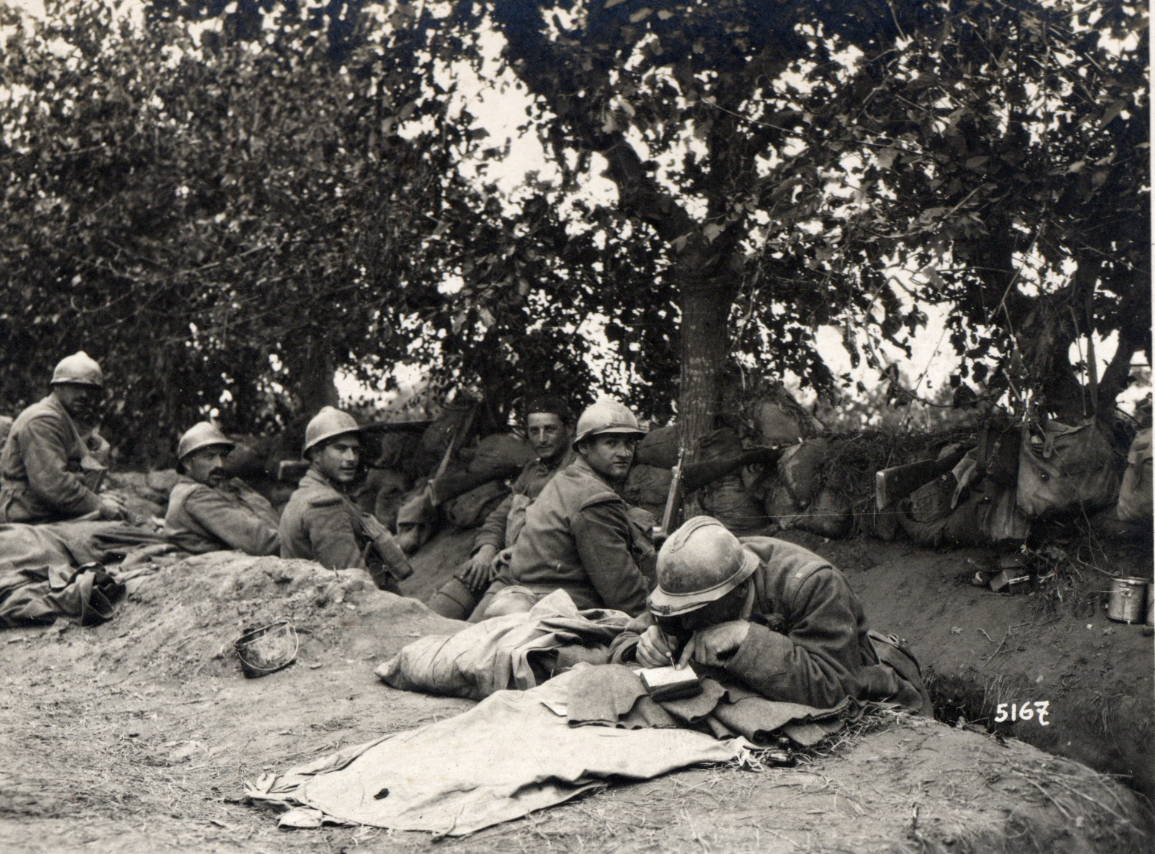
Italian troops at the end of the battle

After the Austro-Hungarian retreat, Diaz was pressed by the Allies, particularly by General Ferdinand Foch, to assault the Austro-Hungarian defences in the hope of breaking them and gaining a decisive victory over the empire. However, the Italian general recognized that the tactic which proved so effective on defence prevented an immediate offence, as the Italian formations at that time were too scattered and mixed up to be effectively coordinated in a decisive assault. Moreover, once the Italian Army crossed the river, they would have to face the same logistic problems as the Austro-Hungarians. For these reason, only limited actions were fought over the subsequent days, to gain better start positions for the decisive assault.

The Second Battle of the Piave River was Austria-Hungary's last great military offensive. A clear failure, the operation struck a major blow to the army's morale and cohesion and had political repercussions throughout the war-weary empire. The battle signaled the beginning of the end of its army as an effective fighting force and foretold the internal political collapse of the multi-ethnic Austrian-Hungarian Empire, which was finished off at the Battle of Vittorio Veneto four months later. The army offered stiff resistance for four days from 24 to 28 October during the Allied offensive, but collapsed as word reached the troops of the empire's disintegration, at which point there was little point in continuing to resist.

The battle also dealt a severe blow to the German strategy of pursuing a separate peace with Italy (and accessing resources in the affluent Po Valley) and then concentrating efforts on the Western Front to finally overcome the Allied forces. Ludendorff wrote:

This unsuccessful attack was extremely painful. I could no longer hope that relief on the Western Front might be secured in Italy itself.

Conrad was dismissed from military service entirely on 15 July, as a result of the defeat.

== Order of battle ==
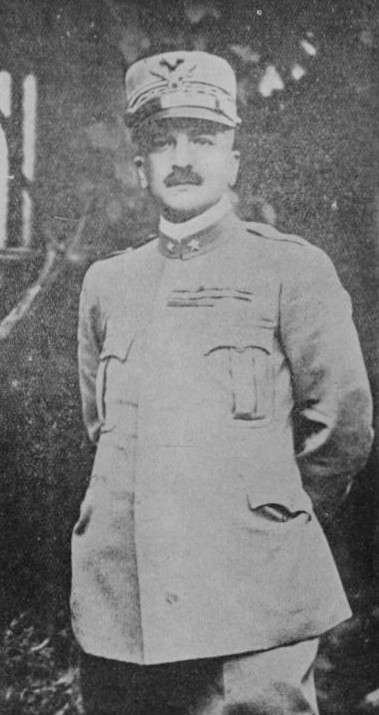
General Armando Diaz

Italy (Armando Diaz) (east to west)

- 3rd Army (Duke of Aosta)
- 8th Army (Enrico Caviglia)
- 4th Army (Gaetano Giardino)
- 6th Army (Luca Montuori)
- 1st Army (Guglielmo Pecori Giraldi)
- 7th Army (Giulio Cesare Tassoni)

In reserve:

- 9th Army (Paolo Morrone)

Austria-Hungary (Arthur Arz von Straußenburg) (east to west)

- Army Group Boroević (Svetozar Boroević)
  - 5th Army (or Isonzo Army) (Wenzel Freiherr von Wurm)
  - 6th Army (Archduke Joseph of Austria)
- Army Group Conrad (or Armygroup Tirol) (Franz Conrad von Hötzendorf)
  - 11th Army (Viktor Graf von Scheuchenstuel)
  - 10th Army (Alexander von Krobatin)

== In popular culture ==
- Today, to the Italian public two mottos recall the battle: those written as graffiti upon broken walls of destroyed rural houses: E' meglio vivere un giorno da leone che cent'anni da pecora ("[It] is better to live one single day as a lion than a hundred years as a sheep") and Tutti eroi! O il Piave o tutti accoppati ("Everyone a hero! Either (we hold) the Piave, or let all of us get killed"). The two pieces of wall are preserved in the military shrine of Fagarè della Battaglia, a frazione of San Biagio di Callalta.
- The Battle is also known as the "Battle of the Solstice", a name coined by the poet Gabriele D'Annunzio shortly thereafter. On 9 August 1918, D'Annunzio conducted his Flight over Vienna with 11 Ansaldo airplanes throwing thousands of leaflets from the sky, praising the Italian victory.
- In the shelling and firefights that occurred in July and August after the battle, an 18-year-old American ambulance driver named Ernest Hemingway was wounded. Hemingway was knocked unconscious during an Austrian mortar attack on July 8. Fragments of the shell entered his lower extremities. Two Italian soldiers standing with Hemingway were killed. In the 1932 film adaptation of Hemingway’s novel A Farewell to Arms, Frederic Henry (Gary Cooper) is wounded in the leg at this battle.
- The battle is described in Andrew Krivak's novel, The Sojourn.
- The battle is mentioned in André Aciman's novel Call Me by Your Name and its film adaptation. A scene in the film takes place overlooking a memorial to the victims of the battle, located in the city of Pandino. In the film, however, it is said that 170,000 people died in the battle.
- Pope Francis mentioned in June 2022, in an interview with the editors of a Jesuit European cultural journal, that one of his grandfathers participated in "an experience on the Piave River" during World War I, presumably referring to either the first or second Battle of the Piave River.
- The first person tactical shooter Isonzo features the maps "Piave", based on the first battle, and "Montello" and "Moschin", based on the second battle.

== See also ==
- First Battle of the Piave River
- "La Leggenda del Piave", a patriotic song written by E. A. Mario after the battle.
- Pietro Micheletti, Italian military commander fighting in the battle
- Attilio Deffenu, Italian journalist and soldier who died in the battle
