= Battle of Kraków (1914) =

World War I battle

- Part of the Eastern Front during World War I
Date	31 October–15 November [O.S. 13 November–28 November] 1914
Location	near Kraków
Result	Indecisive (Note: Victory in Carpathian, but they achieved minimal success in the battle of Krakow)
Territorial changes	Russians captured the Carpathian mountains, forced the Austrians to retreat from the Vistula to Krakow and invaded Slovakia

Belligerents
Austria-Hungary; German Empire	Russian Empire

Commanders and leaders
(Austria-Hungary) Franz Conrad von Hötzendorf (German Empire) Remus von Woyrsch (Austria-Hungary) Viktor Dankl von Krasnik (Austria-Hungary) Joseph Ferdinand (Austria-Hungary) Svetozar Boroević	Nikolai Ivanov; Platon Lechitsky; Aleksei Evert; Radko Dimitriev; Alexei Brusilov (Note: Only in Carpathian)

Units involved
(Austria-Hungary) 3rd Army (Austria-Hungary) 4th Army (Austria-Hungary) 1st Army (German Empire) Landwehr Corps	3rd Army; 9th Army; 4th Army; 8th Army

Strength
397,237 (Note: including Germans on 28 November)	363,362

Casualties and losses
>121,000 (Note: 80,000-95,000 in Battle of Krakow; ~26,000 in Carpathian)	121,000

The Battle of Krakow (Russian: Краковская Битва, romanized: Krakovskaya Bitwa); (German: Krakauer Schlacht) took place on the Eastern Front during World War I from November 16 to November 28, 1914. In western Galicia, the Russian 9th and 3rd Armies advanced to the Dunac and pushed back the Austro-Hungarian 4th Army between Krakow and the northern slopes of the Beskids. A counterattack by retreating Austro-Hungarian troops in the northern section of the Vistula was repulsed by the Russians, and then came to a standstill. As a result of the unsuccessful attacks of the German 9th Army in the decisive Battle of Lodz, the battles for Krakow were interrupted by both sides after two weeks of fighting. At the end of November, the chief of the General Staff of Austria-Hungary, Franz Conrad von Hötzendorf, hastily began to regroup for a new counteroffensive at Limanova-Lapanov to stop the Russian breakthrough in northern Hungary.

== Background ==
In October 1914, a series of battles took place, as a result of which the armies of the Central Powers were defeated, the Russians returned almost all the lands in Poland, seized part of the lands in eastern Prussia, besieged Przemysl again and wanted to launch an invasion of Silesia, for this they needed take Krakow. In October, the numerical advantage was on the side of the Austrians, but they were drained of blood, and two armies that had previously operated against the Germans returned to the disposal of the Russians. They now had almost triple the numerical superiority. The task of the Austrians was to gain time and wait for reserves, And after that, go on the offensive. To slow down the Russians, the Central Powers burned everything in the district, which led to deaths and displacement of civilians.

== First stage of battle ==
=== 16 November ===
On November 1 (14), the Russians organized a cavalry breakthrough near the city of Krzeszowice, Two days later the 4th Army crossed the Pilica River and began to move towards the German border. General Voirsch tried to launch a counterattack against these troops, but achieved only minor success and was forced to retreat. The 9th Army advanced very quickly, the Austrians literally ran away from it and did not offer any organized resistance.

=== 17 November ===
Central Powers troops put up serious resistance to the Russians, inflicting constant counterattacks and heavy losses, however, the Russians did the same, counterattacks were fought off and the Germans were forced to constantly retreat. On this day, the Austrians launched a counterattack. However, they ran into the Russian guard and fled. The Russians took 1,800 prisoners. The Austrians hoped that the next day they would be able to stop the Russians, the directive stated:

The outcome of tomorrow's attacks (November 18) by all three armies is crucial for success in the war. There is no superior opponent in front of us. The enemy is tired, he has problems with ammunition and supplies. His staff is also downsized. Everyone should be aware that lost time cannot be returned. Adamant in the opinion of all superiors, their personal contribution to the battle should bring and increase success

The Austrians received reserves, they decided to occupy the city of Skala at any cost.

=== 18 November ===
The Central Powers were preparing an offensive, and the enemy did not know about it, but the Germans were able to intercept Russian telegrams, which put Russia at a disadvantage. Voirsh's group launched a decisive offensive and achieved some success, they occupied several settlements. At the same time, the Austrian strikes were met with stubborn resistance, the maximum that the 1st Army could pass was 400 meters, the German troops acted more successfully. However, the Central Powers could not develop success, the 3rd Cavalry Corps moved back a little, but its front was not broken through. The Russians lost 4,500 prisoners, 18 machine guns and 2 guns Central Powers attacks on November 18 brought the Austrians little success, although the Russians returned some of the territories, by the end of the day there was nothing left of the numerical superiority of the Russians, now the Central Powers had the initiative.

== Second stage of battle ==
=== 19 November ===
The Germans were worried about the Russian threat, they were pulling more and more of their troops from the western front, which would later turn out to be a cancerous mistake. By November 22, it was planned to throw 12 divisions against Russians The front of the Russian 4th Army stabilized, the enemy's attacks on that day were repulsed and on November 20 it was planned to go on the offensive. Everything was worse for the 9th Army, there was a massacre near the city of Yangrota, but the enemy was able to break through only in one place, the guard hurried here and returned the positions with a short counterattack, capturing 500 prisoners.

=== 20 November ===
The Central Powers' offensive continued. Evert tried to prevent the coverage of his flanks, and acted quite successfully. Russian Russians had a difficult situation, their offensive was drowned in blood, there were limited successes only in small areas, the Russians lost 1,122 prisoners, but at the same time the Austrians suffered a heavy defeat from the 44th division of the Russians at the place of Usce-Solna. The failure of the Austrian and German attacks forces them to change their plan of action, they decided to postpone the offensive on the Vistula.

=== 21 November ===
Evert decided to continue the offensive, several counter-battles took place, the Russians pushed back the enemy and occupied the city of Yedlnya, where 1,500 were captured The front of the 9th Army could not go on the offensive, the enemy attacked everywhere, but could achieve success only on one front, the Russians backed up a little to gain time and brought the guard into battle, which eliminated the breakthrough. Font stabilized and Platon Lechinsky went on the defensive, also, units of the 3rd Army came to his front.

=== 22 November ===
Evert continued his offensive and by the end of the day was able to gain a foothold at Zakozhavsk, where he successfully defended himself. His army took 3,000 prisoners. The onslaught continued on the front of the 9th Army, it held on due to the steadfastness of the guard and reserves of the 3rd Army of Radko-Dmitriev, here the attacks of the Central Powers were repulsed. The Russians took 2,350 prisoners, however, they themselves suffered huge losses.

=== 23 November ===
This day was no different from the previous one, Evert was advancing, and Lechinsky was defending. The first was able to push back the Germans, by the end of the day, they occupied the Town of Vevets and repelled attacks. At the same time, Lechinsky conducted a raid and took 3,000 prisoners, but the Austrians advanced just as stubbornly and just as unsuccessfully.

=== 24 November ===
On this day, the plans of the German headquarters were thwarted, the Russians went on the offensive all over the front, no one was able to adequately meet them, so they were successful, only in one area the attacks were repulsed. Russians occupied Brzeznica. 9th Army I decided to push the Austrians back by cunning, they launched a false offensive with small forces in one area, where the Grokhovites held a heroic defense all day, other units outflanked the Austrians and forced the whole regiment to capitulate. 1,000 were captured The Central Powers accepted the fact of retreat, it broke all their plans to turn the tide in the battle, the Russians occupied a vast territory, but were exhausted by the battle.

=== 25-28 November ===
The attacks of the Austrians weakened every day, but the Russians also suffered heavy losses, because of this, it was decided to reduce the intensity of the fighting. The Russian 4th and 9th Armies did not have the forces to attack and therefore simply strengthened the captured positions, but limited attacks were still carried out on the positions of mainly Austrians, for example, 1,000 people were captured in the battle for hill 122. The Central Powers were retreating quickly, and the Russians did not have the strength to pursue them. However, the 3rd Army had these forces, which arrived fresh to reinforce the Allies, on November 26 it launched a decisive offensive, defeated the enemy and captured 7,000 people. The Germans switched to the tactics of stubborn defense, only the 3rd Army advanced in front, by the end of November 27, its offensive had subsided, it was very reluctant to pursue the enemy due to heavy losses. The cities of Aspen and Kamen were taken.

== Carpathian offensive ==
At the same time, Brusilov was trying to cross the Carpathian Mountains and invade Slovakia, for this he needed to capture the Lupovsky and Bexidsky crossings. The offensive began on November 12 and ended on December 2. 190,000 Russians were operating against 160,000 Austrians, but the Austrians defended themselves on inaccessible mountain passes. However, these fortifications did not prevent Brusilov from declaring the operation successfully completed. His troops lost 35,000 men KIA, WIA and MIA, Capturing only 25,000 prisoners.

== Result ==
Russian could not take Krakow, but forced the Austrians to retreat and repulsed their attacks, on the Carpathian front, the Russians achieved complete success.

== Aftermath ==
In December of this year, the Austrians gathered their forces and launched an offensive, they did not achieve final success, but the Russians were pushed back from Krakow. However, they still retained some positions in the Carpathian passes.
