= Viktor Graf von Scheuchenstuel =

Austro-Hungarian army officer (1857-1938)

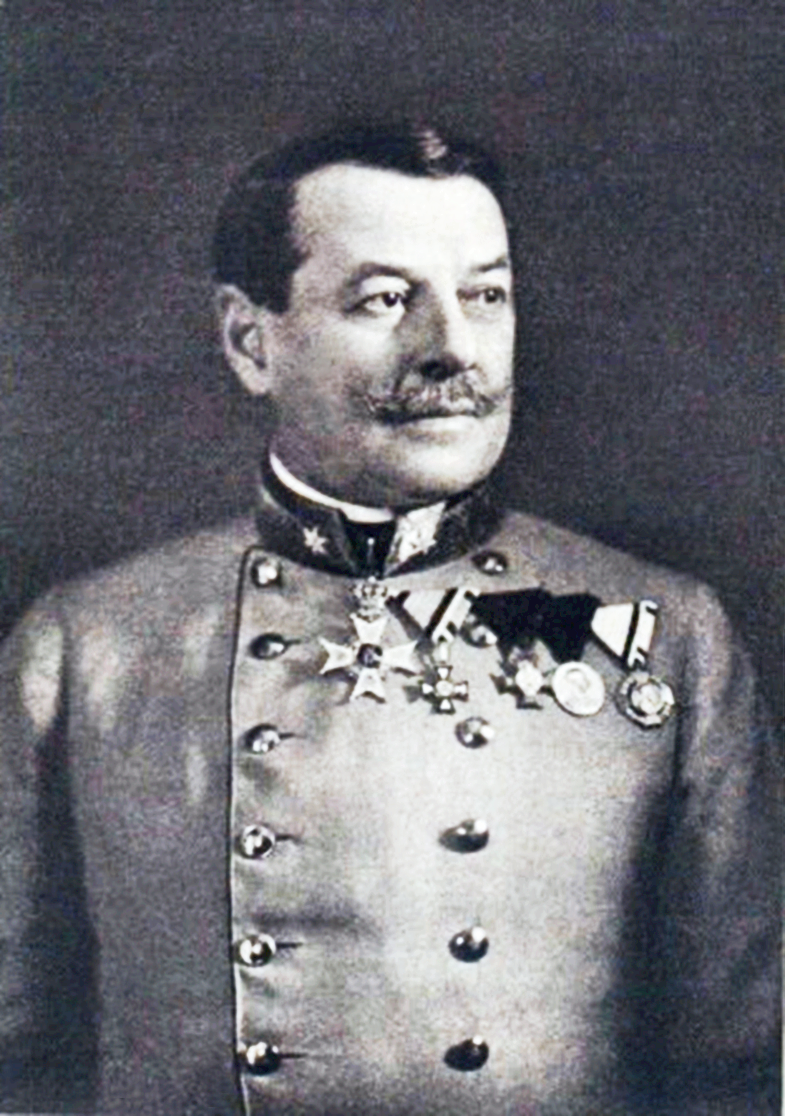
- Scheuchenstuel in 1916
- Born: 10 May 1857; Witkowitz, Moravia, Austrian Empire
- Died: 17 April 1938 (aged 80); Vienna, First Austrian Republic
- Military career
- Allegiance: Austria-Hungary
- Branch: Austro-Hungarian Army
- Service years: 1886–1918
- Rank: Colonel general
- Conflicts: World War I: Serbian campaign; Italian front

Viktor Graf von Scheuchenstuel (May 10, 1857 – April 17, 1938) was a colonel general in the Austro-Hungarian Army. He was a general staff officer and division commander until World War I broke out. During World War I he was a Corps and Army commander serving in Serbia, Albania and Italy. During World War I he was promoted to Graf (equivalent to a Count) in the Austrian nobility. Following the end of World War I and the end of the Austro-Hungarian Empire, Scheuchenstuel retired from the military. He died in Vienna.

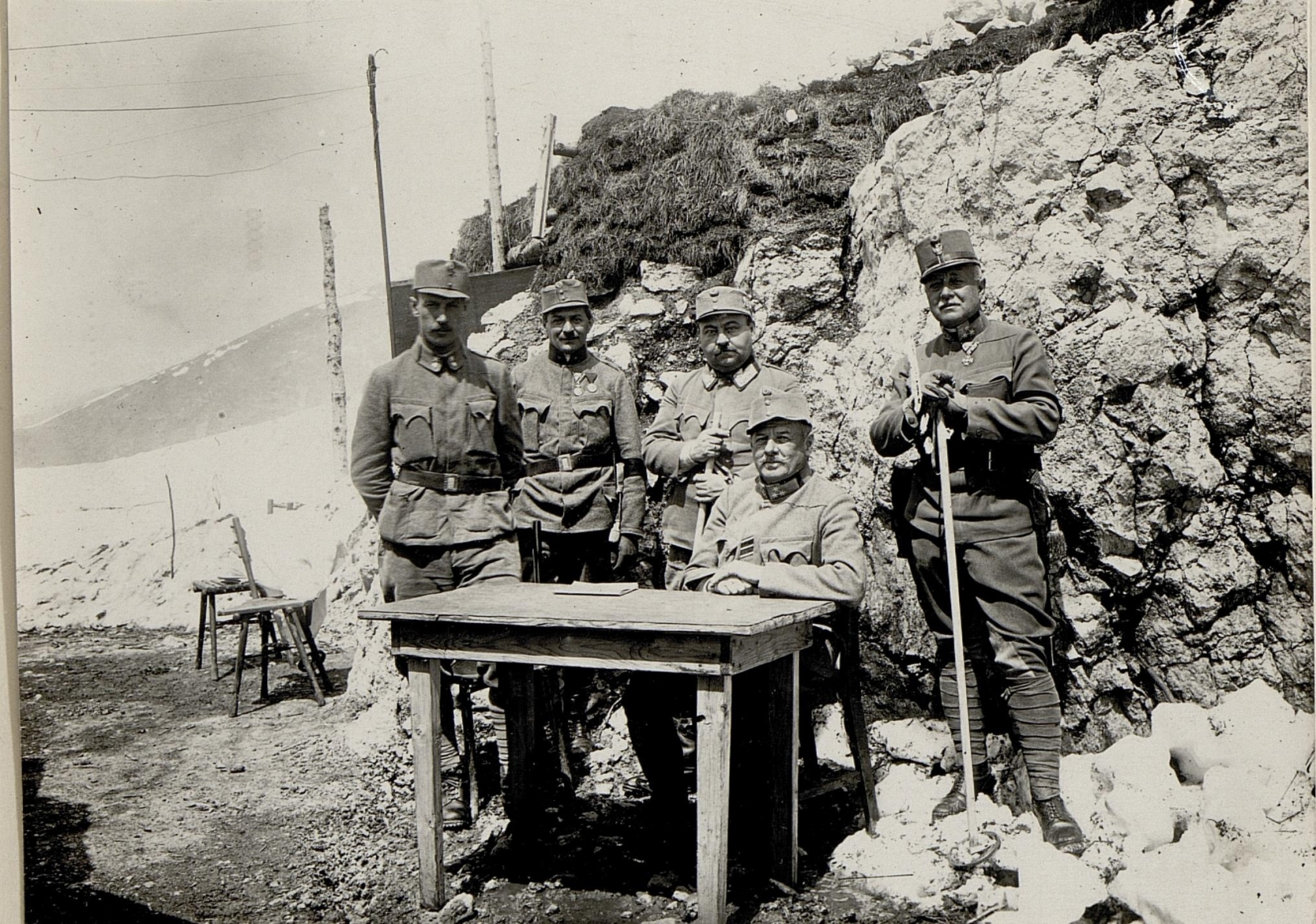
Von Scheuchenstuel with officers on Monte Biaena

== Before World War I ==
Scheuchenstuel was born in Witkowitz, Moravia (now part of the Czech Republic). In 1874 he attended Pioneer Cadet School in Hainburg in Austria. He served as a lieutenant and Oberleutnant in the Pioneers until 1884 when he attended a military academy in Vienna. Following graduation in 1886, Scheuchenstuel joined the Austro-Hungarian General Staff. In 1903 he commanded the Austro-Hungarian 50th Infantry Regiment. Following the promotion to major general in 1907 he commanded the 69th Infantry Brigade, the 8th Mountain Brigade and the 10th Infantry Division. In 1911 he was promoted to field marshal lieutenant and in 1912 took over the 9th Infantry Division.

== World War I ==
=== Serbian Front ===
In August 1914 Field Marshal Lieutenant Scheuchenstuel commanded the Austrian 9th Infantry Division, which was part of General Arthur Giesl von Gieslingen's VIII. Corps on the Serbian border. Around August 12 three Austrian Armies, including the VIII. Corps, attacked Serbia in what became known as the First Invasion of Serbia. The Austrians were driven back by August 24, with over 50,000 men lost. On October 12, 1914, Gieslingen was relieved of duty and Scheuchenstuel assumed command of the Austrian VIII. Corps.

In mid-November Scheuchenstuel's VIII. Corps joined General Potiorek's V. Army in the invasion of Mačva in Northern Serbia. Scheuchenstuel advanced through Serbia reaching Belgrade, abandoned by Serbian Marshal Putnik, on December 1. Once Putnik resupplied, he counter-attacked and drove the Austrian army back. By December 16 the VIII. Corps was back across the Danube and out of Belgrade.

Throughout most of 1915 Scheuchenstuel was involved in battles along the Serbian front. Finally in October 1915, his VIII. Corps was included in Field Marshal von Macksensen's Army for the Conquest of Serbia. The Central Powers Army under Mackensen was able to crush the Serbian Army, and by December 1915 the VIII. Corps was part of General Kövesshaza's III. Army on the Albanian Front.

=== Albanian Front ===
On January 25, 1916, the Austro-Hungarian Army attacked Montenegro which quickly surrendered. The army then moved down into the Italian controlled Albania, which fell to the Austrians by the end of winter. The Serbian Army made a fighting retreat over the Albanian coastal mountains. Once they reached the coast, the Italian and French Navies evacuated the Serbian Army. By February 26, 1916 nearly all of Albania was under Austrian control.

=== Italian Front ===
On May 23, 1915, Italy declared war on Austria-Hungary, however the Italian front quickly became a stalemate as the Battles of the Isonzo led to heavy casualties on both sides without any major territorial gains. In an attempt to break the stalemate, on May 15, 1916 Army Group Archduke Eugen under the command of the Archduke Eugen of Austria attacked into the Trentino area in Italy. Scheuchenstuel's VIII. Korps was included as part of the XI. Army which formed half of the Army Group. Initially the attacks, which became known as the Battle of Asiago, were successful. The Austrian army was able to open a 5 mile wide and 12 mile deep gap in the Italian lines. However, by June 10, 1916 the attack had stalled. Following the effective Russian Brusilov Offensive the Austrian attack stopped completely, and the VIII. Korps was transferred east.

Following brutal fighting against the Russians, the entire VIII. Korps was disbanded. Scheuchenstuel was dismissed from the army following "disputes with Army High Command" in July. However he was reinstated by the Kaiser and given command of I. Korps in Romania in September.

=== Romanian Front ===
Scheuchenstuel's new I. Korps were part of Hermann Kövess von Kövessháza's VII. Army in northern Romania. The VII. Army in the north was not directly involved in Falkenhayn's counterattack and sweep through southern Romania, but was certainly involved in fighting in the Carpathian Mountains. By January 1917, most of the fighting appeared to be over. On February 28, 1917, Scheuchenstuel was made a noble and given the rank of Graf. In addition to his rank, he was given command of the XI. Army on the Italian Front.

=== Return to the Italian Front ===
By spring 1917 Scheuchenstuel was in command of the Austro-Hungarian 11th Army on the Italian Front. He was under the command of Count Franz Conrad von Hötzendorf, commander of the entire Front. He took part in the Battle of Caporetto in November 1917, one of the largest Central Powers victories in Italy. Following the victory at Caporetto, Scheuchenstuel was promoted to Colonel General on November 16, 1917.

In the spring of 1918 he directed a diversionary attack into the Tonale Pass, which was beaten back by the Italians. During the summer of 1918, food supplies ran short prompting Scheuchenstuel to write to Count Franz Conrad insisting that more food was needed. Conrad blamed the suppliers and Army Headquarters ordered an increase in the meat ration. However, the supplies didn't exist and this order was not fulfilled.

The unsuccessful Battle of the Piave River in July 1918 resulted in Scheuchenstuel's troops being unable to advance. Due to dissatisfaction of his troops he was forced to retreat from Trentino after the Battle of Vittorio Veneto, which ended World War I on the Italian Front. Following the war, Scheuchenstuel retired in 1918. He died in Vienna on 17 April 1938.
