= 11th Army (Austria-Hungary) =

Austro-Hungarian field army during World War I

The Austro-Hungarian Eleventh Army was an Austro-Hungarian field army that fought during World War I.

== Actions ==
The Eleventh Army was formed in March 1916 on the Italian Front, where it remained active until the end of the War.
It participated in the

- Battle of Asiago (May - June 1916)
- Battle of Mount Ortigara (June 1917)
- Battle of Caporetto (October - November 1917)
- Battle of the Piave River (June 1918)
- Battle of Vittorio Veneto (October–November 1918)

== Commanders ==
- Viktor Dankl (14 March 1916 – 18 June 1916)
- Franz Rohr von Denta (18 June 1916 – 28 February 1917)
- Viktor von Scheuchenstuel (28 February 1917 – 3 November 1918)

== Sources ==
- Austro-Hungarian Army, Higher Commands and Commanders
