= 10th Army (Austria-Hungary) =

The Austro-Hungarian Tenth Army was an Austro-Hungarian field army that fought during World War I.

== Actions ==
The Tenth Army was formed in February 1916 on the Italian Front, where it remained active until the end of the War.
It participated in the

- Battle of Caporetto (October - November 1917)
- Battle of the Piave River (June 1918)
- Battle of Vittorio Veneto (October–November 1918)

== Commanders ==
- Franz Rohr von Denta : February 1916 - 18 June 1916
- Karl Scotti : 18 June 1916 - April 1917
- Alexander von Krobatin : April 1917 - 3 November 1918

== Sources ==
- Austro-Hungarian Army, Higher Commands and Commanders
