= Franz Conrad von Hötzendorf =

Austrian general (1852–1925)

Graf Franz Conrad von Hötzendorf
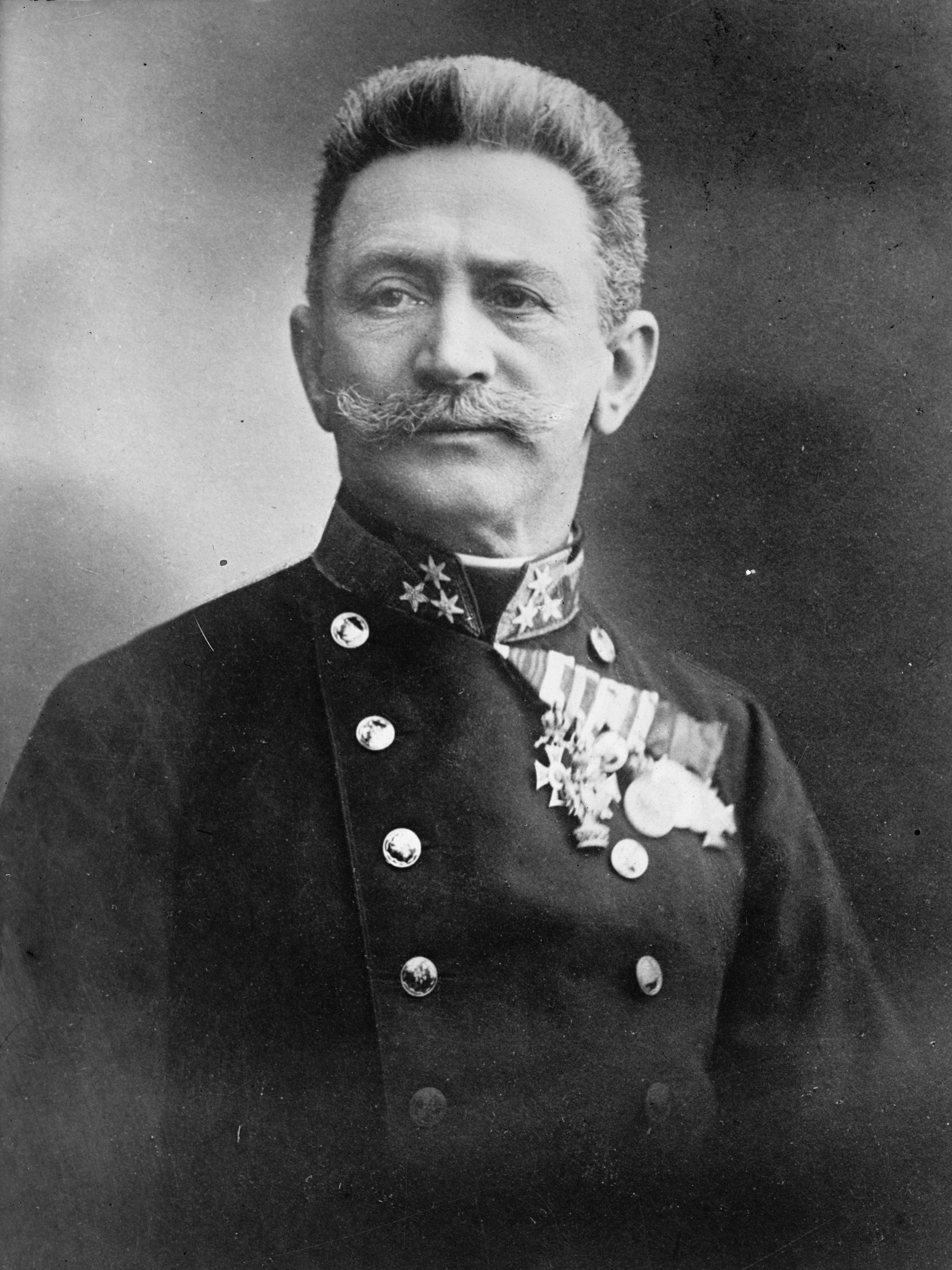
- Born: 11 November 1852; Penzing, Vienna, Austrian Empire
- Died: 25 August 1925 (aged 72); Mergentheim, Württemberg, Weimar Republic
- Military career
- Allegiance: Austria-Hungary
- Branch: Austro-Hungarian Army
- Service years: 1871–1918
- Rank: Feldmarschall
- Conflicts: First World War; Eastern Front; Battle of Galicia; Battle of Krasnik; Battle of Komarow (1914); Battle of the Vistula River; Battle of Krakow; Battle of Limanowa; Carpathian Campaign; Gorlice–Tarnów offensive; Great Retreat; Italian front; Battles of the Isonzo; 1st Battle of the Isonzo; 2nd Battle of the Isonzo; 3rd Battle of the Isonzo; 4th Battle of the Isonzo; 5th Battle of the Isonzo; 6th Battle of the Isonzo; Battle of Doberdò; 7th Battle of the Isonzo; Battle of Asiago
- Awards: See below

Franz Xaver Josef Conrad von Hötzendorf (after 1919 Franz Conrad; 11 November 1852 – 25 August 1925), sometimes anglicised as Hoetzendorf, was an Austrian general who played a central role in World War I. He served as K.u.k. Feldmarschall (field marshal) and Chief of the General Staff of the military of the Austro-Hungarian Army and Navy from 1906 to 1917. He was in charge during the July Crisis of 1914 that caused World War I.

For years he had repeatedly called for preemptive war against Serbia to rescue the multiethnic Austro-Hungarian Empire, which was, he believed, nearing disintegration. Later on, he came to believe that the Dual Monarchy had taken action at the eleventh hour. The army was also unprepared and he had resorted to politics to further his goals. He was unaware that Germany would relocate the majority of its forces to the Eastern Front, rather than in the Balkans.

Conrad was anxious about invading Russia and when the Tsar's armies had captured the Carpathian mountain passes and were on the verge of invading Hungary, Italy entered the war on the side of the Allies. The Austro-Germans cleared Galicia and Poland during the Gorlice–Tarnów Offensive in the summer of 1915 and later conquered Serbia in October with the help of Bulgaria. From 1915 on his troops were increasingly reliant on German support and command. Without support from its German allies the Austro-Hungarian Army was an exhausted force.

In March 1917, Emperor Charles I dismissed him as Chief of Staff after Franz Joseph I died and Conrad's Trentino Offensive had failed to achieve its objective; he then commanded an army group on the Italian Front until he retired in the summer of 1918. He died in 1925.

== Life ==
Conrad was born in Penzing, a suburb of Vienna, to an Austrian officers' family. His great-grandfather Franz Anton Conrad (1738–1827) had been ennobled and added to his name the nobiliary particle von Hötzendorf as a predicate in 1815, referring to the surname of his first wife who descended from the Bavarian Upper Palatinate region. His father Franz Xaver Conrad (1793–1878) was a retired colonel of Hussars, originally from southern Moravia, who had fought in the Battle of Leipzig and took part in the suppression of the Vienna Uprising of 1848, wherein he was severely wounded.

Conrad married Wilhelmine le Beau (1860–1905) in 1886, with whom he had four sons.

In the latter part of his life, he was known to hold doubts about his fitness for office (like his German counterpart, Helmuth von Moltke the Younger) and occasionally suffered severe bouts of depression. These worsened after the death of his wife in 1905. In 1907, while attending a dinner party in Vienna, Conrad met and quickly became enamoured of Virginia von Reininghaus, an Italian aristocrat. In the weeks following this, he made many attempts to court Reininghaus, despite the fact that she was already married and with six children, which eventually resulted in the two conducting an affair. This illegitimate pairing continued until their marriage in 1915.

Upon his death in 1925, a journal titled "Diary of my Sufferings" was found. The journal compiled over 3,000 letters written to Reininghaus, some over 60 pages in length, detailing the extent of Conrad's love for her. In order to prevent a scandal breaking out from a potential leak, Conrad kept the letters private and they were never sent to their intended recipient. (Note: U.S. Air Force Academy historians Mark Grotelueschen and Derek Varble suggest that, according to those letters, Conrad's eagerness to lead Austria-Hungary into war stemmed from his hope that, as a national hero in the wake of a war he believed he and the Empire could easily and quickly win, the Catholic Church would readily grant Reininghaus a divorce and allow the two to marry.)

=== Military career ===
Conrad joined the cadet corps of the Hainburg garrison and was educated at the Theresian Military Academy in Wiener Neustadt. He developed a strong interest in natural science, especially in Charles Darwin's theory of evolution. In 1871, at age 19, he was commissioned as a lieutenant in a Jäger battalion. After graduating from the Kriegsschule military academy in 1876, he was transferred to the General Staff Corps of the Austro-Hungarian Army.

In 1878–1879, upon the Treaty of Berlin, these duties brought him to the Condominium of Bosnia and Herzegovina and Sanjak of Novi Pazar, when those Ottoman provinces were assigned to the military administration of Austria-Hungary. He was a Captain (Hauptmann) and served as a staff officer during the 1882 insurrection in the Austrian Kingdom of Dalmatia. In 1886, he was appointed Chief of Staff of the 11th Infantry Division at Lemberg, where he showed great ability in reforming field exercise. In the fall of 1888, Conrad was promoted to major and appointed professor of military tactics in the Kriegsschule in Vienna, a position he prepared for by touring the battlefields of the Franco-Prussian War. Conrad proved to be a good teacher who was quite popular among his students.

=== Return to command and Chief of Staff ===
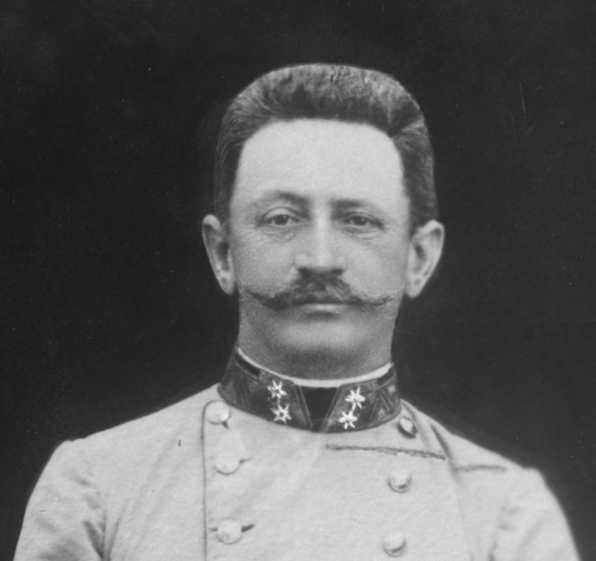
Chief of Staff, 1906

In 1892 he requested transfer back to command and took charge of the 93rd Infantry Regiment at Olomouc. From 1895 he commanded the 1st Infantry Regiment Kaiser at Kraków and from 1899 the 55th Infantry Brigade in Trieste, promoted to a Generalmajor. After acting against a major Italian uprising in the city in 1902, he was made Feldmarschalleutnant and took command of the 8th Infantry Division at Innsbruck in 1903.

By the time of his appointment as Chief of Staff for the Austro-Hungarian military forces at the suggestion of the heir to the throne (Thronfolger), Archduke Franz Ferdinand, in November 1906, Conrad had established a reputation as a teacher and writer. Like other Austro-Hungarian officers of his generation, he had little or no direct combat experience, but had studied and written extensively about theory and tactics. His published works on infantry tactics sold well and were printed in multiple editions. He was a tireless campaigner for modernization of the armed forces. He was made General der Infanterie in November 1908.

Strategically, he took the opposite approach to his countryman Carl von Clausewitz. Where Clausewitz had described war as "policy ... carried on with other means", Conrad, seeing conflict as always inevitable, viewed the role of politicians and diplomats as solely to create favorable conditions for successful military endeavors. "The fate of nations, peoples, dynasties", he wrote, "is decided not at diplomatic conferences but on the battlefield."

Emperor Franz Joseph I of Austria conferred the noble rank of a Freiherr on Conrad in 1910. Conrad's differences with Foreign Minister Alois Lexa von Aehrenthal, who objected several times to Conrad's suggestion of a preventive war with Italy, ultimately led to Conrad's dismissal as Chief of Staff in 1911, partly under the pretext of objection to Conrad's affair with von Reininghaus, whom he later married. After Aehrenthal resigned and died the next year, Archduke Franz Ferdinand urged Conrad's re-appointment, which took place during the Balkan Wars in December 1912.

Although Conrad's ideas had considerable impact in the decision making process of the government, especially in the lead-up to the First World War, historian John Leslie describes him as a "loner" who did not easily win friends or influence people and was politically inept. In the wake of the Balkan Wars, he regularly took the initiative to urge war on the government, often without provocation from the putative enemy or regard for the readiness of Austrian troops, believing that Serbian independence had led to a "foul peace" that the empire needed to correct if it was to have any chance to survive in the long term.

Conrad was a Social Darwinist, and believed life consisted of "an unremitting struggle for existence" in which the offensive was the only effective form of defence. The power of the Magyar elite within Austria-Hungary troubled him, as he believed it weakened and diluted what he saw as an essentially German-Austrian empire. He worried about Italian ambitions in the Balkans. His greatest ambition was for a pre-emptive war against Serbia in order to neutralize the threat that he believed they posed, and at the same time change the political balance within the Dual Monarchy against the Magyars by incorporating more Slavs in a third Yugoslavian component under Austrian control, denying the principle of self-determination. According to Hew Strachan, "Conrad von Hötzendorf first proposed preventive war against Serbia in 1906, and he did so again in 1908–09, in 1912–13, in October 1913, and May 1914: between 1 January 1913 and 1 January 1914 he proposed a Serbian war twenty-five times". Privately, Conrad conceded that the Austro-Hungarian Empire would likely not survive such a war, but it still needed to "perish gloriously".

=== First World War ===
==== Planning ====
Conrad and his admirers took special pride in his elaborate war plans that were designed individually against various possible opponents, but did not take into account having to fight a two-front war against Russia and Serbia simultaneously. His plans were kept secret from his own diplomatic and political leadership — he promised his secret operations would bring quick victory. Conrad assumed far more soldiers than were available, with much better training than they actually had. In practice, his soldiers were inferior to the enemy's. His plans were based on railroad timetables from the 1870s, and ignored German warnings that Russia had much improved its own railroad capabilities. He additionally disregarded von Moltke's regular exhortations to focus on Russia as the most pressing threat and set aside his emotional plans for war on Italy and Serbia.

In addition, Conrad's preparations for war fell far short of what was needed. In the kind of large continental war in which Austria-Hungary would likely fight Serbia or other European powers, close cooperation and coordination with its closest ally, Germany, was essential. Yet Conrad and his German counterpart, Helmuth von Moltke the Younger, held few meetings and were only able to agree that in that situation Germany would concentrate on fighting France while Austria-Hungary focused on Russia. As a result, when World War I did break out, the two allies both came to expect more from each other while delivering less than promised. Conrad also failed to restructure the Austro-Hungarian Army from one designed mainly to maintain domestic political balance into one that could fight the kind of wars he wished to. Despite being aware that his troops were insufficiently trained for those wars, as pre-war Austria-Hungary spent the least on its military and the least time training its soldiers of any major European state of the era, he never attempted to rectify that situation.

Conrad assumed the war would result in victory in six weeks. He assumed it would take Russia 30 days to mobilize its troops, and he assumed his own armies could be operational against Serbia in two weeks. When the war started, there were repeated delays, made worse when Conrad radically changed plans in the middle of mobilization. Russia did much better than expected, mobilizing two thirds of its army within 18 days, and operating 362 trains a day – compared to 153 trains a day by Austria-Hungary.

During the July Crisis upon the assassination of Archduke Franz Ferdinand, Conrad was the first proponent of war against the Kingdom of Serbia in response. Germany is thought to have requested an immediate invasion of Serbia, but Conrad delayed for over a month. Many Army units were on leave to harvest crops and not scheduled to return until 25 July. To cancel those leaves would disrupt the harvest and the nation's food supply, scramble complex railroad schedules, alert Europe to Vienna's plans, and give the opposition time to mobilize. Meanwhile, Emperor Franz Joseph I went on his long-scheduled three week summer vacation.

==== Victories and defeats ====
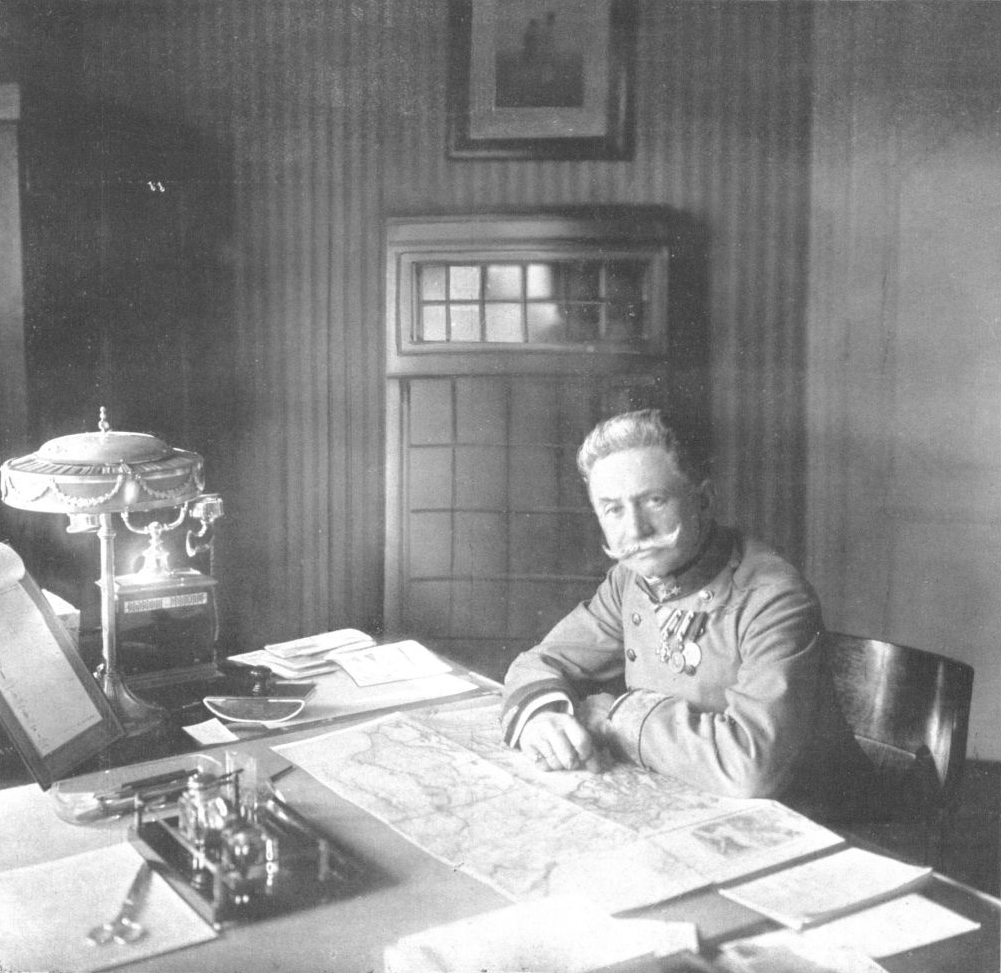
Conrad at the map table, 1914

On 12 August 1914, Conrad sent an army of 460,000 men into Serbia where it suffered a humiliating defeat within months to Radomir Putnik's outnumbered Serb forces, drawing on what they had learned during the Balkan Wars.

Conrad's failure to plan for simultaneous wars with Serbia and Russia led to considerable resources being expended moving his B-Staffel swing force to the former front where, after ten days of inactivity, they were redeployed to the Russian front. (Note: Putnik knew that this was possible, and so refrained from attacking them.) Instead of taking up positions at the expected front line in Galicia after getting off the train, Conrad ordered all units except cavalry to detrain 160 km (99 mi) short of the lines and march the rest of the way. (Note: This change of plan might have made sense if they were expected to take a defensive posture, but Conrad's plans called for fighting only offensive battles.) By the time they reached the front ten days later, the remaining troops were exhausted.

On 22 August he launched an even larger campaign against Russia through Galicia, after early victories at Kraśnik and Komarów which were followed by defeat and the loss of Lemberg. Conrad unexpectedly had to deal with a massive incursion of Imperial Russian troops into Austrian Galicia. His plans had underestimated Russian strength and speed, while ignoring the glaring weaknesses in his own army. His forces did win a great victory at Limanowa, in December 1914, saving Kraków.

However, during the later months of the year, Conrad applied much of the army's efforts to breaking the Siege of Przemyśl, briefly retaking the fortress there in October. Later he ordered poorly prepared troops to attack via the shortest route, through the passes of the Carpathian Mountains, which offered many defensive possibilities for Russian troops as well as winter weather to contend with. In April 1915 the fort finally surrendered. By then many of Austria's nearly one million casualties had come from efforts to relieve Przemyśl, an objective that had lost most of its strategic importance as the siege wore on. Late in 1914 Conrad said privately that if Franz Ferdinand were still alive he would have had him shot for his poor performance, even as Conrad publicly blamed others for his failures.

After the Germans scored major victories especially at Tannenberg, and after the Western front was bogged down in stalemate, Germany had resources to help Austria-Hungary. Although Conrad was officially in command, the German forces alongside him increasingly took control of the situation. Berlin sent in large armies and together they conquered large parts of Serbia, Montenegro and Romania and stabilised the Italian front.

He urged the new Foreign Minister Stephan Burián von Rajecz to annex the occupied lands, and he continuously intrigued against the Hungarian prime minister István Tisza as well as against the Austrian minister president Count Karl von Stürgkh, whom he considered a fool, though to no avail. In addition, relations with the German Supreme Army Command (OHL) worsened due to the uneasy relationship between Conrad and General Erich von Falkenhayn, who replaced von Moltke.

==== Italian campaigns and retirement ====
Following the accession of Emperor Charles I of Austria to the throne in November 1916, Conrad was elevated to the rank of field marshal, one of only three men in Austria-Hungary to hold that rank at the time. While still the heir-apparent, Charles had reported to Emperor Franz Josef that the "mismanagement" in the army's high command could not be cleared out until Conrad was replaced, but admitted that finding someone to take his role would not be easy. Yet under the new emperor, Conrad's powers were gradually eroded. In December, the commander-in-chief Archduke Friedrich of Austria-Teschen was removed from office, which the new emperor assumed himself. Charles took operational control of all combat units in the army and navy and on 1 March 1917 officially dismissed Conrad, who then requested retirement. The Emperor personally asked him to remain on active duty, and when Conrad accepted, he was placed in command of the South Tyrolean Army Group.

In that command, determined to punish "perfidious" Italy, (Note: The troop movements required for this left Austro-Hungarian troops on the Eastern Front, already depleted from Conrad's earlier failed campaigns there, vulnerable to the 1916 Russian Brusilov Offensive.) he repeated many of the same mistakes and oversights that had characterized his leadership on the Eastern Front. The Central Powers' greatest success, the Battle of Caporetto, came after the Germans largely took over and marginalized Conrad.

In the late spring of 1918, Conrad launched his last offensive, which became the Second Battle of the Piave River. He begged Vienna for additional troops as he had far fewer infantrymen and cavalrymen than needed. Those reinforcements were available, but deliberately denied by Conrad's superiors. He launched the offensive anyway, which resulted in 45,000 new casualties and no gains. The casualties, combined with an increase in the desertion rate afterwards, effectively ended the Austro-Hungarian Army as a fighting force for what remained of the war.

The costly and bloody assaults led by both Conrad and Svetozar Boroević brought condemnation upon the imperial leadership. Further complicating Conrad's image was his identification with those in the government intent on continuing the war. In this atmosphere, Conrad, described as a "broken man", was dismissed on 15 July, perhaps in an effort to deflect further criticism. At the same time he was promoted from Freiherr to the noble rank of a Graf (count) and received the honorific post of a Guard colonel.

Ennobled as Freiherr, usually translated as 'baron', in 1910 and made a Graf, usually translated as 'count', in 1918, Conrad became simply Franz Conrad-Hötzendorf in April 1919, when the First Austrian Republic abolished nobility for its citizens.

=== Death ===
After the war, Conrad denied any personal guilt for the outbreak and the results of the war and blamed the Imperial court and politicians for it. Embittered and sickened, he died on 25 August 1925, while taking a cure in Mergentheim, Germany.

When he was buried at Hietzinger Cemetery in Vienna on 2 September 1925, more than 100,000 mourners participated in observances. After long discussion, his grave of honor (German: Ehrengrab) was redesignated a historical grave in 2012.

== Strategies and performance ==
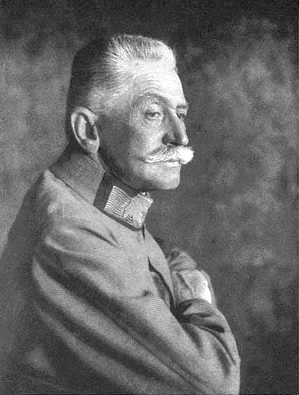
Conrad late in life

Conrad's legacy as a commander remains controversial, with earlier historians regarding him as a military genius, while more recent works characterize him as an utter failure. One mid-20th-century military historian considered him to be "probably the best strategist of the war." Taking the opposing view, early 21st-century U.S. Air Force Academy historians Mark Grotelueschen and Derek Varble focused primarily on Conrad's failure to plan for a two-front war with both Russia and Serbia in devoting their contribution to the 2022 anthology The Worst Military Leaders in History. "In a conflict notorious for failed generalship", they write, "[Conrad] repeatedly demonstrated that he was the worst of a bad lot." His expertise was almost exclusively in tactical matters, and when it came to strategy, "was no match for the position."

In military matters, Conrad emphasized the importance of aggressive, well-trained infantry and the strategic and tactical offensive. Historian Gunther E. Rothenberg argued that his unrealistically grandiose plans disregarded the realities of terrain and climate, and that the plans which he drew up frequently underestimated the power of the enemy and the potential of quick-firing artillery forces. He also based his plans on outdated information, such as the 1870 rail schedules he used to estimate Russia's ability to mobilize, disregarding frequent warnings from von Moltke that the country had greatly improved its capabilities since then. This led him to believe that following a swift victory over Serbia, Austrian forces would be able to pivot to Galicia before the Russians could arrive on the front in great numbers.

Conrad refused to take responsibility for the start of the war, or for Austria-Hungary's defeat, arguing that he had "been 'just a military expert' with no voice in the key decisions". Later historians found that the record contradicted this assertion, with Conrad having incessantly urged war on the government well before the July Crisis began. During that time Leopold Berchtold, the Empire's Foreign Minister, described Conrad's position as "Krieg, Krieg, Krieg". As early as 1925 Austrian Social Democrat Otto Bauer said that Conrad was one of the five or six men in all of Europe who bore primary responsibility for the war. "Conrad not only wanted war," wrote Grotelueschen and Varble a century later, "he was practically desperate for it." His role in agitating for war was so great that Grotelueschen and Varble suggest that Austria-Hungary, rather than Germany as commonly believed, was the more belligerent party.

To his admirers he was a military genius. Soviet general and theorist Boris Shaposhnikov presented Conrad as a model for a good Chief of the General Staff in his 1927 book Mozg Armii. The historian Cyril Falls, in his 1959 book The Great War, argues that Conrad was probably the best strategist of the war and that his plans were brilliant in conception. He argues that German generals in the east based most of their successful offensive operations on Conrad's plans. German general Paul von Hindenburg praised Conrad as a man of superior ability and a bold general, only hindered by the weaknesses of his army. However, the earlier scholarship that attributed the success of the 1915 Gorlice–Tarnów offensive in part to Conrad's planning has been supplanted by later examinations of the documentation that show those plans to have been largely drawn up by von Falkenhayn, who minimized Conrad's involvement as much as he could.

Conrad's critics contend that his mistakes led to the disastrous first year of war that crippled Austro-Hungarian military capabilities. For example, in the 1914 Serbian Campaign, led by General Oskar Potiorek, the Royal Serbian Army proved far more effective than Conrad had expected despite the Austro-Hungarian manpower advantage. Undefeated in all major battles, it enforced a full-scale retreat of Conrad's troops by the end of the year. The first Austro-Hungarian offensives against Russia were remarkable for their lack of effect, culminating in the losses at Galicia and Przemyśl combined with massive human cost.

Conrad was fully responsible for this disaster, for he had committed too many troops in Serbia, leaving severely outnumbered units to resist the Russian advance. Conrad blamed the German allies, who had driven out the Russian Army from East Prussia in the Battle of Tannenberg, for the lack of military support. He steadfastly refused to accept blame for any failures, throughout the war, always faulting either allies or his own subordinates for failing him. This excuse was belied by the Germans winning victories over the same opposing forces at the same time and on the same terrain, with similar dispositions of forces. What success Conrad's troops enjoyed later in the war came either due to more serious Russian errors, or with substantial German support.

== Legacy ==
In the years after the war, he was revered, largely as a symbol of lost imperial glory, by other former officers. After his death in 1925, his second wife and former mistress similarly burnished and defended his reputation. For decades, the reputation of the Austro-Hungarian Army and Conrad as one of the greatest military commanders in modern history was a matter of national pride among patriotic circles in post-war Austria—though his policies and tactics had already been criticized by contemporaries like Karl Kraus, who in his satirical drama The Last Days of Mankind portrayed him as a vain poser (I 2). Not until the 1960s, in the course of the renewed controversy over the causes of World War I, did the evaluation of his role shift from hagiography towards a widespread perception as a warmonger and imperialist. The massive casualties his forces took through wave attacks rather than any tactical or strategic acumen has given him a reputation of being a callous and incompetent commander.

Conrad's guard uniform and some of his personal belongings are on display at the Heeresgeschichtliches Museum, Vienna. In 1938 the Wehrmacht barracks of the 1st Mountain Division in Oberammergau, Bavaria were named Conrad-von-Hötzendorf-Kaserne; it is today operated by the Bundeswehr and site of the NATO School. The medical service centre of the Austrian Armed Forces in Innsbruck is named after Field Marshal Conrad. In the Austrian cities of Graz and Berndorf streets were named Conrad-von-Hötzendorf-Straße.

== Decorations and awards ==
National

  - Knight of the Imperial Order of the Iron Crown, 1st Class with War Decoration, 1908
  - Grand Cross of the Austrian Imperial Order of Leopold, with War Decoration, 1911
  - Military Merit Cross, 1st Class with War Decoration, 8 December 1914
  - Grand Cross of the Military Order of Maria Theresa, 1917
  - Gold Military Merit Medal ("Signum Laudis")
  - War Medal
  - Medal for 35 years of military service for officers
  - Bronze Medal for the 50th year of the reign of Franz Joseph

Foreign

- Kingdom of Prussia:
  - Grand Cross of the Order of the Red Eagle
  - Knight of the Royal Order of the Crown, 2nd Class with Star
  - Knight of the Order of Merit of the Prussian Crown, 9 September 1909
  - Pour le Mérite (military), 12 May 1915; with Oak Leaves, 26 January 1917
- Bavaria:
  - Grand Cross of the Military Merit Order
  - Grand Cross of the Military Order of Max Joseph, 21 July 1915
- Saxony: Commander of the Military Order of St. Henry, 2nd Class
- Kingdom of Romania: Grand Cross of the Order of the Star of Romania

== Works cited ==
- Beaver, Jan G. Collision Course: Franz Conrad Von Hötzendorf, Serbia, and the Politics of Preventive War (2009).
- Fellner, Fritz. "Some reflections on Conrad von Hötzendorf and his Memoirs based on Old and New Sources." Austrian History Yearbook 1 (1965): 74-89. His memoirs contain many documents
- Fried, Marvin. Austro-Hungarian War Aims in the Balkans During World War I (Palgrave Macmillan, 2014).
- Clark, Christopher (2013). "Chapter 2 Hawks and Doves". The Sleepwalkers: How Europe Went to War in 1914. HarperCollins. ISBN 978-0-06-114665-7.
- Grotelueschen, Mark; Varble, Derek (2022). "Franz Conrad von Hötzendorf". In Jennings, John M.; Steele, Chuck (eds.). The Worst Military Leaders in History. London: Reaktion Books. ISBN 9781789145830.
- Hadley, Tim. "Military Diplomacy in the Dual Alliance: German Military Attaché Reporting from Vienna, 1906—1914." War in History 17#3 (2010): 294-312.
- Rothenburg, G. E. (1976). The Army of Francis Joseph (Eurospan 1998 ed.). West Lafayette, Indiana: Purdue University Press. ISBN 978-0-91119-841-6.
- Sondhaus, L (2000). Franz Conrad von Hötzendorf. Architect of the apocalypse. Boston: Humanity Press. ISBN 978-0-391-04097-7.
- Wawro, Geoffrey (2014). A Mad Catastrophe - The Outbreak of World War 1 and the Collapse of the Habsburg Empire. New York: Basic Books. ISBN 978-0-465-02835-1.
- Zametica, John. Folly and Malice: The Habsburg Empire, the Balkans and the Start of World War One (2017)

Military offices
Preceded by Friedrich von Beck-Rzikowsky	Chief of the General Staff; 1906–1911	Succeeded by Blasius von Schemua
Preceded by Blasius von Schemua	Chief of the General Staff; 1912–1917	Succeeded by Arthur Arz von Straußenburg
Preceded by New Creation	Commander Army Group Conrad; 1917–1918	Succeeded by Archduke Joseph
