= Edmund von Krieghammer =

Austrian general and minister of war (1832-1906)

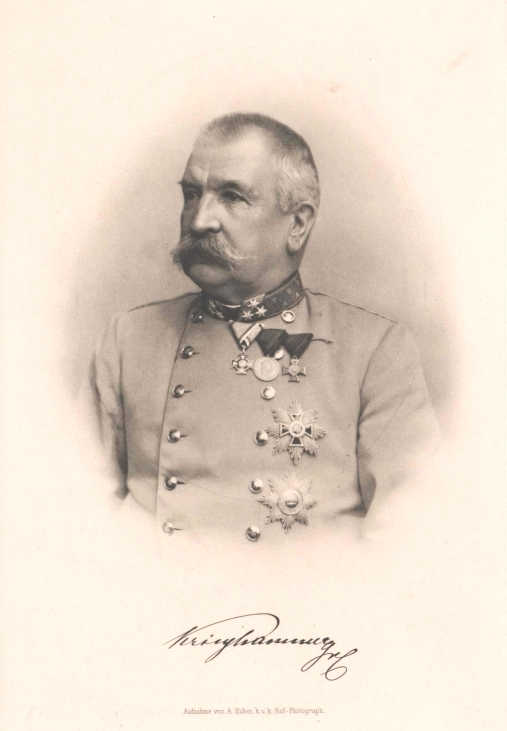
Edmund von Krieghammer

Edmund Freiherr von Krieghammer (4 June 1832 – 21 August 1906) was an Austrian General of the Cavalry and Imperial and Royal Minister of War of Austria-Hungary.

== Life ==
Krieghammer was born in Landshut; he attended the Theresian Military Academy in Wiener Neustadt, enlisted as a lieutenant in the 5th Imperial and Royal Dragoons regiment in 1849 and then fought on the Austrian side in the Hungarian Revolution. He participated in the Second Italian War of Independence in 1859 and the Austro-Prussian War in 1866, with the rank of Rittmeister. After a period in the Kriegsschule, he was promoted to major and wing-adjutant of the Emperor in 1869, then Oberst in 1874, major general in 1879, and finally lieutenant field marshal in 1881.

In 1886, Krieghammer was placed in command of the cavalry division in Lwów, then in 1888 he was transferred to the 6th infantry division, and in 1889 he was made commander general of the 1st corps in Kraków. He was promoted to General of the Cavalry in 1891. On 23 September 1893, after the death of Ferdinand von Bauer he was named the new Imperial and Royal Minister of War. He resigned from this role in December 1902 after the military bill he had introduced to the Hungarian House of Representatives was rejected. His successor was Heinrich von Pitreich.

Edmund Freiherr von Krieghammer died on 21 August 1906 at Bad Ischl. After his death, Krieghammer was conveyed to the Slovenian town of Gomilsko in Braslovče and buried in the graveyard there, by his brother-in-law, Carl Haupt von Hohentrenk, owner of the nearby Schlosses Straussenegg (Štravsenek) who had an area in the graveyard reserved for family burials. The grave still survives.

von Krieghammer held the Grand Cross of the Order of Saint Stephen of Hungary.

== Bibliography ==
- Rainer Egger: "Krieghammer Edmund Frh. von". In: Österreichisches Biographisches Lexikon 1815–1950 (ÖBL). Vol. 4, Austrian Academy of Sciences, Vienna 1969, p. 271 f. (Direct links to "p. 271", "p. 272")
- Walter Wagner (1982). "Krieghammer, Edmund Freiherr von". Neue Deutsche Biographie (in German). Vol. 13. Berlin: Duncker & Humblot. pp. 44–45. (full text online).
