= Rudolf von Merkl =

Military officer of Austria-Hungary (1831–1911)

Freiherr Rudolf von Merkl (28 March 1831–22 January 1911) was a general in the Common Army of Austria-Hungary and briefly served as Imperial and Royal Minister of War in 1893.

Merkl was born in Vienna in 1831 and entered the military in 1849. served as an officer of the general staff in Lombardy-Venetia during the Austro-Prussian War of 1866. From 1872, he was leader of the 5th division of the Imperial ministry of war, where he was responsible for the preparations for the Austro-Hungarian campaign in Bosnia and Herzegovina in 1878.

From 1885 to 1888, Merkl served as a section chief in the ministry of war and he was interim minister of war from 5 August to 23 September 1893, following the sudden death of Ferdinand von Bauer. He retired from service in 1899 and died in Vienna in 1911.

== Bibliography ==
- Peter Broucek: "Merkl, Rudolf Frh. von". In: Österreichisches Biographisches Lexikon 1815–1950 (ÖBL). Vol. 6, Austrian Academy of Sciences, Vienna 1975, ISBN 3-7001-0128-7, p. 231.
