= Artur Maximilian von Bylandt-Rheidt =

Austro-Hungarian General of the Artillery

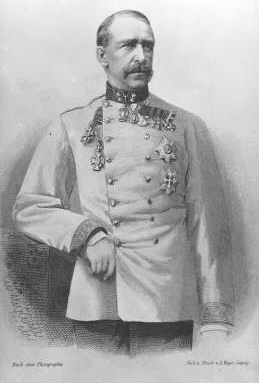
Artur Maximilian von Bylandt-Rheidt

Artur Maximilian von Bylandt-Rheidt (3 May 1821 - 21 February 1891) was an Austro-Hungarian General of the Artillery and Imperial and Royal Minister of War from 1876 to 1888.

== Life ==
Artur Maximilian von Bylandt-Rheidt came from the officer family of Bylandt-Rheidt. His parents were the Austrian officer Ferdinand von Bylandt-Rheidt (1796-1862) and his wife Adelheid von Mikusch und Buchberg (1798-1877).

Bylandt-Rheidt enrolled in the Austrian army as a cadet in 1837 and participated in the suppression of the Hungarian Revolution in 1848 and 1849 and fought in the Second Italian War of Independence in 1859.

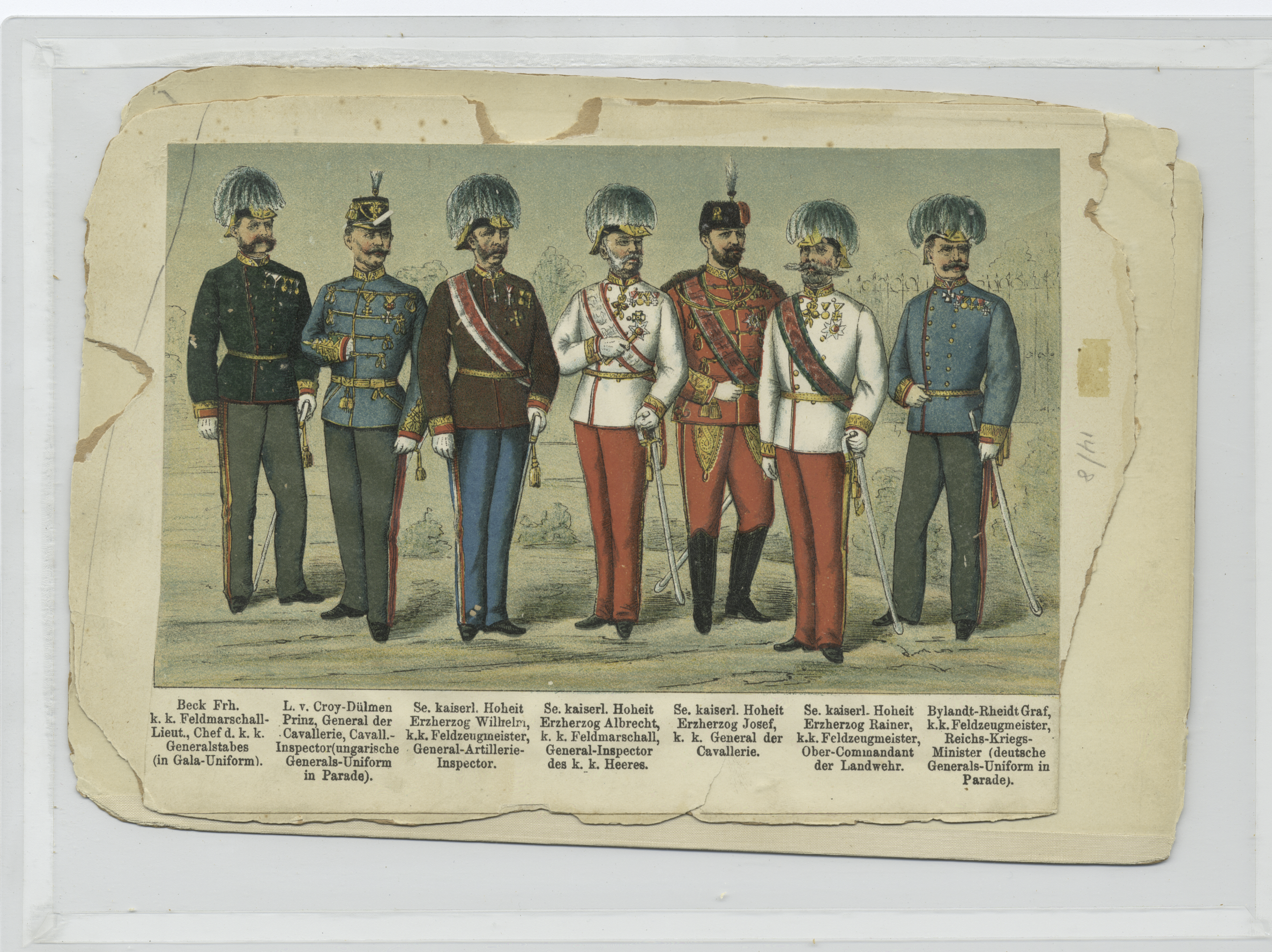
The High Command of the Austro-Hungarian Army 1887, from left Chief of the General Staff: Friedrich von Beck-Rzikowsky, Inspector General of Cavalry Prince Leopold von Croÿ-Dülmen, Archduke Wilhelm Franz of Austria, Archduke Albrecht, Duke of Teschen, Archduke Rainer Ferdinand of Austriaand Minister of War Arthur Maximilian von Bylandt-Rheidt

In 1864 he was appointed president of the artillery committee in the Field artillery directorate and then in 1866, after the retreat of the northern army in the Austro-Prussian War, he was made ad latus of the directorate. In 1869 he was promoted to Major General and appointed president of the technical and administrative military committees of the Austro-Hungarian Army. While still in this role, he was promoted to Lieutenant field marshal in 1874.

On 20 June 1876 he was appointed Imperial and Royal Minister of War and devoted himself in this position to the reform of the army, especially the artillery. On 21 August 1876, he participated in the opening ceremony for the Reichsbrücke in Vienna. In 1882 he was additionally appointed General of the Artillery. During his period of service, the military salary was raised from 100 to 117 florins and the period of compulsory service was raised to ten years by the Landsturm law. He also began the introduction of new small arms developed by Ferdinand Mannlicher. Bylandt-Rheidt supported the retention of a single language in the Army and was an opponent of the decentralisation of the military railways.

On 17 March 1888, Bylandt-Rheidt was sent into retirement at his own wish. He split the final years of his life, in poor health, in Vienna at Praterstraße 66, Wien-Leopoldstadt, in Vöslau and in Baden bei Wien.

== Family ==
He married Countess Maria Anna von Harbuval und Chamare (25 August 1832 - 8 September 1912) on 27 January 1852 in Prague. The pair had four children:

- Maria von Bylandt-Rheidt (5 October 1852 - 11 December 1919), who married Emanuel von Waldstein (1840-1894) in 1872.
- Anton von Bylandt-Rheidt (22 May 1859 - 30 December 1943), who married Johanna Lexa von Aehrenthal (1869-1939) in 1897.
- Artur von Bylandt-Rheidt (3 February 1854 - 5 July 1915), Austrian Minister of Agriculture and Minister of the Interior, who married Franziska von Saint-Genois (1854-1929) in 1883.
- Eugen von Bylandt-Rheidt (28 April 1866 - 5 December 1914).

== Publications ==
Bylandt-Rheidt was also the author of several military manuals, including:

- Schießen und Werfen aus Feld- und Gebirgskanonen (Firing from Field and Mountain Artillery), 1872.
- Der indirekte Schuss mit Hohlgeschossen (Indirect shot with hollow shells), 1874.
- Wirkung und Gebrauch der k. k. österreichischen Feld- und Gebirgsgeschütze (Function and Use of the Imperial and Royal Austrian Field and Mountain Guns), 1878.

== Awards and honours ==
- Order of the Iron Crown (Austria), Second Class, 1 February 1870
- Geheimrat, 20 June 1876
- Order of the Iron Crown, First Class, 20 December 1876
- Great Cross of the Order of Leopold, 19 October 1878
- Knight of the Order of the Golden Fleece, 25 April 1887
- Great Cross of the Order of Saint Stephen of Hungary, 1888

== Bibliography ==
- Oskar Regele (1957). "Bylandt, Arthur Maximilian Adrian Graf von, Freiherr zu Rheidt". Neue Deutsche Biographie (in German). Vol. 3. Berlin: Duncker & Humblot. pp. 86–86. (full text online).
- "Bylandt-Rheidt Artur Maximilian von". In: Österreichisches Biographisches Lexikon 1815–1950 (ÖBL). Vol. 1, Austrian Academy of Sciences, Vienna 1957, p. 131 f. (Direct links to "p. 131", "p. 132")
