= Supreme Commander of the Imperial and Royal Armed Forces =

Ultimate commanding authority of the Austro-Hungarian Armed Forces

(in official languages)
German	Oberkommandierender der Streitkräfte von Österreich-Ungarn
Hungarian	A Császári és Király Fegyveres Erők Főparancsnoka
- Coat of Arms of Austria-Hungary

- Standard of the Supreme Commander

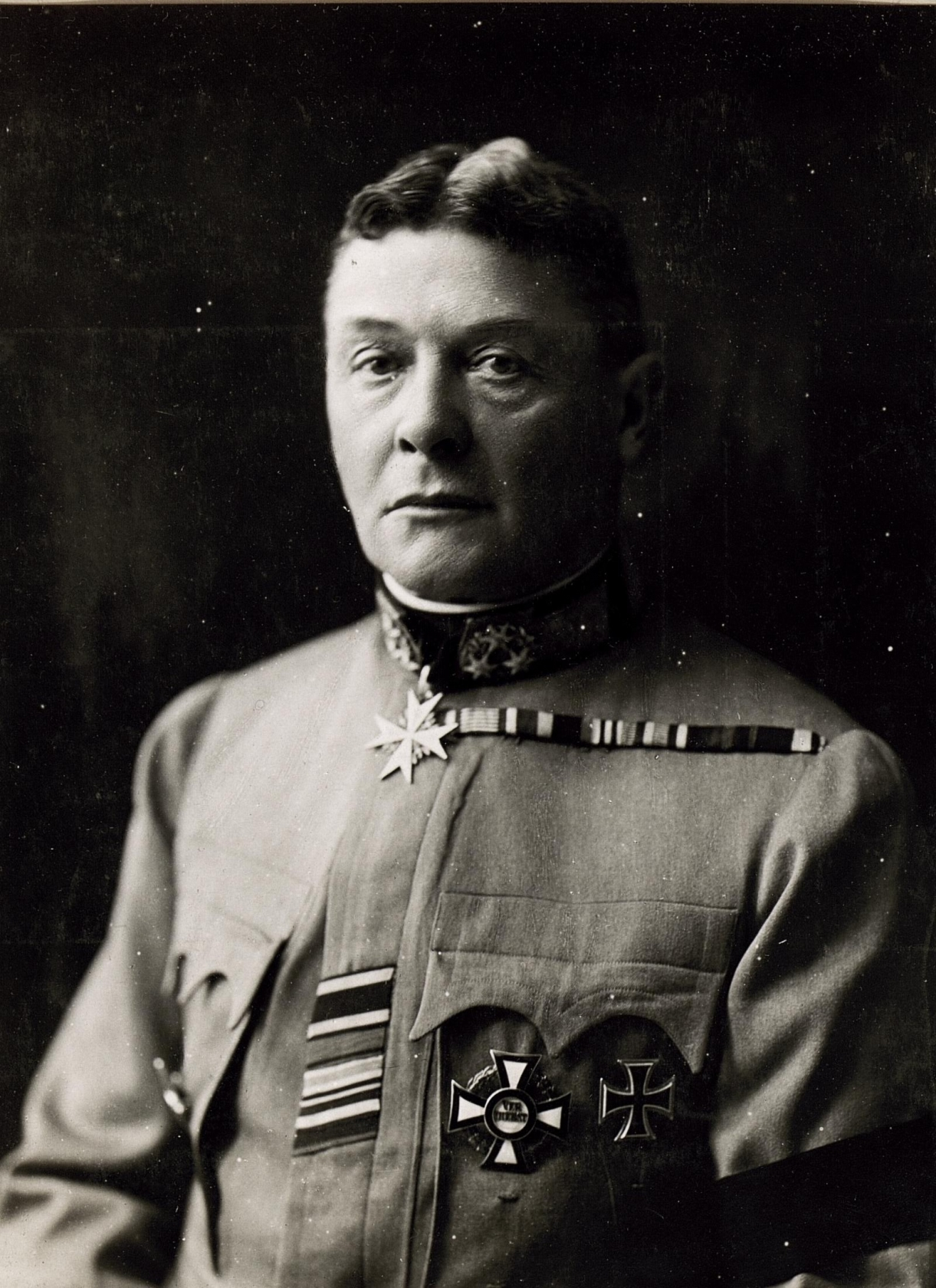
- Last holder Hermann Kövess; 4 November 1918 – 1 December 1918
- Austro-Hungarian Armed Forces; Military Chancellery
- Type: Commander-in-chief
- Reports to: Emperor–King
- Appointer: Emperor–King
- Formation: 2 December 1848
- First holder: Franz Joseph I
- Final holder: Hermann Kövess
- Abolished: 1 December 1918
- Deputy: Adjutant General

The Supreme Commander of the Imperial and Royal Armed Forces (German: Oberkommandierender der Streitkräfte von Österreich-Ungarn; Hungarian: A Császári és Király Fegyveres Erők Főparancsnoka) was the ultimate authority of the Austro-Hungarian Armed Forces – which comprised the Army, Navy and Aviation Troops of Austria-Hungary.

== Highest Commander-in-Chief ==
The Supreme Commander was usually the Emperor of Austria as Highest Commander-in-Chief (Allerhöchste Oberbefehl; Legmagasabb Főparancsnok). The Emperor ran the armed forces (Bewaffnete Macht or Wehrmacht) through the Military Chancellery of His Imperial and Royal Majesty the Emperor-King (Militärkanzlei Seiner Majestät des Kaisers und Königs; Őfelsége a Császár-Király Katonai Kancelláriájá) that was established on 11 July 1867. Amongst its heads, who usually bore the title Adjutant General (Generaladjutant), were:

- Friedrich von Beck-Rzikowsky (11 July 1867 – 1881)
- Arthur Freiherr von Bolfras (1889 – 5 January 1917)

In his old age Franz Joseph I only rarely exercised the function of supreme commander in person. Instead, in 1905 after the death of Field Marshal Archduke Albert — who had taken over the post in 1866 from General Benedek and held it until his death in 1895 — he appointed Archduke Friedrich of Austria-Teschen as his representative using the style: At the disposal of the Supreme Commander - His Imperial and Royal Highness General of Infantry and Inspector of the Army Archduke Friedrich (Zur Disposition des Allerhöchsten Oberbefehls - se. k.u.k. Hoheit General der Infanterie und Armeeinspektor Erzherzog Friedrich).

Besides Friedrich, whose duties were mainly ceremonial, Archduke Franz Ferdinand had a great influence on the armed forces in the last years of the monarchy, and worked hard to keep them united and to expand them. In 1898, after a career as an officer, he was appointed "at the disposal of the Supreme Commander" (zur Disposition des Allerhöchsten Oberbefehles), in order to oversee the army as a whole as well as the navy. To that end, from 1899, he maintained his own military chancellery (headed from December 1905 to autumn 1911 by Alexander von Brosch-Aarenau and from autumn 1911 to June 1914 by Carl von Bardolff), at Belvedere Palace, which was successively expanded by Brosch into a secondary government (Nebenregierung). In 1913 the heir to the Emperor was appointed as Inspector General of the Armed Forces (Generalinspektor der gesamten bewaffneten Macht); at his request Franz Joseph I appointed General Conrad as Chief of the General Staff (1906–1911 and 1912 – 1 March 1917). The CGS, since the reform of 1895 called the CGS of the Armed Forces (Chef des Generalstabs für die gesamte bewaffnete Macht), had the right to a personal audience with the monarch (without the presence of the Minister of War), whereby the CGS was superior to the Defence Ministry as well as the Imperial Chancellery, and the Inspector General of Troops was subordinated to him; only the heir apparent outranked him.

At the onset of World War I, the Emperor appointed Friedrich as commander in chief, following the usual practice in times of crisis to appoint a serving officer to exercise high command of the army. Friedrich assumed this function until 2 December 1916, when the new Emperor, Charles I, took over supreme command himself.

Charles himself gave up the supreme command at the end of the war, in order not to have to sign the peace treaty and terms of surrender personally.

== List of officeholders ==
=== Supreme commanders ===
No.	Portrait	Supreme commander	Took office	Left office	Time in office	Ref.
1	Franz Joseph I	His k.u.k. Apostolic Majesty; Franz Joseph I (1830–1916) (Note: Emperor and Apostolic King (Kaiser and apostol. König), etc., Supreme Commander (Allerhöchster Oberbefehl) (2 Dec 1848 Emperor; 27 Feb 1895 Prussian GFM))	1848	1914	65–66 years	.
2	Archduke Friedrich, Duke of Teschen	His k.u.k. Highness Field marshal Archduke Friedrich, Duke of Teschen (1856–1936) (Note: Supreme Commander of All Armed Forces (Oberkommandierender der gesamten bewaffneten Macht))	11 July 1914	2 December 1916	2 years, 144 days	.
3	Charles I	His k.u.k. Apostolic Majesty Grand Admiral and Colonel General; Charles I (1887–1922) (Note: Emperor and Apostolic King, etc., Supreme Commander (Kaiser and apostol. König, etc., Allerhöchster Oberbefehl) (Gen of Cav and Adm; 1 Nov 1916 Grand Adm and Col Gen; 21 Nov 1916 Emperor; 12 Feb 1917 Prussian GFM))	2 December 1916	3 November 1918	1 year, 336 days	
4	Hermann Kövess von Kövessháza	Field marshal Hermann Kövess von Kövessháza (1854–1924) (Note: Army commander (Armeeoberkommandant) (was commander of the army group in the western Balkans; 5 Aug 1917 FM))	3 November 1918	1 December 1918	28 days	

=== Deputies ===
No.	Portrait	Deputy	Took office	Left office	Time in office	Supreme commander	Ref.
1	Archduke Albrecht, Duke of Teschen	His k.u.k. Highness Field marshal Archduke Albrecht, Duke of Teschen (1817–1895) (Note: Inspector General of the Armed Forces (Generalinspektor der gesamten bewaffneten Macht) (04 Apr 1863 FM; 3 Jul 1874 Russian GFM, 27 Nov 1893 Prussian GFM))	1866	18 February 1895 †	28–29 years	Franz Joseph I	
Vacant; Feb 1895 – 1898
2	Archduke Franz Ferdinand of Austria	His k.u.k. Highness General of Cavalry and Admiral; Archduke Franz Ferdinand of Austria (1863–1914) (Note: at the disposal of the Supreme Commander; from 1913 Inspector General of the Armed Forces (Generalinspektor der gesamten bewaffneten Macht) (26 September Heir apparent; 26 Apr 1899 Gen of Cav; 4 Sep 1902 Adm))	1898	28 June 1914 †	15–16 years	Franz Joseph I	
3	Archduke Friedrich, Duke of Teschen	His k.u.k. Highness General of Infantry and Inspector of the Army; Archduke Friedrich, Duke of Teschen (1856–1936) (Note: at the disposal of the supreme commander (08 Dec 1914 FM; 15 Nov 1908 Prussian GFM))	1905	1913	7–8 years	Franz Joseph I	.
Vacant; 1913 – 1916
(3)	Archduke Friedrich, Duke of Teschen	His k.u.k. Highness General of Infantry and Inspector of the Army; Archduke Friedrich, Duke of Teschen (1856–1936)	2 December 1916	11 February 1917	71 days	Charles I	.
Vacant; February 1917 – November 1918
4	Arthur Arz von Straußenburg	Colonel General; Arthur Arz von Straußenburg (1857–1935) (Note: Chief of the General Staff of the k.u.k Army (26 Feb 1918 Col Gen; 2 Mar 1917 Chief of the General Staff))	4 November 1918	1 December 1918	27 days	Hermann Kövess von Kövessháza	

== See also ==
- Minister of War (Austria-Hungary)
- Austrian Minister of Defence (Austria-Hungary)
- Minister of Defense (Austria)
- Austro-Hungarian General Staff
- Chief of the General Staff (Austria)

== Literature ==
- Zeinar, Hubert (2006), Geschichte des österreichischen Generalstabes, Vienna: Böhlau, ISBN 978-320577415-0
- The Army of Francis Joseph by Gunther E. Rothenberg
