= Alexander von Koller =

Austro-Hungarian military officer (1813-1890)

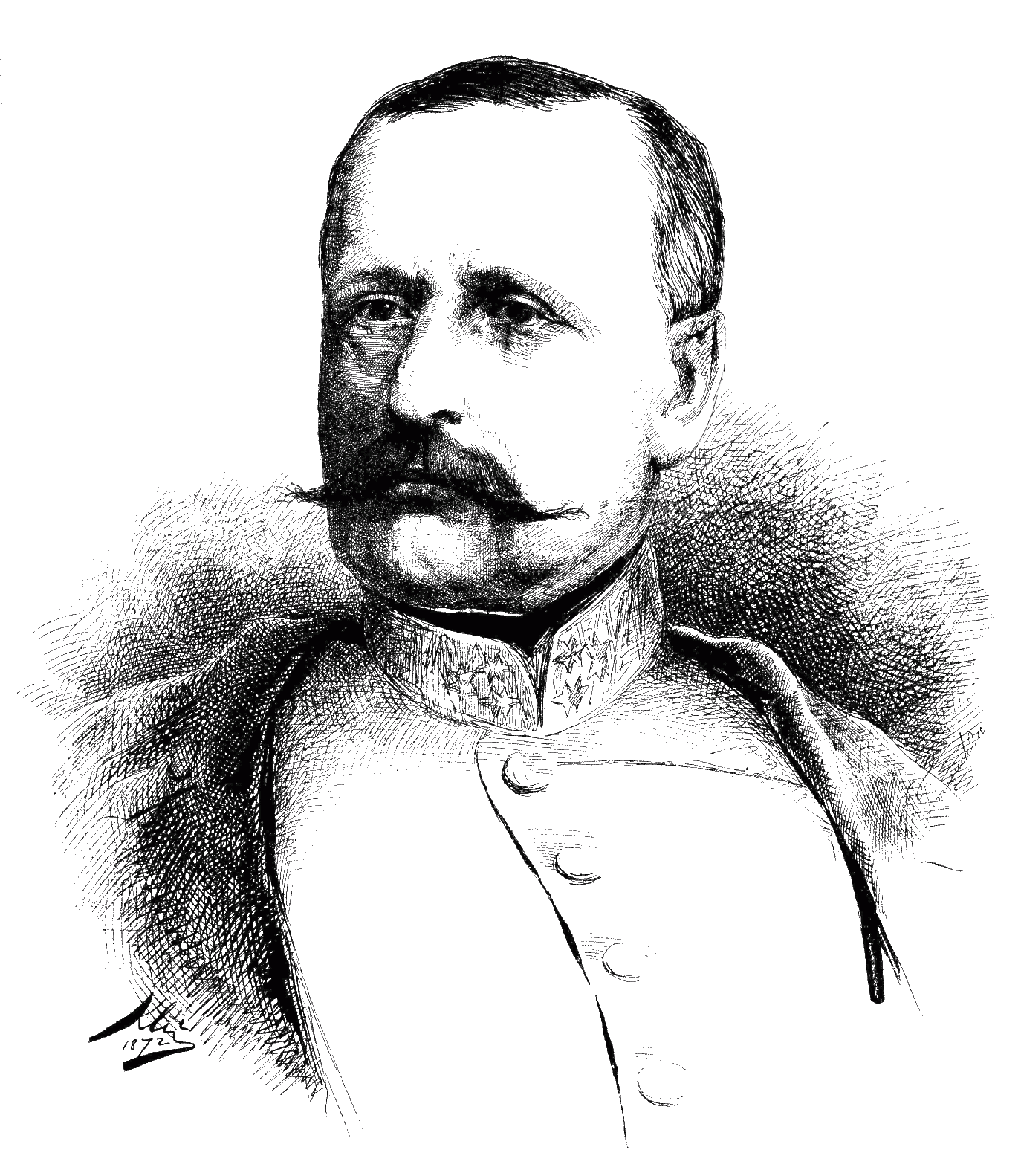
Alexander von Koller by Karel Klíč (Der Floh, 1872)

Alexander Freiherr von Koller (3 June 1813 – 29 May 1890) was an Austro-Hungarian military officer, who achieved the rank of general of the cavalry and served as Imperial and Royal Minister of War from 1874 to 1876.

== Family ==
Alexander von Koller was born in Prague, the son of Franz von Koller, an Austrian Lieutenant Field Marshal who had served in the Napoleonic Wars, and Johanna von Gränzenstein. Franz von Koller had received baronial status in 1809. In 1846, Alexander married Auguste Raymann and had two sons, Alexander and August, and a daughter, Johanna.

== Life ==
Von Koller spent his military career ascending the ranks through service in various regiments of the Imperial and Royal Hussars. In 1848, as a batman, he fought on the Austro-Hungarian side in the First Italian War of Independence, at the Battle of Sommacompagna, a skirmish by the Salizone, and the Battle of Custoza. In 1849, he distinguished himself in skirmishes at Borgo San Siro and Gambolò. In 1859, during the Second Italian War of Independence, von Koller was awarded the Knight's Cross of the Order of Leopold for his service. In 1866, during the Third war, he was admitted to the Order of the Iron Crown, Second Class, was promoted to the rank of lieutenant field marshal, and received command of the Imperial and Royal 5th (Nicholas I, Emperor of Russia's) Dragoons. In 1868 he became leader of the lieutenancy in Prague. For this service he was promoted to the First Class of the Order of the Iron Crown and was admitted to the Privy Council.

After a period as military commandant of Pressburg, von Koller was appointed Lieutenant Governor and commanding general of Bohemia in 1871. He succeeded in influencing the 1872 elections for the Bohemian Diet in favour of the "constitutional loyalists," so that despite the Slavic (Czech) majority in the Bohemian population, a German-Austrian majority was assured in the Diet. The measures which von Koller took in pursuit of this goal included corruption and outright violence and ultimately exacerbated the national conflict in Bohemia. His actions in this role were rewarded in Vienna, where he was awarded the Great Cross of the Order of Leopold.

In 1873, von Koller was promoted to the rank of general of the cavalry and in 1874 he was appointed Imperial and Royal Minister of War. On his retirement in 1876, he received the Great Cross of the Order of Saint Stephen of Hungary. In addition to these honours, he was a lifelong member of the Austrian House of Lords and was Captain of the 1st Archers' Life-Guard. He also received honorary citizenship of several Bohemian towns.

A newspaper report of 29 May 1890 claimed that, after a long and difficult illness, "there had been a significant improvement" in von Koller's condition, but in the next edition of that paper on 31 May, it was reported that Koller had died at Baden bei Wien. His funeral was attended by Emperor Franz Joseph I.

== Bibliography ==
- Koller, Freiherren. In: Ernst Heinrich Kneschke: Neues allgemeines deutsches Adels-Lexicon. Volume 5. Leipzig: Friedrich Voigt 1864, p. 222 (Alexander von Koller, p. PA222, at Google Books)
- Clam-Martinic, Heinrich Graf (1872) Der Wahlsieg der Verfassungstreuen in Böhmen im April 1872 und seine Bedeutung im österreichischen Verfassungsleben. Leipzig: Schmaler und Peck.
- Constantin von Wurzbach: "Koller, Alexander Freiherr von." In: Biographisches Lexikon des Kaiserthums Oesterreich (Biographical Lexicon of the Empire of Austria). Part 28 Kaiserlich-königliche Hof- und Staatsdruckerei, Vienna 1874, p. 359 f. (digitalised).
- Karl Sommeregger (1906). "Koller, Alexander Freiherr von" . Allgemeine Deutsche Biographie (in German). Vol. 51. Leipzig: Duncker & Humblot. p. 332.
- Erich Hillbrand: "Koller Alexander Frh. von". In: Österreichisches Biographisches Lexikon 1815–1950 (ÖBL). Vol. 4, Austrian Academy of Sciences, Vienna 1969, p. 87.
