= Imperial-Royal Landwehr =

Army unit of the Austro-Hungarian Empire

Obverse of the k.k. Landwehr's regimental colours

The Imperial-Royal Landwehr (German: kaiserlich-königliche Landwehr or k.k. Landwehr), also called the Austrian Landwehr, was the territorial army of the Cisleithanian or Austrian half of the Austro-Hungarian Empire from 1869 to 1918. Its counterpart was the Royal Hungarian Landwehr (k.u. Landwehr). The two Landwehrs, together with the Common Army and the Imperial and Royal Navy, made up the armed forces (Bewaffnete Macht or Wehrmacht) of Austria-Hungary. While the name, "Imperial-Royal", might seem to suggest a link between the "Imperial" (Cisleithanian) and "Royal" (Transleithanian or Hungarian) halves of the Empire, in this context "Royal" actually refers to the Kingdom of Bohemia (Königreich Böhmen or České království) - not a sovereign kingdom on par with the Kingdom of Hungary, but a crownland of Cisleithanian Austria-Hungary and possession of the Habsburgs, who remained formally entitled to kingship. In this sense, the Kingdom of Bohemia was comparable in status to the Kingdom of Galicia and Lodomeria and the Kingdom of Dalmatia.

Unlike the German Empire, where the Landwehr mainly comprised reservists and volunteers, the Imperial-Royal Landwehr consisted of regular units. It was fully established with regular troops and not partly mobilized or cadred. The Landwehr should not be confused with the Landsturm which was a volunteer militia.

== History ==
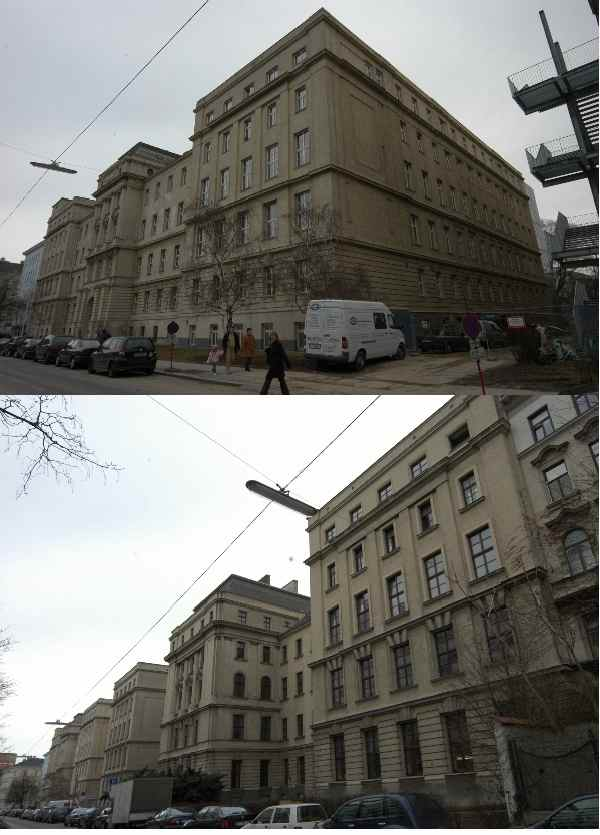
The building of the former Imperial Royal Franz Joseph Landwehr Academy in Vienna

The roots of the Landwehr go back to the 16th century when there were calls on all able-bodied men to defend their country.

During the Napoleonic Wars a Landwehr was established by imperial decree dated 9 June 1808 as a standing and common institution to complement the regular Austrian army. This army was used in 1809 and in 1813/14. In 1859, the Landwehr was abolished.

After the Austrian Empire had lost the war against Prussia, the Austro-Hungarian Compromise put an end of the unitary Austrian rule over Hungary and established the Dual Monarchy. Hungary now wanted its own forces under command of the Hungarian government alongside the existing Imperial and Royal Army and Navy, which were commanded by the Emperor and Austro-Hungarian Minister of War. So the Compromise included the right of Hungary to establish the Royal Hungarian Landwehr (Magyar Királyi Honvédség), often colloquially known as the Honved or Honvéd (Honvédség).

As a consequence, the Cisleithanian counterpart of the Honved, known as the Imperial-Royal Landwehr, was established in the "kingdoms and lands represented in the Reichsrat", i.e. the remaining Empire of Austria. Its tasks were finally confirmed in 1889 in the Austrian Defence Act (RGBl. 41/1889) as follows:

§ 4. The Landwehr is tasked in time of war to support the Army and to defend the homeland; in peacetime, and by exception, also to maintain law and order and security of the homeland.

In § 14 Wehrgesetz 1889 the annual recruiting quota for the Landwehr was set at 10,000 men.

Conscription in the Landwehr was from age 21 up to 32 and included two or three years on active duty. The one-year volunteer served just one year, but received no wages and had to pay for their own equipment. After age 32, conscripted Landwehr soldiers were transferred to the Landsturm militia. As there were more conscripts available than were needed, a lot decided who was assigned to the army, who to the militia and who to the reserve.

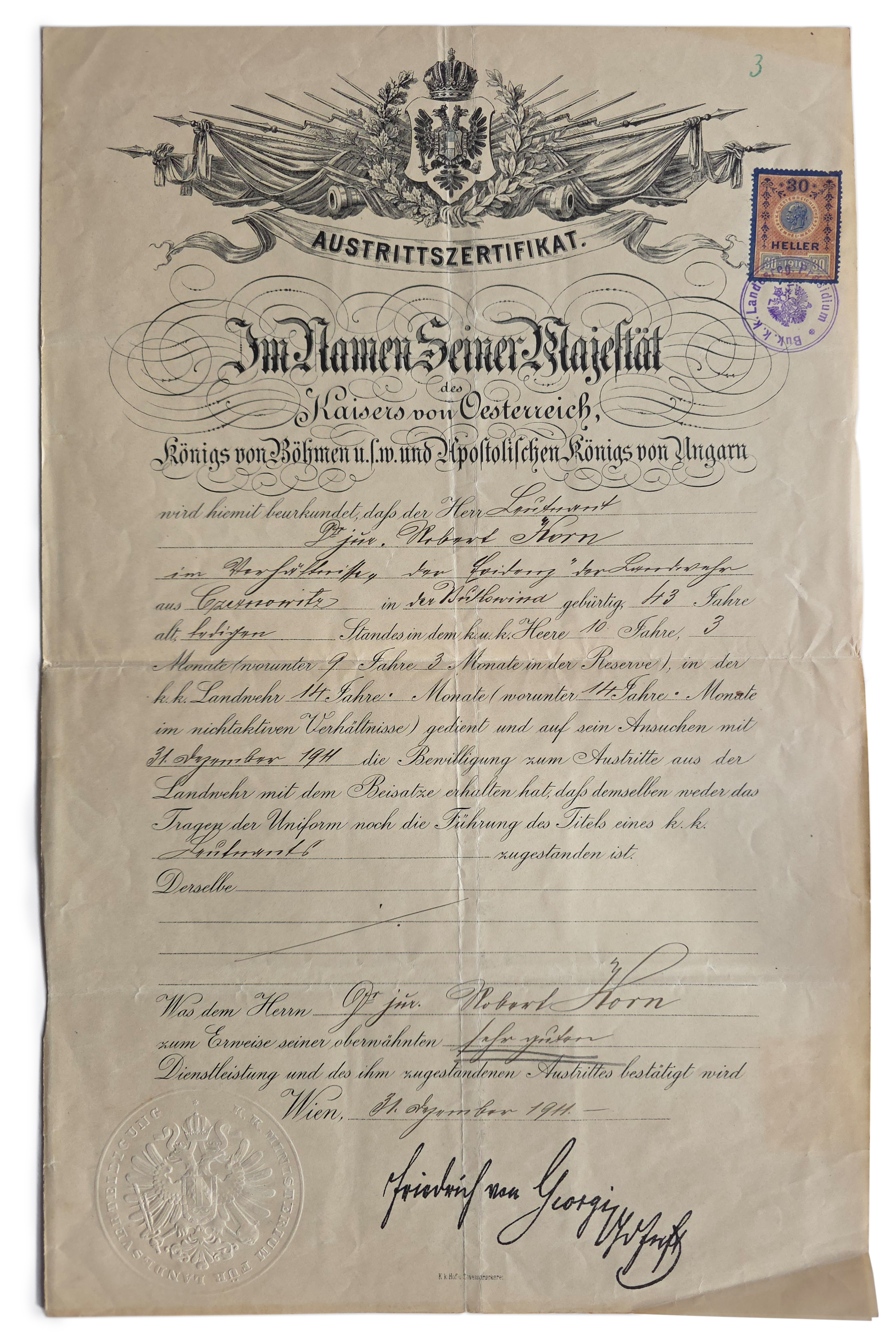
Discharge certificate issued to Dr. Robert Korn, lieutenant in the reserve of the k.k. Landwehr (1911)

The monarch became the supreme warlord, holding all authority over the structure, organization, and administration of the army. He appointed the senior officials, had the right to declare war, and was the commander-in-chief of the army.

The Landwehr's "March No. 1", which Beethoven composed in 1808, as the "March of the Bohemian Landwehr" (Marsch der böhmischen Landwehr), is known nowadays as the Yorck March (Yorckscher Marsch). As an element of the Grand Tattoo, performed e.g. by the Bundeswehr, it is now one of the best known German military marches.

== Colours ==
The Imperial-Royal Landwehr initially had no colours. However, in September 1915, Emperor Franz Joseph I granted the authority for the "M 1915" colours in recognition of "exceptionally meritorious achievements" by the Imperial Landwehr, which was then manufactured under the supervision of the Army Museum in 1916. These were to be handed over to the various regiments after the war. The process was regulated by the ordinances of the Imperial-Royal Landwehr, Standard Regulations, Part 22, dated 8 September 1915, in which the procedure for the award of colours was laid down by Special Order (Zirkularverordnung) 4 Sep 1915, Presentation No. 14,256. For this, the following letter was issued:

"His Imperial and Royal Apostolic Majesty, in gracious recognition of late of the exceptionally meritorious achievements by the Imperial Royal Landwehr, which fought throughout the recent war alongside troops of the Imperial and Royal Army, demonstrating stalwart and faithful discharge of duty before the enemy, and repeatedly earning the very highest tribute, graciously condescends to permit the Imperial Royal Landwehr troops to bear colours. In view of the design and material requirements of these colours, as well as their production and ceremonial presentation, they will only be available after the end of the war. This very highest act of grace is intended to spur the troops of the Imperial Royal Landwehr further to new deeds of heroism and, of course by further brilliant performance against the enemy, will prove they are worthy, time and again, of this most high honour!"

Freiherr von Georgi m.p.

General of Infantry

The colours were not issued during the period of the monarchy, but only later to traditional units. How many of these colours were made is not known. Records show that at least the colours of the 2nd Linz Landwehr Infantry Regiment were transferred to the Kameradschaftsbund ehemaliger Zweierschützen ("2nd Rifles Old Comrades Association") in Linz on 8 June 1924. Also the existence of the colours of the 1st Vienna Imperial Royal Landwehr Infantry Regiment are known to have existed.

== Structure ==
The Austrian Landwehr reported to the Imperial-Royal Ministry of Defence (likewise the Hungarian Honvéd reported to the Royal Hungarian Ministry of Defence - both independent of the joint Ministry of War).

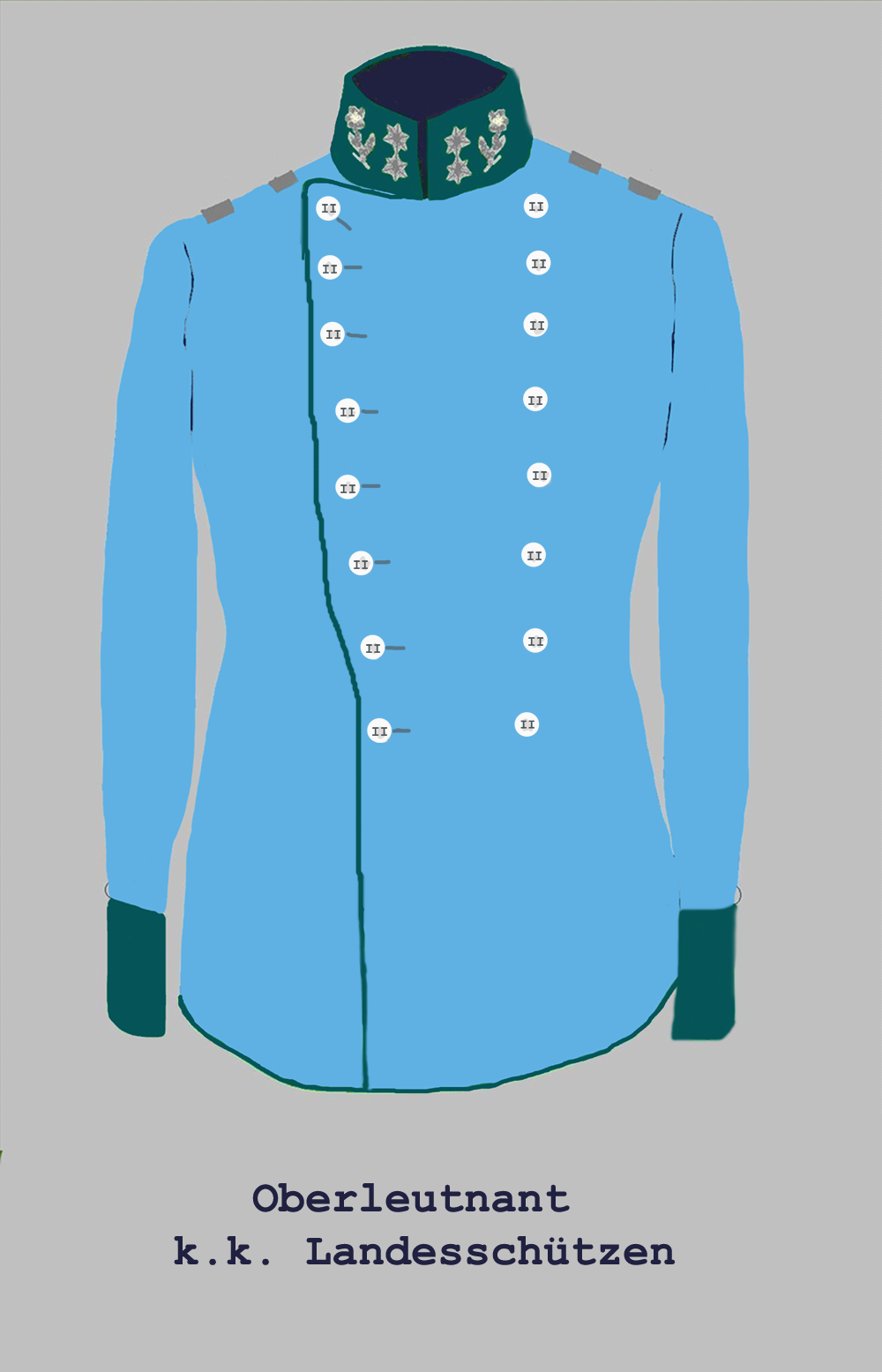
Service dress jacket of a 1st lieutenant in the k.k. Landwehr Rifles

The k.k. State Ministry of Defence was located in Vienna at Babenbergerstraße 5. The Landwehr high command was housed on the first floor of the former Imperial Department of Justice at Schillerplatz 4. Landwehr staffs and the Landwehr Base Command were quartered in private homes. During the First World War, the k.k. Ministry of Defence was responsible under the War Office for homeland defence.

The Landwehr had its own barracks, depots and officer training establishments. The training of Landwehr officers took place in the Imperial-Royal Franz Joseph Military Academy in Boerhaavegasse in Vienna, one of five military academies in Austria-Hungary. In addition, there was a military upper school in Vienna and a military lower school in Bruck an der Leitha.

The Landwehr barracks in Vienna were the Kaiserebersdorf Landwehr Artillery Barracks, the Emperor Franz Josef Landwehr Barracks and Siebenbrunnengasse Landwehr Barracks. Next to the last-named barracks was the Landwehr Equipment Depot. The Imperial-Royal Landwehr Arms Depot was the Arsenal in Vienna.

The Imperial-Royal Landwehr (k.k. or kaiserlich österreichisch/königlich böhmisch) was the standing army of Austria responsible for the defence of Austria itself. Its order of battle at the outbreak of the First World War was as follows:

- 37 infantry regiments - each of 3 battalions (4th with 5 bns, 23rd with 2 bns, and 27th with 4 bns)
- 6 regiments of lancers (uhlans)
- 8 field artillery battalions (Feldkanonen-Divisionen)
- 8 field howitzer battalions (Feldhaubitz-Divisionen)

The mountain infantry had the following units:

- 2 mountain infantry regiments, the 4th and 27th
- 4 Tyrolian rifle regiments (Tiroler Landesschützen Regimenter) (1st, 2nd and 4th with three battalions and the 3rd with 4 battalions) - from January 1917 named "imperial rifles" (Kaiserschützen)
- 1 mounted Tyrolian rifle battalion (Reitende Tiroler Landesschützen)
- 1 mounted Dalmatian rifle battalion (Reitende Dalmatiner Landesschützen)

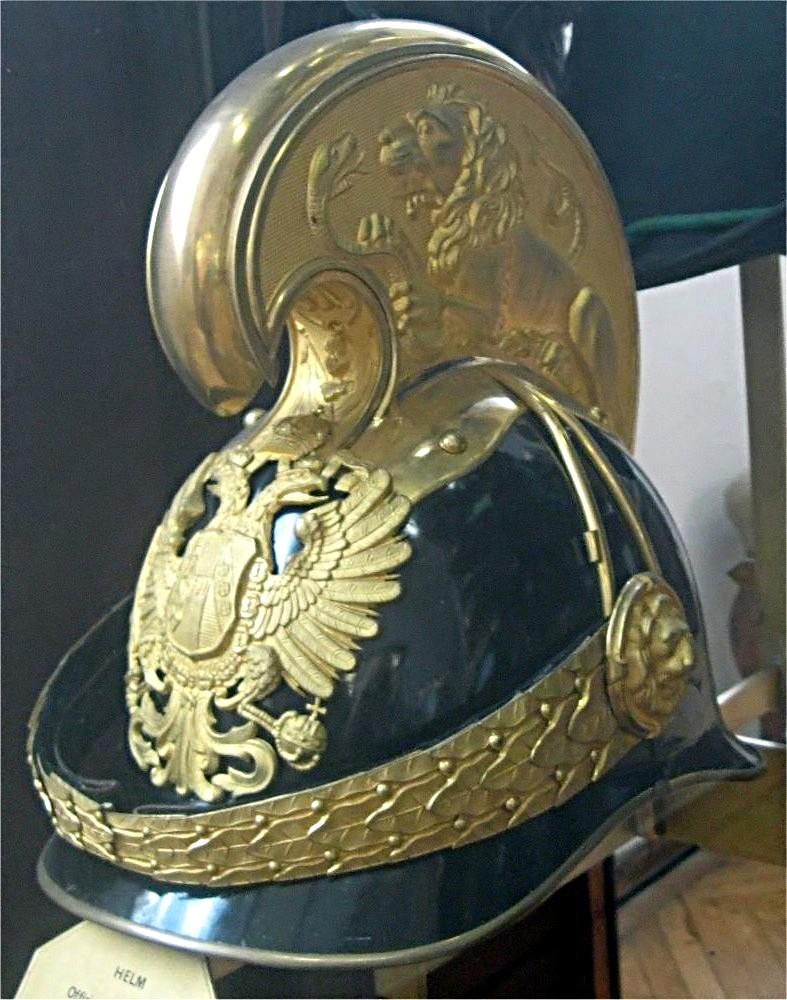
Officer's helmet, Imperial and Royal Dragoons

Although the Landwehr infantry regiments were weaker in personnel than Imperial and Royal Infantry regiments (Landwehr regiments had just three battalions instead of the usual four in the Common Army - exceptions were the 1st and 3rd State Rifle Regiments who also had four battalions), they were often superior in terms of equipment. The parliaments of Cisleithania and Transleithania were rather more willing, to support "their" troops with financial resources than the common army.

A special feature was the title of the Landwehr regiments, which bore the name of the garrison location of their regimental staff (e.g. 6th Eger Landwehr Infantry Regiment - k. k. Landwehr-Infanterie-Regiment "Eger" Nr. 6). The same was true of the state's rifle units, which also belonged to the Landwehr (3rd Innichen State Rifle Regiment - k.k. Landesschützen-Regiment „Innichen“ Nr. III). In this way, the closeness of each regiment with its garrison was emphasized.

== Infantry ==
On 11 April 1917 the infantry units of the Landwehr were renamed. The title "Landwehr" was replaced by "Schützen" ("Rifles"). The changes were as follows:

- Landwehr Infantry Division (Landwehr Infanterietruppen Division) = Imperial-Royal Rifle Division (k.k. Schützendivision)
- Landwehr Infantry Brigade (Landwehrinfanteriebrigade) = Imperial-Royal Rifle Brigade (k.k. Schützenbrigade)
- 5th (Pola) Imperial-Royal Landwehr Infantry Regiment (k.k. Landwehr Infanterie Regiment "Pola" Nr. 5) = 5th (Pola) Imperial-Royal Rifle Regiment (k.k. Schützenregiment "Pola" Nr. 5)

=== Landwehr Infantry Divisions ===
==== 13th Landwehr Infantry Division ====
Vienna VIII. Bez. Albertgasse 24

(Commander: Feldmarschalleutnant (FML) Eduard Edler von Kreysa, Chief of Staff (CoS): Captain (General Staff Corps) Heinrich Mazanee Edler von Engelhardswall) (Landwehr Command in Vienna)

===== 25th Landwehr Infantry Brigade =====
(Vienna VII Bez. Neustiftgasse 28) (Commander: Generalmajor (GM) Karl Englert)

1st Landwehr Infantry Regiment
24th Landwehr Infantry Regiment

===== 26th Landwehr Infantry Brigade =====
(Brno) (GM Emil Lischka)

14th Landwehr Infantry Regiment
25th Landwehr Infantry Regiment

==== 21st Landwehr Infantry Division ====
(Prague) (FML Artur Ritter von Przyborski, CoS: Lieutenant Colonel (General Staff Corps) Josef Ritter von Hiltl) (Landwehr Command in Prague)

===== 41st Landwehr Infantry Brigade =====
(Plzeň) (GM Otmar Panesch)

6th Landwehr Infantry Regiment
7th Landwehr Infantry Regiment

===== 42nd Landwehr Brigade =====
(Prague) (GM Alois Podhajský)
8th Landwehr Infantry Regiment
28th Landwehr Infantry Regiment
29th Landwehr Infantry Regiment

==== 22nd Landwehr Infantry Division ====
(Graz) (FML Heinrich Ritter von Krauss-Elislago, CoS: Major (General Staff Corps) Karl Plachota) (Landwehr Command in Graz)

===== 43rd Landwehr Infantry Brigade =====
(Graz) (GM Josef Nemeczek)

3rd Landwehr Infantry Regiment
26th Landwehr Infantry Regiment
31st/1st Landwehr Infantry Regiment

===== 44th Landwehr Infantry Brigade =====
(Pola) (GM Ignaz Schmidt Edler von Fussina)
4th Landwehr Infantry Regiment
5th Landwehr Infantry Regiment
27th/2nd Landwehr Infantry Regiment

==== 26th Landwehr Infantry Division ====
(Litoměřice) (FML Karl von Křitek, CoS: Lieutenant Colonel (General Staff Corps) Wilhelm Klingkigt) (Landwehr Command in Litoměřice)

===== 51st Landwehr Infantry Brigade =====
(Vysoké Mýto) (GM Viktor Seidler)

11th Landwehr Infantry Regiment
12th Landwehr Infantry Regiment
30th Landwehr Infantry Regiment

===== 52nd Landwehr Infantry Brigade =====
(Litoměřice) (GM Otto Gössmann)

9th Landwehr Infantry Regiment
5th Landwehr Infantry Regiment
10th Landwehr Infantry Regiment

==== 44th Landwehr Infantry Division ====
(Innsbruck) (FML Heinrich Tschurtschenthaler von Helmheim, CoS: Major (General Staff Corps) Ludwig Ritter Ehrlich von Treuenstätt) (Home Defence Command in Innsbruck)

===== 87th Landwehr Infantry Brigade =====
(Linz) (GM Rudolf Krauss)

2nd (Linz) Imperial-Royal Landwehr Infantry
21st Landwehr Infantry Regiment

===== 88th State Rifle Brigade =====
(Bozen) (GM Karl Georgi)

1st (Trient) Imperial-Royal Rifles
2nd (Bozen) Imperial-Royal Rifles
3rd (Innichen) Imperial-Royal Rifles

==== 45th Landwehr Infantry Division ====
(Przemyśl) (FML Stephan Ljubičić, CoS: Major (General Staff Corps) Milan Ritter Bleiweis von Tersteniški (Landwehr Command in Przemyśl)

===== 89th Landwehr Infantry Brigade =====
(Przemyśl) (GM Ernst Ritter Hörmann von Wöllersdorf und Urbair)

18th Landwehr Infantry Regiment
33rd Landwehr Infantry Regiment

===== 90th Landwehr Infantry Brigade =====
(Jaroslau) (GM Johann Edler von Sauerwein)

17th Landwehr Infantry Regiment
34th Landwehr Infantry Regiment

==== 46th Landwehr Infantry Division ====
(Kraków) (FML Karl Nastopil, CoS Captain (General Staff Corps) Emil Hondl (Landwehr Command in Kraków)

===== 91st Landwehr Infantry Brigade =====
(Kraków) (GM Alfred Kochanowsky Edler von Korwinau)

16th Landwehr Infantry Regiment
31st Landwehr Infantry Regiment

===== 92nd State Rifle Brigade =====
(Olomouc) (GM Adam Brandner Edler von Wolfszahn)

13th Landwehr Infantry Regiment
15th Landwehr Infantry Regiment

=== Landwehr Infantry Regiments ===
The infantry regiment consisted of only 3 battalions instead of the usual 4 found in the Common Army. The garrison name is always the location of regimental HQ.

№	Established	Garrison	Landwehr			Army Corps	CO (Colonel)	Staff officers	
№	Established	Garrison	Recruiting District	Inf. Bde	Inf. Div.	Army Corps	CO (Colonel)	Oberstleutnant (Lieutenant Col.)	Majors
1	1889	Vienna (Staff - XIII District HütteldorferStr. 188), 48°11′49″N 16°17′7″E	Vienna A	25th	13th	II	Alexander Dini	Gustav Urbanek, Karl Schubert	Friedrich Bitterlich, Franz Heillinger, Karl Edler von Ruckmich, Julius Hoppe
2	1889	Linz	Linz, Salzburg	87th	44th	XIV	Konstantin Ritter Wasserthal von Zuccari	Franz Unger, Anton Möstl	Josef Morel, Leopold Hirsch, Julius Vogel, Vinzenz Beran, Franz Drtina
3	1889	Graz, II Bn. Leoben	Graz, Marburg	43rd	22nd	III	Franz Flach	Friedrich Hadler, Friedrich Teppner	Maximilian Kispert, Josef Karpellus, Friedrich Ritter von Wohlrab, August Strasser
4 [A]	1889	Klagenfurt, II, III Bns. Hermagor	Klagenfurt	44th	22nd	III	Friedrich Eckhardt von Eckhardtsburg	Karl Brunner, Alois Edler von Fritsch	Eduard Alpi, Desiderius Deniflée, Robert Salomon, Emil Raabl von Hauenfreienstein
5	1889	Pola	Triest				Richard Keki	Eugen Vučinić, Bernhard Zahn, Georg Mitrović, Heinrich Mandolfo	Edmund Lazar, Peter Franičević, Emil Ritter von Fischer
6	1889	Eger	Eger, Beroun	41st	21st	VIII	Adolf Hansmann	Col. Viktor Friedel; Lt. Col. Ludwig Dierkes, Eduard Edler von Adamek	Richard Klär, Simon Ronacher, Leopold Schnabl
7	1889	Plzeň, III Bn. Rokycany	Plzeň, Beroun	41st	21st	VIII	Franz Sappe	Leo Pflug, Johann Weber, Adam Brun	Wilhelm Baumgartner, Eduard Scheiber, Wilhelm Mayer-Koffler, Karl Fischer
8	1889	Prague	Prague, Beroun	42nd	21st	VIII	Albert Welley	Wilhelm Pulz, Josef Trink	Franz Wolf, Franz Štěpánek, Jakob Zdeněk, Klaudius Ritter Schoen von Liebingen, Johann Nachtmann, Julius Biborosch
9	1889	Litoměřice, III Bn. Chomutov	Litoměřice, Chomutov	52nd	26th	IX	Josef Ritter Reyl-Hanisch von Greiffenthal	Col. Karl Edler von Maschke; Lt. Col. Franz Schmidt, Franz Knirsch	Erwin Preuss, Franz Gasser, Leo Stangl
10	1889	Mladá Boleslav, III Bn. Turnov	Mladá Boleslav, Turnov	52nd	26th	IX	Viktor Meisel	Franz Wanke, Karl Bubnik	Moritz von Frank, Johann Preiss
11	1889	Jičín, III Bn. Jaroměř	Jičín, Hradec Králové	51st	26th	IX	Emil Stangl	Col. Ignaz Bezděk; Lt. Col. Josef Basler, Karl Petzold, Franz Rutta, Edgar Gautsch von Frankenborn	Rudolf Hug
12	1889	Čáslav	Čáslav, Mladá Boleslav	51st	26th	IX	Oskar Esch	Emil Pohl, Josef Dokoupil	Franz Großauer, Franz Weinbacher, Hermann Jellinek
13	1889	Olomouc, III Bn. Šumperk	Olomouc, Šumperk	92nd	46th	I	Emil Wank	Josef Baranowski, Franz Lindner, Friedrich Ritter von Stępski	Gustav Illić, Julius Kuczera, August Ritter von Panzera, Adolf Buchsbaum
14	1889	Brno, II Bn. Jihlava	Brno, Jihlava	26th	13th	II	Gustav Ritter von Zygadłowicz	I Generalstabskorps Karl Stutz, Oskar Waßhuber, Eduard Rott	Rudolf Steinbrecher, Franz Tippelt
15	1889	Opava, III Bn. Mährisch-Weißkirchen	Opava, Olomouc	92nd	46th	I	Emil Pattay Edler von Ključ	Konrad Pikolka	Theodor Piekhart, Emil Pohlenz, Johann Mohelský
16	1889	Kraków	Kraków, Wadowice	91st	46th	I	Heinrich Freiherr von Dürfeld	Ludwig Zawada, Ludwig Freisinger, Karl Prettner	Alexander Edler von Karchesy, Adolf Meindl, Eduar Müller
17	1889	Rzeszów	Rzeszów	90th	45th	X	Edmund Lober Edler von Karstenrod	Moritz Löwenstein	Karl Nikodem, Karl Kunzek, Josef Sittenberger
18	1889	Przemyśl	Przemyśl, Sanok	89th	45th	X	Eduard Bezdiczka	Col. Robert Pluhard von Ulogponte; Lt. Col. Franz Kraliček, Karl Lindinger	Hugo Reichel, Ignaz Pick, Viktore Jarosz
19	1889	Lemberg	Lemberg, Berezhany	85th	43rd	XI	Karl Jent	Johann Opletal, Franz Springinsfeld	Rudolf Thom, Alexander Süss, Franz Paulik, Kajetan Amirowicz, Miecislaus Linde
20	1889	Stanislau	Stanislau, Berezhany and Czortków	85th	43rd	XI	Anton Kosel	Adolf Flecker, Josef Otter, Emanuel Hohenauer	Maximilian Preier, Otto Schreyer
21	1889	Sankt Pölten	St. Pölten, Vienna B	87th	44th	XIV	Eduard Edler von Dietrich	Josef Vizthum, Heribert Marchesani	Franz Sax, Josef Koch, Johann Lentsch, Gottfried Koch, Johann Ritter von Wróblewski
22	1889	Czernowitz	Czernowitz,Kolomea	86th	43rd	III	Alois Göttl		
23	1893	Zara	Sebenico	5th Mtn.	18th Inf. Div.	XVI	Alfred Plesskot		
24	1900	Vienna	Vienna B,Znojmo	25th	13th	II	Otto Richter		
25	1900	Kroměříž	Kroměříž	26th	13th	II	Karl Mader		
26	1901	Marburg	Marburg, Cilli	43rd	22nd	III	Wenzel Schönauer		
27 [B]	1901	Laibach	Laibach, Triest	44th	23rd	III	Karl Zahradniczek		
28	1899	Písek	Písek, Jindřichův Hradec,Benešov	42nd	21st	VIII	Josef Fiedler		
29	1899	České Budějovice	České Budějovice, Písek	42nd	21st	XVII	Johann Wurja		
30	1899	Vysoké Mýto	Vysoké Mýto, Hradec Králové	51st	26th	IX	Rudolf Kasel		
31	1901	Teschen	Teschen, Wadowice	91st	46th	I	Emil Maculan		
32	1901	Neusandez	Neusandez, Tarnów	91st	46th	I	Silvester Edler von Lucanović		
33	1901	Stryj	Stryj, Sambor	89th	45th	X	Ludwig Hromatka		
34	1901	Jaroslau	Jaroslau,Gródek Jagiellonski	90th	45th	X	Ferdinand Wlaschütz		
35	1898	Zloczów	Zloczów,Tarnopol	85th	43rd	XI	Alfred Regenermel		
36	1899	Kolomea	Kolomea, Stanislau, Czortków	86th	43rd	III	Adalbert Dobija		
37	1906	Gravosa	Castelnuovo	4th Mtn.	18th Inf. Div.	XVI	Franz Grossmann		

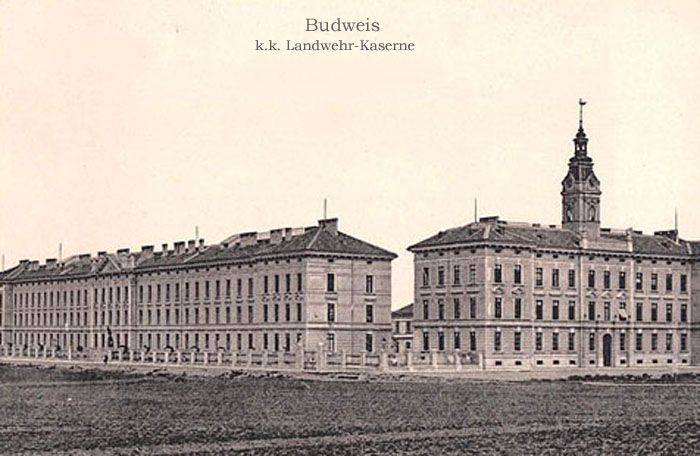
Landwehr barracks in České Budějovice

[A] - The 4th Infantry belonged to the Imperial-Royal Mountain Corps. From 11 April 1917 it was called the 1st Imperial-Royal Mountain Rifle Regiment. Contrary to Landwehr dress regulations it wore uniform based on the pattern of the State Rifles with an edelweiss on the collar, but with a number 4 above the hunting horn on their caps instead of the Tyrolean eagle.
[B] The 27th Infantry belonged to the Imperial-Royal Mountain Corps. From 11 April 1917 it was retitled to the 2nd Imperial-Royal Mountain Rifle Regiment. Contrary to Landwehr dress regulations it wore uniform based on the pattern of the State Rifles with an edelweiss on the collar, but with a number 27 on the hunting horn on their caps instead of the Tyrolean eagle.

Landwehr Regiments and their composition by nationality
№	Garrison	By nationality								
№	Garrison	German	Czech	Slovene	Italian	Croats/ Serbs	Poles	Ruthenians	Romanian	Other
1	Vienna (Staff - XIII District HütteldorferStr. 188), 48°11′49″N 16°17′7″E	95%	_	_	_	_	_	_	_	5%
2	Linz	98%	_	_	_	_	_	_	_	2%
3	Graz, II Bn. Leoben	94%	_	_	_	_	_	_	_	6%
4	Klagenfurt, II, III Bns. Hermagor	79%	_	_	_	_	_	_	_	21%
5	Pola	_	_	45%	20%	22%	_	_	_	8%
6	Eger	97%	_	_	_	_	_	_	_	3%
7	Plzeň, III Bn. Rokycany	30%	60%	_	_	_	_	_	_	10%
8	Prague	_	95%	_	_	_	_	_	_	5%
9	Litoměřice, III Bn. Chomutov	86%	_	_	_	_	_	_	_	14%
10	Mladá Boleslav, III Bn. Turnov	_	95%	_	_	_	_	_	_	5%
11	Jičín, III Bn. Jaroměř	36%	63%	_	_	_	_	_	_	1%
12	Čáslav	_	87%	_	_	_	_	_	_	13%
13	Olomouc, III Bn. Šumperk	31%	64%	_	_	_	_	_	_	5%
14	Brno, II Bn. Jihlava	31%	67%	_	_	_	_	_	_	2%
15	Opava, III Bn. Mährisch-Weißkirchen	82%	_	_	_	_	_	_	_	18%
16	Kraków	_	_	_	_	_	82%	_	_	18%
17	Rzeszów	_	_	_	_	_	97%	_	_	3%
18	Przemyśl	_	_	_	_	_	43%	47%	_	10%
19	Lemberg	_	_	_	_	_	31%	59%	_	10%
20	Stanislau	_	_	_	_	_	_	72%	_	28%
21	Sankt Pölten	98%	_	_	_	_	_	_	_	2%
22	Czernowitz	_	_	_	_	_	_	27%	54%	19%
23	Zara	_	_	_	_	82%	_	_	_	18%
24	Vienna	97%	_	_	_	_	_	_	_	3%
25	Kroměříž	_	83%	_	_	_	_	_	_	17%
26	Marburg	77%	_	_	_	_	_	_	_	23%
27	Laibach	_	_	86%	_	_	_	_	_	14%
28	Písek	20%	79%	_	_	_	_	_	_	1%
29	České Budějovice	54%	45%	_	_	_	_	_	_	1%
30	Vysoké Mýto	28%	68%	_	_	_	_	_	_	4%
31	Teschen	37%	33%	_	_	_	27%	_	_	1%
32	Neusandez	_	_	_	_	_	91%	_	_	9%
33	Stryj	_	_	_	_	_	_	73%	_	27%
34	Jaroslau	_	_	_	_	_	75%	_	_	25%
35	Zloczów	_	_	_	_	_	25%	68%	_	9%
36	Kolomea	_	_	_	_	_	21%	70%	_	9%
37	Gravosa	_	_	_	_	82%	_	_	_	8%

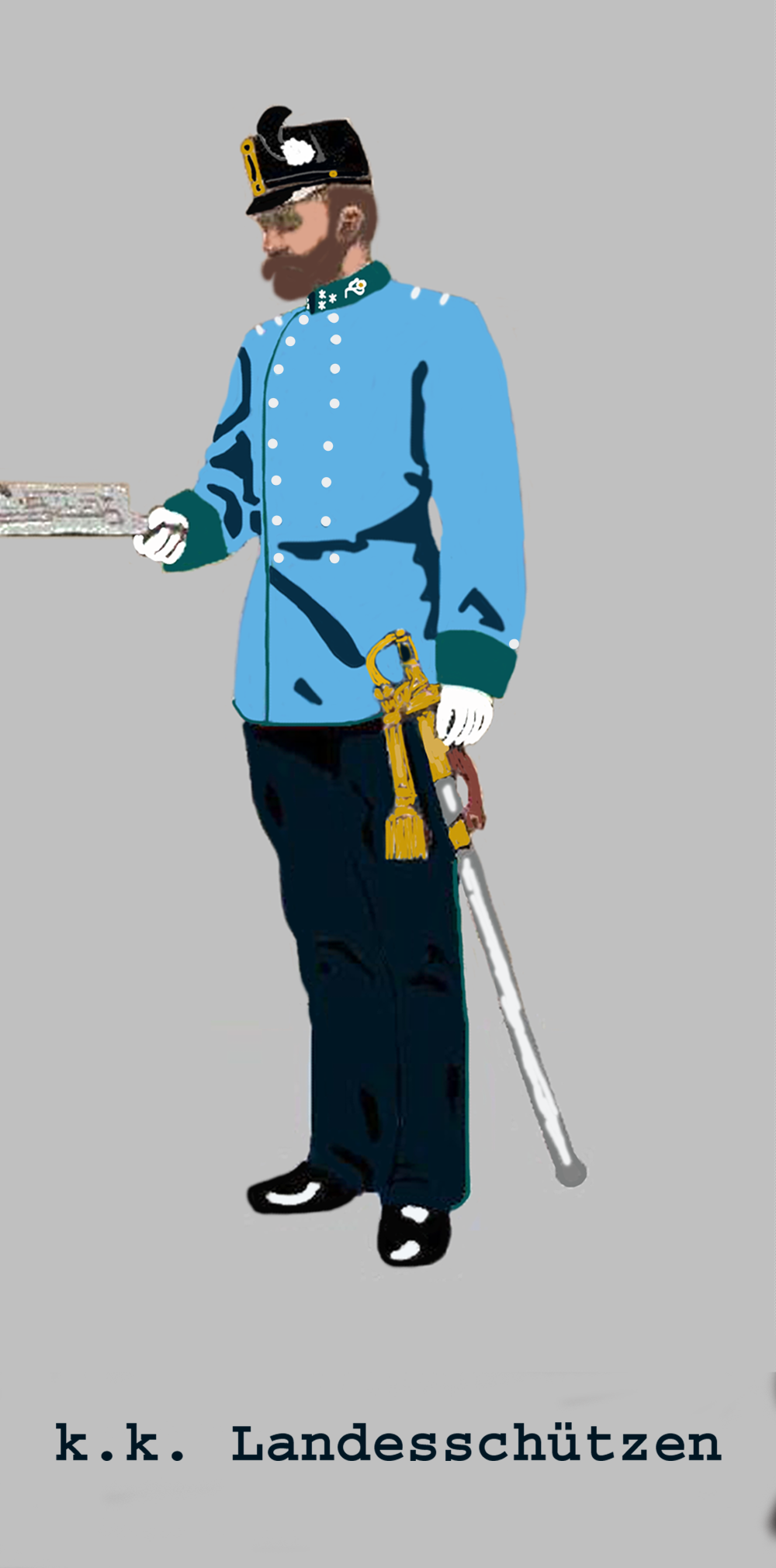
State Rifles officer in working/service dress

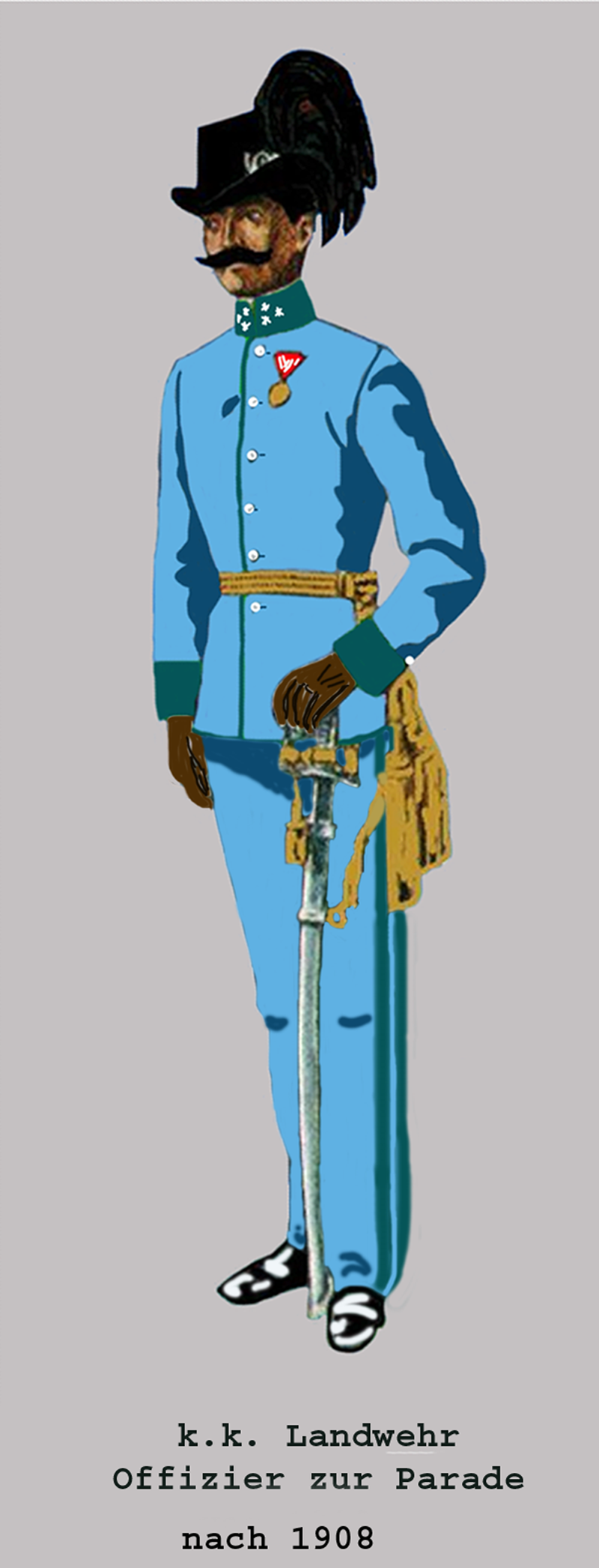
Landwehr captain after 1908 in parade dress

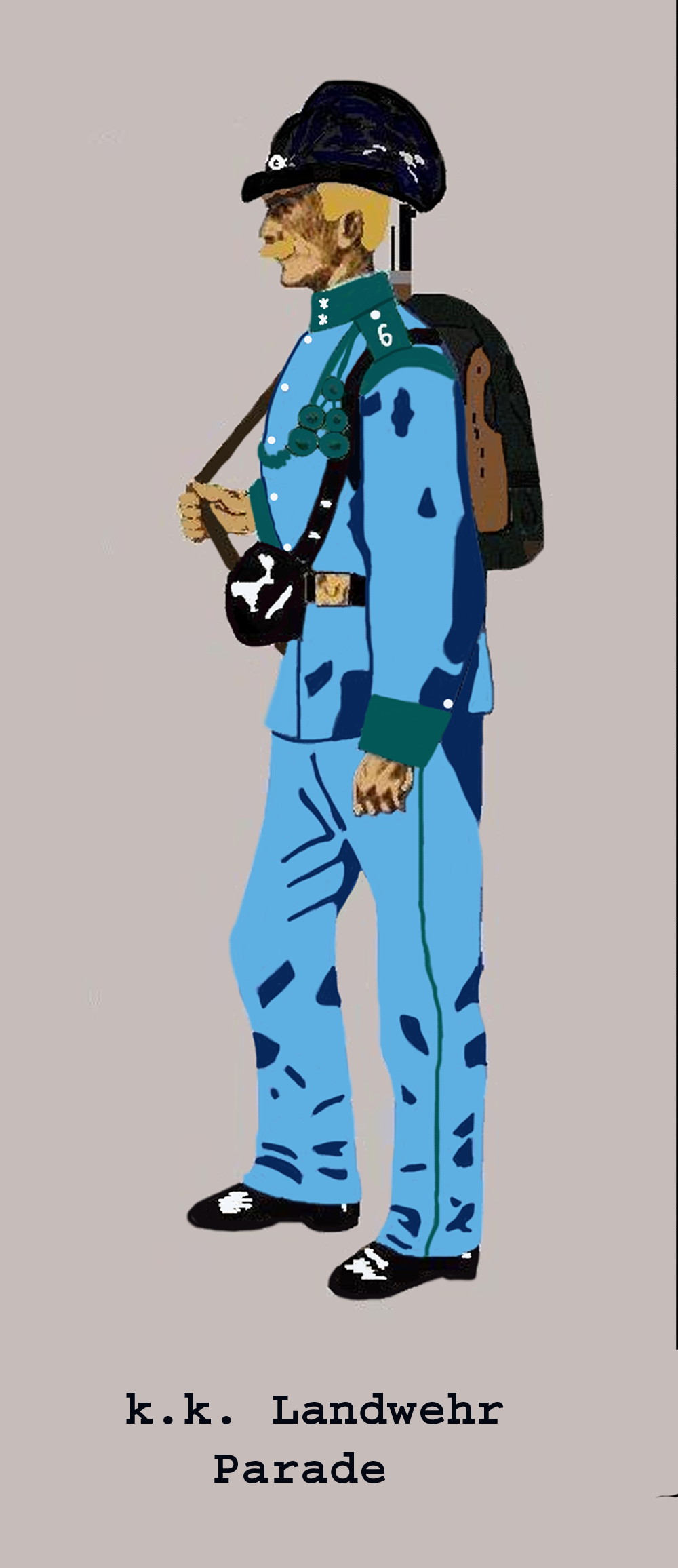
Landwehr infantryman of 6th Regt in parade dress

=== State rifle regiments ===
From 1906 the state rifles became the Imperial-Royal Mountain Corps and were renamed the Kaiserschützen ("Emperor's Rifles") in 1917. They were given various titles depending on the period.

- 1st Imperial-Royal State Rifle Regiment (Trient) (k.k. Landesschützen-Regiment „Trient“ Nr. I)
- 2nd Imperial-Royal State Rifle Regiment (Bozen) (k.k. Landesschützen-Regiment „Bozen“ Nr. II)
- 3rd Imperial-Royal State Rifle Regiment (Innichen) (k.k. Landesschützen-Regiment „Innichen“ Nr. III)

=== Dress ===
Landwehr infantry wore the hat of the rifle corps (Jägertruppe) as their parade headdress: a matt black hat of waterproof felt. It consisted of the crown and brim adorned with a hatband of green cord, a hunting horn and a hackle or plume of black cock feathers. The hat cord was made of sheep's wool, had a button and, at each end, an acorn covered with green wool and braided at the ends. The two acorns were attached to the rear of the hat crown. The cord for officers was made of interwoven black and gold thread.

The crown was in the shape of an oval cone, with a slight dent at the top. The brim was flat in front and behind, but "snapped up" on both sides. The brim was edged with black, varnished calfskin.

On the left side of the crown, there was a rearward, tilted socket for attaching the hackle. The hat badge - of gold-coloured metal - was a hunting horn. The battalion number in nickel silver was set in the centre formed by the loop of the horn. The badge was fastened over the socket for the feathers so that the number was inclined at the same angle as the socket. The hackle was formed in the shape of a rooster's tail around a 1.5 mm thick piece of steel wire. The length of the hackle was 29 cm. The hackle was inserted into the socket on the hat such that the feathers were swept back in an arc.

On the march the Landwehr used the normal infantry field cap (Feldkappe).

The uniform jacket (Waffenrock) of the Landwehr infantry - for officers and men - was on average the same as that of the infantry. The other ranks jacket was made of pike grey (hechtgrau) cloth with epaulettes, shoulder trim, collar and cuffs of grass-green colour. The buttons for all regiments were white and marked with the battalion number.

The shirts worn by the Landwehr infantry were of the same colour as the jacket with grass-green gorget patches to indicate their arm of service. Their remaining usual items of dress were no different from those of the line infantry.

Trousers were of pike grey cloth and cut long in accordance with the regulations for German regiments. The trousers of the officers had grass-green lampasses; NCOs and other ranks had grass-green piping along the side seam.

Dress variations for 4th and 27th Infantry The uniforms of the 4th and 27th Infantry were an exception to the Landwehr infantry regulations; instead, they had the same dress pattern as the State Rifles.

The parade hat was no different from that of the Landwehr infantry and, in marching order, they used the infantry field cap. One special feature was a small, forward-sloping pocket on the left side of the cap into which a spray of black grouse feathers was fixed. On individual hats the feathers could be fixed directly to the cap in order that the white feathers could be displayed to best effect.

The uniform jacket of the two regiments was, like the State Rifles jackets - both for officers and men - cut in two rows unlike the infantry and had two rows each of eight silver buttons. The buttons bore the regimental number in Arabic numerals. The soldiers' jackets were made of pike grey material and had grass-green epaulettes, shoulder bars, collars and cuffs. On the collars there was a matt white edelweiss on each side, behind the rank badge (Distinktionsabzeichen).

The rifleman's shirt was the same colour as his jacket; the arm of service being signified by grass-green gorgets (Parolis). There were also other differences in the uniform compared with that of the infantry units of the Imperial and Royal Army.

The trousers were the same pattern as those of the Landwehr infantry.

- See also: Imperial-Royal Mountain Troops

== Cavalry ==
=== Mounted State Rifles ===
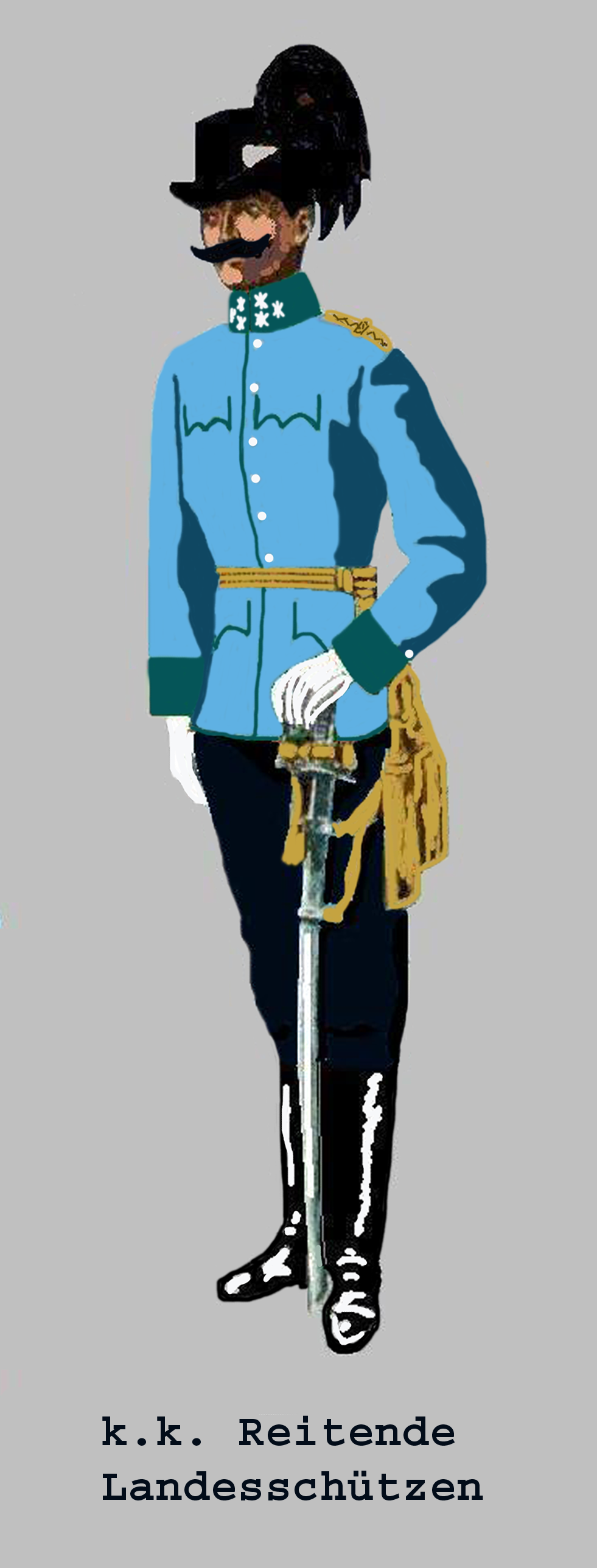
Imperial-Royal Mounted State Rifles

- Imperial-Royal Mounted Tyrolean State Rifle Division (k.k. Reitende Tiroler Landesschützen Division)

1st Landwehr Cavalry Brigade (Wels) – 44th Landwehr Infantry Division
Allocated as liaison cavalry:
1st Squadron to 88th Landwehr Infantry Brigade – 44th Landwehr Infantry Division
2nd Squadron to 21st Landsturm Infantry Regiment – 108th Landsturm Infantry Brigade – 11th Honvéd Cavalry Division
3rd Squadron to 88th Landwehr Infantry Brigade – 44th Landwehr Infantry Division
Nationalities: 58 % German – 38 % Tyrol-Italians – 4 % Other
Established: 1872
Garrison: Trento
Recruiting District: Innsbruck and Prague
Commanding Officer: Lieutenant Colonel Moritz Graf von Srnka

- Imperial-Royal Mounted Dalmatian State Rifle Division (k.k. Reitende Dalmatiner Landesschützen Division)

Allocated as liaison cavalry:
1 troop, 1 Sqn, to 4th Mountain Brigade – 18th Infantry Division
1 troop, 1 Sqn, to 2nd Mountain Brigade
1 troop, 1 Sqn, to 14th Mountain Brigade – 47th Infantry Division
1 troop, 2 Sqn, to 5th Mountain Brigade – 18th Infantry Division
1 troop to 18th Infantry Division
2 troops to 40th Honved Infantry Division
Nationalities: 82 % Serb/Croat – 18 % other
Established: 1874
Garrison: Sinj
Commanding Officer: Lieutenant Colonel Julius Stöger-Steiner

== Museum coverage ==
The history of Austro-Hungarian forces is documented in detail in the Military History Museum in Vienna, which was founded by Emperor Franz Joseph I as the Imperial-Royal Court Armaments Museum (k.k. Hofwaffenmuseum). In a special display cabinet in Hall V (the Franz Joseph Hall) of the museum, several uniforms of the Imperial Royal Landwehr are displayed, a relief on the rear of the cabinet shows the territories from which the Hungarian Honvéd and Imperial-Royal Landwehr recruited.

== Literature ==
- Heinz von Lichem: Spielhahnstoß und Edelweiß – die Friedens- und Kriegsgeschichte der Tiroler Hochgebirgstruppe „Die Kaiserschützen“ von ihren Anfängen bis 1918. Leopold Stocker Verlag, Graz, 1977. ISBN 3-7020-0260-X.
- Heinz von Lichem: Der Tiroler Hochgebirgskrieg 1915–1918. Steiger Verlag, Berwang (Tyrol), 1985. ISBN 3-85423-052-4.
- Anton Graf Bossi Fedregotti: Kaiserjäger – Ruhm und Ende: nach dem Kriegstagebuch des Oberst von Cordier. Stocker Verlag, Graz, 1977. ISBN 3-7020-0263-4.
- Carl Freiherr von Bardolff: Soldat im alten Österreich – Erinnerungen aus meinem Leben. Diederichs Verlag, Jena, 1938.
- Johann Christoph Allmayer-Beck, Erich Lessing: Die K.(u.)K. Armee 1848–1918. Bertelsmann Verlag, Munich, 1974.
- Oskar Brüch, Günter Dirrheimer: Das k. u. k. Heer 1895 (= Schriften des Heeresgeschichtlichen Museums in Wien (Militärwissenschaftliches Institut), Band 10), Stocker Verlag, Graz, 1997. ISBN 3-7020-0783-0.
- Rest, Ortner, Ilmig: Des Kaisers Rock im 1. Weltkrieg – Uniformierung und Ausrüstung der österreichisch-ungarischen Armee von 1914 bis 1918. Verlag Militaria, Vienna, 2002. ISBN 3-9501642-0-0.
- Andreas Danner, Martin Prieschl, Johannes Heubel, Für Gott, Kaiser und Oberösterreich - das k.k. Landwehrinfanterieregiment Linz Nro. 2, in: 50 Jahre Wiedererrichtung Garnison Ried - Tapfer, standhaft und treu, Ried im Innkreis 2008, pp. 142 – 144;
- Thomas Reichl: Die österreichische Landwehr 1809, in: Viribus Unitis. Jahresbericht des Heeresgeschichtlichen Museums 2009, Vienna, 2009, ISBN 978-3-902551-15-3
- k.u.k. Kriegsministerium: Dislokation und Einteilung des k.u.k. Heeres, der k.u.k. Kriegsmarine, der k.k. Landwehr und der k.u. Landwehr in: Seidel's kleines Armeeschema, Hrsg. Seidel & Sohn, Vienna, 1914
- k.u.k. Kriegsministerium: Adjustierungsvorschrift für das k.u.k. Heer, die k.k. Landwehr, die k.u. Landwehr, die verbundenen Einrichtungen und das Korps der Militärbeamten, Vienna, 1911/1912
