= Austrian Minister of Defence (Austria-Hungary) =

Defence ministry of Austria-Hungary (1868–1918)

The Austrian Minister of Defence was head of the Ministerium für Landesverteidigung (Ministry for National Defence) or Landwehrministerium. It was set up in 1868 with responsibility for the armed forces and militia in the Cisleithanian half of the Dual Monarchy of Austria-Hungary. It was succeeded in 1918 by the Ministry of Defence of the First Austrian Republic.

After the defeat in the Austro-Prussian War, Emperor Franz Joseph I was forced in 1866/1867 to concede partial sovereignty to Hungary, which had been engaged in passive resistance since the failed secession attempt in 1849, with the Austro-Hungarian Compromise of 1867, and to reorganize the monarchy, which had until then been administered on a unitary basis, into the Dual-Monarchy. The new position of Hungary as a part of the monarchy equal with Austria comprised the right of the Hungarian part to establish their own territorial armed forces after 1867, the k.u. Landwehr (Hungarian:Magyar Király Honvédség). In consequence, the Cisleithanian government also began to set up a territorial army - the k.k. Landwehr after 1868. Thus, there co-existed in Austria-Hungary three armies de jure independent of each other, of which however the common army (Gemeinsame Armee) was the most important, as it was the largest by far. Apart from the Austrian Ministry for National Defence, there were also:

- the Imperial and Royal Ministry of War (Austria-Hungary), responsible for the "joint army" (Gemeinsame Armee) and the Imperial and Royal War Navy
- the Royal Hungarian Honvéd Ministry, responsible for the Royal Hungarian Defence Force, with the attached "Croatian-Slavonic Defence Force"

In the 1880s the defence ministry reluctantly agreed to Gemeinsame Armee chief of the general staff Friedrich von Beck-Rzikowsky's proposal that the k.k. Landwehr be permitted to carry out general military service, rather than being restricted to home defence.

== See also ==
- Supreme commanders of the Imperial and Royal Armed Forces
- Minister of War (Austria-Hungary)
- Ministry of National Defence and Sport (Austria)
- List of Defense Ministers of Austria
- Austro-Hungarian General Staff
- Chief of the General Staff (Austria)
