= Ferdinand von Bauer =

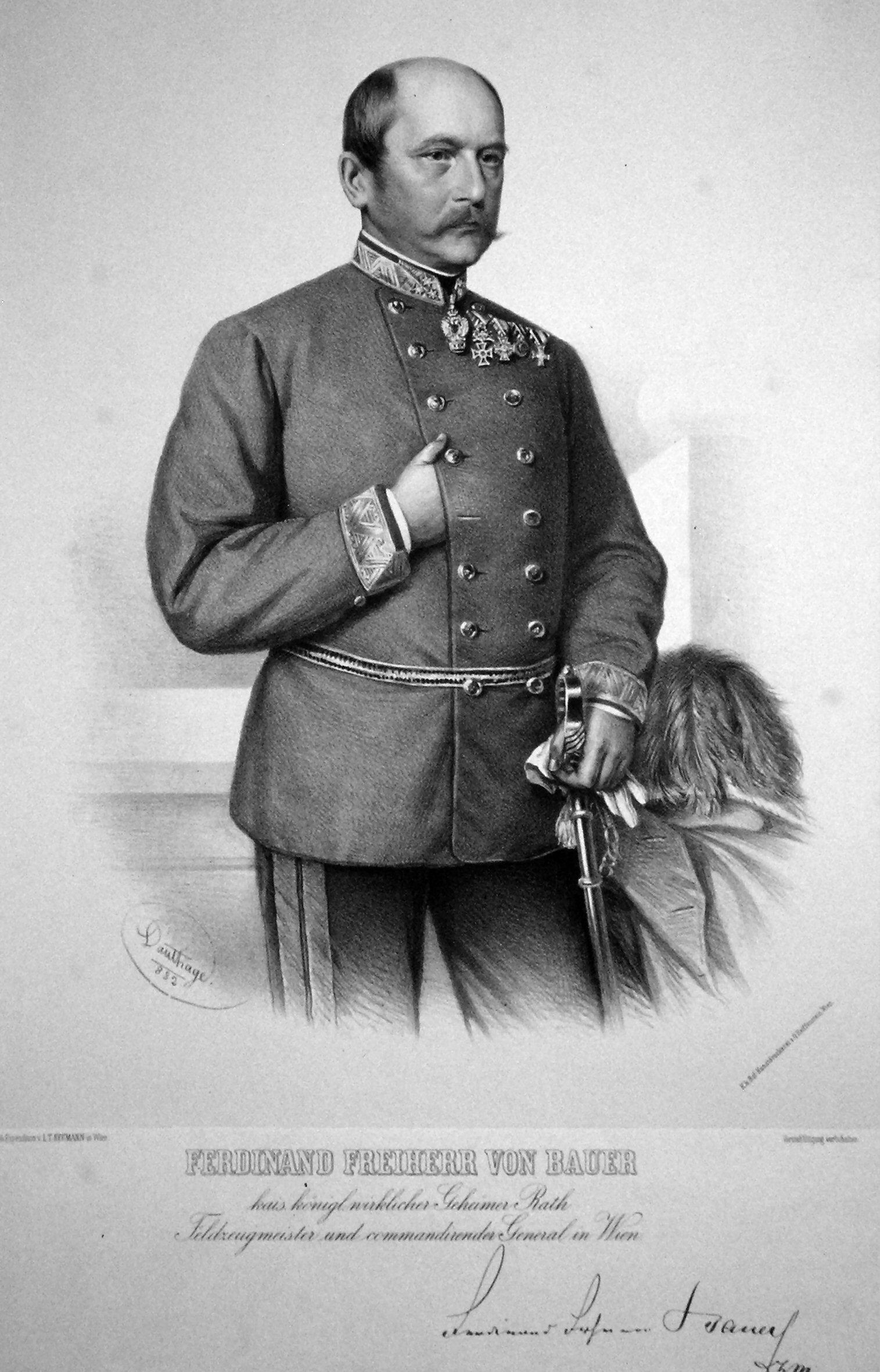
Ferdinand von Bauer, Lithograph by Adolf Dauthage, 1882

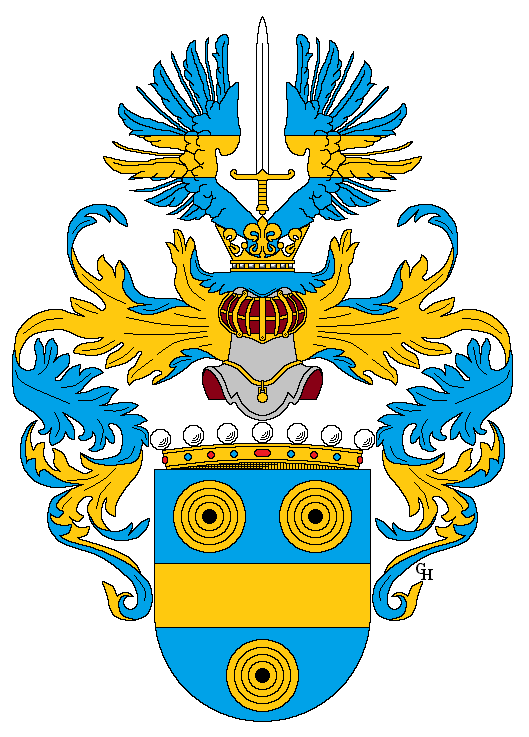
Coat of arms granted to Bauer on his elevation to Freiherr status, 1881

Ferdinand von Bauer, born Ferdinand Bauer (7 March 1825 - 22 July 1893) was a general of the Austro-Hungarian Common Army and the Imperial and Royal Minister of War from 1888 until his death in 1893.

== Life ==
Ferdinand Bauer enrolled in the Imperial and Royal academy of engineers in 1836, was commissioned as a lieutenant in the corps of engineers in 1841, and was placed on active service as a Hauptmann in 1848. In 1849 he fought for the Habsburgs in the Hungarian Revolution. He was promoted to major in 1859 and fought as a brigade commander in the Third Italian War of Independence.

From 1869 to 1871, Bauer was garrison commander at Temeswar and between 1878 and 1881 he was military commander at Hermannstadt (both in modern Romania). Then he served as Commander-General in Vienna until 1888. In 1881 we was appointed General of the Artillery and given command of the 84th Infantry Regiment. On 16 March 1888, Bauer was named as Imperial and Royal Minister of War.

Bauer died "unexpectedly after a short illness" on 22 July 1893. His funeral procession from the Imperial and Royal Ministry of War (now Am Hof 2) to the Augartenbrücke took place on 25 July 1893, with Emperor Franz Joseph I in attendance. From the Augartenbrücke his coffin was taken to the k.k. Nordbahnhof and from there to his family crypt in Lemberg (now Lviv in Ukraine).

== Awards and honours ==
- Military Merit Cross for his personal valour at the Battle of Solferino, 1859.
- Knight's Cross of the Order of Leopold for his personal valour at the Battle of Custoza, 1866.
- Order of the Iron Crown 2nd class and, on request, promotion to Freiherr status, 1878.
- Knight of the Order of the Iron Crown, 1st class, 1884.
- Great Cross of the Order of Leopold, 1887

== Bibliography ==
- Oscar Criste (1902). "Bauer, Ferdinand Freiherr von" . Allgemeine Deutsche Biographie (in German). Vol. 46. Leipzig: Duncker & Humblot. pp. 237–239.
- "Bauer Ferdinand Frh. von". In: Österreichisches Biographisches Lexikon 1815–1950 (ÖBL). Vol. 1, Austrian Academy of Sciences, Vienna 1957, p. 55.
