= Minister of War (Austria-Hungary) =

Government minister in Austria-Hungary

- K.u.k. Kriegsminister (German); cs. és k. hadügyminiszter (Hungarian)
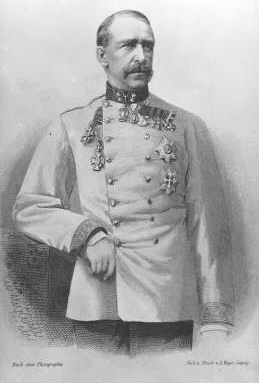
- Longest serving Artur Maximilian von Bylandt-Rheidt; 20 June 1876–16 March 1888
- War Ministry
- Type: Minister
- Reports to: Emperor of Austria
- Seat: Ringstraße, Vienna
- Appointer: Emperor of Austria
- Precursor: Hofkriegsrat
- Formation: 21 December 1867
- First holder: Franz von John
- Final holder: Rudolf Stöger-Steiner von Steinstätten
- Abolished: 11 November 1918
- Superseded by: Minister of Defense

The Imperial and Royal Minister of War (German: K.u.k. Kriegsminister; Hungarian: cs. és k. hadügyminiszter), until 1911: Reich Minister of War (Reichskriegsminister; birodalmi hadügyminiszter), was the head of one of the three common ministries shared by the two states which made up the dual monarchy of Austria-Hungary from its creation in the Compromise of 1867 until its dissolution in 1918.

The Common Austro-Hungarian Army (Gemeinsame Armee) and the Austro-Hungarian Navy (K.u.k. Kriegsmarine) were institutions shared by the constituent parts of the dual monarchy, although both Austria and Hungary possessed their own defence ministries charged with the internal administration of the homeland troops (that is, the K.k. Landwehr and Magyar Királyi Honvédség), known as the K.k. Ministerium für Landesverteidigung and K.u. Honvédministerium respectively.

== Ministers ==
According to the Delegation Law of 21 December 1867, the Minister of War, together with the Minister of Finance and the Minister of the Imperial and Royal House and of the Exterior formed the Council of Ministers for Common Affairs under the direction of the Foreign Minister. The three Imperial and Royal ministers were appointed and relieved from office by the Emperor of Austria and King of Hungary himself.

Until 1911, the ministers were called Reich Ministers of War. Upon the accession of Moritz von Auffenberg, following Hungarian requests not to be summarized under an Austrian realm that did not consist of the Hungarian lands at that time, the ministers were called Imperial and Royal (k.u.k.) Ministers of War.

List:

No.	Portrait	Minister	Took office	Left office	Time in office
1	Franz von John	Lieutenant Field Marshal; Franz von John (1815–1876)	21 December 1867	18 January 1868	28 days
2	Franz Kuhn von Kuhnenfeld	Lieutenant Field Marshal; Franz Kuhn von Kuhnenfeld (1817–1896)	18 January 1868	14 June 1874	6 years, 147 days
3	Alexander von Koller	General of the Cavalry; Alexander von Koller (1813–1890)	14 June 1874	20 June 1876	2 years, 6 days
4	Artur Maximilian von Bylandt-Rheidt	General of the Artillery; Artur Maximilian von Bylandt-Rheidt (1821–1891)	20 June 1876	16 March 1888	11 years, 270 days
5	Ferdinand von Bauer	General of the Artillery; Ferdinand von Bauer (1825–1893)	16 March 1888	24 July 1893	5 years, 130 days
–	Rudolf von Merkl	General of the Artillery; Rudolf von Merkl (1831–1911); Acting	24 July 1893	22 September 1893	60 days
6	Edmund von Krieghammer	General of the Cavalry; Edmund von Krieghammer (1832–1906)	22 September 1893	17 December 1902	9 years, 86 days
7	Heinrich von Pitreich [de]	General of the Artillery; Heinrich von Pitreich (1841–1920)	18 December 1902	24 October 1906	3 years, 310 days
8	Franz Xaver von Schönaich [de]	General of the Infantry; Franz Xaver von Schönaich (1844–1916)	24 October 1906	20 September 1911	4 years, 331 days
9	Moritz von Auffenberg	General of the Infantry; Moritz von Auffenberg (1852–1928)	20 September 1911	12 December 1912	1 year, 83 days
10	Alexander von Krobatin	Field Marshal; Alexander von Krobatin (1849–1933)	12 December 1912	12 April 1917	4 years, 121 days
11	Rudolf Stöger-Steiner von Steinstätten	Colonel General; Rudolf Stöger-Steiner von Steinstätten (1861–1921)	12 April 1917	11 November 1918	1 year, 213 days

The influence of the Austro-Hungarian War Minister was limited, due to the rivalry between the Austrian Minister-President and the Prime Minister of Hungary. Moreover, it was the Emperor who acted as commander-in-chief of the Imperial and Royal Armed Might, served by his personal military chancellery and represented by an Inspector General, a position held by Field Marshal Archduke Albert of Austria-Teschen from 1869 to 1895. His successor General of the Cavalry and Admiral Archduke Franz Ferdinand of Austria-Este in 1906 achieved the dismissal of Minister Pitreich and 76-year-old Chief of the General Staff Friedrich von Beck-Rzikowsky, who was replaced by Franz Ferdinand's confidant Field Marshal Lieutenant Franz Conrad von Hötzendorf. Dismissed in 1911 but again appointed together with Minister Alexander von Krobatin during the 1912 Balkan Wars, Conrad acted autonomously, being directly responsible to the emperor. In the 1914 July Crisis upon the assassination of Franz Ferdinand, he and Minister Krobatin declared the Austro-Hungarian armed forces 'prepared for war'.

On 30 October 1918, Emperor Charles I of Austria assigned the Naval command to the newly established Yugoslavian State of Slovenes, Croats and Serbs. After the Kingdom of Hungary left the real union with Austria the next day, the last Austro-Hungarian minister Stöger-Steiner had to supervise the liquidation of the remaining Cisleithanian troops. Upon the resignation of Emperor Charles on 12 November, he was answerable to an Army state secretary of the republican German-Austrian government under Chancellor Karl Renner. The 'War Ministry in Liquidation' was renamed 'Military Liquidation Agency' in 1920, when the Austrian Federal Ministry of the Army was established. It was not dissolved until 1931.

== The War Ministry ==
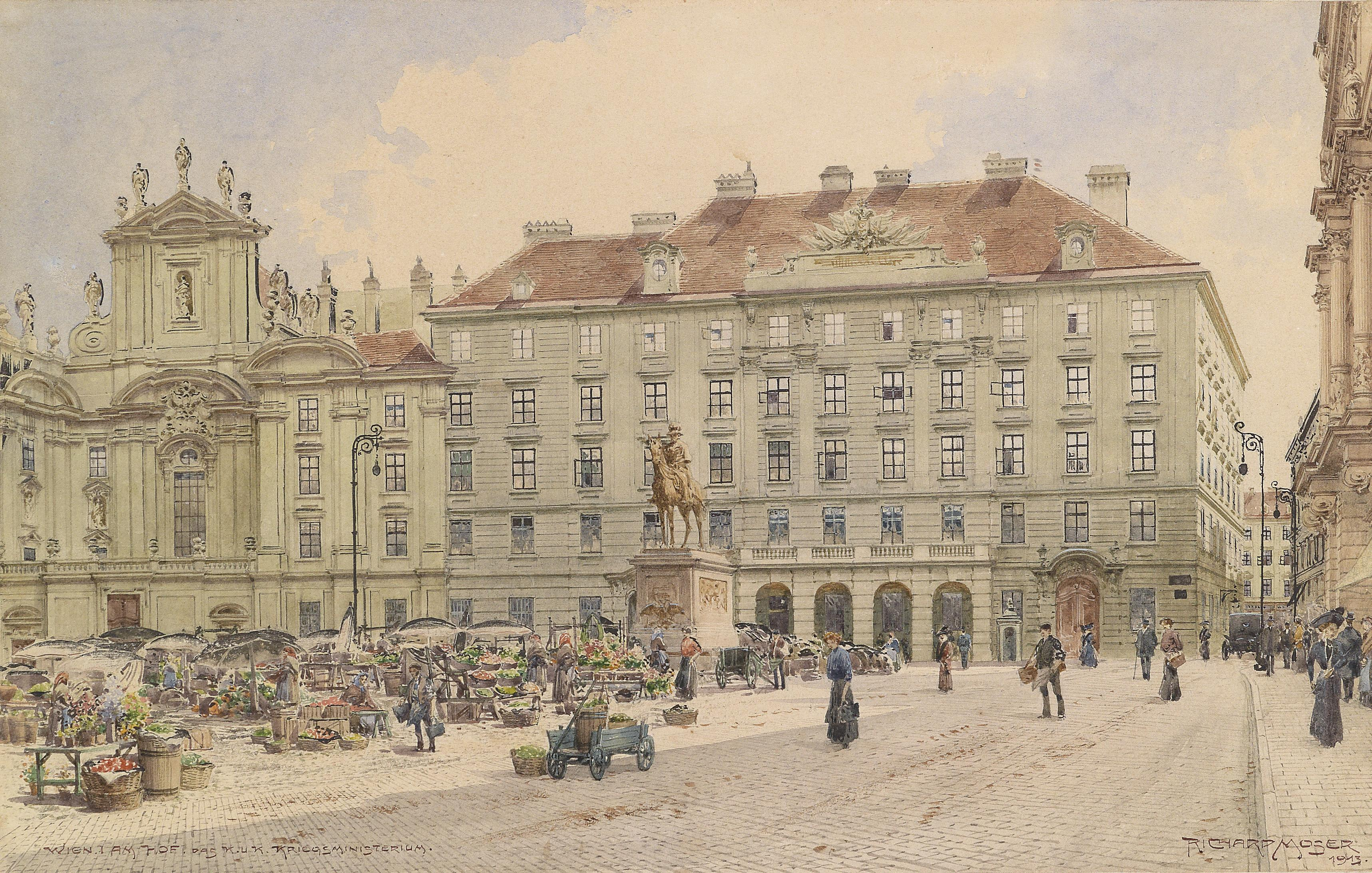
Austrian war ministry building, Am Hof, demolished in 1913

The Ministry initially was located at the historical seat of the Hofkriegsrat, the Court Council of War serving the Habsburg monarchs on Am Hof square in the central Innere Stadt borough of Vienna. After the Council's dissolution in the 1848 Revolution, the building had housed the War Ministry of the Austrian Empire; Minister Theodor Franz Baillet von Latour was lynched in front of it during the October Uprising.

From 1909 to 1913, the imposing Neoclassical Imperial and Royal War Ministry headquarters on Ringstraße boulevard, the department's final home, was erected according to plans designed by architect Ludwig Baumann, who had also built the Oriental Academy, the current US embassy. Dedicated on 1 May 1913 during the reign of Emperor Francis Joseph I and Minister Krobatin's tenure, it can still be seen in Vienna today; it is officially called Government Building (Regierungsgebäude) and is used as seat of the Minister for Economy, the Minister for Social Affairs and the Minister for Agriculture and Environment. In front of the ministry building Am Hof as well as, since 1913, of the existing building stands the equestrian monument of Field Marshal Joseph Radetzky, the most venerated military leader of the Austrian monarchy, designed by Kaspar von Zumbusch.

The Navy Section of the ministry (k.u.k. Marinesektion) had its own building at Vordere Zollamtsstrasse, corner of Marxergasse, behind the headquarters and is still existing, too. At the outside of this building the coats of arms of 16 Imperial and Royal ports on the Adriatic Coast are displayed.

== See also ==
- Supreme Commander of the Imperial and Royal Armed Forces
- Austrian Minister of Defence (Austria-Hungary)
- Minister of Defense (Austria)
- Austro-Hungarian General Staff
- Chief of the General Staff (Austria)
