= Imperial and Royal Dragoons =

Cavalry of the Austro-Hungarian Army from 1867 to 1914

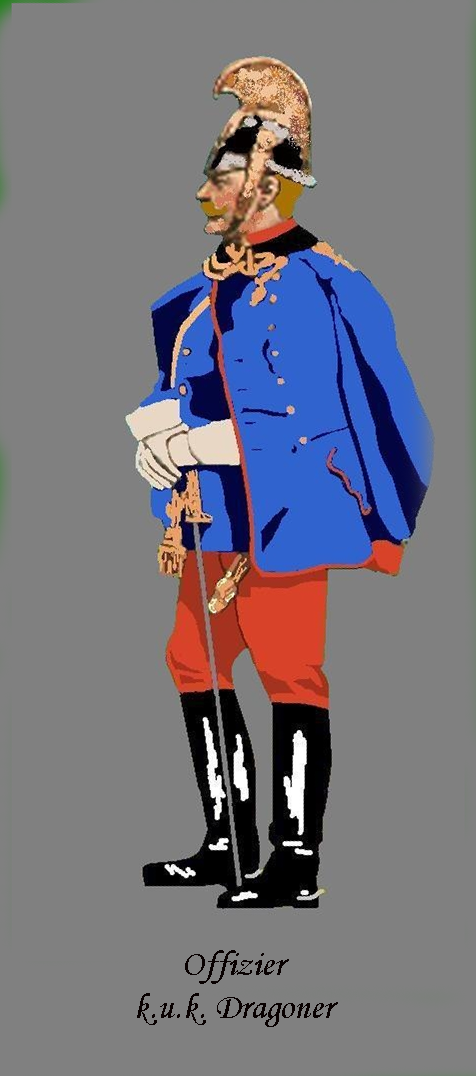
Dragoon officer in parade dress

Together with the Hussars and Uhlans, the Imperial and Royal Dragoons (German: k.u.k. Dragoner) made up the cavalry of the Austro-Hungarian Army from 1867 to 1914.

After 1867, Austria-Hungary had de facto three armies at the same time. This unique situation arose because the monarchy had been weakened by the losing the war against Prussia, and consequently had, in effect, to guarantee the autonomy of Kingdom of Hungary in the so-called Compromise of 15 March 1867. This led the Hungarian half of the Empire to immediately begin establishing its own army: the Royal Hungarian Honved (Hungarian: Magyar Királyi Honvédség). In response, the Cisleithanian half of the Empire also began to build its own army, the Imperial-Royal Landwehr. These two new forces thus existed alongside the Common Army (Gemeinsame Armee) that represented the empire as a whole.

However, unlike the hussars and uhlans, there were no dragoon units in either of the two Landwehrs.

== Organisation ==
The Common Army had 15 regiments of dragoons. By tradition, the dragoons recruited most of their troopers from the German- and Czech-speaking regions of the Empire. The regiments were all stationed in the Cisleithanian half of the Empire.

- The Imperial and Royal Cavalry Regiments were each made up of 2 divisions (battalions) each of 3 squadrons (Eskadronen)

== The Imperial and Royal Dragoons ==
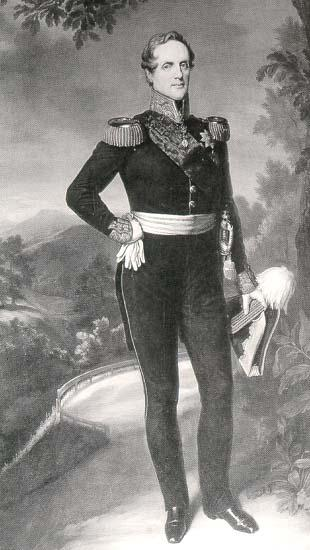
Colonel-in-chief of the 3rd Dragoons King Frederick Augustus of Saxony

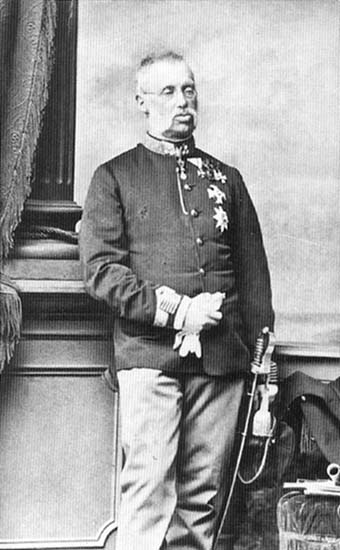
Archduke Albert K.H. Colonel-in-chief in perpetuity of the 9th Dragoons

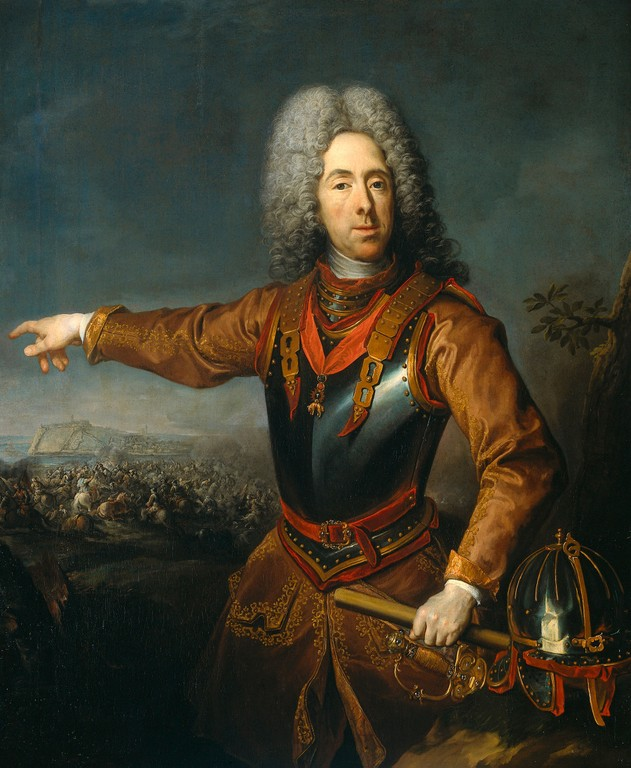
Colonel-in-chief in perpetuity of the 13th Dragoons FM Prinz Eugen

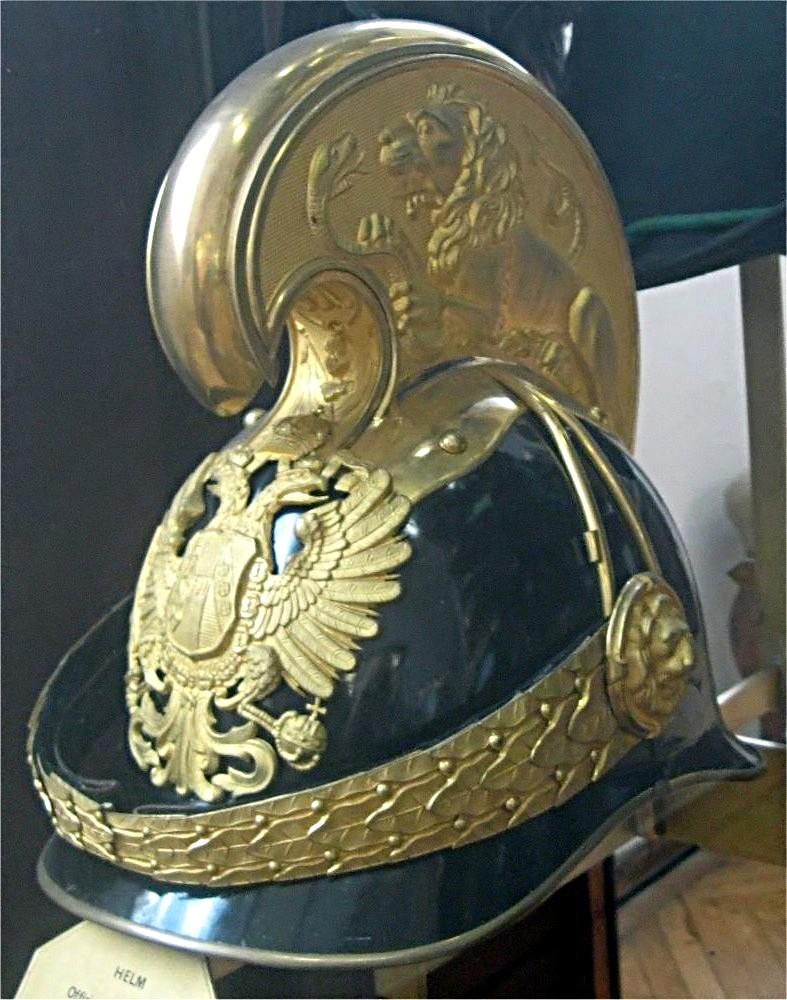
helmet of an officer of Imperial and Royal Dragoner

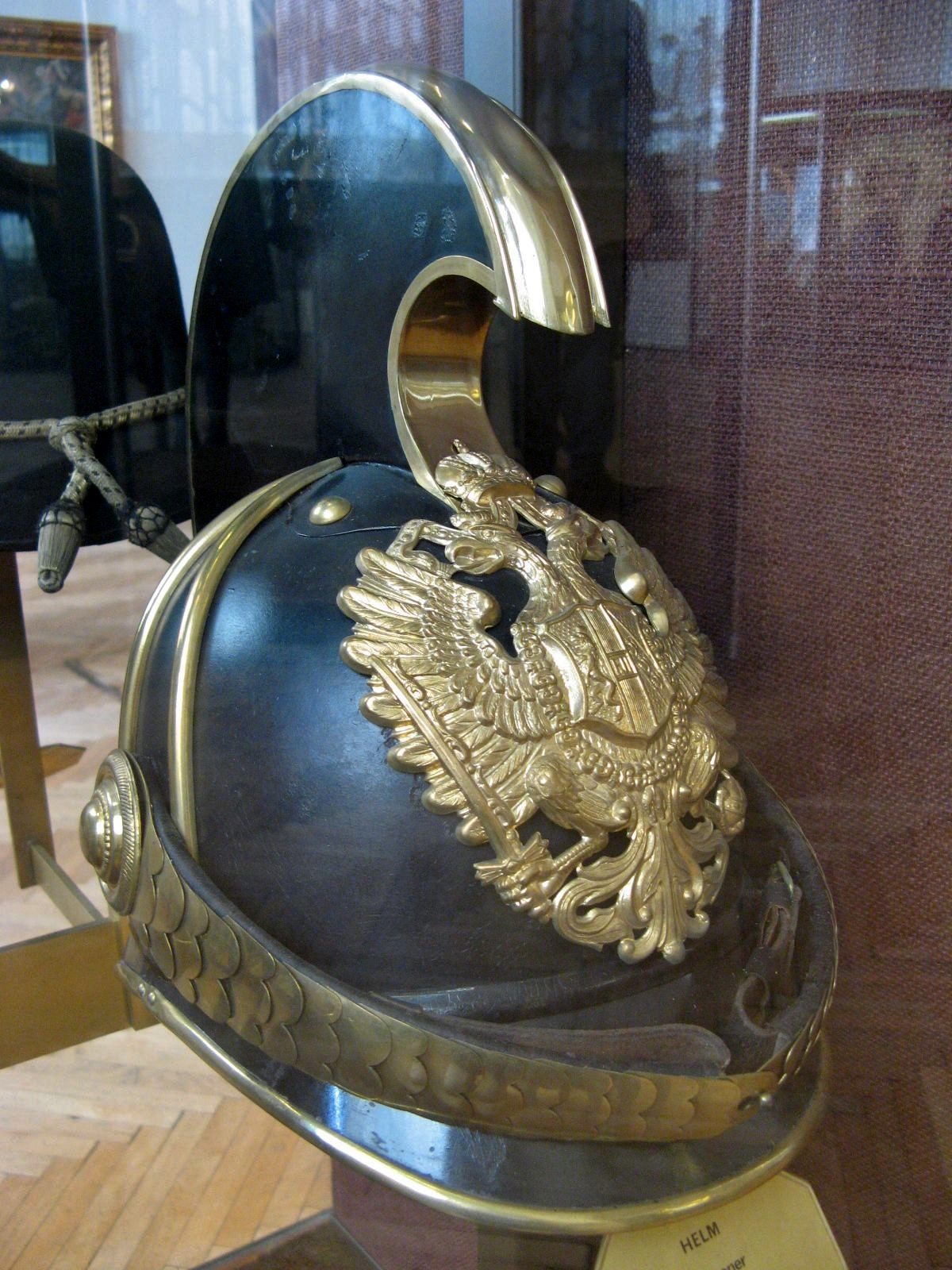
Helmet of an Imperial and Royal Dragoon

- 1st Bohemian Dragoons (Emperor Francis I's Own) (Böhmisches Dragoner-Regiment „Kaiser Franz I.“ Nr. 1)
- 2nd Bohemian Dragoons (Count of Paar's Own) (Böhmisches Dragoner-Regiment „Graf Paar“ Nr. 2)
- 3rd Lower Austrian Dragoons (Frederick Augustus King of Saxony's Own) (Niederösterreichisches Dragoner-Regiment „Friedrich August König von Sachsen“ Nr. 3)
- 4th Upper Austrian and Salzburg Dragoons (Emperor Ferdinand's Own) (Oberösterreichisch-Salzburgisches Dragoner-Regiment „Kaiser Ferdinand I.“ Nr. 4)
- 5th Styrian, Carinthian and Carniolan Dragoons (Nicholas I, Emperor of Russia's Own) (Steirisch-Kärntnerisch-Krainerisches Dragoner-Regiment „Nikolaus I. Kaiser von Rußland“ Nr. 5)
- 6th Moravian Dragoons (Frederick Francis, Grand Duke of Mecklenburg-Schwerin's Own) (Mährisches Dragoner-Regiment „Friedrich Franz IV. Großherzog von Mecklenburg-Schwerin“ Nr. 6)
- 7th Bohemian Dragoons (Duke of Lorraine's Own) (Böhmisches Dragoner-Regiment „Herzog von Lothringen“ Nr. 7)
- 8th Bohemian Dragoons (Count Montecuccoli's) (Böhmisches Dragoner-Regiment „Graf Montecuccoli“ Nr. 8)
- 9th Galician and Bukovina Dragoons (Archduke Albert's Own) (Galizisch-Bukowina'sches-Dragoner Regiment „Erzherzog Albrecht“ Nr. 9)
- 10th Bohemian Dragoons (Prince of Liechtenstein's Own) (Böhmisches Dragoner-Regiment „Fürst von Liechtenstein“ Nr. 10)
- 11th Moravian Dragoons (Emperor's Own) (Mährisches Dragoner-Regiment „Kaiser“ Nr. 11)
- 12th Bohemian Dragoons (Nicholas Nikolaevich, Grand Prince of Russia's Own) (Böhmisches Dragoner-Regiment „Nikolaus Nikolajewitsch Großfürst von Rußland“ Nr. 12)
- 13th Bohemian Dragoons (Eugen, Prince of Savoy's Own) (Böhmisches Dragoner-Regiment „Eugen Prinz von Savoyen“ Nr. 13)
- 14th Bohemian Dragoons (Prince of Windisch-Graetz's Own) (Böhmisches Dragoner-Regiment „Fürst zu Windisch-Graetz“ Nr. 14)
- 15th Lower Austria and Moravian Dragoons (Archduke Joseph's Own) (Niederösterreich-Mährisches Dragoner-Regiment „Erzherzog Joseph“ Nr. 15)

== Sources ==
- k.u.k. Kriegsministerium „Dislokation and Einteilung of the k.u.k Heeres, der k.u.k. Kriegsmarine, der k.k. Landwehr and der k.u. Landwehr“ in: Seidels kleines Armeeschema - Herausg.: Seidel & Sohn, Vienna, 1914
- * k.u.k. Kriegsministerium „Adjustierungsvorschrift für the k.u.k. Heer, the k.k. Landwehr, the k.u. Landwehr, the verbundenen Einrichtungen and the Korps der Militärbeamten“, Vienna, 1911
- Glenn Jewison, Jörg C. Steiner: The Austro-Hungarian Land Forces 1848-1918

== Literature ==
- Johann C. Allmayer-Beck, Erich Lessing: The K.u.k. Armee. 1848-1918. Verlag Bertelsmann, Munich, 1974, ISBN 3-570-07287-8.
- The k.u.k. Heer im Jahre 1895 Schriften of the Heeresgeschichtlichen Museums in Wien - Leopold Stocker Verlag, Graz, 1997
- k.u.k. Kriegsministerium „Dislokation and Einteilung of the k.u.k Heeres, der k.u.k. Kriegsmarine, der k.k. Landwehr and der k.u. Landwehr“ in: Seidels kleines Armeeschema - Herausg.: Seidel & Sohn Vienna, 1914
