= Imperial–royal =

Title of institutions of the Austrian Empire

The adjective kaiserlich-königlich (usually abbreviated to k. k.), German for imperial–royal, was applied to the authorities and state institutions of the Austrian Empire until the Austro-Hungarian Compromise of 1867, which established the Austro-Hungarian Empire. Thereafter the abbreviation k. k. only applied to institutions of the so-called Cisleithania (i.e. those lands not part of the Lands of the Crown of Saint Stephen/Transleithania: Hungary and Croatia-Slavonia; Bosnia and Herzegovina, annexed in 1878 from the Ottoman Empire, was a condominium of Cis- and Transleithania). Common institutions of both halves of the empire were described from 1867 to 1918 as kaiserlich und königlich/k. u. k. ("imperial and royal"). Contrary to the regulations, the Common Army continued to use the abbreviation k. k. to describe itself until 1889.

Today, the abbreviation k. k. is often loosely replaced by k. u. k. ("k and k"), but the two terms are historically and legally distinct. The prefix k. u. k. (kaiserlich und königlich) only properly referred to the authorities and institutions of both halves of the empire. The first k. (kaiserlich = "imperial") referred to the Emperor of Austria. In k. k., the second k. (königlich = "royal", literally "kingly") referred, from 1867, to the King of Bohemia (the Kingdom of Bohemia/Lands of the Bohemian Crown were part of Cisleithania). In k. u. k., the second k. (königlich) referred to the King of Hungary. Both the titles King of Bohemia and King of Hungary were borne by the Emperor.

The abbreviation h. k. k., which was frequently used in connection with the central ministries, meant "high" imperial–royal (hohes kaiserlich-königliches), e.g. in h. k. k. Ministerium für Kultus und Unterricht, h. k. k. Statthalterei für Tirol und Vorarlberg, h. k. k. Ministerium für Handel und Volkswirthschaft, etc.

== Terms used in other languages of the monarchy ==
German	Slovak	Czech	Hungarian	Polish	Italian	Slovenian	Ukrainian
k. k. – kaiserlich-königlich	c.k. – cisársko-kráľovský	c.k. – císařsko-královský	cs. kir. – császári-királyi	C. K. – cesarsko-królewski	I.R. – Imperiale Regio	c. k. – cesarsko-kraljevi	ц. к. – цісарсько-королівський

== See also ==
- Croatian–Hungarian Settlement
- King-Emperor – Sovereign title
