= Kriegsschule (Austria) =

Coordinates: 48°12′02″N 16°21′48″E

The k.u.k. War College, also k.u.k. Staff College (Ge: k.u.k. Kriegsschule) was the highest military facility to educate, instruct, train, and develop general staff officers of the Austrian Empire and later the Austro-Hungarian Empire.

It was located in Vienna, and active from 1852 to 1918.

Established in 1852, the k.u.k. War College was an outgrowth of the previous centers of Austrian military scholarship: the Kriegsarchiv and the Österreichische militärische Zeitschrift (Austrian Military Journal). Having been earlier suggested by the likes of officers including Joseph Radetzky von Radetz, it was organized early in the reign of Emperor Franz Josef. Among its students and faculty were such influential members of the Austro-Hungarian military as Count Franz Conrad von Hötzendorf, who attended the school and later taught tactics there from 1888 to 1892.
