= Friedrich von Beck-Rzikowsky =

Austrian general (1830–1920)

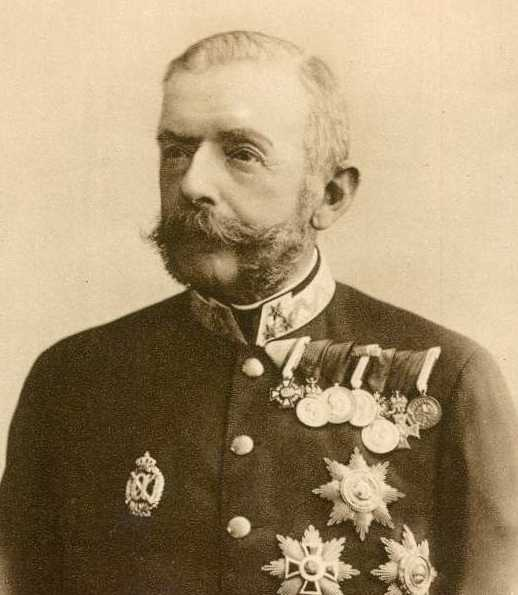
- Beck c. 1890
- Born: Friedrich Beck; March 21, 1830; Freiburg im Breisgau, Grand Duchy of Baden
- Died: February 9, 1920 (aged 89); Vienna, Austria
- Military career
- Allegiance: Austrian Empire (1846–1867); Austria-Hungary (1867–1918); Republic of Austria (1918–1920)
- Branch: Imperial Austrian Army (1846–1867); Imperial and Royal Army (1867–1907)
- Service years: 1846–1907
- Rank: Generaloberst (colonel general)
- Nickname: "The Vice Emperor"
- Known for: Chief of the general staff, Imperial and Royal Army (1881–1906)
- Conflicts: Hungarian Revolution of 1848; First Italian War of Independence; Brescia; Second Italian War of Independence; Battle of Magenta; Austro-Prussian War; Battle of Königgrätz (Sadowa)

Chief of the Military Chancery of His Imperial and Royal Apostolic Majesty
- In office 11 July 1867 – 30 June 1881
- Monarch: Franz Joseph I
- Preceded by: Office established
- Succeeded by: Leonidas von Popp

Friedrich Graf von Beck-Rzikowsky (21 March 1830 – 9 February 1920), sometimes Friedrich Beck, was an Austrian Generaloberst and Chief of the general staff of the Imperial and Royal Army of Austria-Hungary from 1881 to 1906.

== Biography ==
=== Early life ===
He was born Friedrich Beck at Freiburg im Breisgau in the Grand Duchy of Baden on 21 March 1830, the son of the military doctor Bernhard Oktav von Beck and his wife Anna Maria Rzikowsky von Dobrzicz.

=== Military career ===
Beck entered the Imperial Austrian Army in the service of the Austrian Empire in 1846 and served as a Leutnant (second lieutenant) and then as an Oberleutnant (first lieutenant) in the infantry, the pioneers, and then the quartermaster general's staff. In 1848 he took part in fighting in the Hungarian Revolution and in 1849 in the storming of Brescia during the First Italian War of Independence. during the Autumn Crisis of 1850, he was stationed in Bohemia during an Austrian mobilization to confront the Kingdom of Prussia over Prussia's proposed creation of the Erfurt Union, resulting in Prussia backing down and the reestablishment of the German Confederation. During the early 1850s, he was stationed in the Vienna garrison.

Beck was among the first students admitted to the Kriegsschule, the Austrian staff college, from which he graduated near the top of his class in 1854, and that year he received a promotion to Hauptmann (captain) and an appointment to the general staff. He then served on occupation duty in Moldavia and Wallachia. In 1857 he took part in a cartographic and geographic expedition in southern Hungary.

Beck distinguished himself as chief of staff of General Sigmund Freiherr von Reischach's division in Italy in 1859 during the Second Italian War of Independence. Finding that the Reischach Division had no maps of Piedmont, where the division fought forces of the Kingdom of Sardinia, he searched for maps in bookshops and stationery stores. Because of a breakdown in communications, the division was late to arrive on the scene of the Battle of Magenta, and he was seriously wounded, shot in the knee, while urging the division's troops forward on 4 June 1859. He was taken by train to Vienna to recover from his wound and missed the rest of the war, much to his dismay. However, in 1861 was both elevated to the Austrian knighthood as a Knight of the Order of the Iron Crown, Third Class, with war decoration for bravery in the face of the enemy and was promoted to major.

In 1862 Beck became adjutant to Baron Heinrich von Heß. In 1863 he became personal aide-de-camp to Emperor of Austria Franz Josef I. He held this position until 1881, winning the emperor's confidence and exercising the greatest influence on all military questions.

Beck was promoted to Oberstleutnant (lieutenant colonel) in 1865. During the Austro-Prussian War in 1866 he acted as the emperor's confidential agent at the headquarters of Feldzeugmeister Ludwig von Benedek both before and after the Battle of Königgrätz, and his advice was of great importance, though it was not always followed. In carrying out special missions for the emperor in the theater of war, he became known in wilder circles in the Austrian military.

The Austro-Hungarian Compromise of 1867 transformed the Austrian Empire into Austria-Hungary, and that year Beck was promoted to Oberst and became head of the military chancellery. In 1874, he also became a privy councilor and the emperor's adjutant general. He simultaneously held the posts of personal aide-de-camp, chancellery head, and adjutant general until 1881.

In 1878 Beck was promoted to Feldmarschalleutnant (lieutenant field marshal) and dispatched on a secret mission to represent the emperor at the headquarters of the commander-in-chief of the Austro-Hungarian troops operating in Bosnia. He then was made a baron.

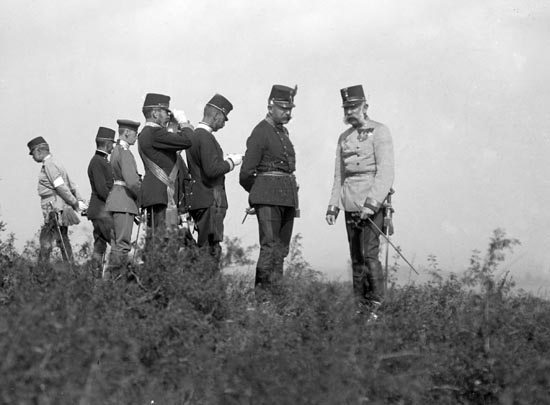
Beck (second from right) with Emperor Franz Josef I (right) in 1897.

In 1881 Beck became chief of the general staff of the Imperial and Royal Army of Austria-Hungary, a position he held for 25 years and in which, as a confidant of the Emperor, he exercised great influence. He sought to mediate the many internal conflicts within the Austro-Hungarian Army. Calm and cautious, he took a middle position on military issues between progressive-liberal modernizers and the reactionary camp centered around Archduke Albrecht. Under his leadership, the General Staff became the actual supreme command of the armed forces, whose subordination to the Reich War Ministry became almost nominal. He gained a reputation for clear judgment and practical common sense that enabled him to see and judge men and things from a purely objective standpoint. Not only was his advice listened to in military affairs, but he frequently exercised great influence on important political and personal questions, gaining a great reputation throughout the monarchy as one of its most influential men, so much so that he sometimes was referred to informally as the "vice emperor."

In 1882, Beck received the honorary title of Inhaber (proprietor) of the 47th Infantry Regiment. He was appointed to the House of Lords of the Imperial Council in 1885, and in that year he initiated the creation of a general map of Central Europe, which was later produced at a scale of 1:200,000. He also initiated the introduction of photogrammetry as a recording method for topographic maps. In 1888 he was promoted to Kaiserlicher und königlicher Feldmarschall (Hungarian: Császári és királyi tábornagy, English: "imperial and royal field marshal"), and in 1893 he became a knight of the Order of the Black Eagle, an order of chivalry of the Kingdom of Prussia. During the Hungarian Crisis of 1905, Beck developed Fall U ("Case U"), a plan to suppress a possible uprising in the Kingdom of Hungary by force.

In 1906, at the insistence of the heir to the throne, Archduke Franz Ferdinand, Emperor Franz Josef I reluctantly replaced the 76-year-old Beck as chief of the general staff with Feldmarschallleutnant (Lieutenant Field Marshal) Franz Conrad von Hötzendorf. In recognition of his many years of service, Beck was elevated to the rank of count and subsequently appointed captain of the Arcièren-Leibgarde (Lifeguard of Halberdiers). He retired in 1907 at the age of 77.

=== Later life ===
In 1913, Beck received imperial approval to be unite his name with that of the family name of his wife, Baroness Rzikowsky von Dobrschitz, whose male line had died out. Thereafter he was known as Friedrich von Beck-Rzikowsky.

In retirement, Beck-Rzikowsky was promoted to the newly created rank of Generaloberst (colonel general) in 1916. He died in Vienna, Austria, on 9 February 1920.

=== Personal life ===
On 5 October 1905, Beck married Baroness Bianca Sylvia von Lazarini (1882–1949), Baroness Rzikowsky von Dobrschitz, the daughter of Baron Oskar Hippolyt von Lazarini and the noblewoman Helene von Rotarest. The couple's eldest daughter, Alice (born 1906), married Alfred Schwinner, the legation secretary of the Austrian embassy in Vienna, in September 1929.

== Orders and decorations ==
- Austria:
  - Knight of the Iron Crown
    - 3rd Class with War Decoration, 1859;
    - 1st Class, 1878
  - Imperial Order of Leopold
    - Knight, 1868;
    - Grand Cross, 1885
  - Golden Jubilee Court Medal
  - Jubilee Court Cross
  - Grand Cross of the Royal Hungarian Order of Saint Stephen, 1896
  - Military Merit Cross, 3rd Class with War Decoration and in Diamonds
- (Tuscany) Tuscan Grand Ducal Family:
  - Commander of the Order of Saint Joseph
  - Grand Cross of the Military Merit Order
- Baden:
  - Knight of the Zähringer Lion, 1st Class with Oak Leaves, 1852
  - Knight of the House Order of Fidelity, 1900
  - Grand Cross of the Military Karl-Friedrich Merit Order, 1906
- Bavaria:
  - Grand Cross of the Military Merit Order
- Belgium:
  - Grand Cordon of the Order of Leopold (military)
- Bulgaria:
  - Grand Cross of Saint Alexander
- France:
  - Grand Officer of the Legion of Honour
- Greece:
  - Grand Cross of the Redeemer
- Grand Duchy of Hesse:
  - Grand Cross of the Ludwig Order
  - Grand Cross of the Merit Order of Philip the Magnanimous
- Italy:
  - Grand Cross of Saints Maurice and Lazarus
  - Grand Cross of the Crown of Italy
- Japan:
  - Grand Cordon of the Rising Sun
- Montenegro:
  - Grand Cross of the Order of Prince Danilo I
- Ottoman Empire:
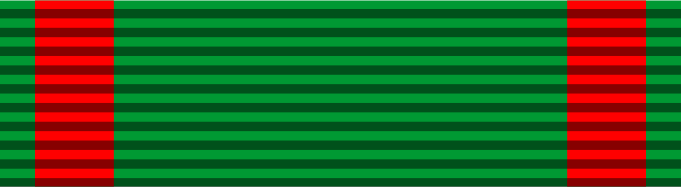
  - Order of Osmanieh, 1st Class in Diamonds
  - Order of the Medjidie, 2nd Class
- Persia:
  - Order of the Lion and the Sun, 1st Class in Diamonds
- Prussia:
  - Knight of the Red Eagle, 1st Class, 1888; in Diamonds, 6 September 1891
  - Knight of the Black Eagle, 19 September 1893
- Romania:
  - Grand Cross of the Star of Romania
- Russia:
  - Knight of Saint Alexander Nevsky, in Diamonds
  - Knight of Saint Anna, 1st Class
  - Knight of Saint Stanislaus, 1st Class
- Saxony:'
  - Grand Cross of the Albert Order, with Golden Star, 1891; with Silver Crown
- Siam:
  - Grand Cross of the White Elephant
- Spain:
  - Commander of the Order of Charles III, with Star
- Württemberg:
  - Commander of the Friedrich Order, 1st Class
