= Österreichisches Biographisches Lexikon 1815–1950 =

Austrian dictionary

The Österreichisches Biographisches Lexikon 1815–1950 (ÖBL, Austrian Biographical Lexicon 1815–1950) is a dictionary of biographical entries for individuals who have contributed to the history of Austria, published by the Austrian Academy of Sciences. It consists of 16 volumes with more than 20,000 biographies. It follows the Biographisches Lexikon des Kaiserthums Oesterreich (BLKÖ, Biographical Lexicon of the Austrian Empire) which dealt with the period between 1750 and 1850 and which was published from 1856 to 1891 in 60 volumes, containing 24,254 critical biographies.

== Published volumes ==
- Volume 1: Aarau Friedrich – Gläser Franz, 1957 (reprinted without changes 1993). ISBN 3-7001-1327-7
- Volume 2: Glaessner Arthur – Hübl Harald H., 1959 (reprinted without changes 1993). ISBN 3-7001-1328-5
- Volume 3: Hübl Heinrich – Knoller Richard, 1965 (reprinted without changes 1993). ISBN 3-7001-1329-3
- Volume 4: Knolz Joseph J. – Lange Wilhelm, 1969 (reprinted without changes 1993). ISBN 3-7001-2145-8
- Volume 5: Lange v. Burgenkron Emil – [Maier] Simon Martin, 1972 (reprinted without changes 1993). ISBN 3-7001-2146-6
- Volume 6: [Maier] Stefan – Musger August, 1975 ISBN 3-7001-1332-3
- Volume 7: Musić August – Petra-Petrescu Nicolae, 1978. ISBN 3-7001-2142-3
- Volume 8: Petračić Franjo – Ražun Matej, 1983 ISBN 3-7001-0615-7
- Volume 9: Rázus Martin – Savić Šarko, 1988 ISBN 3-7001-1483-4
- Volume 10: Saviňek Slavko – Schobert Ernst, 1994 (reprinted without changes 1999). ISBN 3-7001-2186-5
- Volume 11: Schoblik Friedrich – [Schwarz] Ludwig Franz, 1999 ISBN 3-7001-2803-7
- Volume 12: [Schwarz] Marie – Spannagel Rudolf, 2005 ISBN 3-7001-3580-7
- Volume 13: Spanner Anton Carl – Stulli Gioachino, 2010 ISBN 978-3-7001-6963-5
- Volume 14: Stulli Luca – Tůma Karel, 2015 ISBN 978-3-7001-7794-4
- Volume 15: Tumlirz Karl – Warchalowski, August 2018 ISBN 978-3-7001-8383-9
- Volume 16: Warchalowski Jakob – Zycha Marianne Emilie, 2022 ISBN 978-3-7001-9334-0
