= Imperial and Royal =

Title of institutions in Austria-Hungary

The medium Imperial and Royal coat of arms of Austria-Hungary (as of 1915)

Map of imperial Austria (Cisleithania, in pink) and royal Hungary (Transleithania, in green), with Bosnia as a common condominium

The phrase Imperial and Royal (German: kaiserlich und königlich, pronounced [ˈkaɪzɐlɪç ʔʊnt ˈkøːnɪklɪç]) (Note: Typically abbreviated as k. u. k., k. und k., k. & k. in German (the und is always spoken unabbreviated), cs. és k. (császári és királyi) in Hungarian, c. a k. (císařský a královský) in Czech, C. i K. (Cesarski i Królewski) in Polish, c. in k. (cesarski in kraljevski) in Slovenian, c. i kr. (carski i kraljevski) in Croatian, ц. и кр. (царски и краљевски) in Serbian, and I.R. (Imperiale Regio) in Italian) refers to the court/government of the Habsburg Dual Monarchy of Austria-Hungary from 1867 to 1918.

During that period, the Habsburg monarch reigned simultaneously as the Kaiser (Emperor of Austria) and as the König (King of Hungary), while the two territories were joined in a real union (akin to a two-state federation). The acts of the common government, which was responsible only for the Imperial & Royal ("I&R") Ministry of Foreign Affairs, the I&R Ministry of War and the I&R Ministry of Finance (financing only the two other ministries), were carried out in the name of "His Imperial and Royal Majesty", and the central governmental bodies had their names prefixed with k. u. k.

== Symbolic employment of und or u. ==
Before 1867, the territories under the control of the Habsburg monarch in Vienna used kaiserlich und königlich or the hyphenated kaiserlich-königlich interchangeably. Neither of the spellings defined a hierarchy among the Habsburg dynastic kingdoms, principalities, duchies, and other bodies politic. The Habsburg monarchs ruled the kingdoms of Hungary, Croatia and Bohemia as their kings. The title Emperor (German: Kaiser) applied to their role as heads of the conglomerate of the mostly German states called the Holy Roman Empire until 1806. The same title, Emperor, came to identify their role as rulers of the newly named Austrian Empire that the Habsburgs declared from 11 August 1804.

The name "Imperial-Royal Army" was used from 1745, as "Royal" referred to the Apostolic Kingdom of Hungary, which was not part of the Holy Roman Empire, but under Habsburg rule.

After the Austro-Hungarian Compromise of 1867, the Hungarians insisted on the und ('and'), not the hyphen, in all usage in line with the new autonomous status of the kingdom within the Habsburg lands. Use of the phrase Kaiserlich und königlich was decreed in a letter written by the Emperor on October 17, 1889, for the military, the navy and the institutions shared by both parts of the empire. Subsequently, the abbreviation k.k. only referred to the institutions of the "Austrian" part of Austria-Hungary (Cisleithania). The abbreviation m.k. (Hungarian: magyar királyi), or kgl. ung. (German: königlich ungarisch), both meaning 'Royal Hungarian', was applied in reference to the governmental bodies of the Kingdom of Hungary (Transleithania).

In official documents, the abbreviation used provides information on the lands targeted:

- k.k. or k.-k., meaning "imperial (Austria) – royal (Bohemia)", pertains to the Austrian Empire before 1867 and to the Austrian part of the Austro-Hungarian Empire 1867–1918
- k.u.k., meaning "imperial (Austria) and royal (Hungary)", pertains to the Austro-Hungarian Empire 1867–1918

== Other uses ==
The ubiquity of this phrase in all administrative matters made it a synonym for the Habsburg administration, sometimes referred to as the "k. u. k. monarchy" in Central European publications through the present. Other languages of the Habsburg Monarchy retained the German abbreviation or used it interchangeably with their own − c. i kr. in Croatian, c. a k. or c.-k. in Czech, cs. és kir. in Hungarian, I.R. in Italian, c. i k. or C.K. in Polish, often hyphenated (cezaro-crăiesc) in Romanian, c. a k. in Slovak, c. kr. in Slovenian.

The abbreviation k.k. gave rise to the noun Kakania (spelling out the letter K [kah] twice as well as reminiscent of caca in the Central European languages). It was intended to describe the Habsburg Monarchy as a state of mind, bureaucratic and with a highly stratified formal society. A discussion of Kakania became a highlight of the first volume of Robert Musil's novel The Man Without Qualities (1930).

== See also ==
- Purveyors to the Imperial and Royal Court of Austria-Hungary; The term was also applied to companies supplying the Royal Austrian court.
- Imperial–royal (kaiserlich-königlich)
- kaiserlich
- Hackle
- King-Emperor
