= Imperial and Royal Uhlans =

Cavalry of Austro-Hungarian army (1867 - 1918)

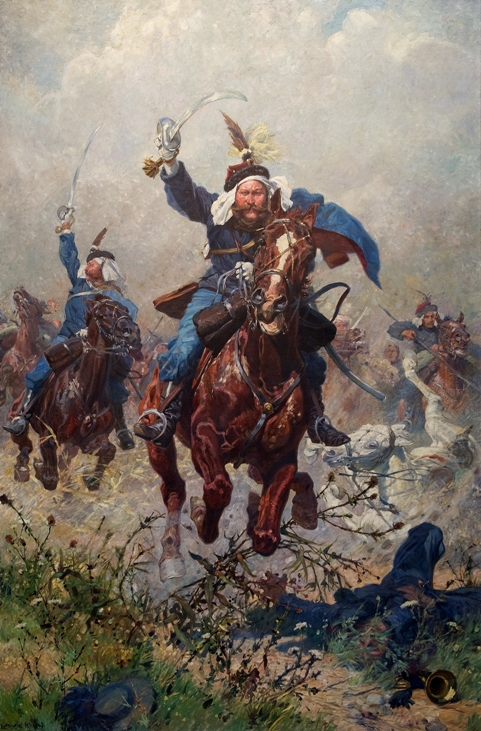
Colonel Maximilian Ritter von Rodakowski and the 13th Uhlans in the Battle of Custoza. (1908 painting by Ludwig Koch. Oil on linen, Army History Museum, Vienna)

Together with the Dragoons and Hussars, the Imperial and Royal Uhlans (German: k.u.k. Ulanen), made up the cavalry of the Austro-Hungarian Army from 1867 to 1918, both in the Common Army and in the Austrian Landwehr, where they were known as the Imperial-Royal Landwehr Uhlans (k.k. Landwehr-Ulanen).

The Austrian monarchy, weakened by losing the war against Prussia in 1866, effectively had to guarantee the autonomy of the Kingdom of Hungary in the so-called Compromise of 15 March 1867. As a result, the Hungarian half of the Empire immediately began to establish its own army, the Royal Hungarian Landwehr (Hungarian: Magyar Királyi Honvédség).

Following the signing of the Compromise, the Austrian half of the Empire also started to build an army, the Imperial-Royal Landwehr (German: k.k. Landwehr). The two new Landwehr forces thus existed alongside the Common Army (Gemeinsame Armee), the imperial army of the whole Empire. In effect this meant that Austria-Hungary had three separate armies at the same time.

== Organisation ==
The Common Army has 11 Uhlan regiments and the Austria Landwehr 6 regiments. By tradition the majority of Uhlans were recruited from the Kingdom of Galicia and Lodomeria. The regiments were also stationed there, with few exceptions.

- In 1914, the Imperial and Royal Cavalry regiments each consisted of 2 divisions (battalions) each of 3 squadrons (Eskadronen).

== The Imperial and Royal Uhlans (11 regiments) ==
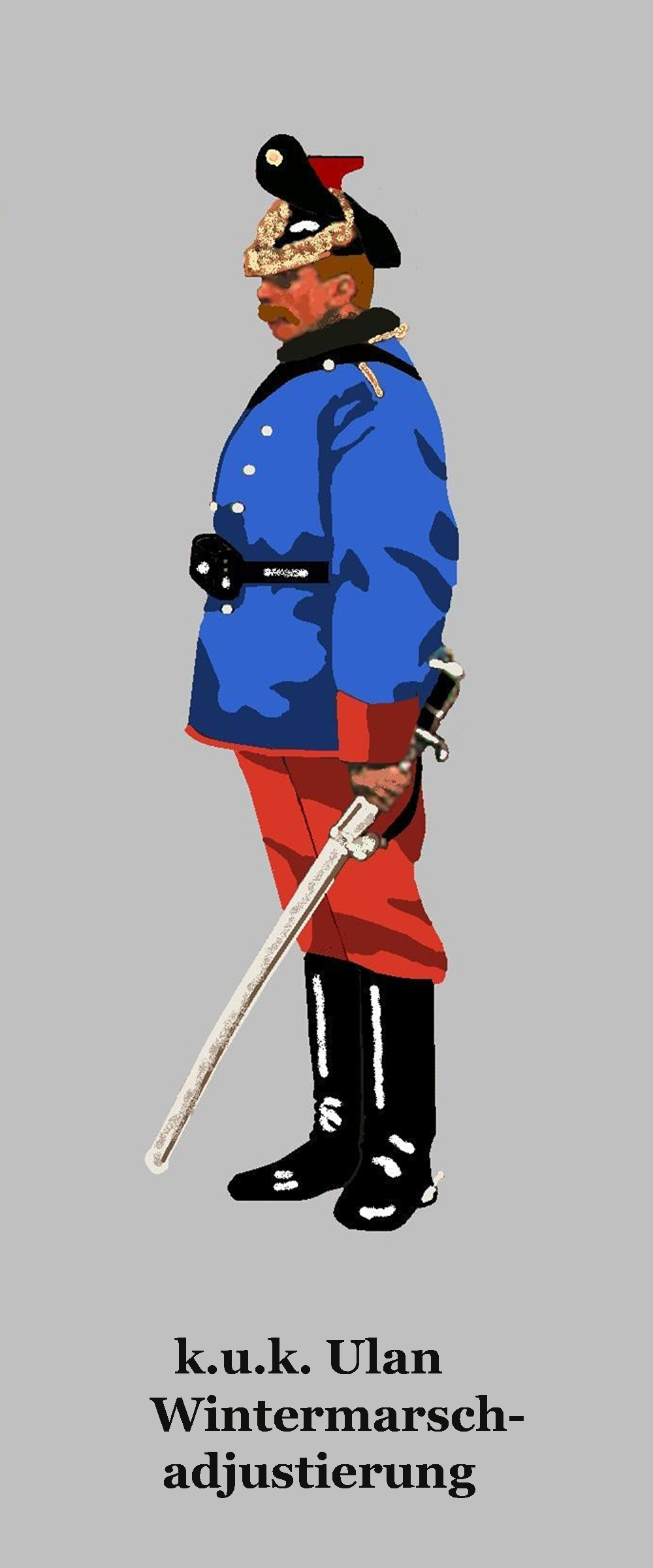
Uhlan in winter marching order

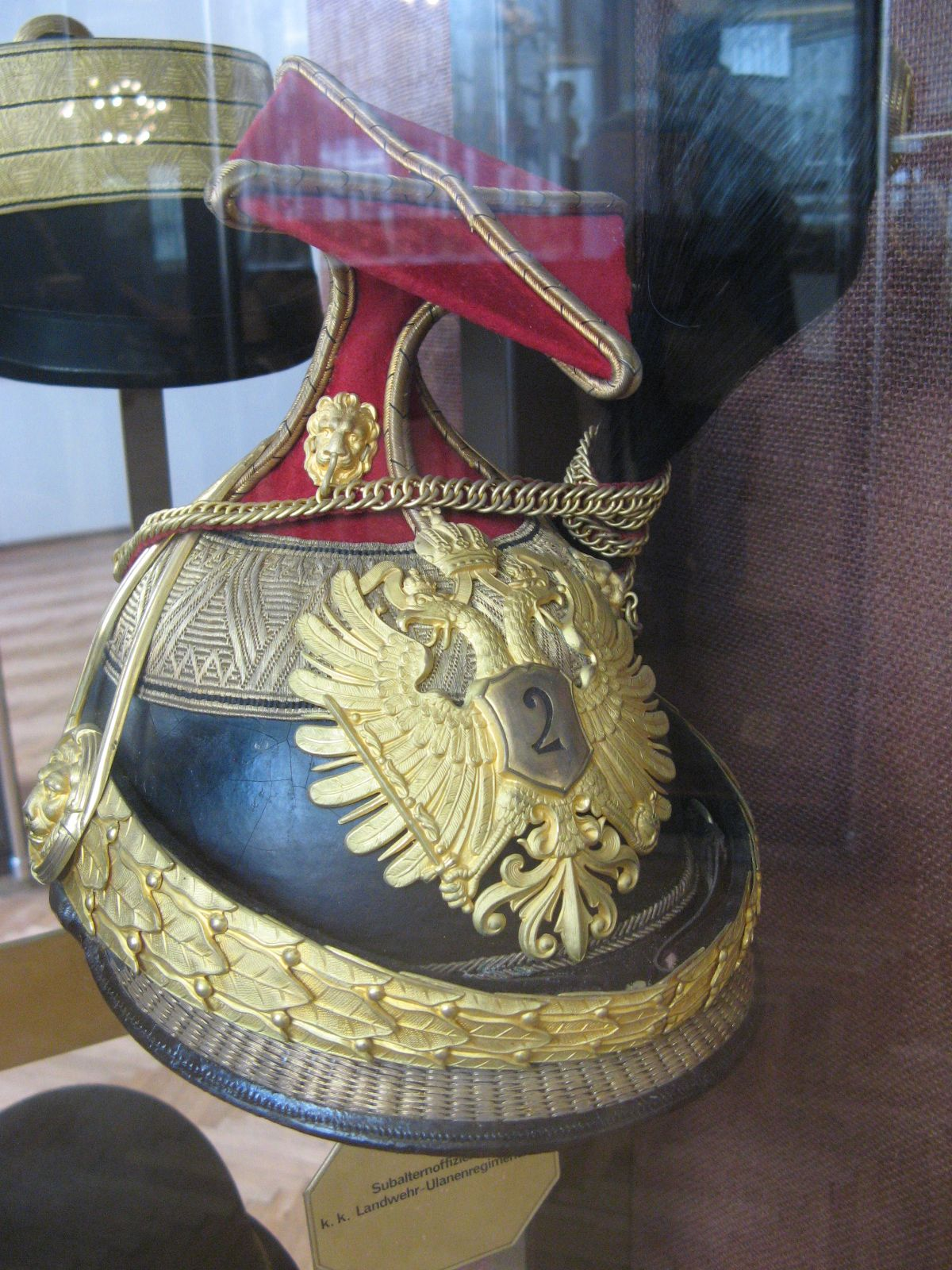
Czapka of a subaltern of the 2nd Uhlans

- 1st Galician Uhlans (Ritter von Brudermann's) (Galizisches Ulanen-Regiment „Ritter von Brudermann“ Nr. 1)
- 2nd Galician Uhlans (Prince of Schwarzenberg's) (Galizisches Ulanen-Regiment „Fürst zu Schwarzenberg“ Nr. 2)
- 3rd Galician Uhlans (Archduke Carl's) (Galizisches Ulanen-Regiment „Erzherzog Carl“ Nr. 3)
- 4th Galician Uhlans (Emperor's) (Galizisches Ulanen-Regiment „Kaiser“ Nr. 4)
- 5th Ukrainian-Croatian Uhlans (Emperor Nicholas II of Russia's) (Ukrainisch-Croatisches Ulanen-Regiment „Nikolaus II. Kaiser von Rußland“ Nr. 5)
- 6th Galician Uhlans (Emperor Joseph II's) (Galizisches Ulanen-Regiment „Kaiser Joseph II.“ Nr. 6)
- 7th Galician Uhlans (Archduke Franz Ferdinand's) (Galizisches Ulanen-Regiment „Erzherzog Franz Ferdinand“ Nr. 7)
- 8th Galician Uhlans (Count Auersperg's) (Galizisches Ulanen-Regiment „Graf Auersperg“ Nr. 8)
- 11th Bohemian Uhlans (Emperor Alexander II of Russia's) (Böhmisches Ulanen-Regiment „Alexander II. Kaiser von Rußland“ Nr. 11)
- 12th Hungarian (Croatian-Slavonian) Uhlans (Count Huyn's) (Ungarisches (croatisch-slavonisches) Ulanen-Regiment „Graf Huyn“ Nr. 12)
- 13th Galician Uhlans (von Böhm-Ermolli's) (Galizisches Ulanen-Regiment „von Böhm-Ermolli“ Nr. 13)

== Imperial-Royal Landwehr Uhlans ==
- 1st Landwehr Uhlans (Landwehr Ulanen Regiment Nr. 1)

Assigned as divisional cavalry:
1 and 2 Sqns: 11th Infantry Division
3 and 4 Sqns: 30th Infantry Division
5 and 6 Sqns: 43rd Landwehr Infantry Division
Nationalities: 65 % Ruthenians - 30 % Polish - 5 % various
Recruiting district: Lemberg
Garrison: Lemberg

- 2nd Landwehr Uhlans (Landwehr Ulanen Regiment Nr. 2)

Assigned as divisional cavalry:
1+2 Sqns: 26th Landwehr Infantry Division
3+4 Sqns: 29th Infantry Division
5+6. Sqns: 10th Infantry Division
Nationalities: 58 % Czechs - 42 % various
Recruiting district: Leitmeritz
Garrison: Hohenmauth

- 3rd Landwehr Uhlans (Landwehr Ulanen Regiment Nr. 3)

Assigned as divisional cavalry:
1+2 Sqns: 45th Landwehr Infantry Division
3+4 Sqns: 24th Infantry Division
5+6. Sqns: 2nd Infantry Division
Nationalities: 69 % Poles - 26 % Ruthenians - 5 % various
Recruiting district: Przemysl
Garrison: Rzeszów

- 4th Landwehr Uhlans (Landwehr Ulanen Regiment Nr. 4)

Assigned as divisional cavalry:
1+2 Sqns: 5th Infantry Division
3+4 Sqns: 12th Infantry Division
5+6. Sqns: 46th Landwehr Infantry Division
Nationalities: 85 % Poles - 15 % various
Recruiting district: Krakau
Garrison: Olmütz

- 5th Landwehr Uhlans (Landwehr Ulanen Regiment Nr. 5)

Assigned as divisional cavalry:
1+2 Sqns: 4th Infantry Division
3+4 Sqns: 25th Infantry Division
5+6. Sqns: 13th Landwehr Infantry Division
Nationalities: 97 % Germans - 3 % various
Recruiting district: Vienna
Garrison: Stockerau

- 6th Landwehr Uhlans (Landwehr Ulanen Regiment Nr. 6)

Assigned as divisional cavalry:
1+2 Sqns: 3rd Infantry Division
3+4 Sqns: 8th Infantry Division
5+6. Sqns: 44th Landwehr Infantry Division
Nationalities: 60 % Germans - 39 % Czechs - 1 % various
Recruiting district: Prague
Garrison: Wels

== Sources ==
- Austrian State Archives/War Archives in Vienna
- Glenn Jewison, Jörg C. Steiner: The Austro-Hungarian Land Forces 1848-1918

== Literature ==
- Johann C. Allmayer-Beck, Erich Lessing: Die K.u.k. Armee. 1848-1918. Verlag Bertelsmann, München 1974, ISBN 3-570-07287-8.
- Das k.u.k. Heer im Jahre 1895 Schriften des Heeresgeschichtlichen Museums in Wien - Stocker Verlag, Graz 1997
- k.u.k. Kriegsministerium „Dislokation und Einteilung des k.u.k Heeres, der k.u.k. Kriegsmarine, der k.k. Landwehr und der k.u. Landwehr“ in: Seidels kleines Armeeschema - Herausg.: Seidel & Sohn Wien 1914
- „Adjustierungsvorschrift für das k.u.k. Heer, die k.k. Landwehr, die k.u. Landwehr, die verbundenen Einrichtungen und das Korps der Militärbeamten“ von 1867 Herausgegeben durch das k.u.k. Kriegsministerium Wien. Fassung von 1911/1912
