= 4th Galician Uhlans (Emperor's) =

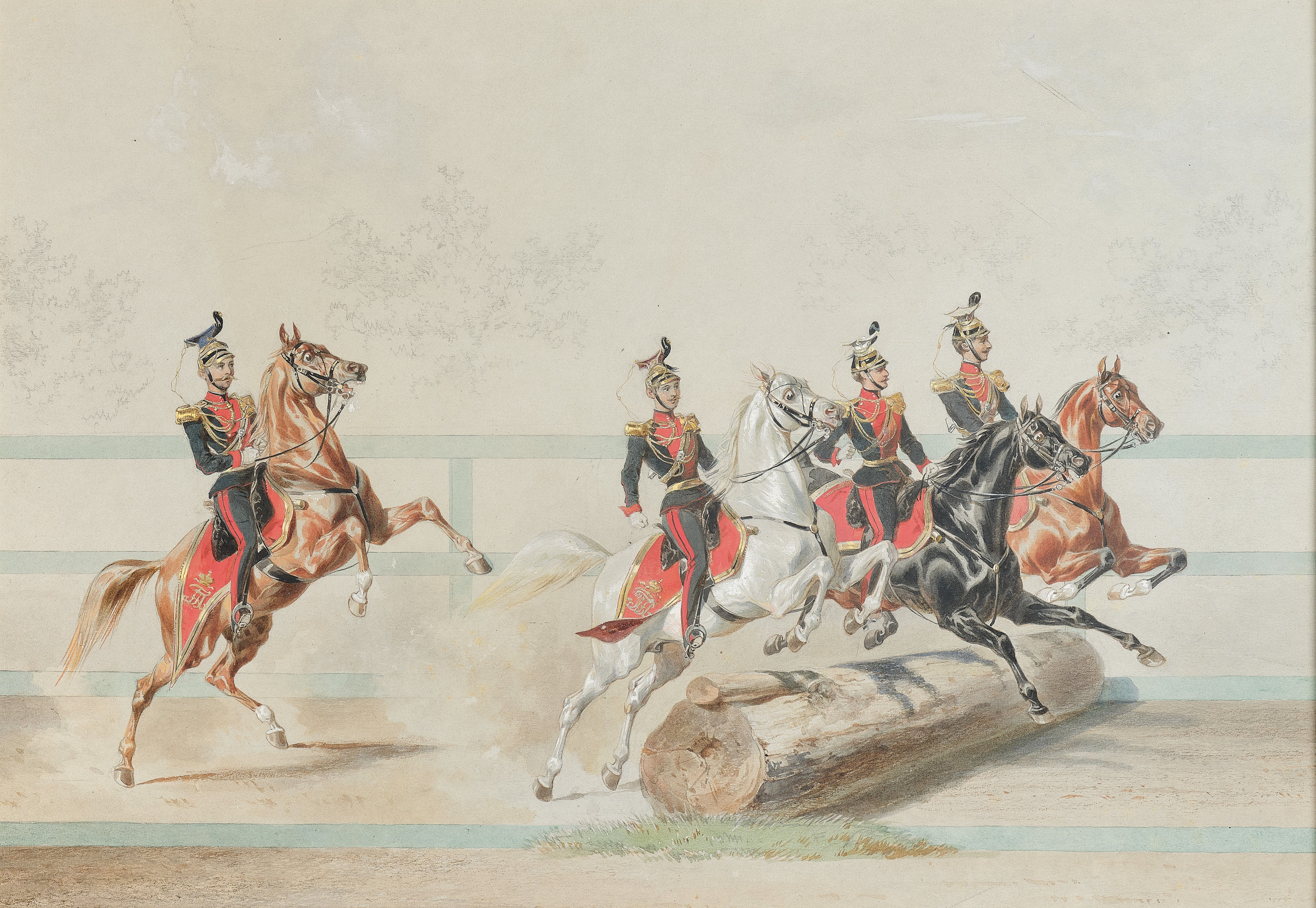
Two Uhlans of the 4th regiment (right) partaking in exercises at the Equitationsinstitut in Vienna with Uhlans from the 2nd (centre) and 5th (left) regiments.

The Austro-Hungarian Uhlan Regiment "Kaiser" No. 4 was a cavalry unit in the Joint Army within the Austro-Hungarian Land Forces from 1813 to 1918, affiliated with the Austrian Landwehr. It participated in the Revolutions of 1848, Risorgimento, Austro-Prussian War, and World War I. The majority of its recruits were Ruthenian and Polish.

== Formation history ==
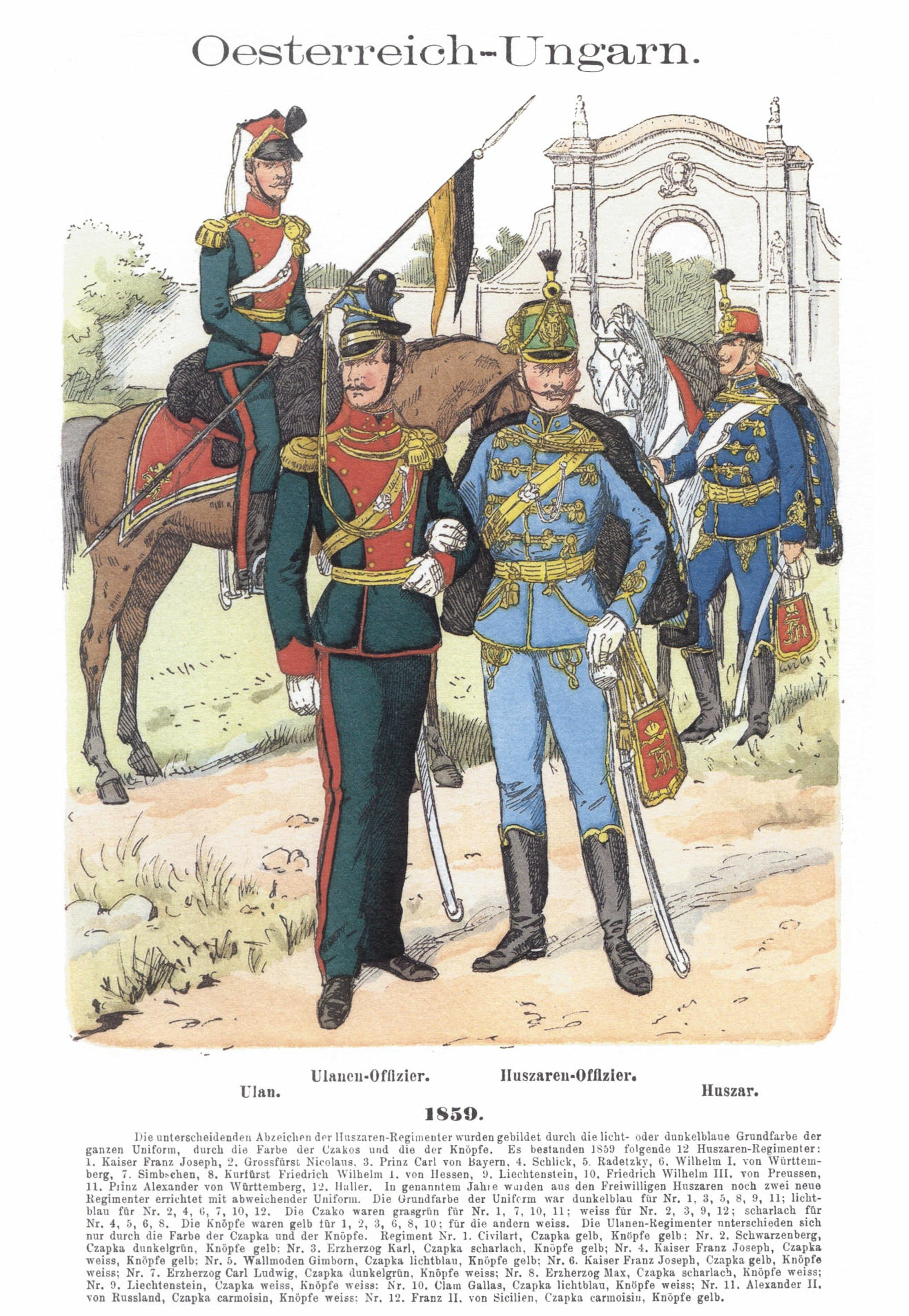
Austro-Hungarian uhlans and hussars, mid to late 19th century

In 1813/1814, the Galician Estates set up an Uhlan regiment at the Gródek assembly point in eastern Galicia. The tribe consisted of batches and men from the other three Uhlan regiments. (Some officers also came from the Chevauxlegers Regiment O'Reilly and the Hussar Regiment Kienmayer)

The regiment was initially named after Emperor Franz. It was renamed in 1835 and 1848 in honour of his successors Ferdinand and Franz Joseph.

In 1860, the 4th Division had to be relinquished to supplement the Lombard Uhlan Regiment No. 11.

In 1884 the young Archduke Ferdinand Karl of Austria was commissioned as a 2nd lieutenant in the 4th Ulan regiment.

== Additions ==
Since its formation, the regiment was recruited from Galicia, initially only from eastern Galicia.

1853 From the district of the Infantry Regiment No. 15 (Tarnopol)

1857 From the supplementary districts of the infantry regiments No. 30 and No. 15 (Lviv and Tarnopol)

1860 from the supplementary districts of the infantry regiments No. 30 and No. 55 (Lemberg and Brezezany)

1867 from supplementary districts of infantry regiments No. 30 and No. 80 (Lviv and Zloczów)

1875–80 From the district of the Infantry Regiment No. 80

1883–89 From the district of the Infantry Regiment No. 30.

After that, with the addition, it was assigned to the area of the XI Corps (Lviv Military Territorial District).

In 1915, all honorary names were deleted without replacement. From then on, the association was only called "k.u.k. Uhlan Regiment No. 4" (However, this could not be enforced in common parlance, on the one hand because no one adhered to it, on the other hand the thrifty Austro-Hungarian military administration had decreed that all existing stamps and forms should first be used up).

== Peace garrisons ==
During the 19th century, it was Austrian government policy to quarter troops in provinces far from their homeland to prevent armed insurrections. In accordance with this, the Galician uhlan regiments were garrisoned in Italy until the 1840s. In the 1890s the five Galician Uhlan regiments were garrisoned in Lviv and Jaroslaw as the general staff correctly predicted that the region would be a likely frontline conflict zone with Russia.

1814 Gródek

1814–15 Pardubice

1815 Milan

1816 Sárospatak

1820 Vienna

1822 Alessandria

1823 Milan and Pavia

1830 Kecskemét

1832 Alt-Arad

1837 Oradea

1845 Gyöngyös

1847 Cremona

1849 Sáros-Patak

1850 Tövis

1851 Ujpćs, then Medias

1854 Radautz

1856 Oradea

1857–59 Gyöngyös

1855 Kronstadt

1859–66 Keszthely

1866 Alt-Arad

1872 Košice

1878 Nagy-Mihály

1882 Brzezany

1889 Stanislau

1891 Jaroslau

1892 Lviv

1894 Zolkiew

1912 Wiener Neustadt

== Emperors ==
1813 Emperor Franz

1835 Ferdinand I of Austria

1848 Emperor Franz Joseph

1916: Emperor Karl I of Austria

== Commanders ==
1813–41 General of the Cavalry Johann Graf Klebelsberg, Baron of Thumburg

1841–57 Field Marshal Lieutenant Felix Graf von Woyna

1857–85 Field Marshal Lieutenant Alfred Graf Paar

1914 General of the Cavalry Rudolf von Brudermann

== Regimental colonels ==
1813 Oberst Stanislaus von Poradowski

1815 Oberst Joseph von Devay

1820 Oberst Eugen Graf Wratislaw

1830 Oberst Leopold Graf Spannocchi

1835 Oberst Carl Freiherr Pergler von Perglas

1843 Oberst Carl von Grawert

1848 Oberst Carl Freiherr Zessner von Spitzenberg

1849 Oberst Joseph Graf Castelnau

1852 Oberst Leopold Graf Stürgkh

1853 Oberst Julius Graf Hoditz und Wolframitz

1856 Oberst Eugen Freiherr Piret de Bihain

1862 Oberst Leopold Fischer

1863 Oberst Johann Freiherr von Appel

1866 Oberst Otto Freiherr von Scholley

1871 Oberst Heinrich Graf Herberstein

1877 Oberst Heinrich von Nauendorf

1882 Oberst Peter Stoits

1886 Oberst Joseph Bergauer

1888 Oberst Adalbert Graf Gilitzstein

1894 Oberst Ernst von Poten

1899 Oberst Gottfried von Suchan

1905 Oberst Alfred Ambros Edler von Rechtenberg

1907 Oberst Edmund Ritter von Zaremba

1912 Oberst Severin Zietkiewicz

1913 Oberst Wilhelm Heyszl

1914 Oberstleutnant Ludwig Redlich

1917 Oberst Heinrich v. Hermann

== Campaigns ==
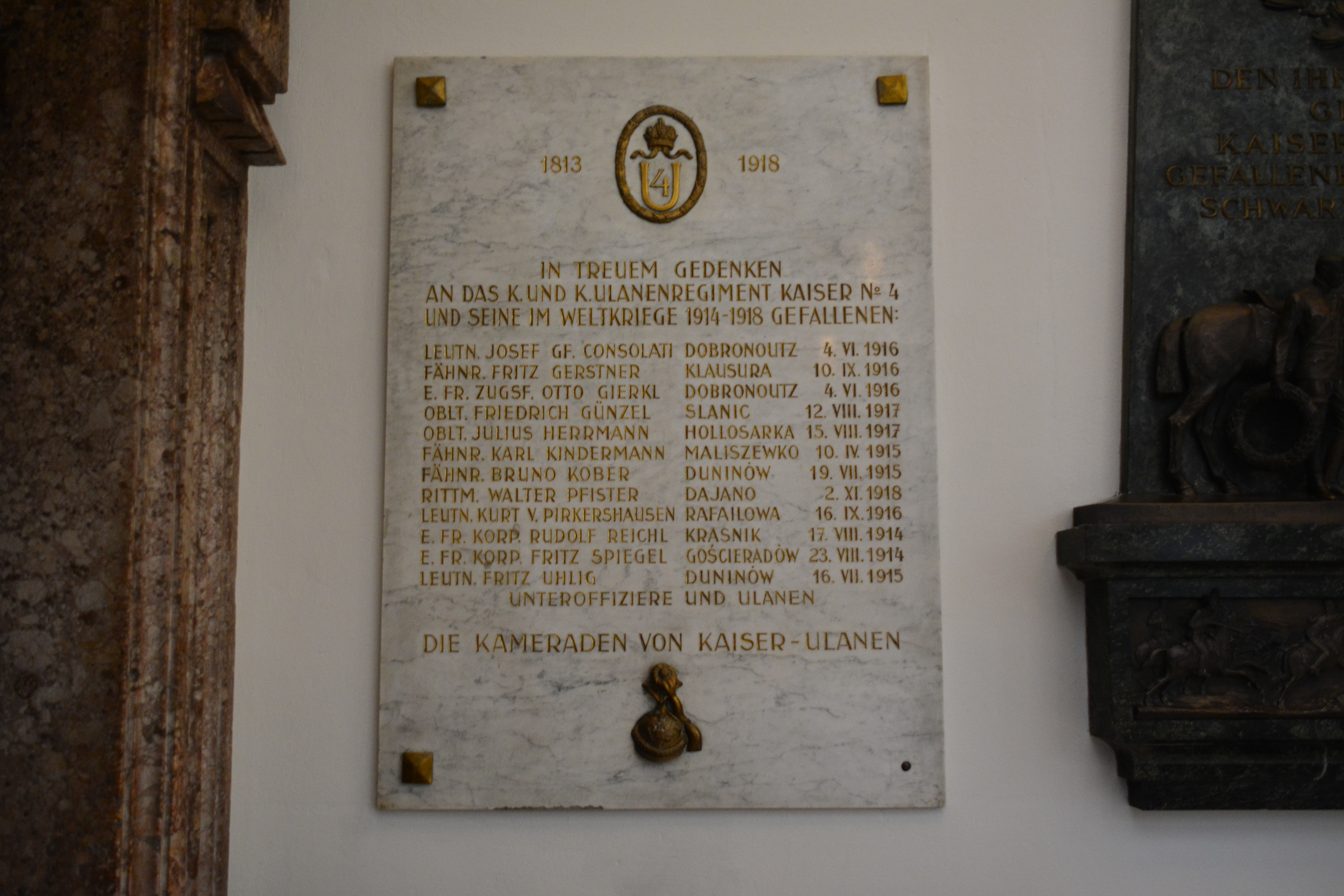
Memorial in Vienna for the uhlan officers who fell in World War I

=== Reign of the Hundred Days ===
1815: Detached to the army on the Upper Rhine. In the battle near Strasbourg in the reserve. No combat activity.

=== Risorgimento ===
1821: Took part in the campaign in Piedmont, but did not take part in combat.

=== Revolution of 1848/49 in the Austrian Empire ===
1848: In Lombardy. At the outbreak of the revolution, three squadrons under Colonel Grawert were only able to escape from the rebellious Cremona by force of arms. Later, five squadrons were detached to the I Corps of the Main Army, one squadron belonged to the Mantua garrison, and two squadrons were assigned to the reserve in the Nugent Corps. Parts of the former fought in the battles of Santa Lucia, Curtatone, Sommacampagna, the Battle of Custozza and the Gecht of Volta.

1849: In Italy without combat activity under the command of the architect and brigadier general George Heinrich Schonhals (1784–1862). Transfer of the regiment to Hungary. Battles of the two Majors divisions in the Battle of Csorna, the Lieutenant Colonel Division fought a battle at Pered (Tešedíkovo). The regiment was then assembled in the I Corps Schlick and fought at Raab, Ács (Hungary), Pusztaherkály, Szőreg, Csatád and Temesvár, and took part in the pursuit of the insurgents to the Transylvanian border.

=== Sardinian War ===
1859: Transferred to Italy in June, two divisions were stationed at the lower Po, the other two in the XI Corps. In the Battle of Solferino, only one 1/2 squadron was used as part of Wernhard's X Corps.

=== Austro-Prussian War ===
1866: Five squadrons were assigned to Eugen von Schindlocker's brigade of the 1st Reserve Cavalry Division of the Northern Army. The regiment fought at Wysokow, Skalitz and in the Battle of Königgrätz where they engaged Groeben's Prussian cuirassier brigade.

=== World War I ===
In the First World War, the Uhlans initially fought as cavalrymen (whether in a regimental unit or as a squadron, divided as a divisional cavalry is currently unknown), but also as infantry in all theaters of war in the east and southeast. During the mobilization of 1914 squadrons 1 and 2 were attached to the 5th Austrian Infantry division, squadrons 3 and 4 were attached to the 12th infantry division and squadrons 5 and 6 were attached to the 46th infantry division. However, the units of the 4th Cavalry Division remained mounted until the end.

The 4th Uhlans fought in the First Battle of Lemberg from August to September 1914. In December 1914 the commanders of the 4th Uhlan regiment reported desertions and the dissemination of pro-Russian propaganda among the enlisted Ruthenian personnel.

=== Disbandment ===
After the proclamation of Poland as an independent state in October 1918, the soldiers of Ruthenian and Polish origin were called upon by the interim government to cease hostilities and return home. As a rule, this request was followed. Most of the Ruthenian soldiers also returned to their homeland without waiting for the unit to be disbanded. Thus, the unit was withdrawn from its previous high command, the Austro-Hungarian War Ministry, and could not be demobilized by it and at best theoretically disbanded. Whether, when and where such a dissolution took place is currently unknown.

=== Status and association affiliation in 1914 ===
II Corps – 4th Cavalry Division – 18th Cavalry Brigade

Nationalities: 65% Ruthenians – 29% Poles – 6% Diverse

Regimental languages: Ukrainian and Polish

== Uniforms ==
1813: white czapka, dark green kurtka and trousers, scarlet facings, yellow buttons

1865: white tatarka, light blue ulanka and trousers, madder red facings, yellow buttons

1868: white Tatarka, light blue Ulanka, madder red trousers and facings, yellow buttons

1876: white czapka, light blue ulanka, madder red facings and boot trousers, yellow buttons

1915-1918: hechtgrau ulanka, trousers and czapka, red facings, yellow buttons

After 1916 gas masks and stahlhelms were issued.

== Equipment ==
During the early 19th century the four uhlan regiments were issued with a lance, sword and flintlock horse pistol. In 1852 their armament was increased to two firearms, either a pair of cap and ball pistols or one pistol and a breechloading carbine. The first regulation pattern Gasser M1870 revolvers were issued in 1871.

During World War I each uhlan was equipped with a lance, 1869 or 1877 pattern pallasch, mannlicher carbine, and a semi-automatic pistol such as the Mauser C96 or 1907 pattern Roth-Steyr that replaced the Rast & Gasser M1898 revolvers. All Austro-Hungarian uhlan regiments carried black and yellow pennons on their lances.

== Outline ==
A regiment in the Austro-Hungarian cavalry usually originally consisted of three to four (in exceptional cases more) divisions. (Division was used here to describe a unit in battalion strength. The correct division was called an infantry or cavalry troop division.) Each division had three squadrons, each of which consisted of two companies. The number of riders in the individual subunits fluctuated, but was usually around 160 riders per squadron.

The Ruthenian and Polish enlisted troopers were commanded by German-speaking Austrians. Most of these officers were Roman Catholics, although there were also some Protestants and Jews. There were few commissioned officers of non-Austrian ethnicity, although Poles and Ruthenians who were fluent in German could be promoted to unteroffizier.

(During the army reform begun by Emperor Joseph II, the company structure within the cavalry had already been abandoned.)

The individual divisions were named after their formal leaders:

The 1st Division was the Colonel Division

The 2nd Division was the Lieutenant Colonel Division

The 3rd Division was the Majors Division

The 4th Division was the 2nd Majors Division

In the course of the army reform, the cavalry regiments were reduced to two divisions from 1860 onwards.

== Honours ==
The regiment had a golden holder's jubilee medal, awarded by the Supreme Letter of Order of 30 November 1898, to be worn on a silver trumpet of honour. On the obverse, it showed the relief portrait of the emperor in the owner's uniform, the inscription "Franz Joseph I:" and the shield of the Most High coat of arms with crown. The reverse contained the dedication: "The owner of his Uhlan regiment No. 4, 1848 - 1898". The trumpet of honour was decorated with gold relief and an embroidered gold fabric hanging.

== See also ==
Imperial and Royal Uhlans

2nd Galician Uhlans

6th Kaniow Uhlan Regiment, a polish cavalry regiment in which many Polish veterans from the Austrian and Russian cavalry enlisted during the Polish-Bolshevik War
