= Ludwig Koch =

Ludwig Koch is the name of:

- Ludwig Koch (painter) (1866–1934), Austrian equestrian painter
- Ludwig Carl Christian Koch (1825–1908), German entomologist and arachnologist
- Ludwig Koch (sound recordist) (1881–1974), German-born British broadcaster and wildlife sound recordist
- Ludwig Koch, father of kidnap victim Natascha Kampusch

== See also ==
- Carl Ludwig Koch (1778–1857), German entomologist and arachnologist
