= Count Radetzky's 5th Hussar Regiment =

5th Hussar Regiment
- Husaren-Regiment „Graf Radetzky“ Nr. 5
- Active: 1798-1918
- Disbanded: 1918
- Country: Austria-Hungary
- Type: Light cavalry
- Role: Patrolling; Raiding; Reconnaissance; Screening; Shock tactics
- Size: Regiment
- Colors: Dark blue
- Engagements: War of the Second Coalition; Battle of Novi; Napoleonic Wars; Battle of the Piave; German Campaign of 1813; Battle of Tolentino; Revolutions of 1848 in the Austrian Empire; Battle of Goito; Battle of Custozza; World War I

The 5th Hussar Regiment, or Count Radetzky's 5th Hussar Regiment, was set up as an Austrian-Habsburg cavalry association. The unit then existed in the Imperial and Royal or Common Army within the Austro-Hungarian Army until its dissolution in 1918. All names of the regiments were deleted in 1915 without replacement. From then on, the regiment was referred to as "Hussar Regiment No. 5". Despite this order, it was not easily maintained, as the name was printed on numerous legal documents and stamps still in circulation.

== Order in 1914 ==
=== Formation ===
On 28 April 1798 the 5th Hussars were formed in Varaždin, Croatia from the 1st Hussars of the Kaiser, 2nd Hussars of Archduke Joseph, 8th Hussars of Wurmser, and 9th Hussars of Erdödy.

In 1860 the regiment had to disband a squadron formed from the 4th division of the 1st Volunteer Hussar Regiment.

== Peaceful garrisons ==
I.
- 1798–99 Varaždin
- 1801–05 Conegliano
- 1806 Kőszeg and Sopron
- 1808–09 Osijek
- 1810 Varaždin und Nagykanizsa
- 1811–13 Esseg
- 1814–15 Bologna
- 1815 Crema
- 1816 Cremona
- 1818 Milan
- 1821 Alessandria and Pavia
II.
- 1822 Vercelli and Milan
- 1823 Alessandria and Lodi
- 1825 Cremona
- 1826 Hódmezővásárhely
- 1827 Vienna
- 1828 Nagy-Tapolcsán
- 1831 Milan
- 1839–48 Lodi
- 1849 Milan
- 1853 Vicenza
- 1854 Groß-Enzersdorf
III.
- 1855 Wels
- 1857–59 Žatec
- 1864–66 Enns
- 1866 Horodok
- 1869 Ternopil
- 1871 Wien
- 1874 Győr
- 1878 Pardubice
- 1884 Kőszeg
- 1889 Vienna
- 1893 Bratislava
- 1905 Komárom

== Regiment leaders ==
Years	Leader
1798-1801	Vacant
1801-1809	Lieutenant field marshal Carl Otto Freiherr von Bártokéz
1809-1814	Lieutenant field marshal Joseph Graf Radetzky von Radetz
1814-1820	Prince Regent George IV of the United Kingdom
1820-1830	King George IV of the United Kingdom
1830-1831	General of the Cavalry Josef Wenzel Graf Radetzky von Radetz
1831-1848	Carl Albert, King of Sardinia
1848-1858	Generalfeldmarschall Josef Wenzel Graf Radetzky von Radetz
1858-1871	Lieutenant field marshal Wilhelm Albert, Prince of Montenuovo

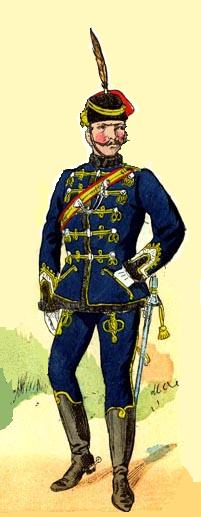
Regiment officer in 1865

== Major battles ==
War of the Second Coalition

In 1799, in the midst of the War of the Second Coalition, the regiment, under the leadership of Count Radetzky, fought with the Neapolitan army in Italy at Verona-Pastrengo, Parona, Magnano and took part in the sieges of Pizzighettone, Milan, Alessandria and Tortona. For his service in these battles, Radetzky was promoted from captain to colonel. The regiment was also involved in the Battle of Novi.

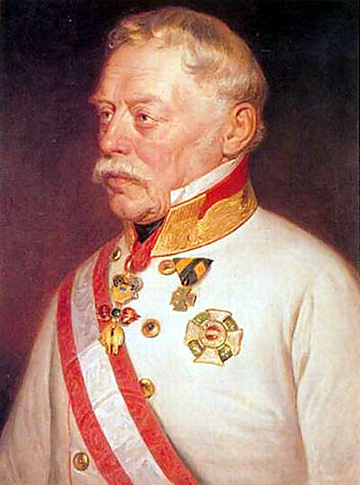
Field marshal Graf Radetzky

Certain squadrons fought at Cremona, S Giuliano, Fressonara, Acqui, and Pasturana.

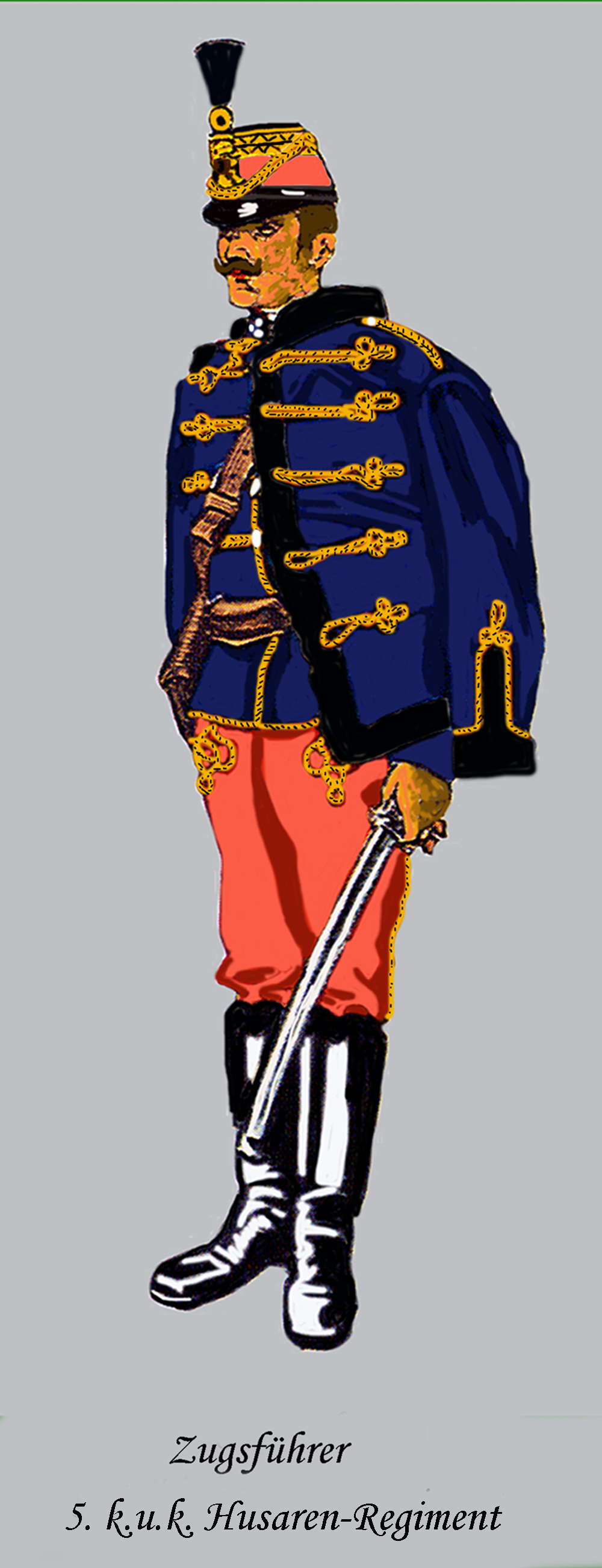
Uniform from 1916

In 1800, the regiment made forays on the Genoa river, fought at Bocchetta, Cremona and in the Battle of Marengo. They had also participated in a skirmish at Pozzolo-Valeggio.

=== Napoleonic Wars ===
During the Napoleonic Wars, the Imperial and Royal Hussars maintained positions in Italy and Slovenia. In 1805, the regiment retreated from battles at Gonars on the Tagliamento. In 1809, a squadron under Major Luszensky fought a battle at Kobarid, where the regiment fought with great losses at Sacile. They had also participated in the Battle of the Piave. Streifkorps led battles at San Daniele, Tarvisio, and Raab.

German Campaign of 1813

In 1813, three divisions fought at Inner Austria near Višnja Gora, Šmarje-Sap, Velike Lašče, and Cerknica. One division excelled at the Podpetsch bridge near Kranj, where a division of French soldiers from the Berlotti division were captured. Another division fought in Istria near Castelnuovo. After the regiment was brought together, it took part in the persecution fights over the Soča.

In 1814, the regiment operated in the area around Parma. The Streifkorps fought at Cadeo, Fiorenzuola, Pontremoli, Parma, Reggio and on the Nura. One division was assigned to the siege of Venice, two to the siege of Mantua.

In 1815, battles against Marshal Joachim Murat's troops. Parts of the regiment had battles at Catoliea, Panaro, Rubiera and fought in the Battle of Tolentino. They then invaded and placed occupation forces in southern France.

Risorgimento

In 1821, a division took part in the campaign for Naples. The rest of the Italian federation stood with three divisions in Piedmont to fight the unrest there.

Revolutions of 1848 in the Austrian Empire

After the outbreak of the revolution in 1848, the regiment was used to quell street fighting in Milan. This was followed by involvement in the battles at Goito. Part of the regiment fought in the Battle of Custozza. The Streifkorps fought at Vicenza, Valeggio and Le sei Vie.

In 1849 a division was set to patrol Borgo San Siro and Vigevano, while another fought at Gamboló and advanced to Romagna.

=== World War I ===
During the First World War, the hussars were exposed to a wide variety of uses. Initially, they fought as cavalry in the regimental association but were also used as infantry in all theaters of war. As with all schools of cavalry in Austria-Hungary, the old horseback tactics were abandoned in light of high casualties.

After Hungary was proclamated an independent state in October 1918, the interim government called upon the Hungarian-born soldiers to stop fighting and return home.

== Structure ==
A regiment in the Austro-Hungarian Cavalry usually consisted of three to four divisions; each division was the size of a battalion. Each division had three squadrons, each of which consisted of two companies. The number of riders in the individual subunits fluctuated, but was usually around 80 riders per company.

Each division was named after their respective leader: The 1st division was the colonel division, the 2nd division was the lieutenant colonel (lieutenant colonel) division, the 3rd division was the majors division, and the 4th division was the 2nd majors division

In the course of army reform, the cavalry regiments, which consisted of three divisions, were reduced to two divisions in 1860.

Until 1798 the regiments were named after their respective owners. There was no binding regulation of the spelling (e.g. Regiment Graf Serbelloni - or Regiment Serbelloni). With each change of ownership, the respective regiment changed its name. After 1798, the numbered name was primarily used, which could possibly be linked to the name of the owner. In addition, there is the constant and apparently arbitrary, sometimes multiple reclassification of the associations.

== See also ==
- Imperial and Royal Hussars
