= Imperial and Royal Hussars =

Austro-Hungarian cavalry unit (1867–1918)

Together with the Dragoons and Uhlans, the Imperial and Royal Hussars (German: k.u.k. Husaren), made up the cavalry of the Austro-Hungarian Army from 1867 to 1918, both in the Common Army and in the Hungarian Landwehr, where they were known as the Royal Hungarian Hussars (k.u. Husaren).

The Austrian monarchy, weakened by losing the war against Prussia in 1866, had to effectively guarantee the autonomy of Kingdom of Hungary in the so-called Compromise of 15 March 1867. As a result, the Hungarian half of the Empire immediately began to establish its own army, the Royal Hungarian Landwehr (Hungarian: Magyar Királyi Honvédség). The cavalry of the Hungarian Landwehr was made up of the Landwehr Hussars.

Following the signing of the Compromise, the Austrian half of the Empire also started to build an army, the Imperial-Royal Landwehr (German: k.k. Landwehr). The two new Landwehr forces thus existed alongside the Common Army (Gemeinsame Armee), the imperial army of the whole Empire. In effect this meant that Austria-Hungary had three separate armies at the same time.

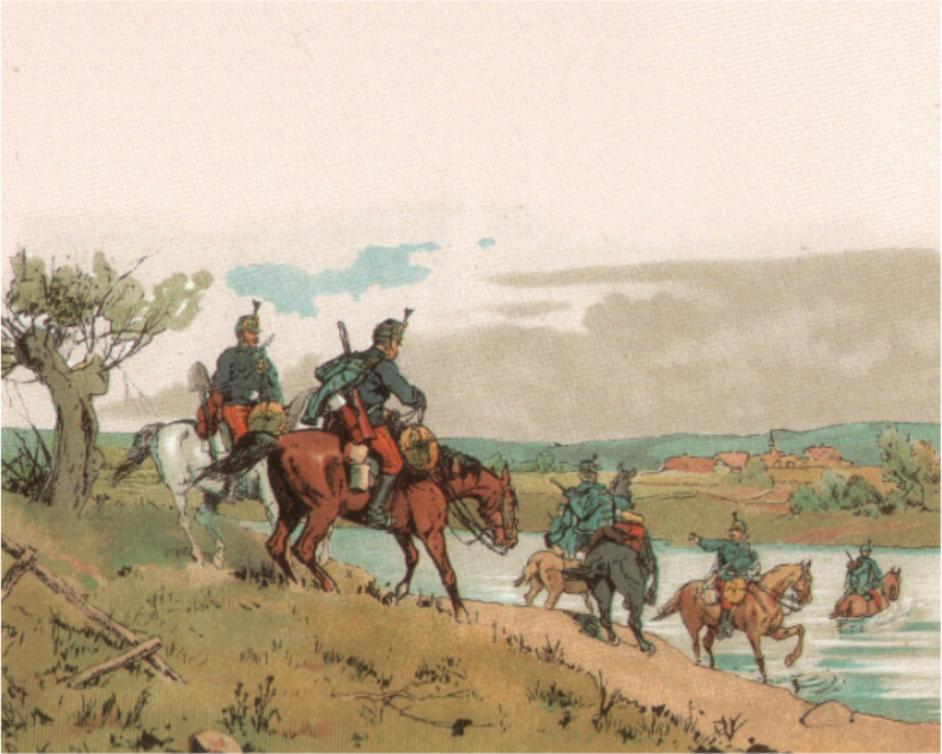
Imperial and Royal Hussars around 1910

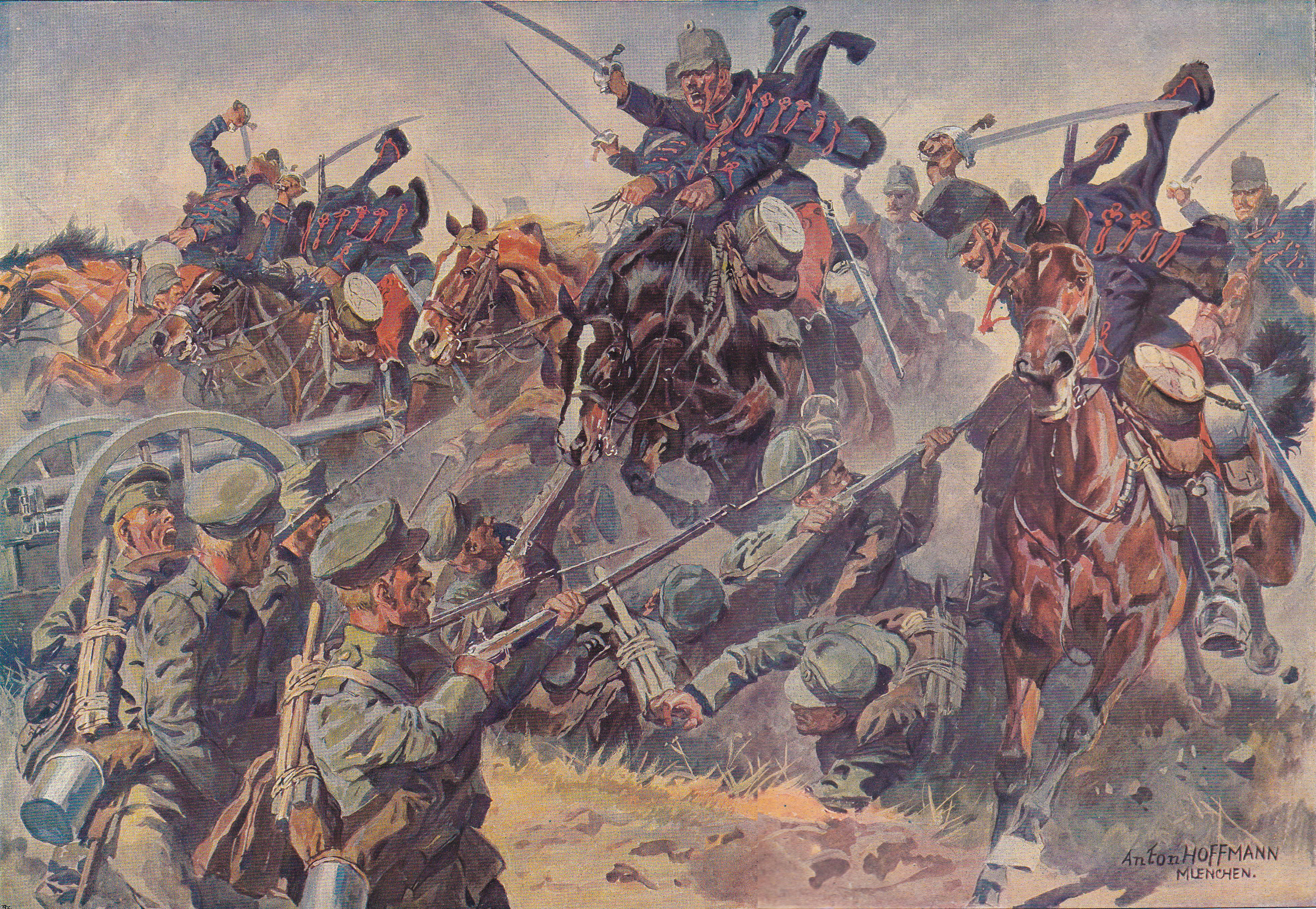
Hungarian Hussars attack in Krasnik, Poland 23. August 1914

== Organisation ==
The Common Army had 16 hussar regiments and the Royal Hungarian Landwehr had ten. By tradition, the majority of the hussars were recruited from the Hungarian lands (modern-day Hungary, Slovakia and parts of Romania, Serbia, Croatia, Austria and Poland). The regiments, with a few exceptions, were all stationed there.

- The Imperial and Royal Cavalry regiments each had two divisions (battalions) each of three squadrons (Eskadronen)

== The Imperial and Royal Hussars in 1914 ==
A list of the Imperial and Royal Hussars regiments in 1914 is given below by short title (i.e. "1st Hussars" as opposed to "1st Regiment of Hussars").

- 1st Hussars (Emperor) (Husaren-Regiment „Kaiser“ Nr. 1)
- 2nd Hussars (Frederick Leopold of Prussia's) (Husaren-Regiment „Friedrich Leopold von Preußen“ Nr. 2)

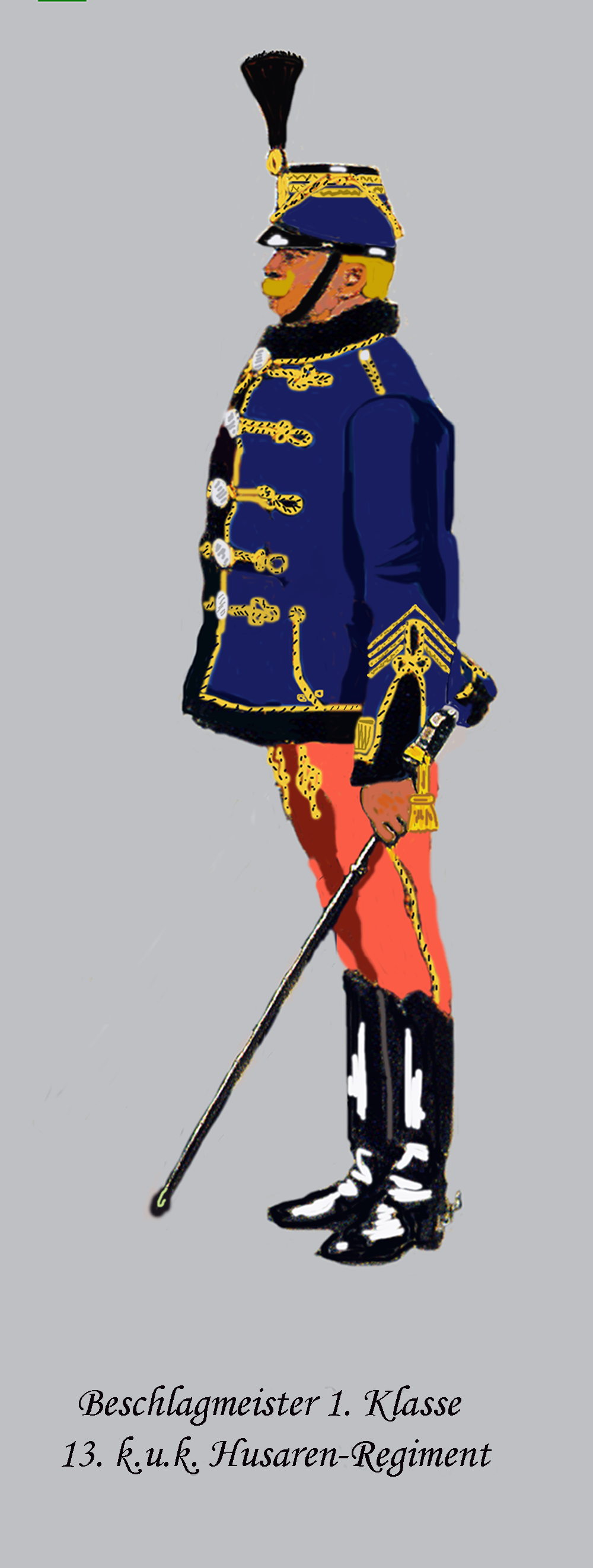
Master Farrier, 13th Hussars

- 3rd Hussars (Count of Hadik's) (Husaren-Regiment „Graf von Hadik“ Nr. 3)
- 4th Hussars (Arthur, Duke of Connaught and Strathearn's) (Husaren-Regiment „Arthur Herzog von Connaught und Strathearn“ Nr. 4)
- 5th Hussars (Count Radetzky's) (Husaren-Regiment „Graf Radetzky“ Nr. 5)
- 6th Hussars (King William II of Württemberg's) (Husaren-Regiment „Wilhelm II. König von Württemberg“ Nr. 6)
- 7th Hussars (William II, German Emperor and King of Prussia's) (Jazigier und Kumanier Husaren-Regiment „Wilhelm II. Deutscher Kaiser und König von Preußen“ Nr. 7)
- 8th Hussars (von Terstyanski's) (Husaren-Regiment „von Tersztyánszky“ Nr. 8)
- 9th Hussars (Count Nadasdy's) (Husaren-Regiment „Graf Nádasdy“ Nr. 9)
- 10th Hussars (King Frederick William II of Prussia's) (Husaren-Regiment „Friedrich Wilhelm III. König von Preußen“ Nr. 10)
- 11th Hussars (King Ferdinand I of the Bulgarians) (Husaren-Regiment „Ferdinand I. König der Bulgaren“ Nr. 11)
- 12th Hussars (vacant) (Husaren-Regiment (Vacant) Nr. 12)
- 13th Hussars (Crown Prince William of the German Empire and Prussia) (Husaren-Regiment „Wilhelm Kronprinz des Deutschen Reiches und Kronprinz von Preußen“ Nr. 13)
- 14th Hussars (von Kolossvary's) (Husaren-Regiment „von Kolossváry“ Nr. 14)

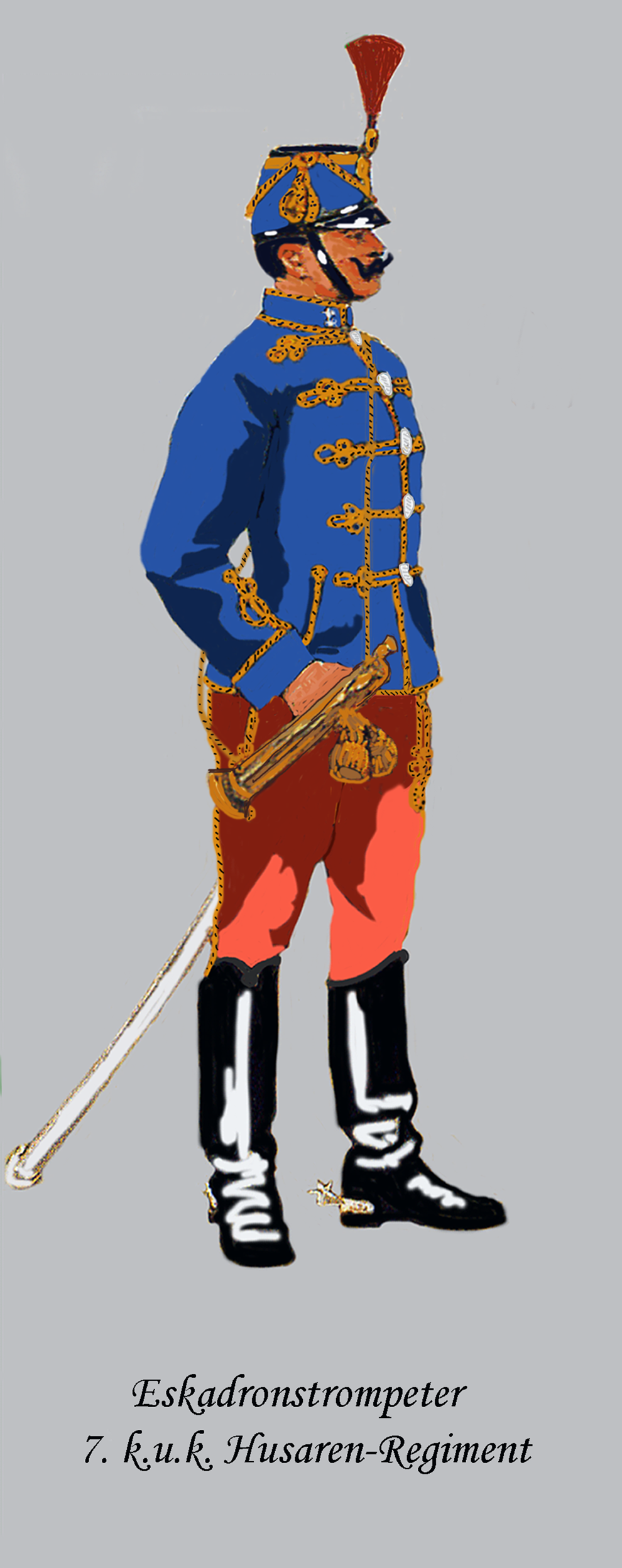
Bugler, 7th Hussars (wearing a light blue atilla)

- 15th Hussars (Archduke Franz Salvator's) (Husaren-Regiment „Erzherzog Franz Salvator“ Nr. 15)
- 16th Hussars (Count Üxküll-Gyllenband's) (Husaren-Regiment „Graf Üxküll-Gyllenband“ Nr. 16)

== Royal Hungarian Hussars ==
The regiments listed below were part of the Royal Hungarian Hussars, also known as the Royal Hungarian Honved Hussars (k.u. Husaren), Honvéd being Hungarian for "Home-defender". English sources usually refer to regiments simply as e.g. the "1st Hussars" or "1st Honved Hussars".:

- 1st Hussars (Budapest) (Budapester Honvéd Husaren Rgt 1)

19th Cavalry Brigade, 5th Cavalry Division (19. Honvéd Kavallerie Brigade - 5. Honvéd Kavallerie Division)
Commander: Colonel Colbert Zech von Deybach Freiherr von Hart und Sulz - Debachi Zech Colbert harti ès sulzi baró ezredes

- 2nd Hussars (Debrezin) (Debreczener Honvéd Husaren Rgt 2)

22nd Cavalry Brigade, 11th Cavalry Division (22. Honvéd Kavallerie Brigade - 11. Honvéd Kavallerie Truppendivision)
Kommandant: Lieutenant Colonel Johann Flór - Flór János alezredes

- 3rd Hussars (Szeged) (Szegeder Honvéd Husaren Rgt 3)

22nd Cavalry Brigade, 11th Cavalry Division
Commander: Lieutenant Colonel Árpád Cserépy von Kisruszka - Kisruszkai Cserépy Árpád alezredes

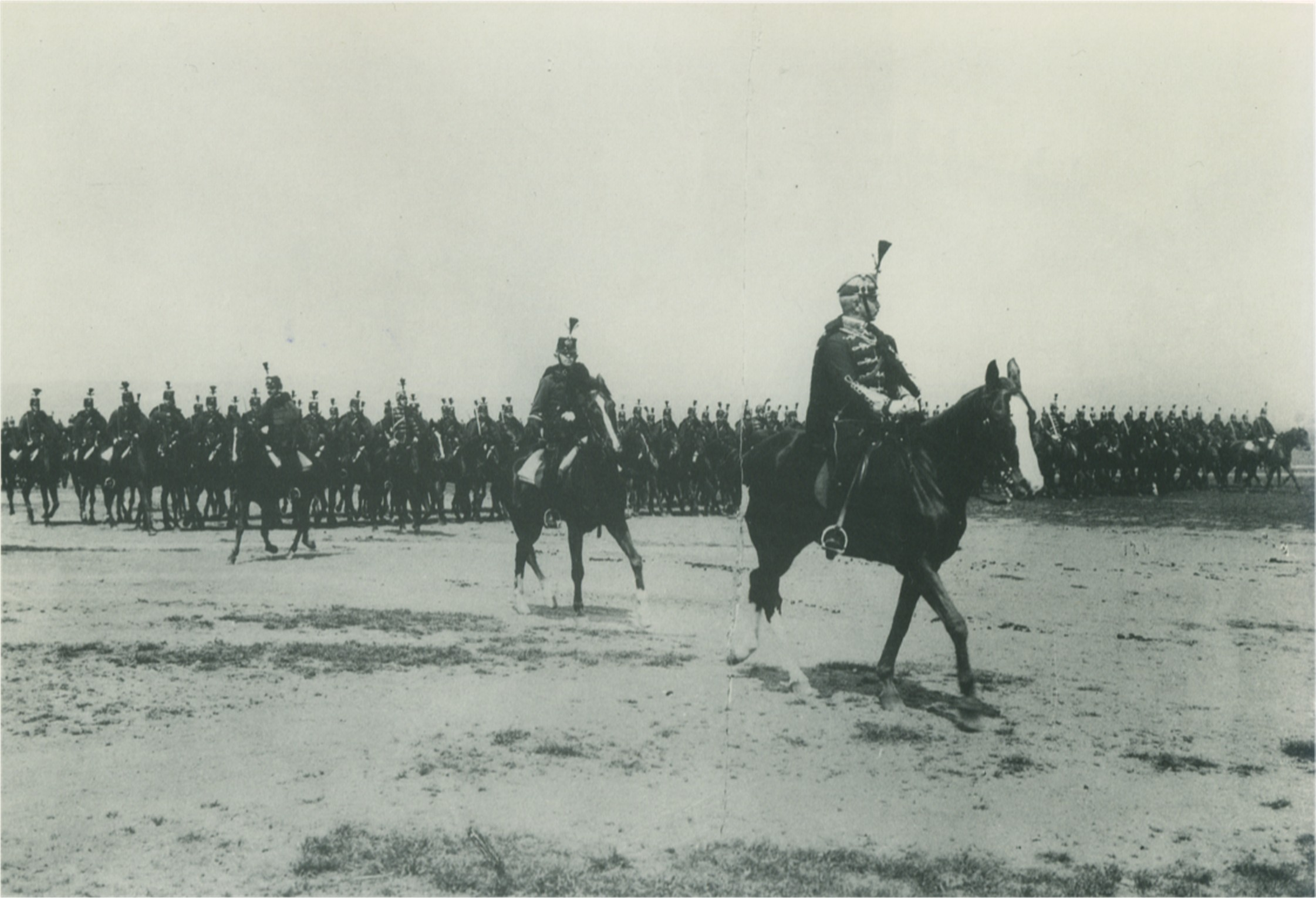
Imperial and Royal Hussars on parade

- 4th Hussars (Szabadka) (Szabadkaer Honvéd Husaren Rgt 4)

I and II Squadrons, 23rd Infantry Division (I., II. Esk. 23. Honvéd Infanterie Truppendivision)
III and IV Squadrons, 20th Infantry Division
V and VI Squadrons, 41st Infantry Division
Commander: Lieutenant Colonel Nikolaus Jankovich von Jeszenicze - Jesceniczai Jankovich Miklos alezredes

- 5th Hussars (Kassa) (Kassaer Honvéd Husaren Rgt 5)

24th Cavalry Brigade, 11th Cavalry Division
Commander: Colonel Paul Hegedüs - Hegedüs Pál ezredes

- 6th Hussars (Zalaegerszeg) (Zalaegerszeger Honvéd Husaren Rgt 6)

23rd Cavalry Brigade, 5th Cavalry Division
Commander: Lieutenant Colonel Ladislaus Forster von Szenterzsébet - Szenterzsébeti Forster László alezredes

- 7th Hussars (Pápa) (Pápaer Honvéd Husaren Rgt 7)

23rd Cavalry Brigade, 5th Cavalry Division
Commander: Colonel Johann Graf Lubienski - Gróf Lubienski János ezredes

- 8th Hussars (Pécs) (Pécser Honvéd Husaren Rgt 8)

19th Cavalry Brigade - 5th Cavalry Division
Commander: Lieutenant Colonel Alexius Thege von Konkily - Konkoly Thege Elek alezredes

- 9th Hussars (Marosvásárhely) (Maros-Vásárhelyer Honvéd Husaren Rgt 9)

24th Cavalry Brigade, 1st Cavalry Division
Commander: Colonel Koloman Géczy von Garamszeg - Garamszegi Gèczy Kálmán ezredes

- 10th Hussars (Varaždin) (Varaždiner Honvéd Husaren Rgt 10)

I and II Sqns, 36th Infantry Division
III and IV Sqns, 42nd Infantry Division
V and VI Sqns, 13th Infantry Brigade
Commander: Lieutenant Colonel Alois Hauer - Hauer Alajos alezredes

Shako-coating of the k.u.k. Hussars Regiment

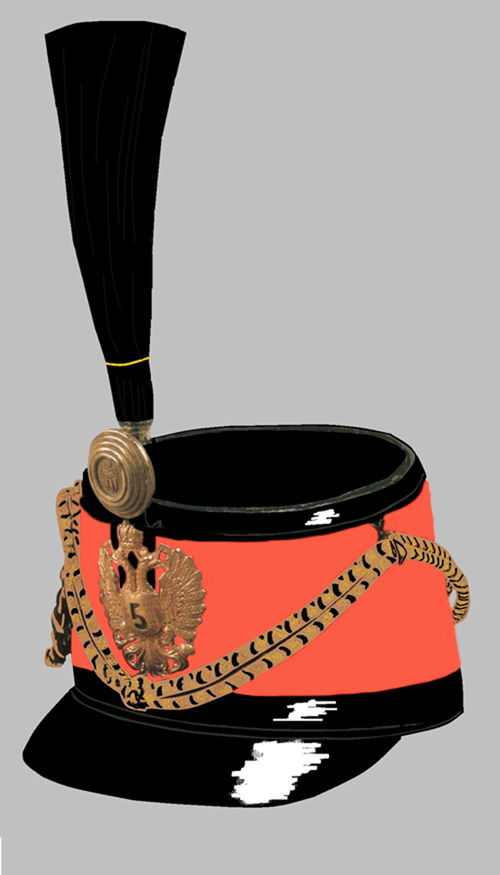
brick-red
4th, 5th, 8th and 14th Hussars

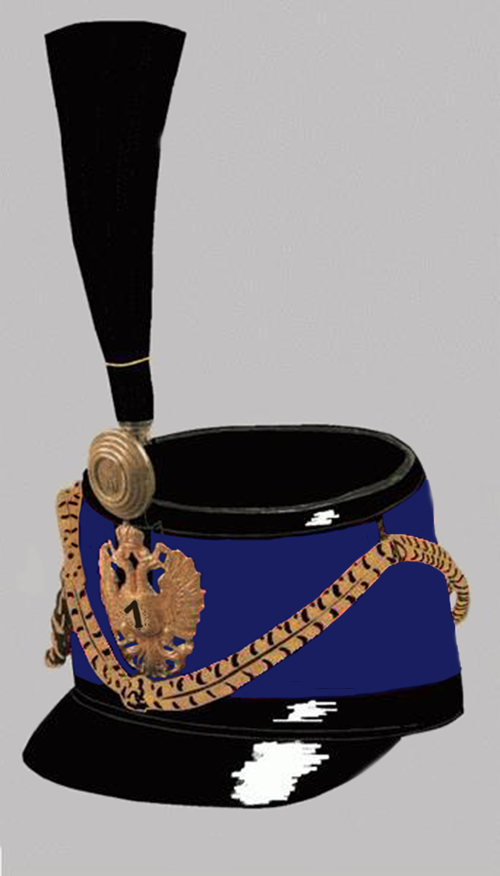
dark-blue
1st and 13th Hussars

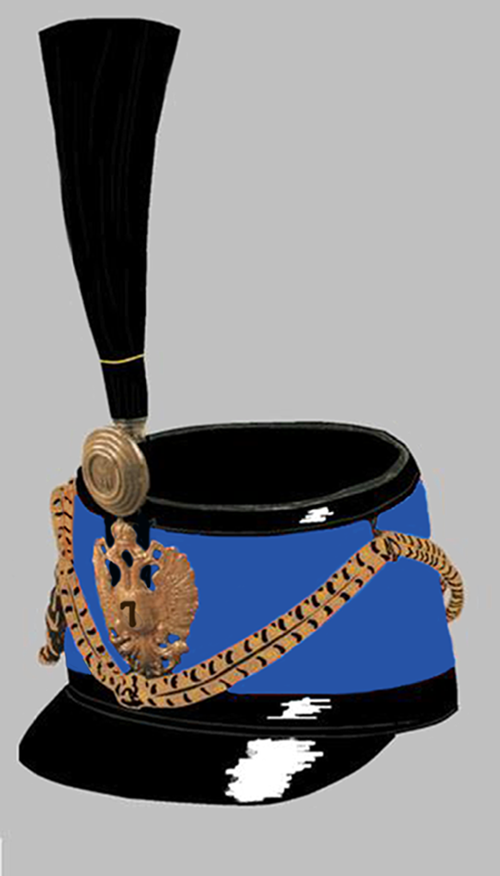
light-blue
7th and 10th Hussars

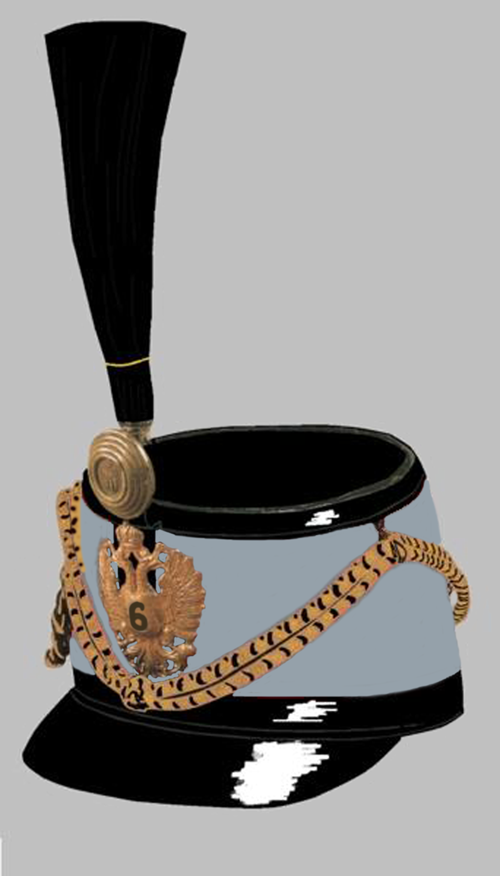
ash-grey
6th, 11th, 15th and 16th Hussars

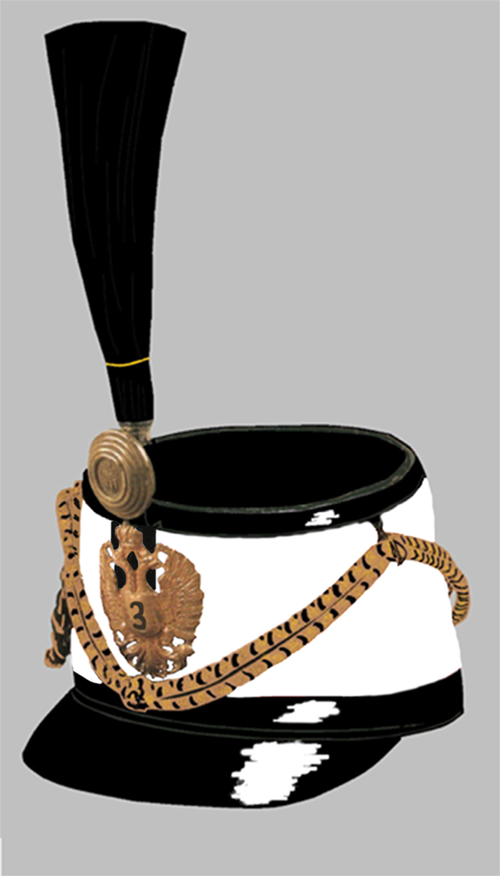
white
2nd, 3rd, 9th and 12th Hussars

== Literature ==
- Johann C. Allmayer-Beck, Erich Lessing: Die K.u.k. Armee. 1848-1918. Verlag Bertelsmann, München 1974, ISBN 3-570-07287-8.
- Stefan Rest: Des Kaisers Rock im ersten Weltkrieg. Verlag Militaria, Wien 2002, ISBN 3-9501642-0-0
- Das k.u.k. Heer im Jahre 1895 Schriften des Heeresgeschichtlichen Museums in Wien - Stocker Verlag, Graz 1997
- k.u.k. Kriegsministerium „Dislokation und Einteilung des k.u.k Heeres, der k.u.k. Kriegsmarine, der k.k. Landwehr und der k.u. Landwehr“ in: Seidels kleines Armeeschema - Herausg.: Seidel & Sohn Wien 1914
- k.u.k. Kriegsministerium „Adjustierungsvorschrift für das k.u.k. Heer, die k.k. Landwehr, die k.u. Landwehr, die verbundenen Einrichtungen und das Korps der Militärbeamten“ Wien 1911/1912
