= 1st Galician Uhlans (Ritter von Brudermann's) =

Austro-Hungarian Army unit

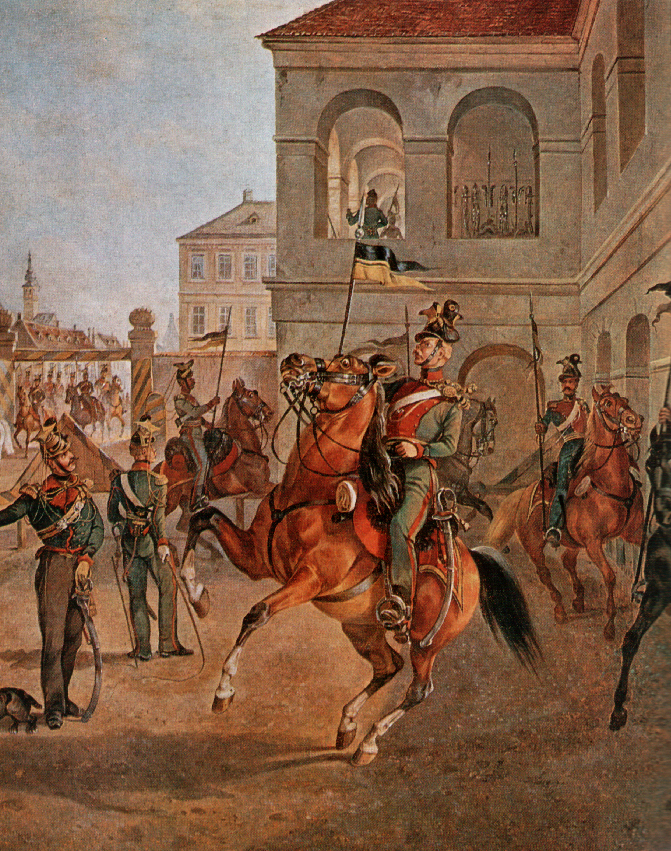
1st Uhlans at the riding school in Vienna

The 1st Uhlan Regiment of the Austro-Hungarian Army was established in 1791 and named in honor of cavalry general Rudolf von Brudermann. It saw action in the Napoleonic Wars, the Revolutions of 1848, the Sardinian War, the Austro-Prussian War, and World War I.

== History ==
On 1 November 1791, the regiment was formed with a strength of four divisions. In addition, the Chevauxlegers regiments “Kaiser,” “Karaiczay,” “Lobkowitz,” and “Levenehr” (the latter disbanded in 1860 as Dragoon Regiment No. 4) were required to give up their Uhlan divisions to supplement the new unit.

In 1798, it was assigned the designation of Uhlan Regiment No. 1.

In 1801, a corps was transferred to the newly established Uhlan Regiment No. 3. Carbines were issued to the troops in the two flank divisions to provide additional fire support to the lancers of the central divisions, who led the cavalry charge.

In 1809, the cavalry (Uhlans) was incorporated into the Franconian Legion.

In 1860, the 4th Division, which had become surplus after the reorganisation of the cavalry, was transferred to the newly formed Volunteer Uhlan Regiment (later re-designated as Count Trani No. 13).

During its history of service, the regiment was named in honor of multiple individuals, including Josef Meszaros, Archduke Otto Franz, and cavalry general Rudolf von Brudermann, during the 1790s, 1890s, and World War I, respectively.

== Additions ==
Since its formation, the regiment was recruited from Galicia.

- In 1853, recruits were added from the district of Infantry Regiment No. 56 (Wadowice).
- Between 1857 and 1860, recruits were added from the districts of Infantry Regiments No. 20 and 56 (Nový Sącz and Wadowice).
- From 1867 to 1889, recruits were added from the districts of Infantry Regiments No. 13 and 56 (Krakow and Wadowice).
- From 1890 onwards, the regiment was assigned to the 1st Corps (Military Territorial District of Krakow), with recruitment continuing from the same area.

== Peace garrisons ==
- 1791: Sáros-Patak, then Rosenau
- 1793–94: Lodi
- 1798–99: Straubing
- 1801–05: Pardubice
- 1806: Gabel, then Bischof-Teinitz
- 1807–09: Klattau
- 1810: Pardubice
- 1811: Gaja, then Gyöngyös
- 1812–13: Nagy-Tapolcsán
- 1814–15: Debreczin
- 1815: St. Florian
- 1816: Oradea
- 1817: Vienna
- 1818: Saaz
- 1843: Vienna
- 1845–48: Pardubice
- 1849: Neusohl
- 1850: St. Georgen, then Beraun
- 1851: St. Georgen
- 1854: Krakow
- 1855–59: Wessely
- 1860: Wessely
- 1862: Moravian New Town
- 1863–66: Tarnów
- 1866: Lugos
- 1868: Temesvár
- 1871: Oedenburg
- 1876: Tarnów
- 1880: Krakow
- 1895: Vienna
- 1899: Monastyryska
- 1914: Staff, I. Div.: Lviv – II. Div.: Mosty Wielkie (Galicia/today Ukraine)

== Regimental holders ==
- 1792: Field Marshal Lieutenant Johann Mészáros von Szoboszló (Uhlan Regiment Mészáros)
- 1797: General of the Cavalry Maximilian Graf von Merveldt (Uhlan Regiment Graf Merveldt)
- 1815: General of the Cavalry Ernst I, Duke of Saxe-Coburg-Gotha (Ulanenregiment Sachsen-Coburg)
- 1844: General of the Cavalry Carl Graf Civalart (Ulanenregiment Graf Civalart)
- 1865: General of the Cavalry Karl Ludwig von Grünne (Ulanenregiment Grunne)
- 1884–85: vacant
- 1885: Field Marshal Lieutenant Crown Prince Archduke Rudolf (Ulanenregiment Erzherzog Rudolf)
- 1889–94: vacant
- 1894: Field Marshal Lieutenant Archduke Otto (Ulanenregiment Erzherzog Otto)
- 1906: General of the Cavalry Ritter Rudolf von Brudermann (Ulanenregiment Ritter von Brudermann)

== Regimental commanders ==
- 1791: Colonel Anton Freiherr von Schubirz
- 1796: Colonel Ezekiel von Mattyásovszky
- 1798: Colonel Achilles of Brea
- 1800: Colonel Ludwig Graf Wallmoden-Gimborn
- 1807: Colonel Joseph Freiherr von Bogdan
- 1809: Colonel Ludwig Freiherr von Wilgenheim
- 1814: Colonel Bartholomew Count Alberti de Poja
- 1819: Colonel Wilhelm Freiherr von Hammerstein-Ecquord
- 1823: Colonel Friedrich Anton Prince Hohenzollern-Hechingen
- 1831: Colonel Cornelius Freiherr von Dankelmann
- 1838: Colonel Adolph von Mengen
- 1845: Colonel Carl von Almásy
- 1849: Colonel Hermann Graf Nostitz-Rieneck
- 1851: Colonel Wilhelm Freiherr von Koller
- 1858: Colonel Adolph von Mengen
- 1865: Colonel Friedrich Ziegler von Klipphausen
- 1869: Colonel Eduard Freiherr Fleissner von Wostrowitz
- 1870: Colonel Alexander Graf Kálnoky de Köröspatak
- 1874: Colonel Carl Freiherr von Lasollaye
- 1878: Lieutenant Colonel Rudolph Graf Grünne
- 1878: Lieutenant Colonel Franz Kunz
- 1882: Colonel Otto Freiherr von Gemmingen-Guttenberg
- 1887: Lieutenant Colonel Albert Graf Nostitz-Rieneck
- 1892: Colonel Carl Freiherr Dlauhovesky von Langendorf
- 1898: Colonel Oscar Graf Ludolf
- 1903–1907: Colonel Emil Swoboda
- 1909–1912: Colonel Eugen Chevalier Ruiz de Roxas
- 1913–1914: Colonel Friedrich Weiß von Schleusenburg

== Battle calendar ==
=== Coalition Wars ===
1794: Deployed to the theatre of war in Italy

1795: Detachments of the regiment fought at Savona and San Giacomo, where Captain Brochowsky earned the Order of Maria Theresa. Battles at Voltri and Loano.

1796: Six squadrons fought at Voltri, Milessimo, Codogno and Lodi. There, Captain von Domokos covered the retreat of the Sebottendorf Corps with the Lieutenant Colonel's 2nd Squadron and earned the Order of Maria Theresa. After the fighting at the beginning of August, two squadrons joined the Davidivich Corps, the others the main army. The latter then fought at Calliano, Bassano, Castellaro and la Favorita and were pushed with the rest of Wurmser's troops into the fortress of Mantua, in the defense of which they participated. The 2nd Majors Division fought at Caldiero, Arcole and Rivoli.

1797: After the capitulation of Mantua, the six squadrons that had been deployed there moved to the hereditary lands. The 2nd Major's Division withdrew to Carinthia and had no combat activity. After the armistice, a squadron was used in the occupation of Dalmatia.

1799: Commanded back to Germany, the regiment fought in the Battle of Ostrach. Later it was detached to the Sztáray Corps, which remained on the Middle Rhine, where it performed patrol and outpost duty. The regiment was involved in the defence of the posts at Kehl.

1800: Battles at Möskirch, Biberach, Schwabmünchen, in the Battle of Neresheim and at Odelzhausen. In June, Lieutenant Colonel Wallmoden undertook a foray into the Murg and Kinzig valleys. In late autumn, the regiment was stationed near Regensburg, from where detachments undertook various expeditions, for example under cavalry captain Karl Wilhelm von Scheibler, whose detachment was involved in a skirmish with a French cuirassier regiment near Oettingen in Bavaria.

1805: Six squadrons were in Kienmayer's corps in Germany. The Lieutenant Colonel Division belonged to the Reserve Corps, joined Archduke Ferdinand's corps after the Battle of Ulm and fought in the Battle of Stecken. On the retreat of the corps (now Corps Merveldt) to Ober-Steyer, Captain Freiherr von Mengen distinguished himself with a detachment squadron in the liberation of two infantry battalions of the rearguard that had already been cut off, for which he was awarded the Military Maria Theresa Order. Captain Scheibler, who had distinguished himself during the retreat by raising an enemy post in Urfahr, was promoted out of turn to major in the Rosenberg-Chevauxlegers regiment.

1809: Assigned to the II Corps Kolowrat in Germany. Here, Major Graf Mensdorff distinguished himself in the battle of the vanguard at Ursensollen-Amberg. Detachments of the regiment took part in the capture of the city of Hof and the battles near Regensburg. Here, on 21 April, a squadron was surrounded by French cavalry, but was able to free itself from the encirclement, albeit with heavy losses. Later, six squadrons were transferred to the Sommariva Division, where they took part in various battles and carried out patrols in detachments. In July, it was transferred to Bohemia, where the 1st Major's Division was already located. This had already taken part in the operations against Saxony, the battles at Gefrees, Nuremberg and other battles. Lieutenant Colonel Mensdorff was awarded the Military Maria Theresa Order, Captain Mengen was promoted to major in the Uhlan Regiment No. 3.

=== Wars of Liberation ===
In 1813, the regiment was stationed in Inner Austria with three divisions. Two divisions were engaged in the defence of Loibl, divisions of the Lieutenant Colonel's Division at Feistritz, Lippa and Krainberg. In the further advance into Italy, detachments fought at Bassano del Grappa and San Marco; two squadrons were in front of Palmanova.

In 1814, the regiment was distributed in the vicinity of Mantua to the Po and carried out several skirmishes. At Volta, Lieutenant Fausch succeeded in freeing a company of the 10th Feldjäger Battalion, which had already been cut off. A squadron took part in the battle at Monzambano.

=== Reign of the Hundred Days ===
1815: In the army in France. Entry into Paris.

=== Revolution of 1848/1849 in the Austrian Empire ===
In 1848, the regiment took part in the suppression of the uprising in Prague and then moved under Field Marshal Prince Windisch-Graetz to subjugate Vienna, where it fought in the Battle of Schwechat. During the advance to Hungary, the Lieutenants Colonel's Division fought a battle near Bábolna.

In 1849, detachments took part in the battles of Waitzen and Schemnitz, as well as in the Battle of Kápolna, in which the 2nd Major's Division excelled. Battles at Kál and Eger-Farmos. A patrol detachment under Colonel Almásy was ambushed near Losoncz and suffered great losses. One division fought at Hatvan and Puszta-Csem (Komárno). In the summer campaign, 5½ squadrons were partly at Komárno, partly at the Váh and took part in the battles at Vásárút, Böös, Aszód, and the Battle of Pered. Then they came to the siege of Komárno, where they remained until the end of the campaign. In the Battle of Puszta-Herkály on 3 August, the regiment under the command of Count Nostitz covered the retreat of three battalions and all the artillery. In the process, it suffered heavy losses. Half a squadron took part in the campaign of the Southern Army under Banus Joseph Jelačić von Bužim, the 1st Major's Division moved from Bohemia to Hungary in June and was assigned to the Russian Paniutine Division.

=== Sardinian War ===
In 1859, the regiment was in Italy, individual detachments led outposts and patrol duties. Battles at Borgo Vercelli and Novara. At the Battle of Magenta, the regiment was only used with the 4th Squadron. In the Battle of Solferino, the unit fought with distinction.

=== Austro-Prussian War ===
In 1866, five squadrons were on outpost duty with the troops under Field Marshal Lieutenant Rzikowsky on the Galician-Prussian border. In the Battle of Auschwitz, the 4th and 5th Squadrons distinguished themselves under Moritz Ritter von Lehman. The 6th Squadron fought at Kenty, Dziedzitz, Goczalkowice and in pursuit of Klapka's Legion.

=== World War I ===
In the First World War, the regiment was initially used as a closed cavalry unit as a closed unit. In particular, the regiment distinguished itself in the Battle of Jaroslawice on 21 August 1914. Since the 4th Cavalry Division, to which the regiment belonged, was to remain as a cavalry unit, it can be assumed, regardless of any infantry operations in the meantime, that the regiment was able to retain its cavalry status until the end of the war.

After the proclamation of Poland as an independent state in October 1918, soldiers of Polish and Ruthenian origin were called upon by the interim government to cease hostilities and return home. As a rule, this request was followed. Thus, the unit was withdrawn from its previous high command, the Austro-Hungarian War Ministry, and could not be demobilized by it, at best theoretically disbanded. Whether, when, and where such a dissolution took place, or whether the Uhlans were immediately incorporated into the new Polish army, is not known at present.

== Uniforms ==
1790: yellow czapka, grass-green kurtka, red facings, white tight trousers, yellow buttons

1798: imperial yellow czapka, dark green kurtka and trousers, ponceau red facings, yellow buttons

1865: yellow tartarka, light blue ulanka and trousers, madder red facings, yellow buttons

1868: imperial yellow Tatarka, light blue Ulanka, madder red boot trousers and facings, yellow buttons

1876: imperial yellow czapka, light blue ulanka, madder red facings and boot trousers, yellow buttons

During World War I, Rudolf von Brudermann refused to replace the blue ulankas and red trousers with standard issue hechtgrau uniforms because he believed camouflage was incompatible with courage.

== Outline ==
A regiment in the Austro-Hungarian cavalry usually originally consisted of three to four (in exceptional cases more) divisions. (Division was used here to describe a unit in battalion strength. The correct division was called an infantry or cavalry troop division.) Each division had three squadrons. The number of riders in the individual subunits fluctuated, but was usually around 160 riders per squadron.

The individual divisions were named after their formal leaders:

- The 1st Division was the Colonel's Division
- The 2nd Division was the Lieutenant Colonel's Division
- The 3rd Division was the Major's Division
- The 4th Division was the 2nd Major's Division
- The 5th Division (if any) was the 3rd Major's Division

Due to the constant renaming, the regimental histories of the Austro-Hungarian cavalry are very difficult to follow. In addition, there is the constant and apparently arbitrary, sometimes multiple reclassifications of the associations. (For example: K.u.k. Dragoon Regiment "Prince of Windisch-Graetz" No. 14)

In the course of the army reform, the cavalry regiments were reduced to two divisions from 1860 onwards.

== See also ==
- Imperial and Royal Uhlans
