= Imperial and Royal Uhlan Regiment "Prince of Schwarzenberg" No. 2. =

Austro-Hungarian military regiment

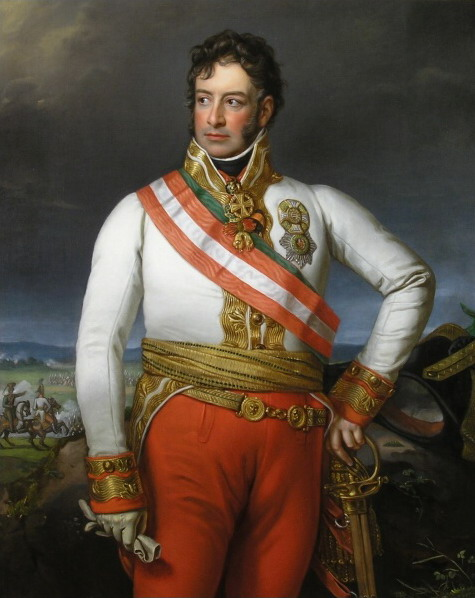
The namesake of the regiment – Karl Philipp, Prince of Schwarzenberg

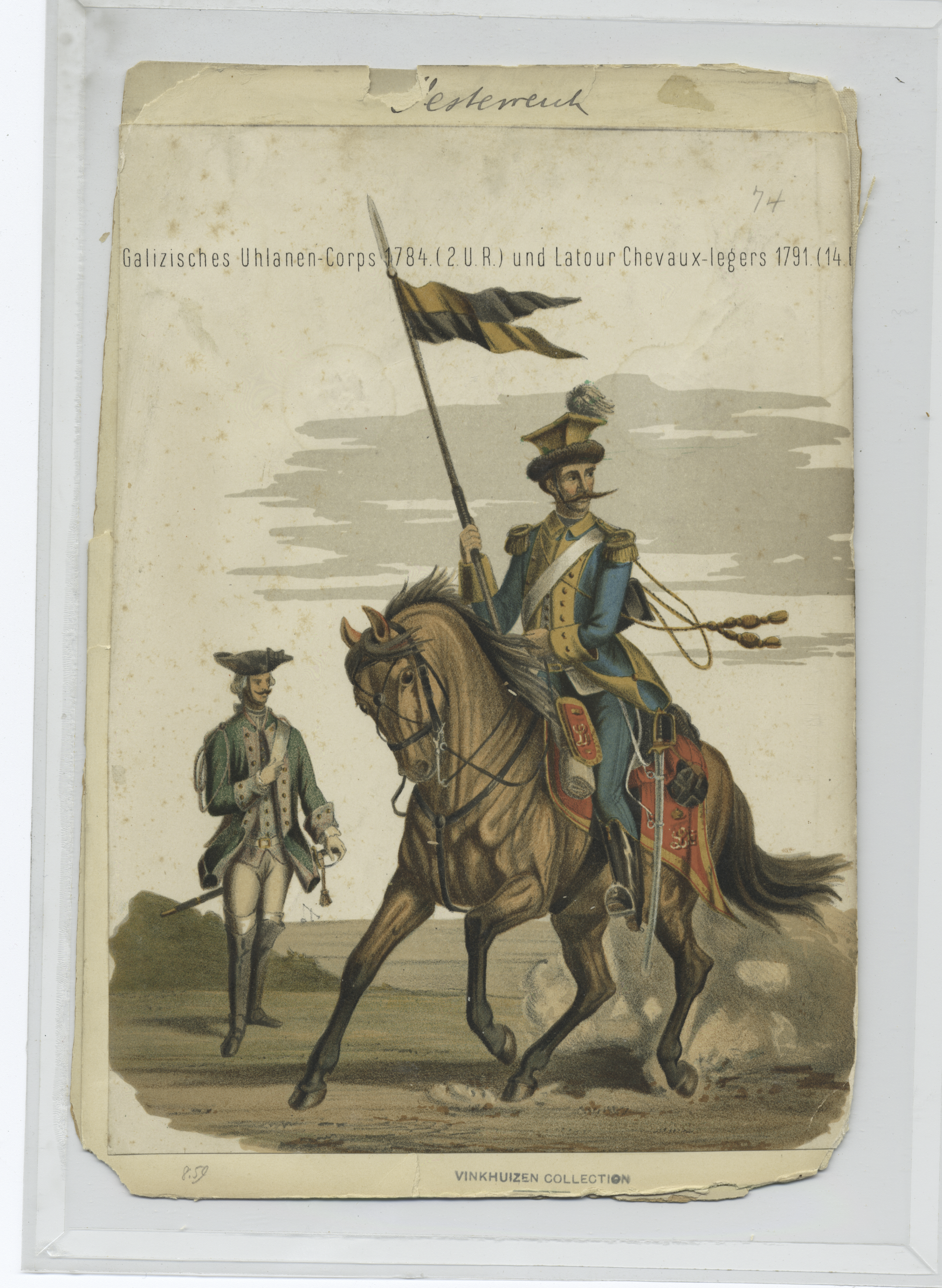
Uhlan from the 2nd Regiment, 1784

Imperial and Royal Uhlan Regiment "Prince of Schwarzenberg" No. 2. was a regiment in the army of the Austro-Hungarian Empire.

The unit was established in 1790 as an “Uhlan Free Corps” (Ulanen-Frei-Korps) for the Imperial Habsburg Army. Over time, it developed within the structure of the Austro-Hungarian land forces’ Common Army into the Imperial and Royal (k.u.k) Uhlan Regiment “Prince zu Schwarzenberg” No. 2.

Until 1798, regiments were named after their proprietor (Inhaber)—who did not necessarily have to be the commanding officer. No standardized spelling or naming convention existed (for example, Regiment Graf Serbelloni or Regiment Serbelloni). Each time the proprietor changed, the regiment concerned also changed its name.

After the reform of the system in 1798, the numbered designation became primary, although it could still be combined with the name of the proprietor.

In 1800, the regiment received the name of Prince Schwarzenberg, which it was to bear “in perpetuity.” Nevertheless, the honorary names of regiments were abolished without replacement in 1915. From then on, the unit was officially designated simply “k.u.k. Uhlan Regiment No. 2.” In practice, however, this change did not fully take hold—partly because the notoriously frugal Austro-Hungarian military administration ordered that all existing letterheads and seals be used up first.

As a distinction for the merits the regiment had earned in earlier campaigns, its officers wore the armor chain (Panzerkettchen) on the czapka made of silver, rather than the gilded metal used by the other Uhlan regiments. The regiment celebrated its feast day on 21 May, on the anniversary of the Battle of Aspern in 1809.
