= Ludwig Koch (painter) =

Austrian artist (1866–1934)

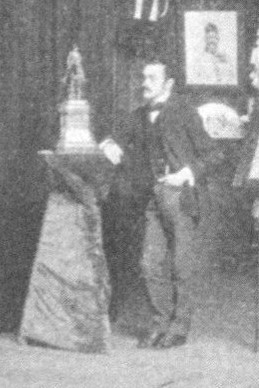
- Koch in his studio, 1903
- Born: 13 December 1866; Vienna
- Died: 26 November 1934 (aged 67); Vienna

Ludwig Koch (December 1866 – 26 November 1934) was an Austrian painter, sculptor and illustrator.

== Life ==
Koch became known mainly as a horse and genre painter. He was a guest at the Spanish Riding School for many years, and recorded many of the school jumps artistically. In addition, he devoted himself to depictions of military history. He studied at the Academy of Fine Arts in Vienna from 1883 to 1891 and was a pupil of Siegmund L'Allemand and August Eisenmenger. Afterwards he was noted for paintings of Austrian military history, he received the special school prize for the painting General Pappenheim in 1889. In 1891, at the Viennese annual exhibition, he displayed the painting Baptism of Fire of the Dragoon Regiment Windisch-Graetz in the Battle of Kolin.

Even before 1914, Koch created portraits and uniforms of the Austro-Hungarian Army, which were often reproduced on postcards. He briefly served in the war as a war painter along the Italian front, but had to retire due to a kidney disease. Even after the collapse of the Austro-Hungarian Empire, Koch dedicated many works to the old army, but also created uniforms for the army of the First Republic.

In addition to military subjects, the main themes of his genre paintings were scenes of the Viennese and of the imperial house (e.g. oil painting Ride of the Archduke - Crown Prince Franz Ferdinand to the Maneuver at the 590th art auction of the Dorotheum Vienna, 1970).

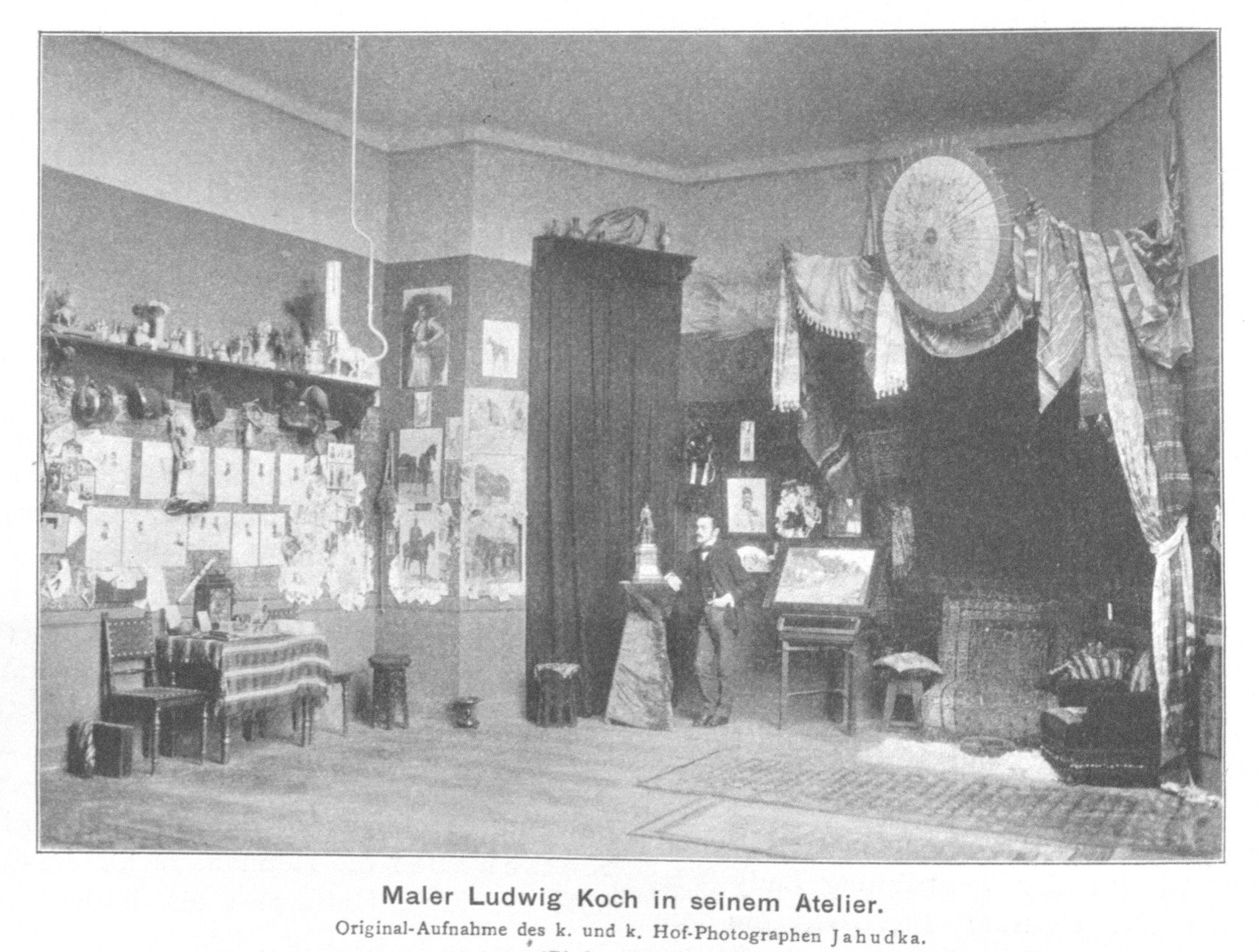
Ludwig Koch in his studio, 1903

Koch published several landscape collections and was an illustrator of many hippological works. One of his most famous works, "The Art of Riding in the Picture" is especially renowned among riders. He was also a member of the so-called Siebener Club, an art association mainly composed of architects (including Josef Hoffmann, Joseph Maria Olbrich and Joseph Urban).

In the 1920s Koch was invited to the United States by the U. S. Polo Association, members of which had heard him spoken of abroad as "the finest painter of horses in the world," to come to the U. S. and make pictures of the International Polo matches. Despite the Association's attempt at promotion, Koch remained relatively unknown and eventually decided to return to Europe.

Ludwig Koch was buried in Vienna at the Hietzing Cemetery in a dedicated grave (group 39, number 241).

== Works (selection) ==
- "Emperor Karl VI in front of Castle Neugebäude" by Ludwig Koch, 1930. Oil on wood, Berlin
- Portrait Friedrich von Beck-Rzikowsky, 1913. Oil on canvas, 90x70 cm, Museum of Military History, Vienna
- Rider Portrait Oberst Maximilian Ritter von Rodakowski at the top of the Trani-Ulanen in the Battle of Custozza on 24 June 1866, 1908. Oil on canvas, 347x244 cm, Museum of Military History, Vienna
- Faded Fanfares, 1932. Oil on canvas, 128x171 cm, Museum of Military History, Vienna
- Oberst Brosch von Aarenau at the top of the Tyrolean Kaiserjäger Nr. 2, 1925. Oil on canvas, 100x70 cm, Museum of Military History, Vienna
- Marching up of the Constitution formed on 1 May 1934 to the Vienna City Hall, Oil on carton, Museum of Military History, Vienna

== Gallery ==
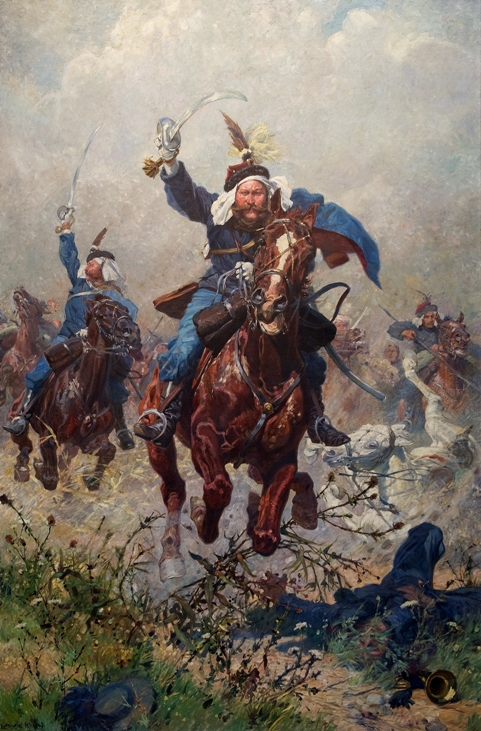
Rodakowski at the Battle of Custozza. (1908. Oil on canvas, Museum of Military History, Vienna)

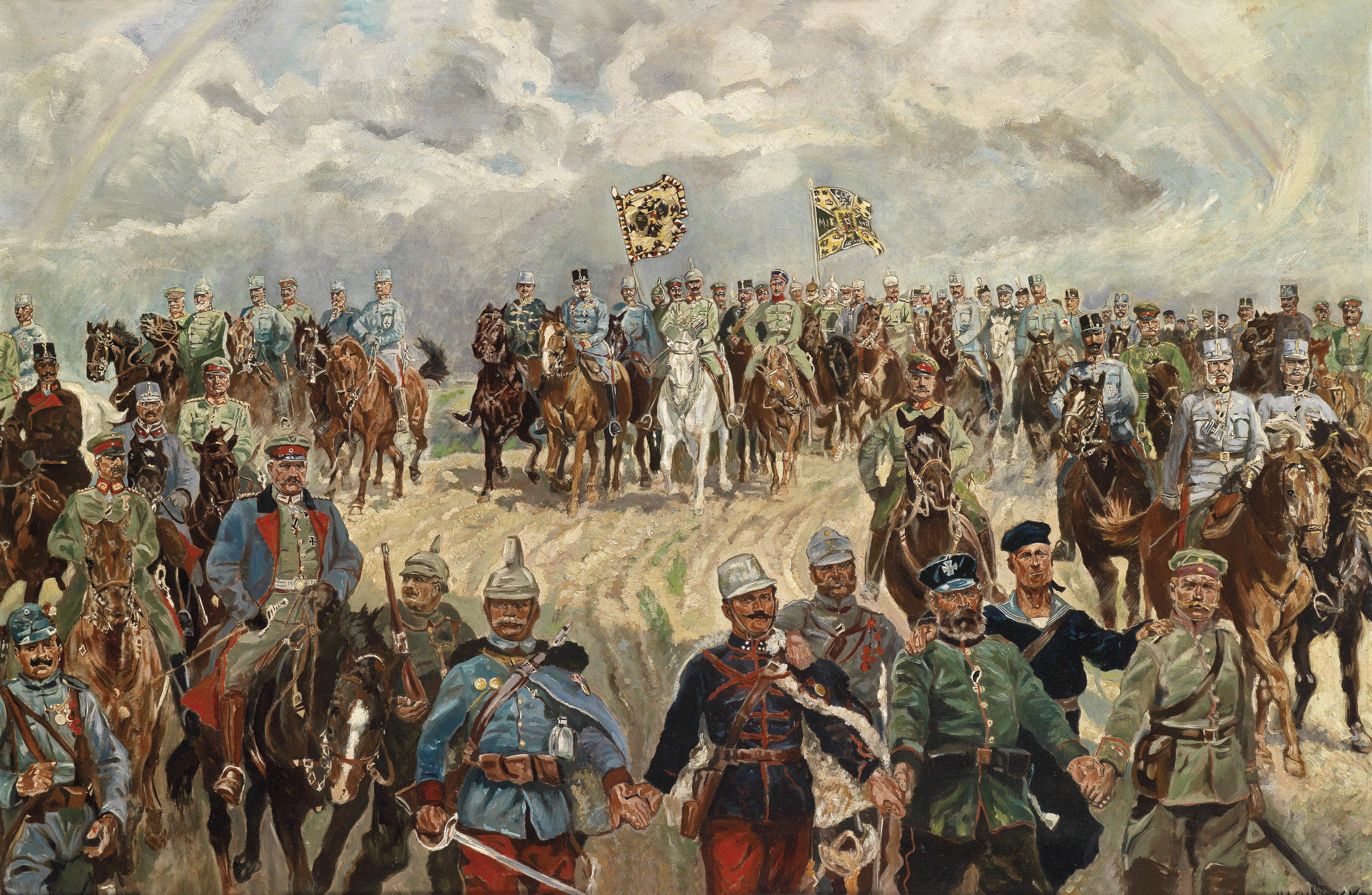
Franz Josef I and Wilhelm II with military commanders during WWI

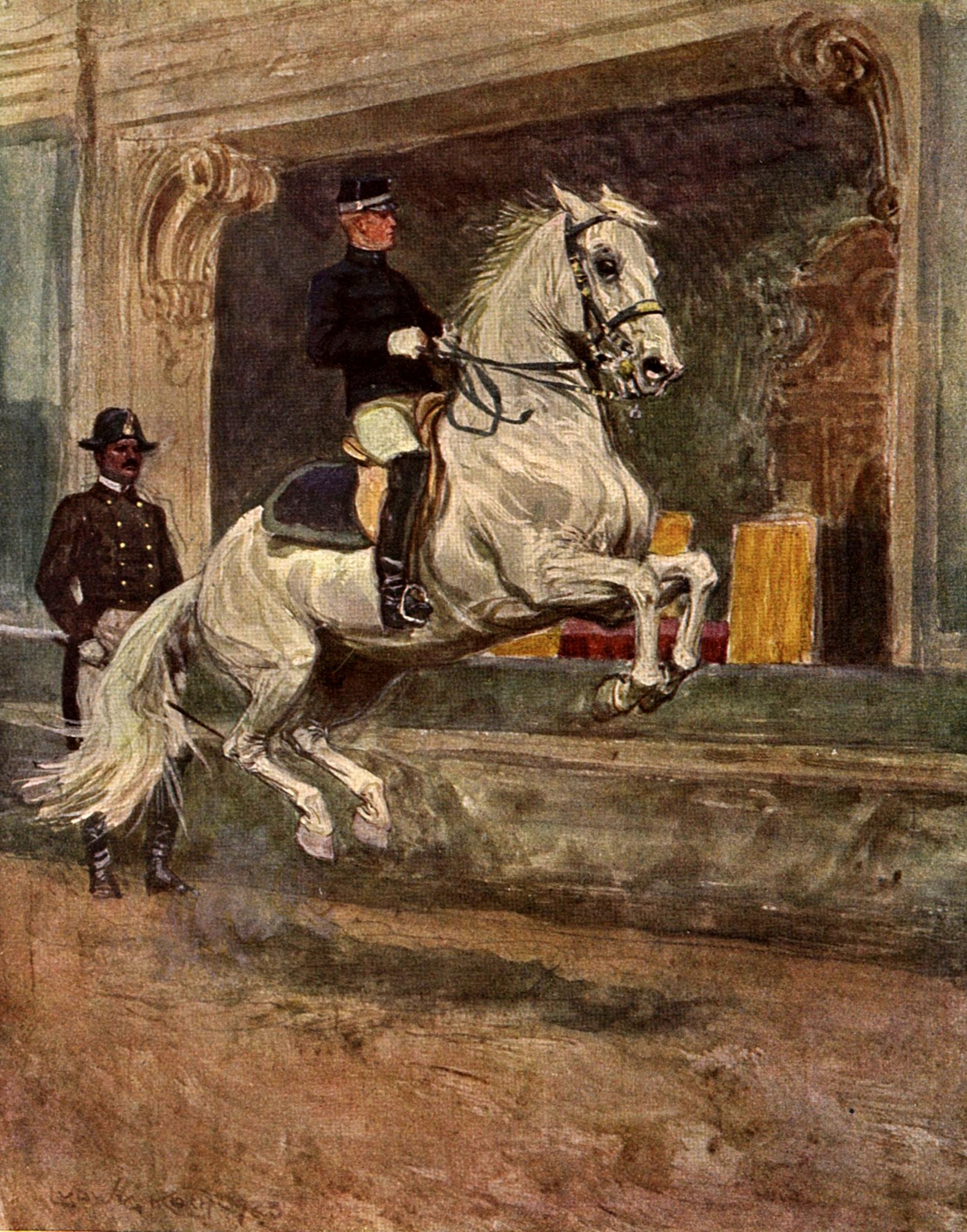
The Croupade from the Art of Riding in the Picture (German: Die Reitkunst im Bilde)
