= Czapka =

Type of cavalry headgear

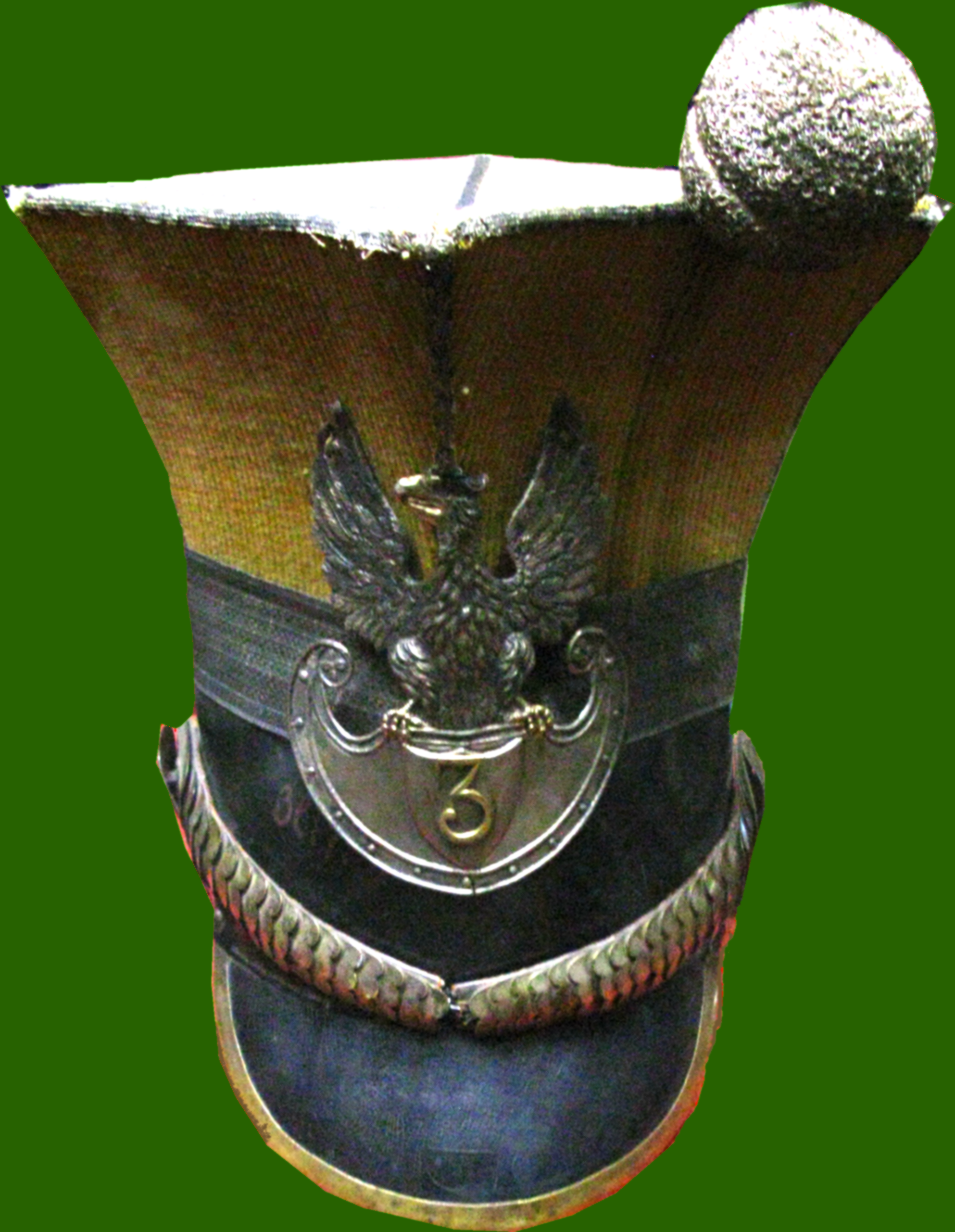
Czapka of the officer of 3rd Uhlan Regiment 1815-1831

Czapka (/ˈtʃæpkə/, Polish pronunciation: [ˈt͡ʂapka]; also spelt chapka or schapska /ˈʃæpskə/) is a Polish, Belarusian, and Russian generic word for a cap. However, it is perhaps best known to English speakers as a word for the 19th-century Polish cavalry headgear, consisting of a high, four-pointed cap with regimental insignia on the front (full name in Polish: czapka rogatywka, initially: konfederatka) to which feathers or rosettes were sometimes added.

== History ==
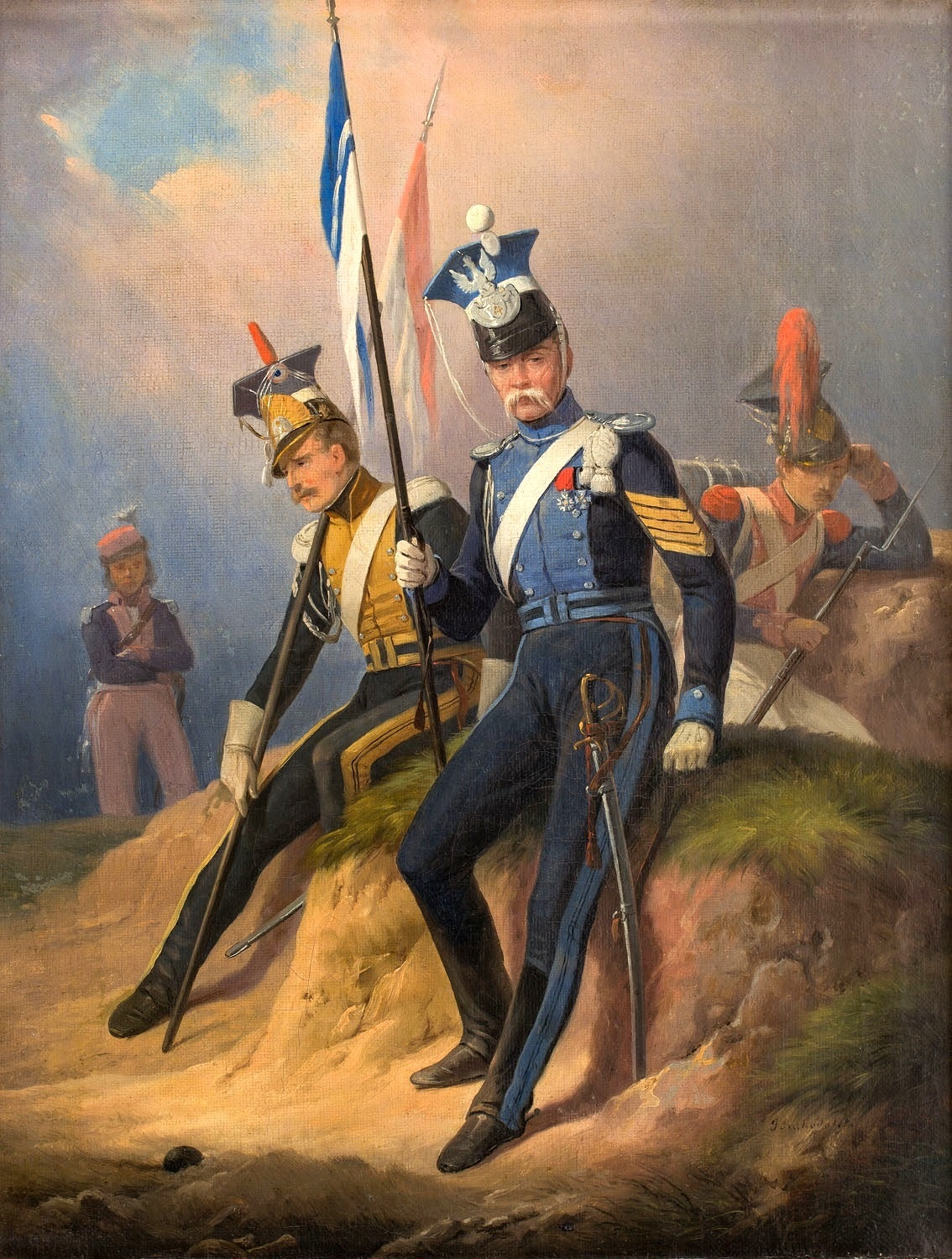
Polish Uhlans wearing czapkas

=== Origins ===
This headdress developed initially as a square-topped variant of a shako. In its early, compact form from 1784 onwards the czapka was introduced by Austrian uhlans, during the time Galicia was under Habsburg rule. Its use was spread from eastern Europe by the Polish Legion, fighting for the French in the Napoleonic Wars, and became popular not only among Napoleon's French and allied forces, such as Westphalia, Bavaria, Saxony, and Naples, but also among the armies of his enemies. The army of the Duchy of Warsaw's infantry and artillery units wore czapkas, but otherwise they were only ever used for uhlan units.

After the Polish lancers proved their effectiveness during the Napoleonic Wars, armies across Europe quickly adopted the concept of the lancer regiments, complete with the czapka as their headdresses.

=== Nineteenth-century usage ===
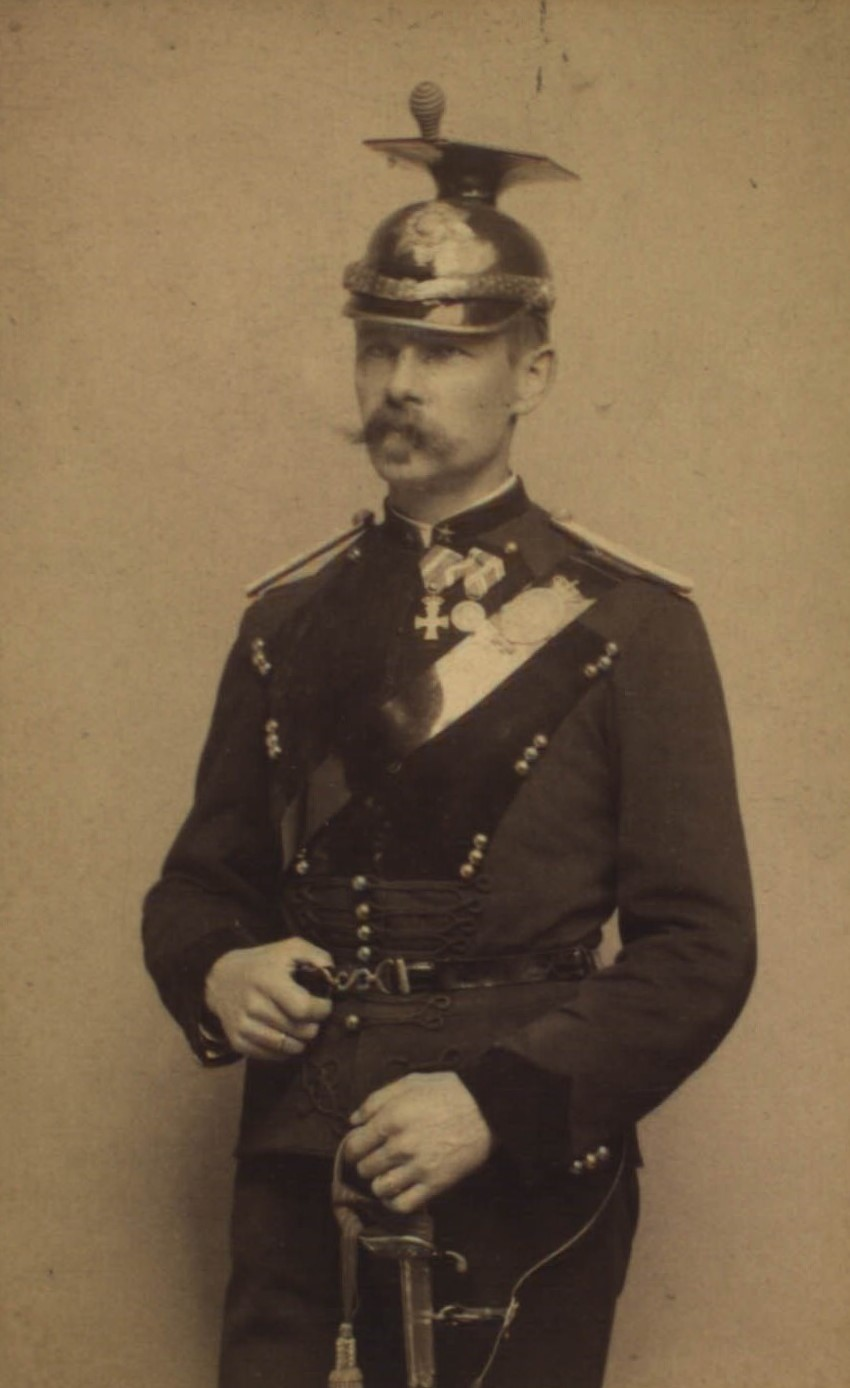
Danish soldier with Czapka

At the end of the Napoleonic Wars the czapka continued to be worn by uhlans in Germany and Austria, as well as in France by Line-Regiment Lancers and later the Imperial Guard of Napoleon III. Lancer regiments in the British Army continued to wear czapkas (described as "lance caps") for full dress until 1939 and the modern Royal Lancers still retains this historic headdress for its Lancer Honour Guard. Along with the traditional double-breasted plastron-fronted lancer jacket, it is also still worn by the band of the Royal Yeomanry.

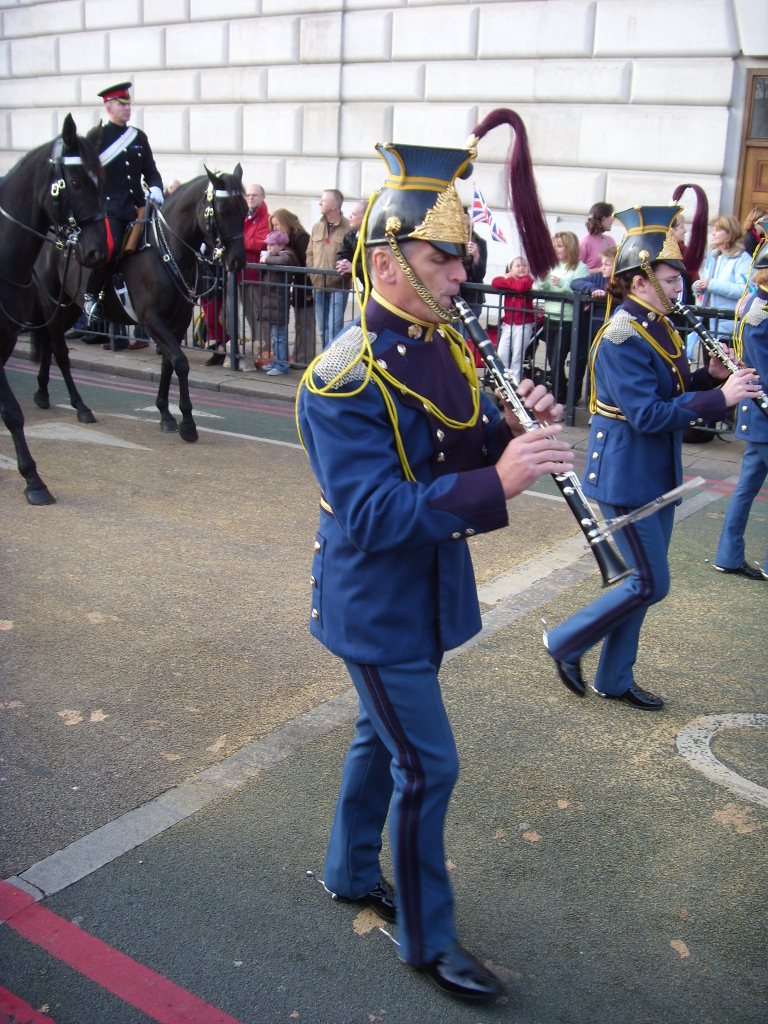
Bandsman of the Royal Yeomanry (British Army Reserve)

With the end of the Second French Empire lancer regiments, and thus the czapka, disappeared from the French Army.

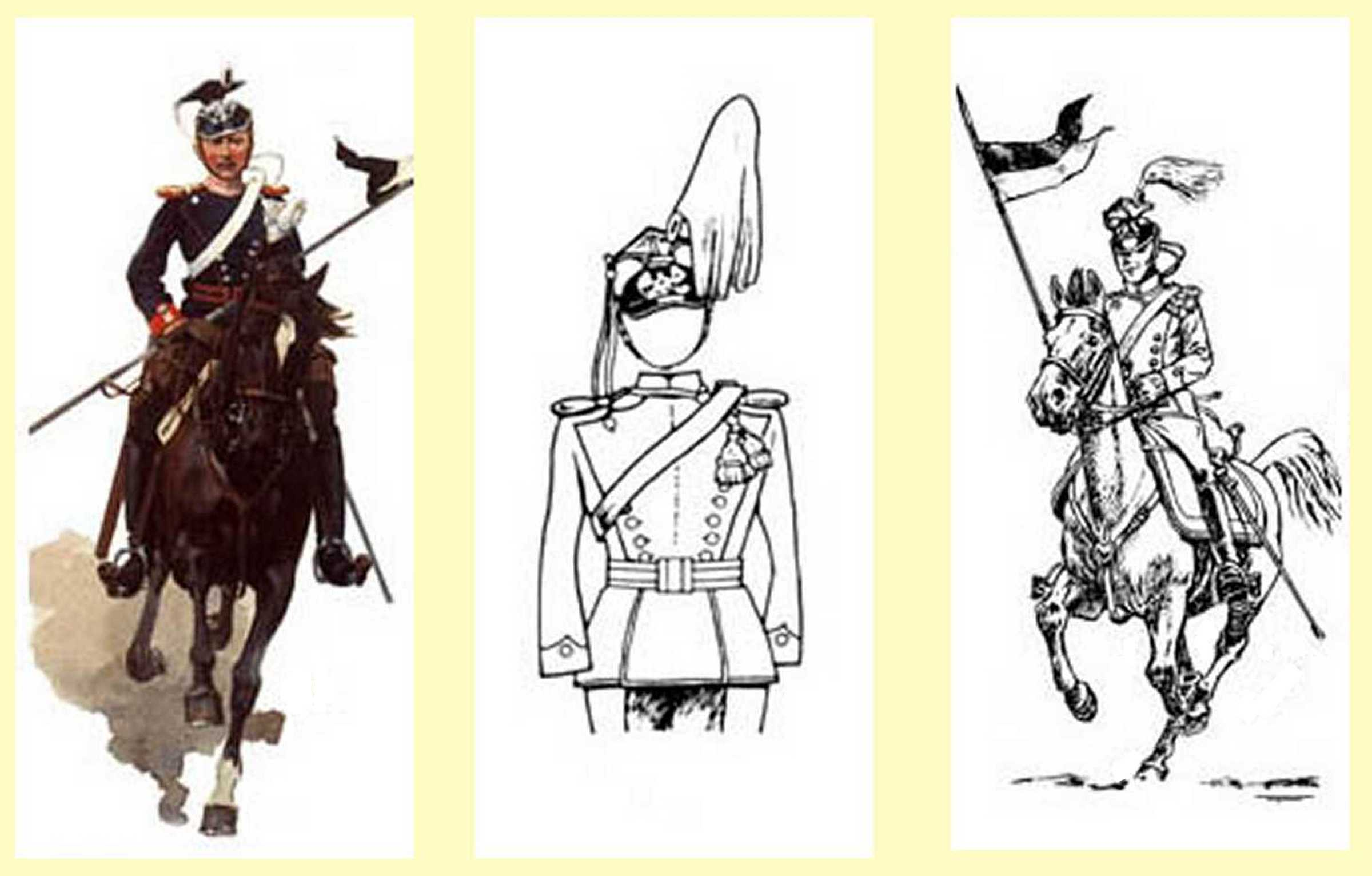
Prussian Uhlans wearing czapkas c1900

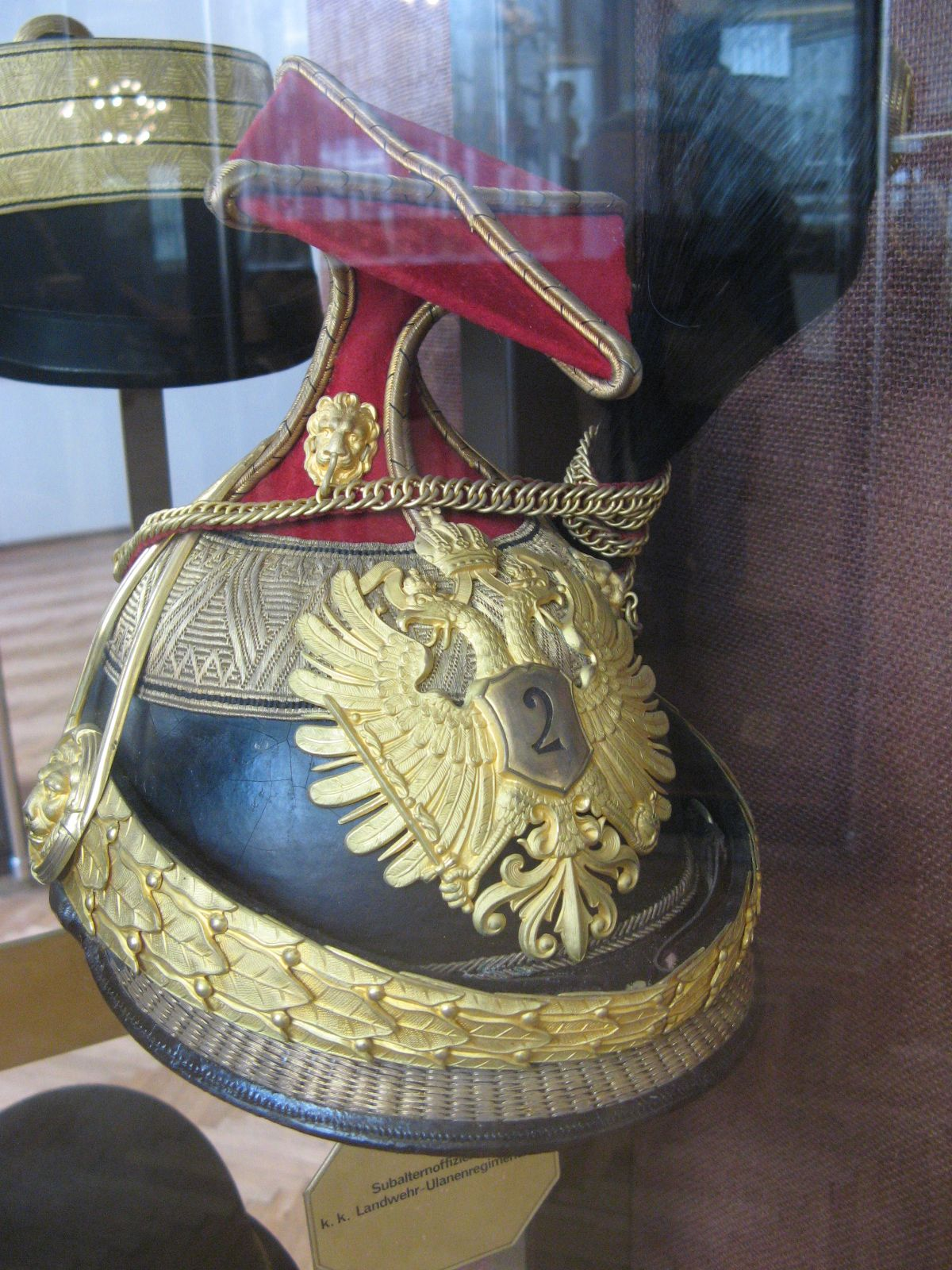
Czapka of a subaltern in the Austro-Hungarian 2nd Uhlan Regiment c1913

The German or Austro-Hungarian czapka ("shapka") consisted of a body of pressed blackened leather, known as the cap and only given a shield on the front. This ended halfway down the back of the head and only protected the front of the head. Instead of a peak, the front was centred on the front point of a four-cornered lid on a stem on top of the helmet. On the left front edge of this lid was attached the National or cockade. There was also a sleeve for the insertion of a brush plume. On the front of the body was a metal emblem (usually an eagle). In German parade examples, a Paraderabatte in the regimental colours was also worn on this type of helmet. In Austro-Hungary they were lined in the regimental colour. A leather chin strap on chains was attached, worn up on the front of the helmet when dismounted. In Austro-Hungary there was also the Kommode-Tschapka, a lighter and more convenient version for field service for officers, without the emblem on the front and with a Wachstuchschicht instead.

The Portuguese cavalry included lancer ("lanceiros") regiments until the overthrow of the Monarchy in 1910, and these retained the czapka in full dress. Spanish lancers wore the "Polish style" headdress from 1833 until after 1868 when a nickel-plated helmet with spike was adopted.

=== World War I ===
In 1914 czapkas were still worn in full dress by all Imperial German, Austro-Hungarian, British, Belgian, and Russian lancer (uhlan) regiments. They varied in detail but all had the characteristic four sided top, resembling the mortar-board of academic dress. Plumes were common on parade and in several of the armies named the different regiments were distinguished by the colour of the top or sides. Belgian, Austro-Hungarian, and German lancers wore their czapkas on active service during the opening weeks of the war, usually with dull coloured or waterproof covers. In the case of the Austro-Hungarian Uhlans, since there were not enough of these coverings, many czapka helmets were summarily painted grey. German and Austro-Hungarian uhlans wore the czapka during the First World War, though it ceased to be worn for field uniform after the adoption of the "Stahlhelm" steel helmet in 1916.

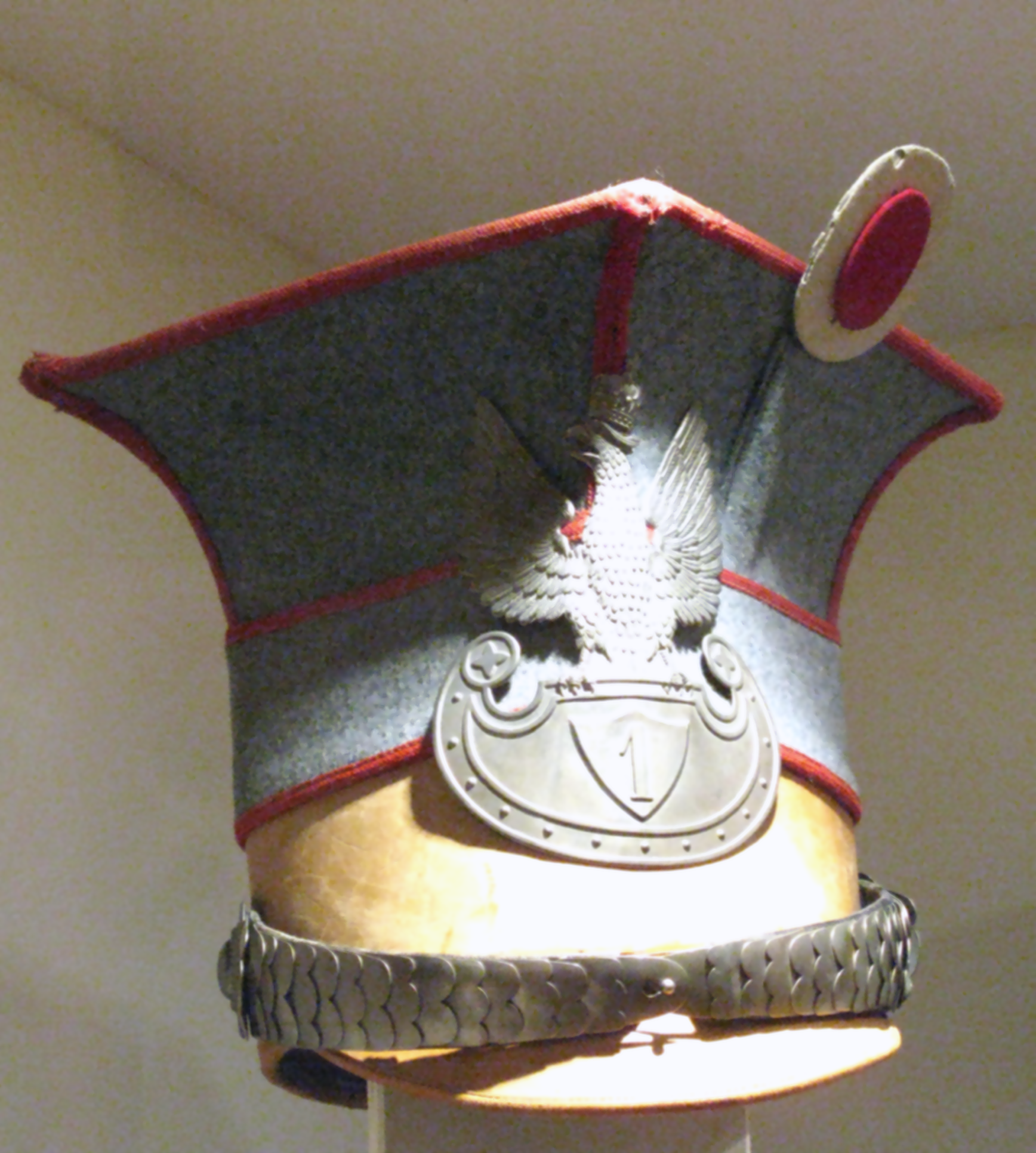
Czapka of a wachtmeister of 1st Uhlan Regiment of Polish Legions

=== Polish usage to present day ===
During the twentieth century the czapka became one of the symbols of Polish national independence. After World War I, the new Polish Army adopted a four-pointed form as its standard issue national headdress in the form of a rogatywka. After 1952 this czapka style hat was replaced by a round peaked cap of Soviet style, apart from soft field caps, which retained rogatywka style.

In 1982 the rogatywka re-appeared as the headdress of the ceremonial honour guard protecting Belvedere Palace.

Officers of the modern Polish Army wear the four sided cap in certain orders of dress, although berets are the normal headdress.

== See also ==
- Rogatywka
