= Kingdom of Galicia and Lodomeria =

Constituent kingdom of the Habsburg Monarchy (1772–1918)

Coordinates: 50.0°N 23.2°E

Kingdom of Galicia and Lodomeria, with the Grand Duchy of Kraków and the Duchies of Auschwitz and Zator Name in different languages ↓
- 1772–1918
- Flag (1890–1918) Coat of arms

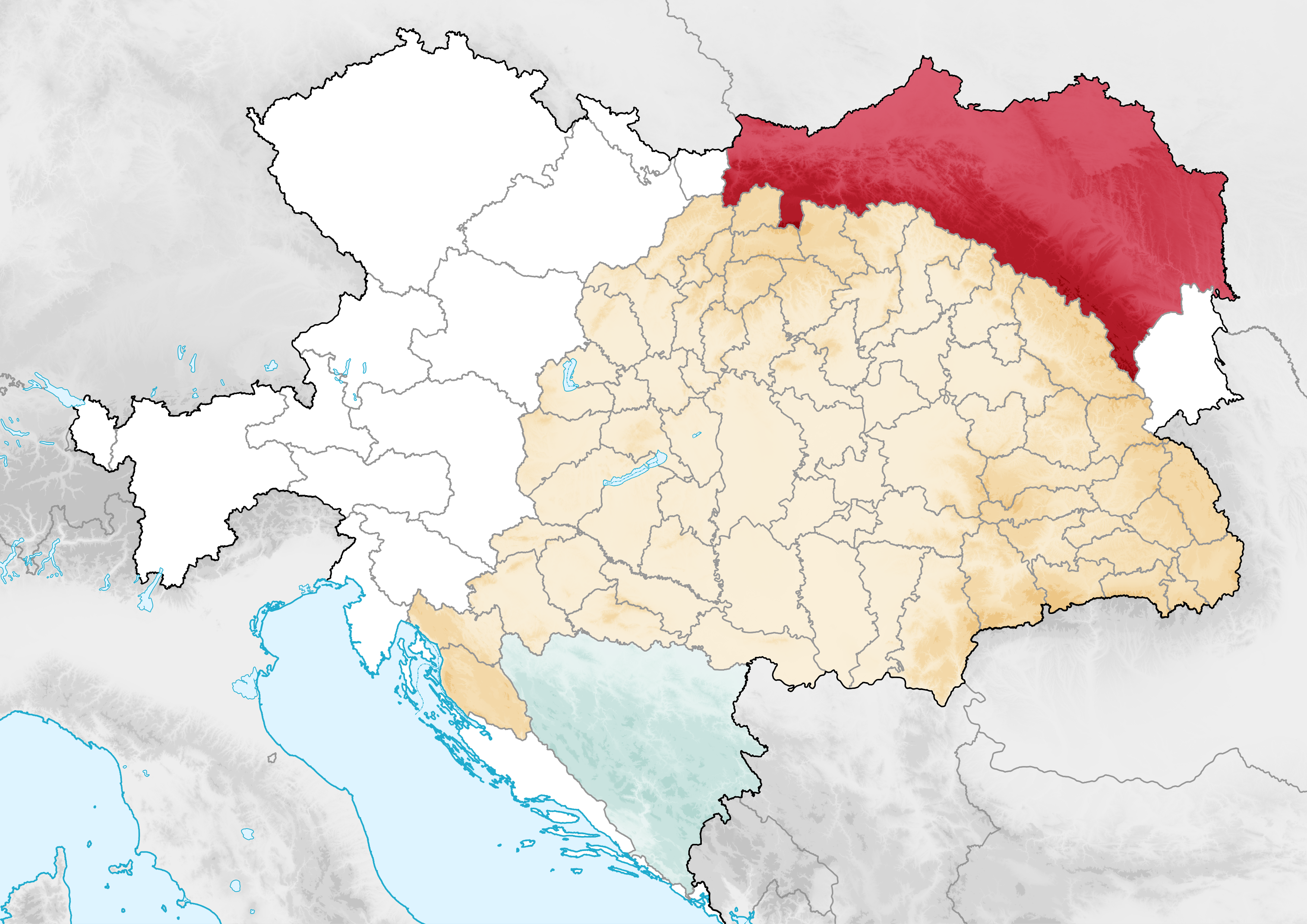
- Galicia and Lodomeria (red) within Austria-Hungary in 1914
- Status: Crown land of the Habsburg monarchy (1772–1804); Crown land of the Austrian Empire (1804–1867); Crown land of the Cisleithanian part of the dual monarchy of Austria-Hungary (1867–1918)
- Capital: Lemberg (Lviv)
- Official languages: German
- Common languages: 1910 census: Polish 58.6%; Ruthenian 40.2%
- Religion: Latin Catholic; Greek Catholic; Minority: Jewish; Protestant; Armenian; Eastern Orthodox
- Government: Absolute monarchy (1772–1860); Parliamentary constitutional monarchy (1860–1918)
- Monarch
  - 1772–1780 (first): Maria Theresa
  - 1916–1918 (last): Charles I
- Governor
  - 1772–1774 (first): J. A. von Pergen
  - 1917–1918 (last): Karl Georg Huyn
- Legislature: Diet
- History
  - First Partition of Poland: 5 August 1772
  - Claimed by West UPR: 19 October 1918
  - Joined to Poland: 14 November 1918
  - Treaty of Saint-Germain-en-Laye: 10 September 1919

Area
  - Total: 78,497 km^{2} (30,308 sq mi)

Population
  - 1910: 8,025,675
- Currency: Florin (1772–1892); Krone (1892–1918)
Preceded by
Polish–Lithuanian Commonwealth
Principality of Moldavia
Duchy of Warsaw
Free City of Cracow
Succeeded by
Second Polish Republic
West Ukrainian People's Republic
Republic of Tarnobrzeg
Duchy of Bukovina
General Government of Galicia and Bukovina
Grand Duchy of Warsaw
- Today part of: Poland; Ukraine

The Kingdom of Galicia and Lodomeria, (Note: German: Königreich Galizien und Lodomerien [ˈkøːnɪkˌʁaɪç ɡaˈliːtsi̯ən ʔʊnt lodoˈmeːʁi̯ən]; Polish: Królestwo Galicji i Lodomerii [kruˈlɛstfɔ ɡaˈlit͡sji i lɔdɔˈmɛrji]; Ukrainian: Королівство Галичини та Володимирії, romanized: Korolivstvo Halychyny ta Volodymyrii) also known as Austrian Galicia or colloquially Austrian Poland, was a constituent possession of the Habsburg monarchy, encompassing the historical region of Galicia, and also including parts of historical regions of Lodomeria and Lesser Poland. The crown land was established in 1772, after the First Partition of Poland, when Habsburgs annexed those regions, previously belonging to the Polish-Lithuanian Commonwealth. In 1804, it became a crown land of the newly proclaimed Austrian Empire. From 1867, it was a crown land within the Cisleithanian or Austrian half of the dual monarchy of Austria-Hungary. It maintained a degree of provincial autonomy, and its status remained unchanged until the dissolution of the monarchy in 1918.

The domain was initially carved in 1772 from the southwestern part of the Polish–Lithuanian Commonwealth. During the following period, several territorial changes occurred. In 1795, the Habsburg monarchy participated in the Third Partition of Poland and annexed additional Polish-held territory, which was renamed as West Galicia. That region was lost in 1809. Some other changes also occurred, by territorial expansion or contraction (1786, 1803, 1809, 1815, 1846, 1849). After 1849, the borders of the crown land remained stable until 1918.

During the World War I, it was temporarily occupied and governed within the General Governorate of Galicia and Bukovina (1914–1915). In 1918, after the dissolution of Austria-Hungary, its eastern regions were claimed by the Ukrainian People's Republic, and also by the West Ukrainian People's Republic, but following the Polish–Ukrainian War the entire region became part of the Second Polish Republic. As a result of later border changes following World War II, the region of Galicia became divided between the Republic of Poland and the Ukrainian SSR of the Soviet Union, now Poland and Ukraine.

The nucleus of historical Galicia broadly corresponds to the modern Lviv, Ternopil, and Ivano-Frankivsk regions of western Ukraine; while the western part makes up the bulk of the Polish Lesser Poland and Subcarpathian Voivodeships and a large part of the Silesian Voivodeship.

== Name ==
The name of the newly created realm, selected by the Habsburgs in 1772, stems from a title used since the 13th century by Kings of Hungary, who had a long-standing claim over both Galicia and Lodomeria. The term "Galicia" is a Latinized form of Halychyna, a historical region and a medieval Ukrainian principality centered in the city of Halych. The name "Lodomeria" is also a Latinized form of the original Ukrainian name of the principality centered in Volodymyr-Volynskyi, and also known as Volhynia. The royal title "King of Galicia and Lodomeria" was created by King Andrew II of Hungary (1205–1235) during his temporary conquests of the region. Since that time, the dual title was included among ceremonial titles used by the kings of Hungary, thus creating the basis for later (1772) Habsburg claims.

Galicia was the largest part of the area annexed by the Habsburg monarchy in the First Partition of Poland in 1772, with the addition of a minor part of historical Lodomeria (the Belz region belonged to medieval Volhynia/Lodomeria). As such, the newly annexed territory was named the "Kingdom of Galicia and Lodomeria" to underline the Habsburg claim to those regions, as lands of the Hungarian Crown. Already in 1772, the annexed territory included a significant (southern) part of Lesser Poland, but that region was not represented in the name of the realm, for various political reasons.

In the Third Partition of Poland (1795), additional portions of the abolished Kingdom of Poland (northern and eastern parts of the historical Lesser Poland, and the most western part of historical Lodomeria) were also annexed by the Habsburgs, and renamed as West Galicia (or New Galicia), which additionally expanded the geographical reference of the term Galicia, thus omitting again Polish designations from the official geopolitical terminology.

=== Ceremonial name ===
After the annexation of the Grand Duchy of Kraków in 1846, the name of the realm, in its wider ceremonial form, was: Kingdom of Galicia and Lodomeria with the Grand Duchy of Kraków and the Duchies of Auschwitz and Zator. It had equivalents in all languages spoken in the region, including: German: Königreich Galizien und Lodomerien mit dem Großherzogtum Krakau und den Herzogtümern Auschwitz und Zator; Polish: Królestwo Galicji i Lodomerii wraz z Wielkim Księstwem Krakowskim i Księstwami Oświęcimia i Zatoru.

== History ==
Galician borders overlaid with modern state borders

In 1772, by the First Partition of Poland, the Habsburg Monarchy acquired Galicia, with parts of Lodomeria and Lesser Poland. Until then, those regions were parts of the Polish Kingdom: the Lesser Poland since the early medieval times, and Galicia-Lodomeria since the Galicia–Volhynia Wars in the 14th century, when they were annexed, and remained under Polish rule until the First Partition. The first governor, Count Johann Anton von Pergen, took his post in the autumn of 1772.

Lwów (Lemberg in German) served as the capital of Austrian Galicia, which was dominated by the Polish aristocracy, despite the fact that the population of the eastern half of the province was mostly Ukrainians. In addition, there existed a large Jewish population in Galicia, also more heavily concentrated in the eastern parts of the province.

During the first decades of Austrian rule, Galicia was firmly governed from Vienna, and many significant reforms were carried out by a bureaucracy staffed largely by Germans and Czechs. The aristocracy was guaranteed its rights, but these rights were considerably circumscribed. The former serfs were no longer mere chattels but became subjects of law and were granted certain personal freedoms, such as the right to marry without the lord's permission. Their labour obligations were defined and limited, and they could bypass the lords and appeal to the imperial courts for justice.

The eastern-rite Uniate Church, which primarily served the Ruthenians, was renamed the Greek Catholic Church to bring it on a par with the Roman Catholic Church; it was given seminaries, and eventually, a Metropolitan. Although unpopular with the aristocracy, among the common folk, Polish and Ukrainian/Ruthenian alike, these reforms created a reservoir of good will toward the emperor which lasted almost to the end of Austrian rule. At the same time, however, the Austrian Empire extracted from Galicia considerable wealth and conscripted large numbers of the peasant population into its armed services.

Chronology of political history (1772–1914)
- 1772: First Partition of Poland – Kingdom of Galicia and Lodomeria established.
- 1782: Galicia divided into 18 Kreise (see § Administrative divisions).
- 1786: Bukovina District (Bukowiner Kreis) added to Galicia.
- 1795: Third Partition of Poland – substantial territories around Lublin, including Kraków, annexed to West Galicia.
- 1803: West Galicia merged into Galicia-proper (as a separate gubernium, including three western first-partition Kreise: Myślenice, Sandec and Bochnia).
- 1809: Treaty of Schönbrunn – Third partition gains, the Zamośćer Kreis, the right bank of the San and an area on the right bank of the Vistula across from Kraków ceded to the Duchy of Warsaw. Ternopil ceded to the Russian Empire (Tarnopolsky Krai).
- 1815: Final Act of the Congress of Vienna. The Free City of Kraków was established; the remainder of the Austrian third partition and Zamość were transferred to Russian Congress Poland. Ternopil and the right banks of the San and Vistula returned to Austrian Galicia.
- 1817: Estates of Galicia created by Austria.
- 1846: Peasants' rising. Kraków annexed to Galicia (nominally as the Grand Duchy of Kraków, de facto as the Krakauer Kreis).
- 1848: Revolution in Vienna. Formation of the first Polish National Committees in Galicia. First, open demands for constitutional rights. On 2 May, the Supreme Ruthenian (Ukrainian) Council was established.
- 1849: Bukovina detached from Galicia as the Duchy of Bukovina.
- 1850: Kreise replaced with political districts; Galicia divided into three Regierungsbezirke ('government districts'): Lemberg, Krakau and Stanislau.
- 1854: Kreise re-established; divided between Verwaltungsgebiet Lemberg and Verwaltungsgebiet Krakau.
- 1859: Austria defeated at Magenta and Solferino.
- 1860: October Constitution with promise of autonomy. Bukovina re-attached to Galicia. Verwaltungsgebiet Krakau abolished. Number of Kreise reduced.
- 1861: February Constitution adopted. First Galician Diet. Bukovina was separated from Galicia again.
- 1866: Austro-Prussian War.
- 1867: Dual Monarchy established; Galicia becomes part of Cisleithania.
- 1868: Kreise abolished; political districts established (see § Administrative divisions).
- 1868: "Galician Resolution" submitted to the Emperor. Administration begins to pass into Polish hands.
- 1873: Introduction of direct voting for Reichsrat elections.
- 1896: Extension of suffrage.
- 1907: Universal suffrage introduced.
- 1914: Enlargement and reorganisation of the Diet.

=== From 1809 to 1860 ===
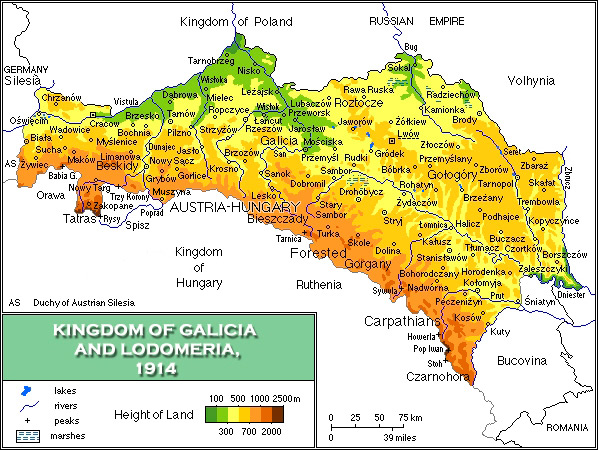
Physical map of the Kingdom of Galicia and Lodomeria, 1861–1918

In 1809, during the Napoleonic Wars, Austria was forced in the Treaty of Schönbrunn to cede all of its third partition gains, plus Zamość and some other areas, to the Napoleonic Duchy of Warsaw, and some eastern areas around Ternopol to the Russian Empire. (For details, see § Administrative divisions.) In 1815, after the Napoleonic Wars, the Congress of Vienna returned Ternopil and a few other territories to Austria, but assigned the bulk of the formerly-Austrian territory of West Galicia to Congress Poland (Kingdom of Poland), which was ruled by the tsar. The city of Kraków and the surrounding territory, formerly also part of New or West Galicia, became the semi-autonomous Free City of Kraków under the supervision of the three powers that ruled Poland (i.e. Austria, Russia, and Prussia).

The 1820s and 1830s were periods of bureaucratic rule that was overseen by Vienna. Most administrative positions were filled by German speakers, including German-speaking Czechs. After the failure of the November Uprising in Russian Poland in 1830–1831, in which a few thousand Galician volunteers participated, many Polish refugees arrived in Galicia. The late 1830s period was rife with Polish conspiratorial organizations whose work culminated in the unsuccessful Galician insurrection of 1846. This uprising was easily put down by the Austrians with the help of a Galician peasantry that remained loyal to the emperor. The uprising occurred in the Polish-populated part of Galicia. Polish manorial gentry supported or were sympathetic to plans for an uprising to establish an independent Polish state, but peasants on the manorial estates of western Galicia, reduced to misery by poor harvests, saw little advantage for themselves in a free Poland. Instead, they seized the opportunity to rise against the institution of serfdom by killing many of the estate owners. With the collapse of the uprising for a free Poland, the city of Kraków lost its semi-autonomy and was integrated into the Austrian Empire under the title of a grand duchy. In practice, it was administered by the Austrian authorities as if it were part of Galicia.

In the same period, a sense of national awakening began to develop among the Ruthenians in the eastern part of Galicia. A circle of activists, primarily Greek Catholic seminarians, affected by the romantic movement in Europe and the example of fellow Slavs elsewhere, especially in eastern Ukraine under the Russians, began to turn their attention to the common folk and their language. In 1837, the so-called Ruthenian Triad led by Markiian Shashkevych, published Rusalka Dnistrovaia (The Nymph of the Dniester), a collection of folksongs and other materials in vernacular Ukrainian (then called rusynska, Ruthenian). Alarmed by such democratism, the Austrian authorities and the Greek Catholic Metropolitan banned the book.

In 1848, revolutionary actions broke out in Vienna and other parts of the Austrian Empire. In Lemberg, a Polish National Council, and then later, a Ukrainian, or Supreme Ruthenian Council were formed. Even before Vienna had acted, the remnants of serfdom were abolished by the Governor, Franz Stadion, in an attempt to thwart the revolutionaries. Moreover, Polish demands for Galician autonomy were countered by Ruthenian demands for national equality and for a partition of the province into an Eastern, Ruthenian part, and a Western, Polish part. Eventually, Lemberg was bombarded by imperial troops and the revolution was put down completely.

A decade of renewed absolutism followed, but to placate the Poles, Count Agenor Gołuchowski, a conservative representative of the eastern Galician aristocracy, the so-called Podolians, was appointed viceroy. He began to Polonize the local administration and managed to have Ruthenian ideas of partitioning the province shelved. He was unsuccessful, however, in forcing the Greek Catholic Church to shift to the use of the western or Gregorian calendar, or among Ruthenians generally, to replace the Cyrillic alphabet with the Latin alphabet.

=== Constitutional experiments ===
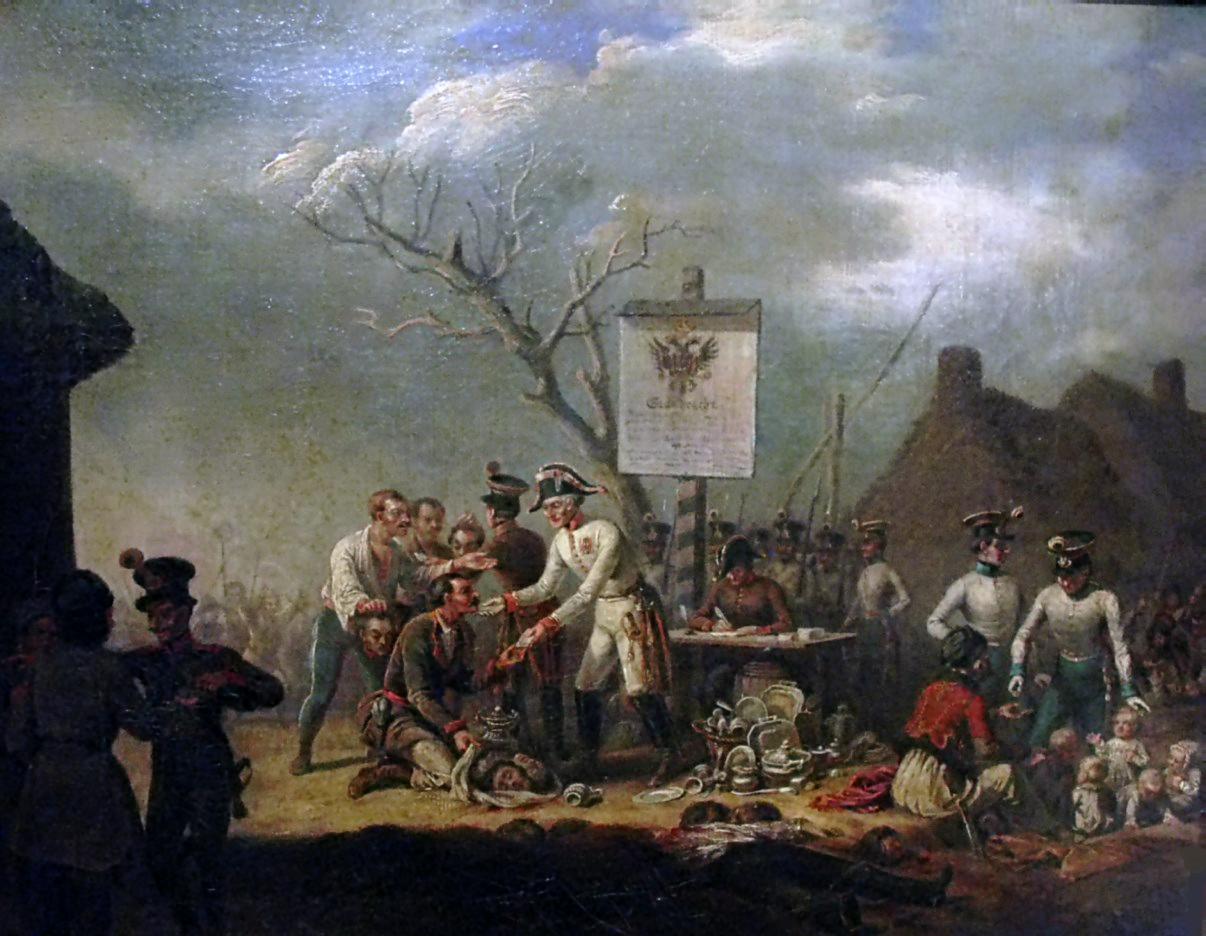
Galician slaughter (Polish "Rzeź galicyjska") by Jan Lewicki (1795–1871)

In 1859, following the Austro-Hungarian military defeat in Italy, the Empire entered a period of constitutional experiments. In 1860, the Vienna Government, influenced by Agenor Gołuchowski, issued its October Diploma, which envisioned a conservative federalization of the empire, but a negative reaction in the German-speaking lands led to changes in government and the issuing of the February Patent, which watered down this decentralization. Nevertheless, by 1861, Galicia was granted a legislative assembly, the Diet of Galicia and Lodomeria (Sejm in Polish). Although at first pro-Habsburg Ukrainian and Polish peasant representation was considerable in this body (about half the assembly), and the pressing social and Ukrainian questions were discussed, administrative pressures limited the effectiveness of both peasant and Ukrainian representatives and the diet became dominated by the Polish aristocracy and gentry, who favoured further autonomy. This same year, disturbances broke out in Russian Poland and, to some extent, spilled over into Galicia. The diet ceased to sit.

By 1863, an open revolt broke out in Russian Poland and from 1864 to 1865, the Austro-Hungarian government declared a state of siege in Galicia, temporarily suspending civil liberties. The year 1865 brought a return to federal ideas along the lines suggested by Gołuchowski and negotiations on autonomy between the Polish aristocracy and Vienna began once again.

Meanwhile, the Ruthenians felt more and more abandoned by Vienna and among the Old Ruthenians grouped around the Greek Catholic Cathedral of Saint George, there occurred a turn towards Russia. The more extreme supporters of this orientation came to be known as Russophiles. At the same time, influenced by the Ukrainian language poetry of the central Ukrainian writer, Taras Shevchenko, an opposing Ukrainophile movement arose which published literature in the Ukrainian/Ruthenian language and eventually established a network of reading halls. Supporters of this orientation came to be known as Populists, and later, as Ukrainians. Almost all Ruthenians, however, still hoped for national equality and for an administrative division of Galicia along ethnic lines.

=== Galician autonomy ===
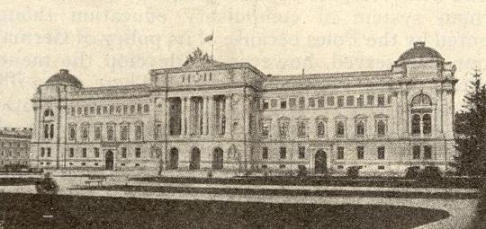
The Galician Sejm (parliament) in Lviv

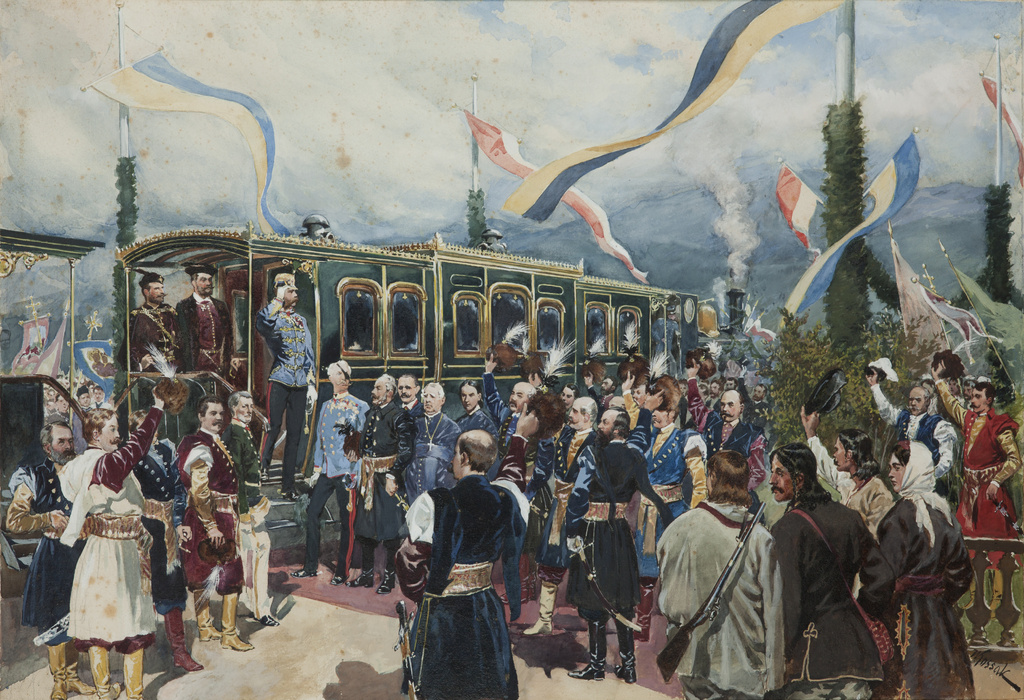
Visit of Emperor Franz Joseph I of Austria to Galicia in 1880

In 1866, following the Battle of Königgrätz and the Austrian defeat in the Austro-Prussian War, the Austrian Empire began to experience increased internal problems. In an effort to shore up support for the monarchy, Emperor Franz Joseph began negotiations for a compromise with the Hungarian nobility to ensure their support. Some members of the government, such as the Austro-Hungarian prime minister Count Richard von Belcredi, advised the Emperor to make a more comprehensive constitutional deal with all of the nationalities that would have created a federal structure. Belcredi worried that an accommodation with the Magyar interests would alienate the other nationalities. However, Franz Joseph was unable to ignore the power of the Magyar nobility, and they would not accept anything less than dualism between themselves and the traditional Austrian elites.

Finally, after the so-called Ausgleich of February 1867, the Austrian Empire was reformed into a dualist Austria-Hungary. Although the Polish and Czech plans for their parts of the monarchy to be included in the federal structure failed, a slow yet steady process of liberalisation of Austrian rule in Galicia started. Representatives of the Polish aristocracy and intelligentsia addressed the Emperor asking for greater autonomy for Galicia. Their demands were not accepted outright, but over the course of the next several years, a number of significant concessions were made toward the establishment of Galician autonomy.

From 1873, Galicia was de facto an autonomous province of Austria-Hungary with Polish and, to a lesser degree, Ukrainian or Ruthenian, as official languages. The Germanisation had been halted and the censorship lifted as well. Galicia was subject to the Cisleithanian jurisdiction of the Dual Monarchy, but the Galician Sejm and provincial administration had extensive privileges and prerogatives, especially in education, culture, and local affairs.

These changes were supported by many Polish intellectuals. In 1869, a group of young conservative publicists in Kraków, including Józef Szujski, Stanisław Tarnowski, Stanisław Egbert Koźmian and Ludwik Wodzicki, published a series of satirical pamphlets entitled Teka Stańczyka (Stańczyk's Portfolio). Only five years after the tragic end of the January Uprising, the pamphlets ridiculed the idea of armed national uprisings and suggested compromise with Poland's enemies, especially the Austrian Empire, concentration on economic growth, and acceptance of the political concessions offered by Vienna. This political grouping came to be known as the Stanczyks or Kraków Conservatives. Together with the eastern Galician conservative Polish landowners and aristocracy, called the "Podolians", they gained a political ascendancy in Galicia which lasted until 1914. This shift in power from Vienna to the Polish landowning class was not welcomed by the Ruthenians, who became more sharply divided between Ukrainophiles, who looked to Kyiv and the common people for historic connection, and Russophiles who stressed their connections to Russia.

Both Vienna and the Poles saw treason among the Russophiles and a series of political trials eventually discredited them. Meanwhile, by 1890, an agreement was worked out between the Poles and the "Populist" Ruthenians or Ukrainians which saw the partial Ukrainianization of the school system in eastern Galicia and other concessions to Ukrainian culture. Possibly as a result of this agreement, Ukrainian language students rose sharply in number. Thereafter, the Ukrainian national movement spread rapidly among the Ruthenian peasantry and, despite repeated setbacks, by the early years of the twentieth century this movement had almost completely replaced other Ruthenian groups as the main rival for power with the Poles. Throughout this period, the Ukrainians never gave up the traditional Ruthenian demands for national equality and for partition of the province into a western, Polish half and an eastern, Ukrainian half. Starting with the election of September 1895, Galicia became known for its "bloody elections" as the Austrian prime minister Count Kasimir Felix Badeni proceeded to rig the election results while having policemen beat those voters who were not voting for the government at the poll stations.

=== First World War and Polish-Ukrainian conflict ===
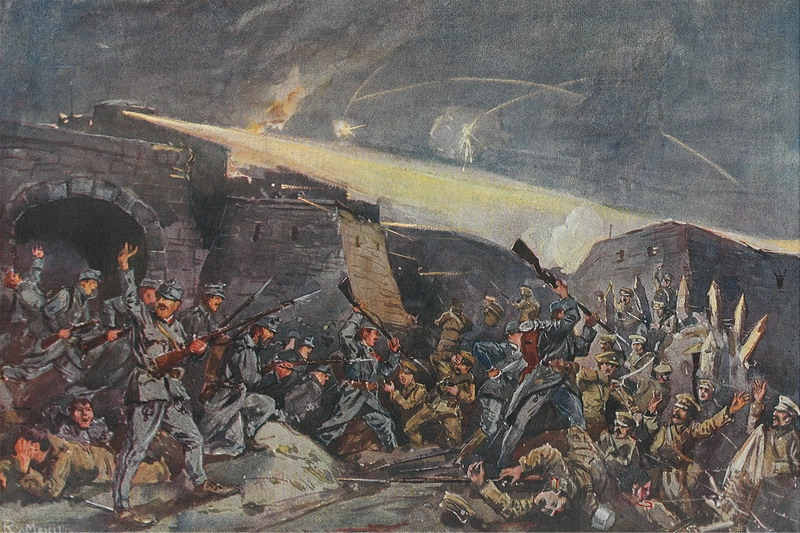
The Siege of Przemyśl in 1915

During the World War I, Galicia saw heavy fighting between the forces of Russia and the Central Powers. The Imperial Russian Army overran most of the region in 1914 after defeating the Austro-Hungarian Army in a chaotic frontier battle in the opening months of the war. They were, in turn, pushed out in the spring and summer of 1915 by a combined German and Austro-Hungarian offensive. The Russian administration, created during two different periods (1914-15 and 1916-1917), was called General Government of Galicia and Bukovina.

In late 1918, Eastern Galicia became a part of the restored Republic of Poland, which absorbed the Lemko-Rusyn Republic. The local Ukrainian population briefly declared the independence of Eastern Galicia as the West Ukrainian People's Republic. During the Polish-Soviet War, the Soviets tried to establish the puppet-state of the Galician SSR in East Galicia, the government of which, after a couple of months, was liquidated.

The fate of Galicia was settled by the Peace of Riga on 18 March 1921, giving all of Galicia to the Second Polish Republic. Although never accepted as legitimate by some Ukrainians, it was internationally recognized with significant French support on 15 May 1923. The French support for Polish rule of ethnically mixed eastern Galicia and its oil resources in the Borysław-Drohobycz basin was rewarded by Warsaw, allowing significant French investment to pour into the Galician oil industry. The Poles had convinced the French that since less than 25% of the ethnic Ukrainians were literate before the Great War, and Ukrainians were novices in governing themselves, only the Poles, not the Ukrainians, would be able to administer eastern Galicia and its precious oil assets.

The Ukrainians of the former eastern Galicia and the neighbouring province of Volhynia made up about 12% of the population of the Second Polish Republic, and were its largest minority. As Polish government policies were unfriendly towards minorities, tensions between the Polish government and the Ukrainian population grew, eventually giving rise to the militant underground Organization of Ukrainian Nationalists.

== Administrative divisions ==
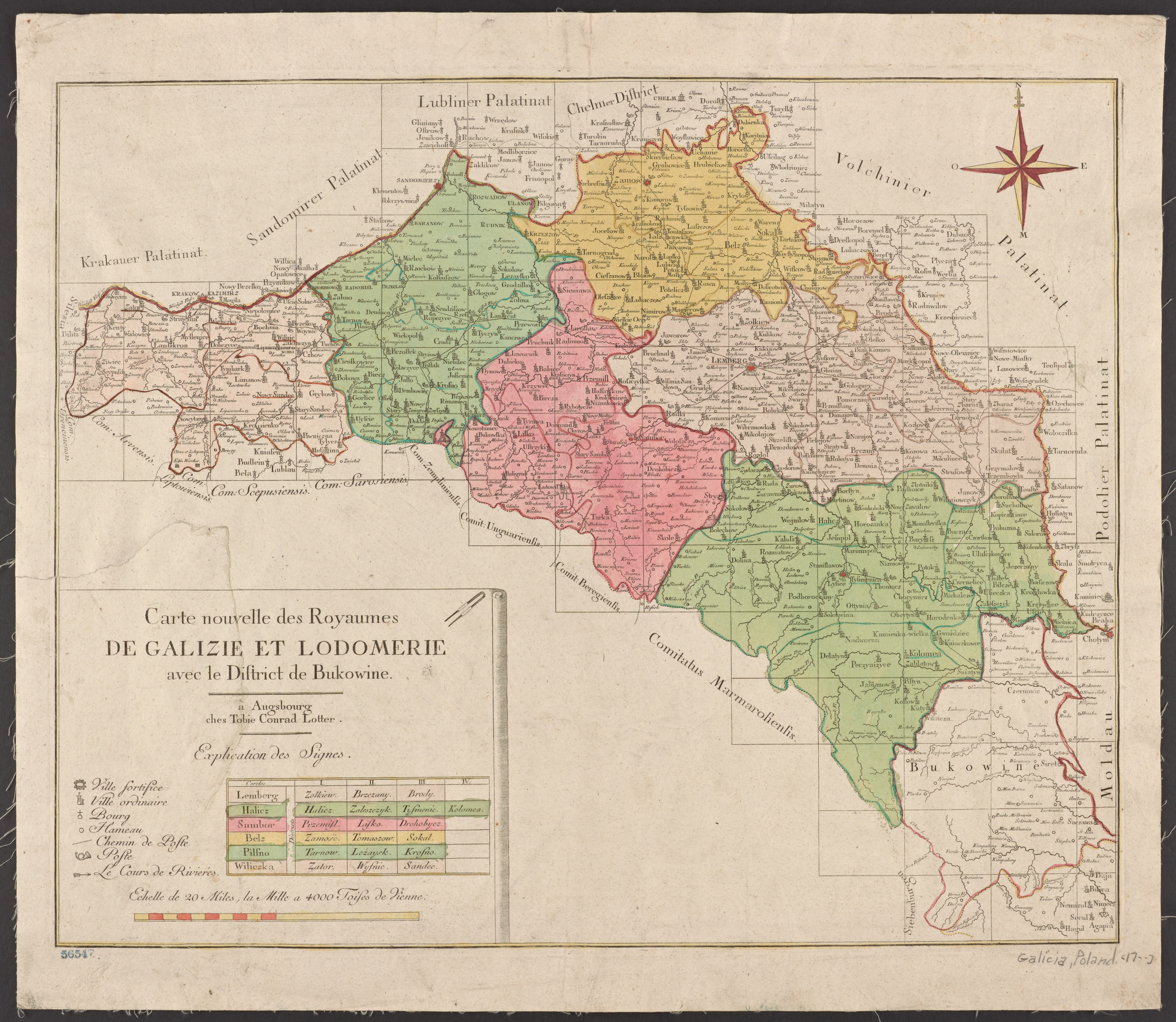
The six Kreise and 19 Kreisdistrikte of Galicia and Lodomeria 1777–1782.

Prior to the First Partition of Poland, which established the kingdom, the region had been divided into Voivodeships (historically also "palatinates"). Specifically, the area that became Galicia and Lodomeria comprised most of the Ruthenian (with the Land of Halicz), Bełz and Kraków Voivodeships and smaller parts of the Podolian, Lublin and Sandomierz Voivodeships.

Soon after the partition the newly acquired Polish territories were organised into six Kreise (lit. 'circles'), named after major centers (Belz, Halych, Lviv, Pilzno, Sambir, Wieliczka). They were subdivided in November 1773 into 59 Kreisdistrikte ("circle districts"); this was reduced to 19 in 1777.

=== Standard Kreise (1782–1850; 1854–1867) ===
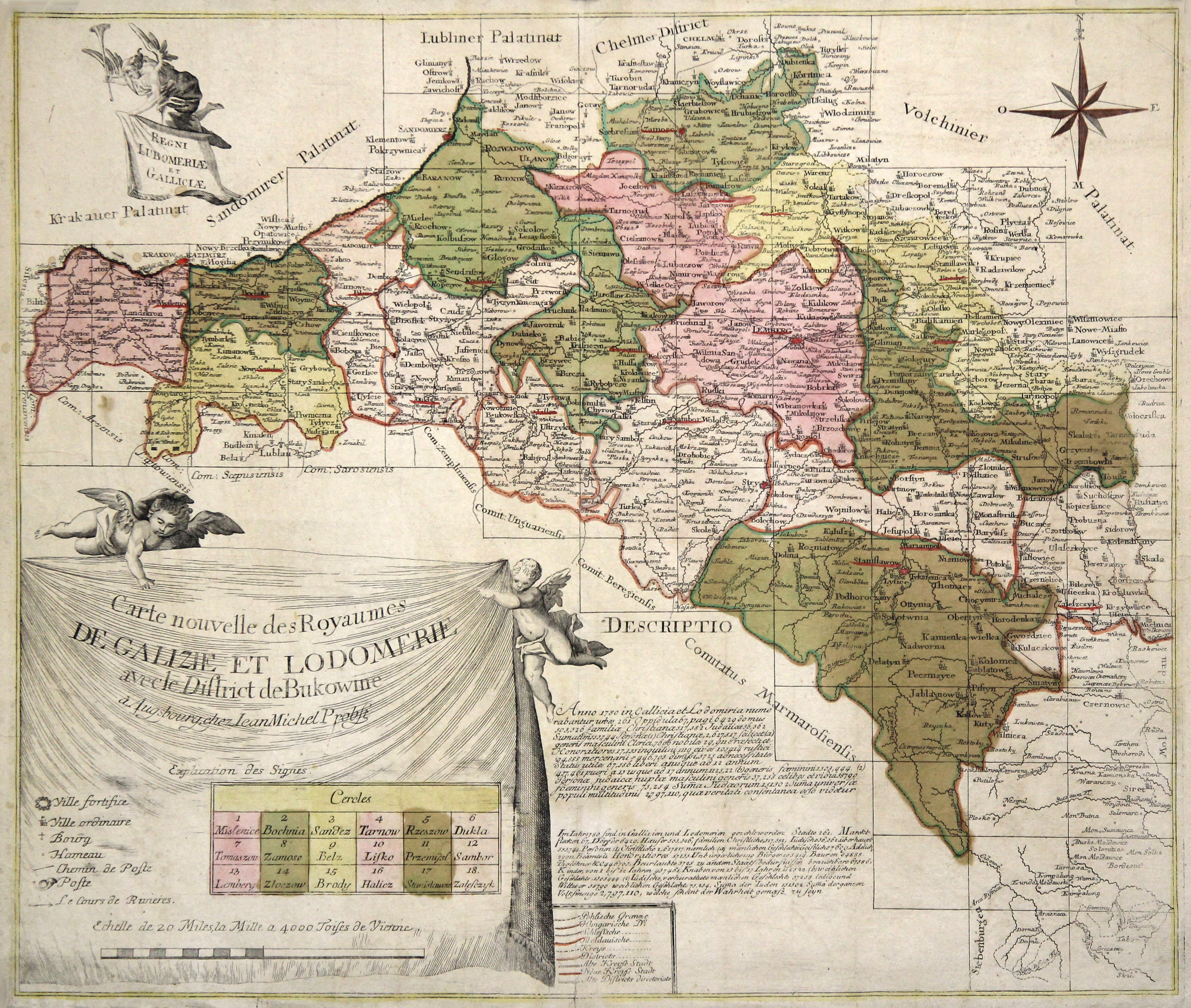
The 18 Kreise of Galicia and Lodomeria c. 1782.

In 1782 the two-level system was abolished and the Kingdom was divided into 18 standard Kreise (sing. Kreis; Polish: cyrkuły, sing. cyrkuł; Ukrainian: округи okruhy, sing. округа okruha), much like the other (non-Hungarian) Habsburg realms. This system remained in place (except 1850–1853) until they were finally abolished in 1867.

In 1786 Bukovina – the former northwestern part of Moldavia which had been occupied by Russia in 1769 (during the Russo-Turkish War) and ceded to the Habsburg monarchy in 1774 as a "token of appreciation" – became part of Galicia as the Bukowiner Kreis. (Prior to that, it had been administered as a military district.)

After the Third Partition of Poland in 1795 the three western-most Kreise – Mislenicer, Sandecer and Bochnier – were transferred to West Galicia (see below). The Dukl(a)er Kreis became the Jasłoer Kreis. West Galicia was merged with Galicia proper in 1803.

In the 1809 Treaty of Schönbrunn which ended the War of the Fifth Coalition, Austria was forced to cede the Zamośćer Kreis (Zamość), along with all of its third partition gains, to the Duchy of Warsaw; these became part of the Russian-controlled Congress Poland in 1815, apart from Kraków (part of West Galicia) which became the Free City of Cracow. Austria was also forced to cede the Tarnopoler Kreis and most of the Zalestschyker Kreis to Russia, which collectively became the Tarnopolsky Krai; the rump of Zalestschyker Kreis was merged with part of the Stanislauer Kreis to form the Kolomeaer Kreis. When the Tarnopolsky Krai was returned to Austria in 1815, the two parts were re-separated; the former Zalestschyker Kreis became the Czortkower Kreis.

By 1815, the Kreise had mostly taken on stable forms. In 1819 the Myslenicer Kreis became the Wadowicer Kreis.

In 1846, Austria annexed the Free City of Cracow and it became the Grand Duchy of Kraków. Administratively, this was treated as the Galician Krakauer Kreis.

In 1850, the Kreise were briefly replaced with Regierungsbezirke and Bezirkshauptmannschaften (see below), but these reforms were reversed in 1853, with the exact administrative structure to be determined. In 1854 the Kreise were formally re-established, sub-divided into Amtsbezirke and grouped into two Verwaltungsgebiete ("administrative regions/territories") – Lemberg (Lviv/Lwów) and Krakau (Krawów). Lemberg and Krakau were themselves statutory cities subordinate directly to the Kingdom.

Below is a list of the Kreise as of 1854 and their Verwaltungsgebiete. Aside from the Verwaltungsgebiete and the addition of Krakau, these had essentially remained consistent since shortly after the end of the Napoleonic wars.

- Verwaltungsgebiet Lemberg, containing the 12 eastern Kreise:
  - Lemberg
  - Zołkiew
  - Przemyśl
  - Sanok
  - Złoczow
  - Brzezan
  - Stryi
  - Sambor
  - Tarnopol
  - Czortkow
  - Kolomea
  - Stanislau
- Verwaltungsgebiet Krakau, containing the 7 western Kreise:
  - Krakau
  - Wadowice
  - Sandec
  - Jasło
  - Rzeszow
  - Tarnow
  - Bochnia

(A listing which includes the Bezirke for each Kreis can be found at Subdivisions of the Kingdom of Galicia and Lodomeria § List of Kreise and Bezirke from 1854.)

In 1860 Verwaltungsgebiet Krakau and Bukovina were dissolved and re-subordinated to Lemberg; the Jasłoer Kreis was split between the Sandecer, Tarnower, Rzeszower and Sanoker Kreise; and the Wadowicer and Bochniaer Kreise were merged into the Krakauer Kreis.

=== Regierungsbezirke and political districts (1850–1853) ===
In 1850 Galicia and Lodomeria was divided into three Regierungsbezirke ("government districts"), named after their capitals: Lemberg (Lviv/Lwów), Krakau (Krawów) and Stanislau (Stanislaviv/Stanisławów; today called Ivano-Frankivsk). The Kreise were abolished and replaced with political districts (Bezirkshauptmannschaften), of which they had 19, 26 and 18 respectively (giving a total of 63).

The Regierungsbezirke and political districts abolished in 1853 and the Kreise formally reinstated in 1854 (see above).

=== Political Districts (1867–1918) ===
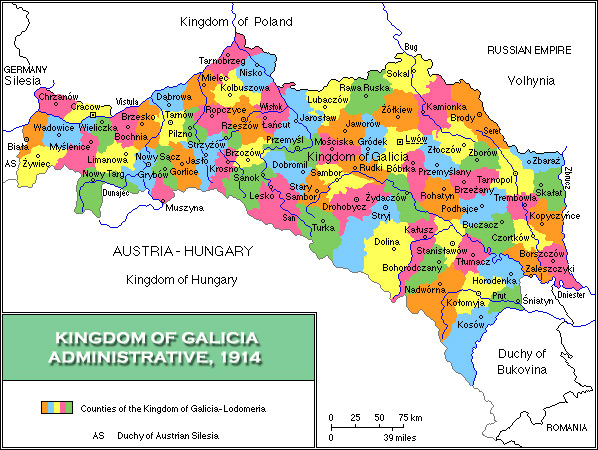
Administrative divisions of the Kingdom of Galicia, 1914

In 1867 the Kingdom was once again split into numerous political districts (German: Bezirkshauptmannschaften), called powiaty (counties) in Polish, of which there were originally 74. In 1914 they numbered 82. Besides Lwów (Lviv in Ukrainian) being the capital of the Kingdom, Kraków was considered as the unofficial capital of the western part of Galicia and the second most important city in the region.

- Belz (Polish: Bełz, Yiddish: Beltz)
- Berezhany (Polish: Brzeżany)
- Biecz (German: Beitsch, Ukrainian: Беч, Bech)
- Bochnia (German: Salzberg)
- Boryslav (Polish: Borysław)
- Brody (Yiddish: Brod)
- Busk
- Buchach (Polish: Buczacz)
- Chortkiv (Polish: Czortków)
- Chrzanów
- Dukla (Ukrainian: Дукля, Duklia)
- Drohobych (Polish: Drohobycz)
- Gorlice (Ukrainian: Горлиці, Horlytsi, German: Gorlitz)
- Halych (Polish: Halicz, German: Halitsch, Yiddish: Galits)
- Husiatyn
- Jarosław (German: Jaroslau, Ukrainian: Ярослав, Yaroslav)
- Jasło (German: Jassel)
- Kalush (Polish: Kałusz)
- Kolomyia (German: Kolomea, Polish: Kołomyja, Romanian: Colomeea, Yiddish: Kolomay)
- Kozova (Polish: Kozowa)
- Kraków (German: Krakau, Yiddish: Kruke)
- Krosno (German: Krossen, Ukrainian: Коросно, Korosno)
- Lesko (Ukrainian: Лісько, Lisko, Yiddish: Linsk)
- Leżajsk (German: Lyschansk, Yiddish: Lizhensk)
- Limanowa (German: Ilmenau)
- Lwów (German: Lemberg, Yiddish: LemberikUkrainian Lviv )
- Łańcut (German: Landshut)
- Machliniec (Ukrainian: Махлинець, Makhlynets)
- Myślenice (German: Mischlenitz)
- Nadvirna (Polish: Nadwórna)
- Nowy Sącz (German: Neu Sandez, Yiddish: Zanz)
- Oświęcim (German: Auschwitz, Yiddish: Oshpetsin)
- Peremyshliany (Polish: Przemyślany)
- Przemyśl (Ukrainian: Перемишль, Peremyshl)
- Pidhaytsi (Polish: Podhajce)
- Rava-Ruska (Polish: Rawa Ruska, Yiddish: Rave)
- Rohatyn (Ukrainian: Рогатин, Yiddish: ראהאטין)
- Rymanów (German: Reimannshau)
- Rzeszów (Yiddish: Rejsza, Ukrainian: Riashiv, German: Reichshof)
- Sambir (Polish: Sambor)
- Sanok (Ukrainian: Сянік, Sianik, Yiddish: Sonik, Hungarian: Sánók)
- Stanisławów (Ukrainian: Stanyslaviv, German: Stanislau, Yiddish: Stanislev; renamed in 1962 to Ivano-Frankivsk)
- Ternopil (Polish: Tarnopol)
- Trembowla (Ukrainian: Terebovla)
- Tarnów (Ukrainian: Тарнів, Tarniv, German: Tarnau)
- Tomaszów Lubelski (Ukrainian: Tomashiv Liublinskyi)
- Truskavets (Polish: Truskawiec)
- Wieliczka (German: Groß Salze)
- Zalishchyky (Polish: Zaleszczyki)
- Zator (German: Neuenstadt an der Schaue)
- Zolochiv (Polish: Złoczów, Yiddish: Zlotshev)
- Zhovkva (Polish: Żółkiew)
- Żywiec (Ukrainian: Живець, Zhyvets, German: Saybusch)

=== Other administrative entities ===
==== West Galicia ====
West Galicia was part of the Kingdom from 1795 to 1809, until 1803 as a separate administrative unit. As with the rest of Galicia, it was divided into Kreise:

- Biała Podlaska
- Chełm
- Józefów
- Kielce
- Końskie
- Kraków
- Lublin
- Łuków at Radzyń Podlaski
- Mińsk at Wiązowna
- Radom
- Sandomierz, from 1798 at Opatów
- Siedlce

==== Bukovina District ====
Bukovina was part of the Kingdom from 1786 to 1849 (after 1849: Duchy of Bukovina).

==== Free City of Cracow ====
The Free City of Cracow was a co-protectorate with Prussia and Russia from 1815 to 1846. It was annexed by Austria in 1846 as the Grand Duchy of Kraków and became de facto part of the Kingdom.

== Government ==
After the partition of Poland, the region was governed by an appointed governor, later a vice-regent. During the war time, the office of the vice-regent was supplemented by a military-governor. In 1861, a regional assembly was established, the Sejm of the Land, which initially, due to a lack of adequate administrative building, was located in the building of the Skarbek Theatre until 1890.

=== Vice-Regents ===
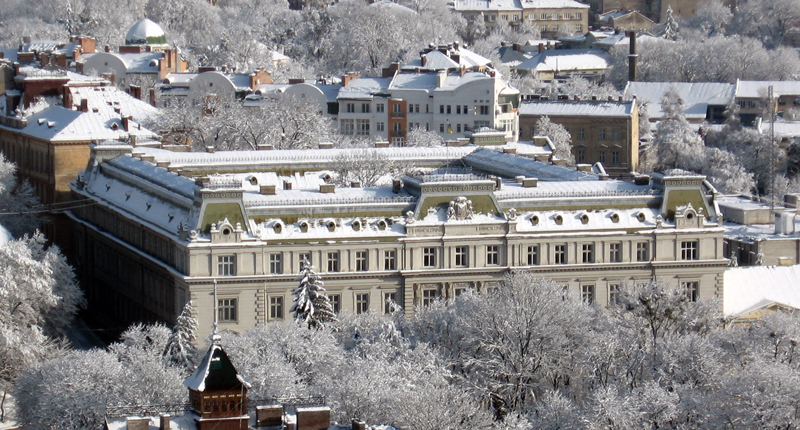
The Vice-regency Office in Lviv

List of vice-regents since 1900:

- Count Leon Piniński (31 March 1898 – June 1903)
- Count Andrzej Kazimierz Potocki (8 June 1903 – 12 April 1908)
- Count Michał Bobrzyński (28 April 1908 – 14 May 1913)
- Witold Korytowski (14 May 1913 – 20 August 1915)
- Russian occupation of Galicia (September 1914 – 1915)
- Hermann von Colard (August 1915 – 8 April 1916)
- Baron Erich von Diller (April 1916 – March 1917), exiled due to Russian occupation
- Russian occupation (1916 – 26 July 1917)
- Count Karl Georg Huyn (1917 – 1 November 1918), in fact subordinate to the Regency Council and its General Commissar Prince Witold Leon Czartoryski instead of the Austrian Crown.

=== Political parties and public organisations ===
==== Political ====
- Chief Ruthenian Council (2 May 1848 – 1851), headed by Gregory Yakhimovich and later by Mykhailo Kuzemsky. It consisted of 30 members.
- Ruthenian Council (Lviv) (1870–1814)
- Ruthenian Congress (23 May 1848) was an oppositional political formation to the Chief Ruthenian Council, to which belonged such personalities as Ivan Vahylevych, Julian Lawriwskyj, Leon Sapieha, and others.
- Ukrainian National Democratic Party (1899–1919) was created in place of the People's Council (1885–1899), eventually becoming part of the Ukrainian National Democratic Alliance (UNDO)
- Ukrainian Radical Party (1890–1939)
- Christian-Social Party (1896–1930), until 1911 was called the Catholic-Ruthenian People's Union, in 1930 it split when some members joined UNDO, while others created the Ukrainian Catholic People's Party.
- Ukrainian Social Democratic Party (1899–1939), was created by some members of the Ukrainian Radical Party and in 1924 partially merged with Communist Party of Western Ukraine (1919–1938)
- Ukrainian General Council (1914–1916), initially as the Chief Ukrainian Council, was a national political bloc of most of the Ukrainian parties. It laid the foundation for creating the Ukrainian state in the West Ukraine.

==== Public ====
- Ukrainian Forum (Besida) (until 1928 Ruthenian Forum) (1861–1939), a forum-type association created by Julian Lawriwskyj based on the Lviv intelligentsia circle, "Young Rus". The organization established its own Ukrainian-based professional theater (1864–1924).
- Prosvita (1868–present)
- Shevchenko Scientific Society (1873–present)
- Ruthenian Triad (1833–1843), literary organization discontinued after the death of Markiyan Shashkevych
- Academic Society (Hromada) (1882–1921), until 1896 as Brotherhood
- Academical Circle (1874–1877)
- Polish Sokół movement and Ukrainian Sokil movement, sport organizations created in light of the European gymnastics movement
- Sich and Plast
- Luh, a fireman society
- Riflemen's Association

== Demographics ==
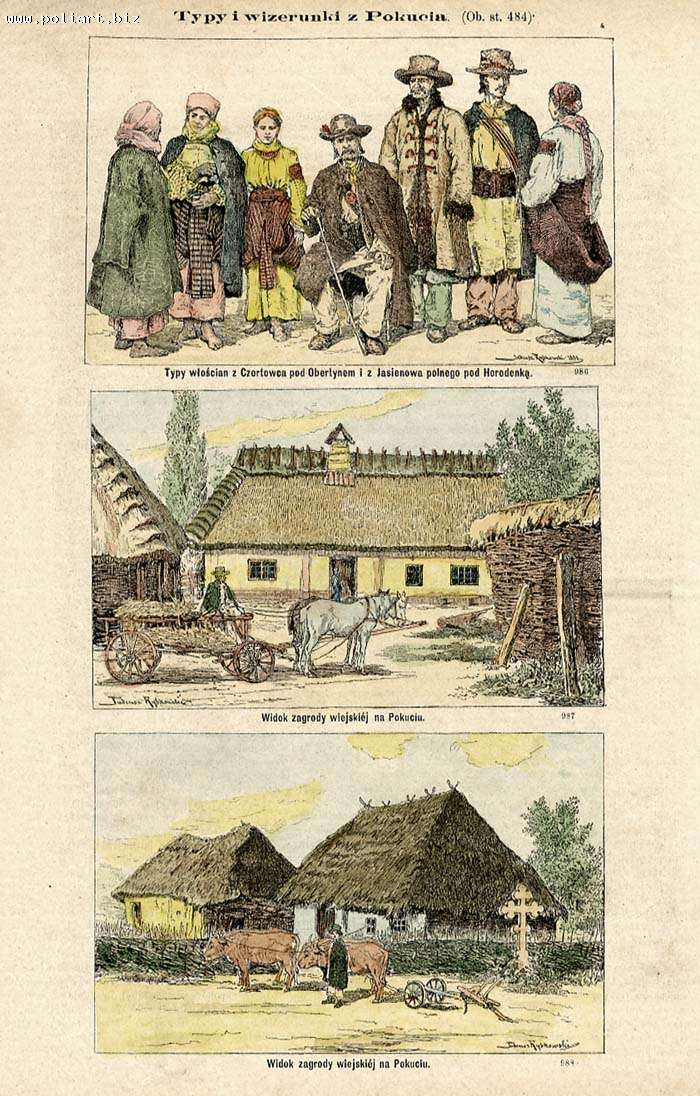
People of East Galicia

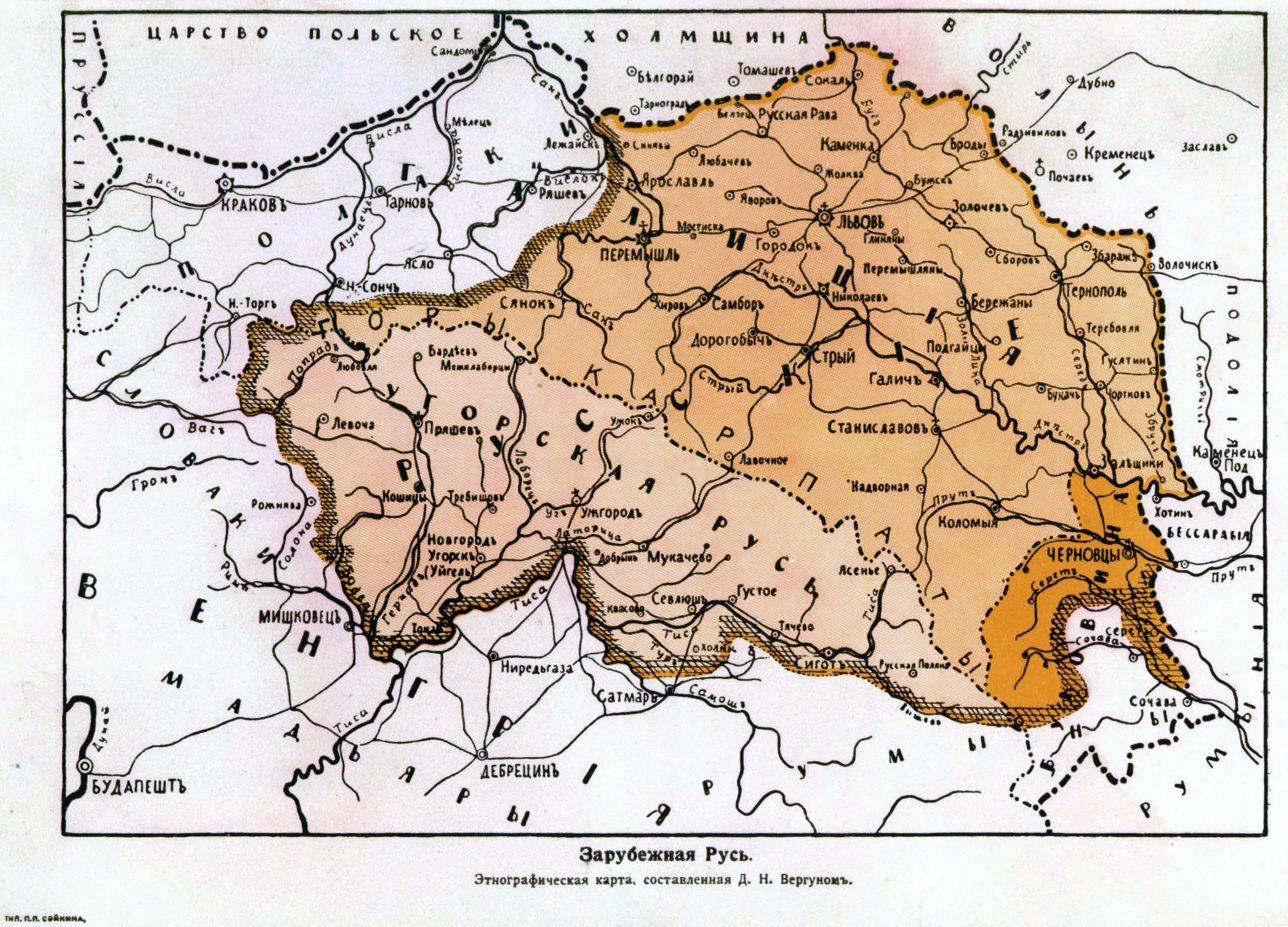
Map of a region where Ruthenians (considered "Russians" by the Russian Empire) lived in the Austrian Empire – Galicia and "Hungarian Russia" (Carpathian Ruthenia) – by Dmitry Vergun

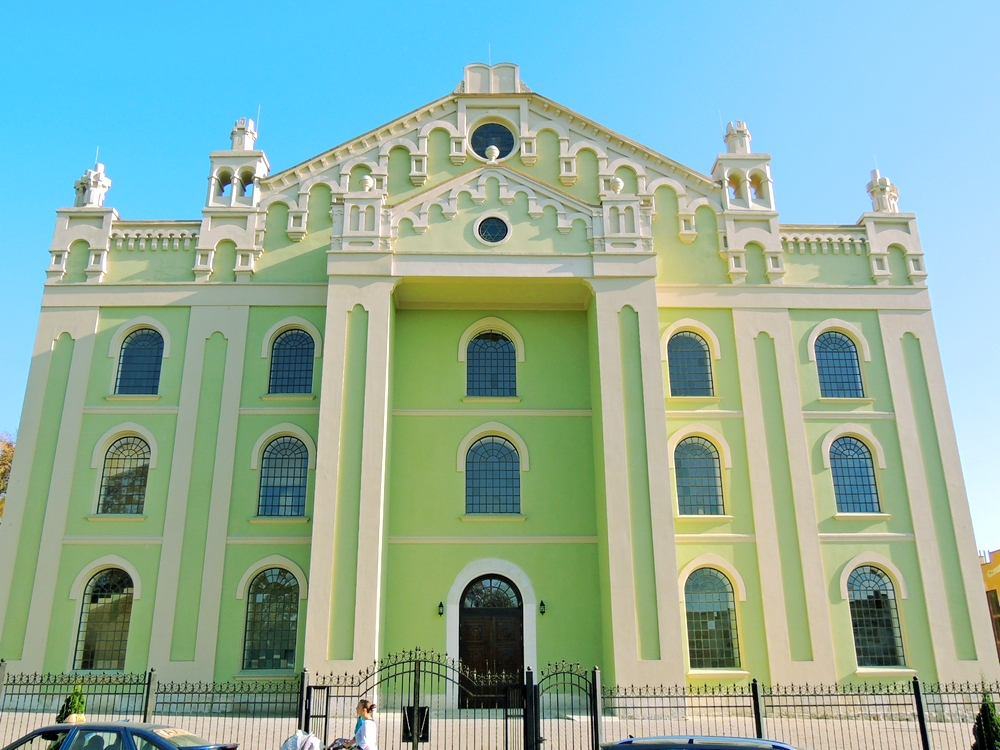
Until 1918, Choral Synagogue of Drohobych had been the central synagogue of Galicia and Lodomeria

In 1773, Galicia had about 2.6 million inhabitants in 280 cities and markets and approx. 5,500 villages. There were nearly 19,000 noble families with 95,000 members (about 3% of the population). The "non-free" accounted for 1.86 million, more than 70% of the population. A small number were full farmers, but by far the overwhelming number (84%) had only smallholdings or no possessions.

No country of the Austrian monarchy had such a varied ethnic mix as Galicia: Poles, Ruthenians, Germans (Galician Germans), Armenians, Jews, Hungarians, Romani people, Lipowaner, etc. The Poles were mainly in the west, with the Ruthenians (Ukrainians) predominant in the eastern region (Ruthenia).

The Jews of Galicia had immigrated in the Middle Ages from Germany and mostly spoke Yiddish as their first language. German-speaking people were more commonly referred to as "Saxons" or "Swabians", even though most of them did not come from Saxony or Swabia (cf. Transylvanian Saxons and Danube Swabians). There were also some Mennonites who mostly came originally from Switzerland, but spoke a dialect of Palatine German which is close to Pennsylvania German. With inhabitants who had a clear difference in language, such as with the Saxons or the Roma, identification was less problematic, but widespread multilingualness blurred the borders again.

It is however possible to make a clear distinction in religious denominations: the majority of the Poles were Latin Catholics, while the Ruthenians were mostly Greek Catholics (formerly part of the Metropolis of Kiev, Galicia and all Ruthenia in the Ruthenian Uniate Church). In Galicia, there were few Eastern Orthodox Christians, who were concentrated mainly in Bukovina (part of the Kingdom from 1786 to 1849), and had their own eparchy (diocese), centered previously at Rădăuți, and since 1782 in Chernivtsi.

The Jews, who represented the third largest religious group, were mostly traditional in their religious observance, which later developed into Orthodox Judaism. The Jewish community had a strong sense of Galician identity and called themselves Galitzianer to distinguish themselves from the other Ashkenazi communities of Eastern Europe. The Jewish community of Galicia was largely Orthodox or Hasidic in 1772 and many regarded the reforms introduced by the Emperor Joseph II, such as the introduction of conscription, as a form of oppression, leading the Galitzianer to split between the Orthodox and Hasidic communities committed to the traditional values vs. the "modernisers" who wanted to change.

The average life expectancy was 27 years for men and 28.5 years for women, as compared to 33 and 37 in Bohemia, 39 and 41 in France and 40 and 42 in England. Also, the quality of life was much lower as Galicia was the poorest province in the Austrian Empire. The yearly consumption of meat did not exceed 10 kg (22 lb) per capita, as compared to 24 kg (53 lb) in Hungary and 33 in Germany. This was mostly due to a much lower average income. In 2014, The Economist reported: "Poverty in Galicia in the 19th century was so extreme that it had become proverbial—the region was called Golicja and Glodomeria, a play on the official name (Galicja i Lodomeria) and goly (naked) and glodny (hungry)."

In 1888, Galicia extended over 78,550 square kilometres (30,328 sq mi) and had a population of about 6.4 million people, including 4.8 million peasants (75% of the whole population). The population density, at 81 people per square kilometre, was higher than that of France (71 inhabitants/km^{2}) or Germany. The population rose to 7.3 million in 1900 and to 8 million in 1910.

Religions demographics (per the December 1910 census)
Religion	Adherents	
Roman Catholic	3,731,569	46.5%
Greek Catholic	3,379,613	42.1%
Jewish	871,895	10.9%
Protestant	37,144	0.5%
Other	5,454	<0.1%
Total	8,025,675	

=== Linguistic and religious structure in 1910 ===
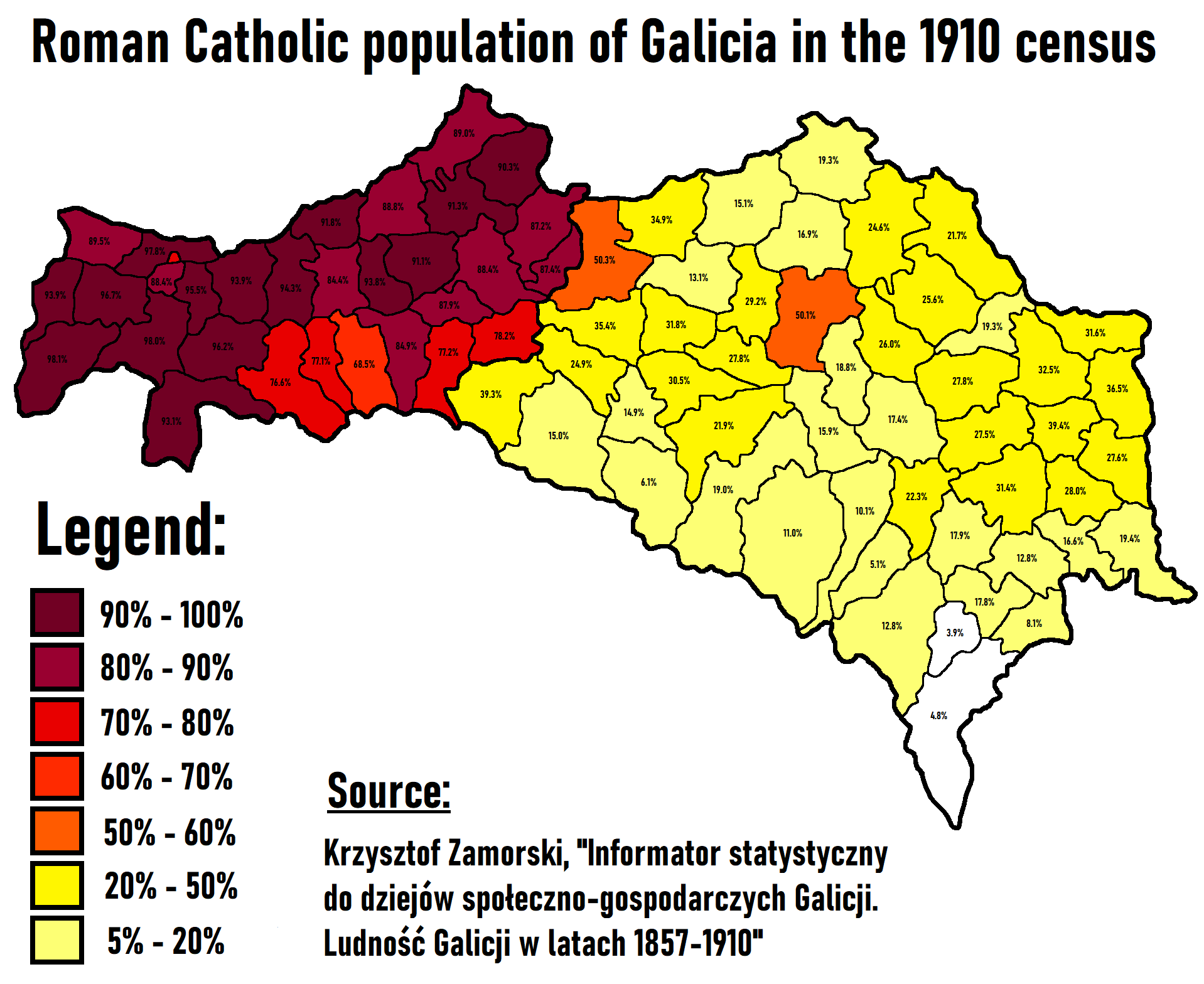
Roman Catholic population of Galicia in the 1910 census

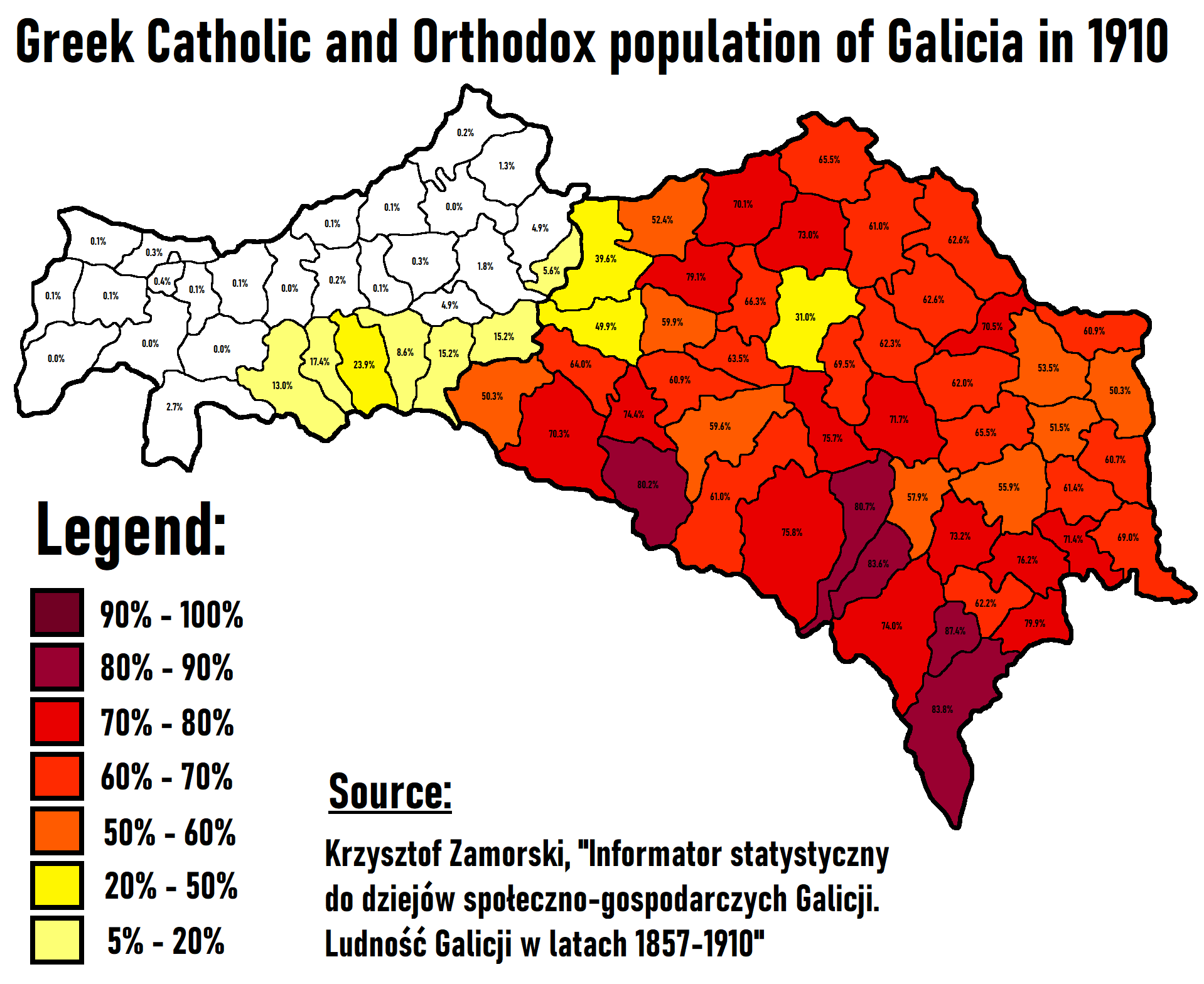
Greek Catholic and Eastern Orthodox population of Galicia in 1910

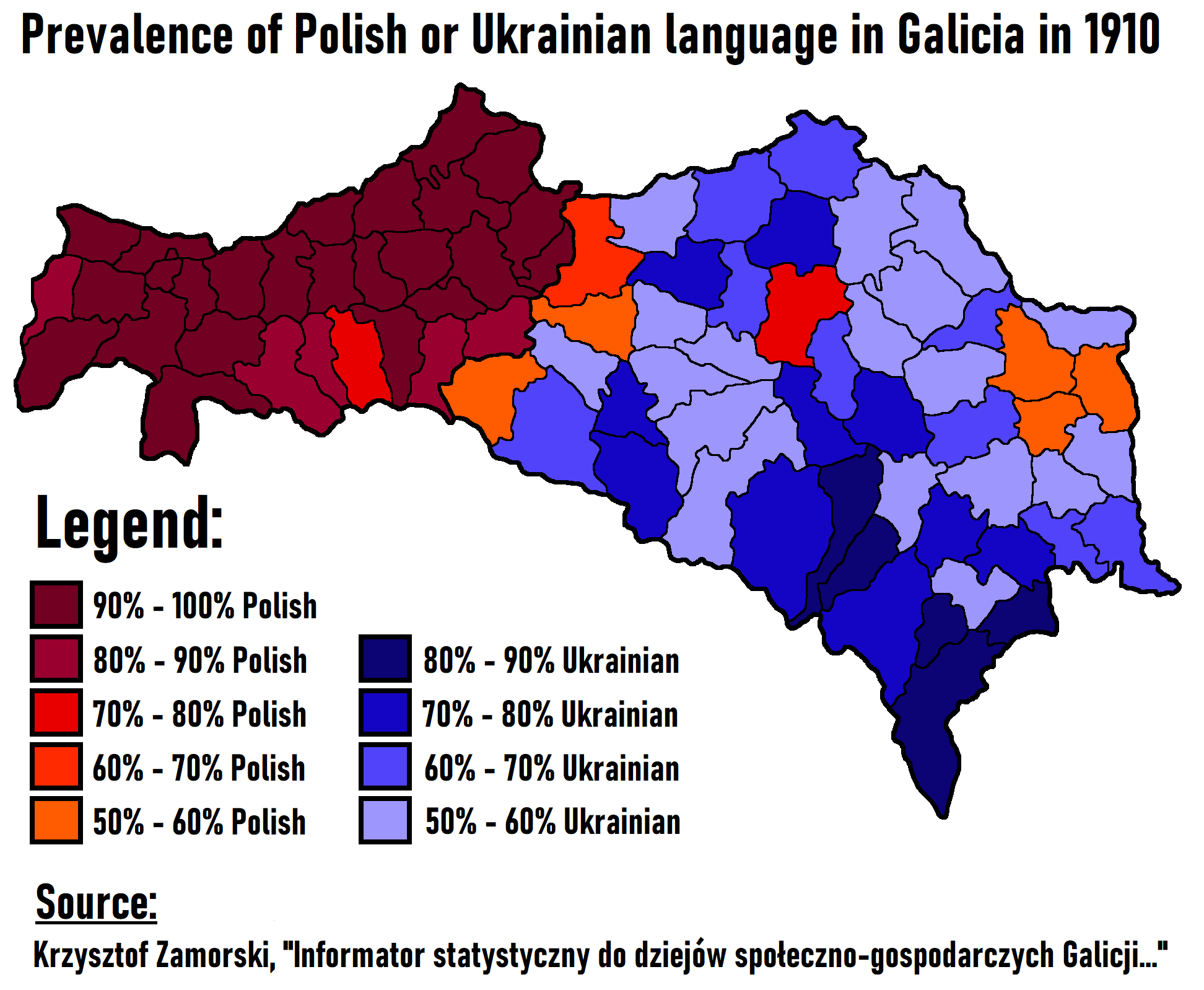
Prevalence of Polish or Ukrainian language in Galicia in 1910

Linguistic and religious structure of Galicia according to the 1910 Austrian census
Today part of	County	Pop.	Polish	Ruthenian (Ukrainian)	Other Slavic	German	Other language	Roman Catholic	Protestant	Uniate	Eastern Orthodox	Jewish	Other religion
(Poland)	Kraków City	151886	94.4%	0.4%	1.8%	3.4%	0.0%	76.8%	0.7%	1.1%	0.0%	21.3%	0.0%
(Poland)	Biała	86174	83.0%	0.0%	0.3%	16.7%	0.0%	93.9%	2.8%	0.1%	0.0%	3.1%	0.0%
(Poland)	Bochnia	114401	99.8%	0.0%	0.0%	0.2%	0.0%	93.9%	0.2%	0.1%	0.0%	5.8%	0.0%
(Poland)	Brzesko	104498	100.0%	0.0%	0.0%	0.0%	0.0%	94.3%	0.0%	0.0%	0.0%	5.6%	0.0%
(Poland)	Chrzanów	110838	99.6%	0.0%	0.1%	0.3%	0.0%	89.5%	0.1%	0.1%	0.0%	10.3%	0.0%
(Poland)	Dąbrowa	69119	100.0%	0.0%	0.0%	0.0%	0.0%	91.8%	0.0%	0.1%	0.0%	8.1%	0.0%
(Poland)	Gorlice	82203	75.6%	24.2%	0.1%	0.1%	0.0%	68.5%	0.0%	23.9%	0.0%	7.5%	0.0%
(Poland)	Grybów	53240	82.2%	17.7%	0.0%	0.0%	0.0%	77.1%	0.0%	17.4%	0.0%	5.5%	0.0%
(Poland)	Jasło	87878	91.6%	8.4%	0.0%	0.0%	0.0%	84.9%	0.0%	8.6%	0.0%	6.5%	0.0%
(Poland)	Kolbuszowa	73912	99.7%	0.0%	0.0%	0.3%	0.0%	91.3%	0.2%	0.0%	0.0%	8.5%	0.0%
(Poland)	Kraków County	68829	99.2%	0.2%	0.2%	0.4%	0.0%	97.8%	0.1%	0.3%	0.0%	1.8%	0.0%
(Poland)	Krosno	83115	84.6%	15.4%	0.0%	0.1%	0.0%	77.2%	0.0%	15.2%	0.0%	7.5%	0.0%
(Poland)	Łańcut	93532	96.8%	3.0%	0.0%	0.1%	0.0%	87.2%	0.3%	5.0%	0.0%	7.5%	0.0%
(Poland)	Limanowa	81163	99.9%	0.0%	0.0%	0.0%	0.0%	96.2%	0.0%	0.0%	0.0%	3.8%	0.0%
(Poland)	Mielec	77218	98.5%	0.0%	0.0%	1.4%	0.0%	88.8%	1.1%	0.1%	0.0%	10.0%	0.0%
(Poland)	Myślenice	93241	99.9%	0.0%	0.0%	0.1%	0.0%	98.0%	0.0%	0.0%	0.0%	2.0%	0.0%
(Poland)	Nisko	69194	99.8%	0.0%	0.0%	0.2%	0.0%	90.3%	0.2%	1.3%	0.0%	8.2%	0.0%
(Poland)	Nowy Sącz	131366	86.5%	12.8%	0.0%	0.7%	0.0%	76.6%	1.2%	13.0%	0.0%	9.3%	0.0%
(Poland)	Nowy Targ	80767	99.5%	0.5%	0.0%	0.0%	0.0%	93.1%	0.1%	2.7%	0.0%	4.1%	0.0%
(Poland)	Oświęcim	49996	99.1%	0.1%	0.3%	0.6%	0.0%	86.4%	0.2%	0.3%	0.0%	13.1%	0.0%
(Poland)	Pilzno	48673	100.0%	0.0%	0.0%	0.0%	0.0%	93.8%	0.0%	0.1%	0.0%	6.1%	0.0%
(Poland)	Podgórze	64383	98.2%	0.1%	1.0%	0.8%	0.0%	88.4%	0.2%	0.4%	0.0%	11.0%	0.0%
(Poland)	Przeworsk	57044	98.4%	1.5%	0.0%	0.0%	0.0%	87.4%	0.0%	5.6%	0.0%	6.9%	0.0%
(Poland)	Ropczyce	80170	99.6%	0.2%	0.0%	0.1%	0.0%	91.1%	0.0%	0.3%	0.0%	8.5%	0.0%
(Poland)	Rzeszów	144271	99.1%	0.5%	0.1%	0.3%	0.0%	88.4%	0.1%	1.8%	0.0%	9.7%	0.0%
(Poland)	Strzyżów	58549	95.5%	4.5%	0.0%	0.0%	0.0%	87.9%	0.0%	4.9%	0.0%	7.2%	0.0%
(Poland)	Tarnobrzeg	77360	99.9%	0.1%	0.0%	0.0%	0.0%	89.0%	0.0%	0.2%	0.0%	10.7%	0.0%
(Poland)	Tarnów	114118	99.3%	0.1%	0.2%	0.5%	0.0%	84.4%	0.1%	0.2%	0.0%	15.4%	0.0%
(Poland)	Wadowice	95339	99.7%	0.0%	0.1%	0.2%	0.0%	96.7%	0.1%	0.1%	0.0%	3.1%	0.0%
(Poland)	Wieliczka	67724	99.9%	0.0%	0.0%	0.1%	0.0%	95.5%	0.2%	0.1%	0.0%	4.2%	0.0%
(Poland)	Żywiec	119653	99.5%	0.0%	0.0%	0.5%	0.0%	98.1%	0.2%	0.0%	0.0%	1.6%	0.0%
(Ukraine)	Lwów City	206129	85.8%	10.8%	0.4%	2.9%	0.1%	51.2%	1.5%	19.2%	0.3%	27.8%	0.1%
(Ukraine)	Bibrka	88527	30.1%	69.1%	0.0%	0.8%	0.0%	18.8%	0.2%	69.5%	0.0%	11.5%	0.0%
(Ukraine)	Bohorodchany	69463	13.7%	84.9%	0.1%	1.3%	0.0%	5.1%	0.6%	83.6%	0.0%	10.8%	0.0%
(Ukraine)	Borshchiv	109320	31.0%	68.6%	0.0%	0.4%	0.0%	19.4%	0.0%	68.9%	0.0%	11.7%	0.0%
(Ukraine)	Brody	146216	37.8%	59.6%	0.0%	2.5%	0.2%	21.7%	0.2%	62.4%	0.3%	15.5%	0.0%
(Ukraine)	Berezhany	104810	40.9%	58.9%	0.0%	0.1%	0.0%	27.8%	0.0%	62.0%	0.0%	10.3%	0.0%
(Poland)	Brzozów	81409	87.9%	12.1%	0.0%	0.0%	0.0%	78.2%	0.0%	15.2%	0.0%	6.5%	0.0%
(Ukraine)	Buchach	138297	46.6%	53.0%	0.0%	0.4%	0.0%	31.4%	0.0%	55.9%	0.0%	12.6%	0.0%
(Poland)	Cieszanów	86549	48.1%	51.4%	0.0%	0.5%	0.0%	34.9%	0.2%	52.4%	0.0%	12.5%	0.0%
(Ukraine)	Chortkiv	76447	39.1%	59.7%	0.2%	1.0%	0.0%	28.0%	0.2%	61.3%	0.0%	10.4%	0.0%
(Ukraine)	Dobromyl	72103	39.2%	59.7%	0.0%	1.1%	0.0%	24.9%	0.7%	64.0%	0.0%	10.5%	0.0%
(Ukraine)	Dolyna	113831	21.4%	74.9%	0.0%	3.7%	0.0%	10.8%	2.1%	75.8%	0.0%	11.3%	0.0%
(Ukraine)	Drohobych	171687	41.3%	56.7%	0.0%	2.0%	0.0%	21.9%	1.3%	59.6%	0.0%	17.2%	0.0%
(Ukraine)	Horodok	79612	35.0%	62.7%	0.0%	2.3%	0.0%	29.2%	2.2%	58.7%	0.0%	9.9%	0.0%
(Ukraine)	Horodenka	92033	26.9%	72.9%	0.1%	0.1%	0.0%	12.8%	0.0%	76.2%	0.1%	11.0%	0.0%
(Ukraine)	Husiatyn	96891	44.2%	55.7%	0.0%	0.1%	0.0%	27.6%	0.0%	60.7%	0.0%	11.6%	0.0%
(Poland)	Jarosław	150301	66.7%	32.0%	0.6%	0.6%	0.0%	50.3%	0.1%	39.6%	0.0%	10.0%	0.0%
(Ukraine)	Yavoriv	86720	20.6%	78.3%	0.0%	1.1%	0.0%	13.1%	0.5%	79.0%	0.1%	7.3%	0.0%
(Ukraine)	Kalush	97421	17.1%	81.2%	0.0%	1.6%	0.0%	10.1%	0.8%	80.7%	0.0%	8.4%	0.0%
(Ukraine)	Kamianka-Buzka	115316	39.7%	58.4%	0.0%	1.7%	0.2%	24.6%	1.6%	60.7%	0.3%	12.7%	0.0%
(Ukraine)	Kolomyia	124850	38.1%	59.2%	0.2%	2.4%	0.0%	17.8%	0.9%	62.0%	0.2%	19.1%	0.0%
(Ukraine)	Kosiv	85805	15.1%	84.1%	0.0%	0.8%	0.0%	4.8%	0.0%	83.8%	0.0%	11.3%	0.0%
(Poland)	Lesko	98492	30.2%	68.9%	0.0%	0.9%	0.0%	15.0%	0.6%	70.3%	0.0%	14.1%	0.0%
(Ukraine)	Lwów County	161580	61.6%	36.6%	0.0%	1.8%	0.0%	43.4%	2.1%	45.8%	0.0%	8.7%	0.0%
(Ukraine)	Mostyska	87841	43.8%	56.1%	0.0%	0.1%	0.0%	31.8%	0.1%	59.9%	0.0%	8.2%	0.0%
(Ukraine)	Nadvírna	90663	25.4%	73.4%	0.0%	1.1%	0.0%	12.8%	0.6%	74.0%	0.0%	12.6%	0.0%
(Ukraine)	Pechenizhyn	46794	12.1%	87.8%	0.0%	0.1%	0.0%	3.6%	0.0%	87.4%	0.0%	9.0%	0.0%
(Ukraine)	Pidhaitsi	93546	33.4%	65.9%	0.0%	0.7%	0.0%	26.7%	0.0%	65.5%	0.0%	7.8%	0.0%
(Poland)	Przemyśl	159991	52.4%	44.9%	0.4%	2.2%	0.0%	35.4%	0.4%	49.9%	0.1%	14.1%	0.1%
(Ukraine)	Peremyshliany	86568	39.5%	59.5%	0.0%	1.0%	0.0%	26.0%	0.7%	62.3%	0.0%	11.0%	0.0%
(Ukraine)	Rava-Ruska	115333	32.0%	67.0%	0.0%	1.0%	0.0%	15.0%	0.4%	70.1%	0.0%	14.5%	0.1%
(Ukraine)	Rohatyn	124966	29.2%	70.6%	0.0%	0.2%	0.0%	17.4%	0.1%	71.7%	0.0%	10.8%	0.0%
(Ukraine)	Rudky	77269	39.1%	60.5%	0.0%	0.4%	0.0%	27.8%	0.4%	63.5%	0.0%	8.3%	0.0%
(Ukraine)	Sambir	107445	41.7%	57.1%	0.0%	1.2%	0.0%	30.5%	0.3%	60.9%	0.0%	8.2%	0.0%
(Poland)	Sanok	108678	54.4%	45.4%	0.0%	0.2%	0.0%	39.3%	0.0%	50.3%	0.0%	10.4%	0.0%
(Ukraine)	Skałat	96006	52.0%	47.7%	0.0%	0.3%	0.0%	36.5%	0.0%	50.3%	0.0%	13.1%	0.0%
(Ukraine)	Skole	55353	18.1%	77.8%	0.0%	4.1%	0.0%	10.9%	1.0%	77.4%	0.0%	10.7%	0.0%
(Ukraine)	Sniatyn	88706	17.3%	80.5%	0.0%	2.1%	0.0%	8.1%	0.5%	79.7%	0.1%	11.5%	0.0%
(Ukraine)	Sokal	109250	39.7%	60.2%	0.0%	0.1%	0.0%	19.3%	0.2%	65.5%	0.0%	14.9%	0.0%
(Ukraine)	Stanyslaviv	158066	39.6%	57.5%	0.3%	2.5%	0.1%	22.3%	0.9%	57.6%	0.2%	18.8%	0.1%
(Ukraine)	Staryi Sambir	60810	27.4%	72.4%	0.0%	0.1%	0.0%	14.9%	0.0%	74.4%	0.0%	10.7%	0.0%
(Ukraine)	Stryi	80211	37.6%	58.3%	0.1%	4.0%	0.0%	19.0%	4.0%	61.0%	0.0%	15.9%	0.0%
(Ukraine)	Ternopol	142138	51.4%	48.0%	0.1%	0.4%	0.0%	32.5%	0.1%	53.5%	0.0%	13.9%	0.0%
(Ukraine)	Tlumach	116066	27.4%	71.8%	0.0%	0.8%	0.0%	17.9%	0.7%	73.2%	0.0%	8.3%	0.0%
(Ukraine)	Trebowla	81048	51.7%	48.0%	0.2%	0.1%	0.0%	39.4%	0.1%	51.5%	0.0%	9.0%	0.0%
(Ukraine)	Turka	85823	19.9%	79.8%	0.1%	0.3%	0.0%	6.1%	0.1%	80.2%	0.0%	13.6%	0.0%
(Ukraine)	Zalishchyky	76957	30.3%	69.2%	0.1%	0.4%	0.0%	16.6%	0.0%	71.3%	0.1%	12.0%	0.0%
(Ukraine)	Zbarazh	71498	43.0%	57.0%	0.0%	0.0%	0.0%	31.6%	0.0%	60.9%	0.0%	7.5%	0.0%
(Ukraine)	Zboriv	60665	32.0%	67.9%	0.0%	0.1%	0.0%	19.3%	0.0%	70.5%	0.0%	10.2%	0.0%
(Ukraine)	Zolochiv	117372	40.3%	59.1%	0.1%	0.6%	0.0%	25.6%	0.3%	62.6%	0.0%	11.6%	0.0%
(Ukraine)	Zhovkva	99658	25.9%	72.3%	0.0%	1.7%	0.0%	16.9%	0.5%	73.0%	0.0%	9.6%	0.0%
(Ukraine)	Zhydachiv	83339	22.4%	74.7%	0.0%	2.9%	0.0%	15.9%	0.2%	75.7%	0.0%	8.2%	0.0%

=== Linguistic and religious structure of former Galicia in 1931 ===
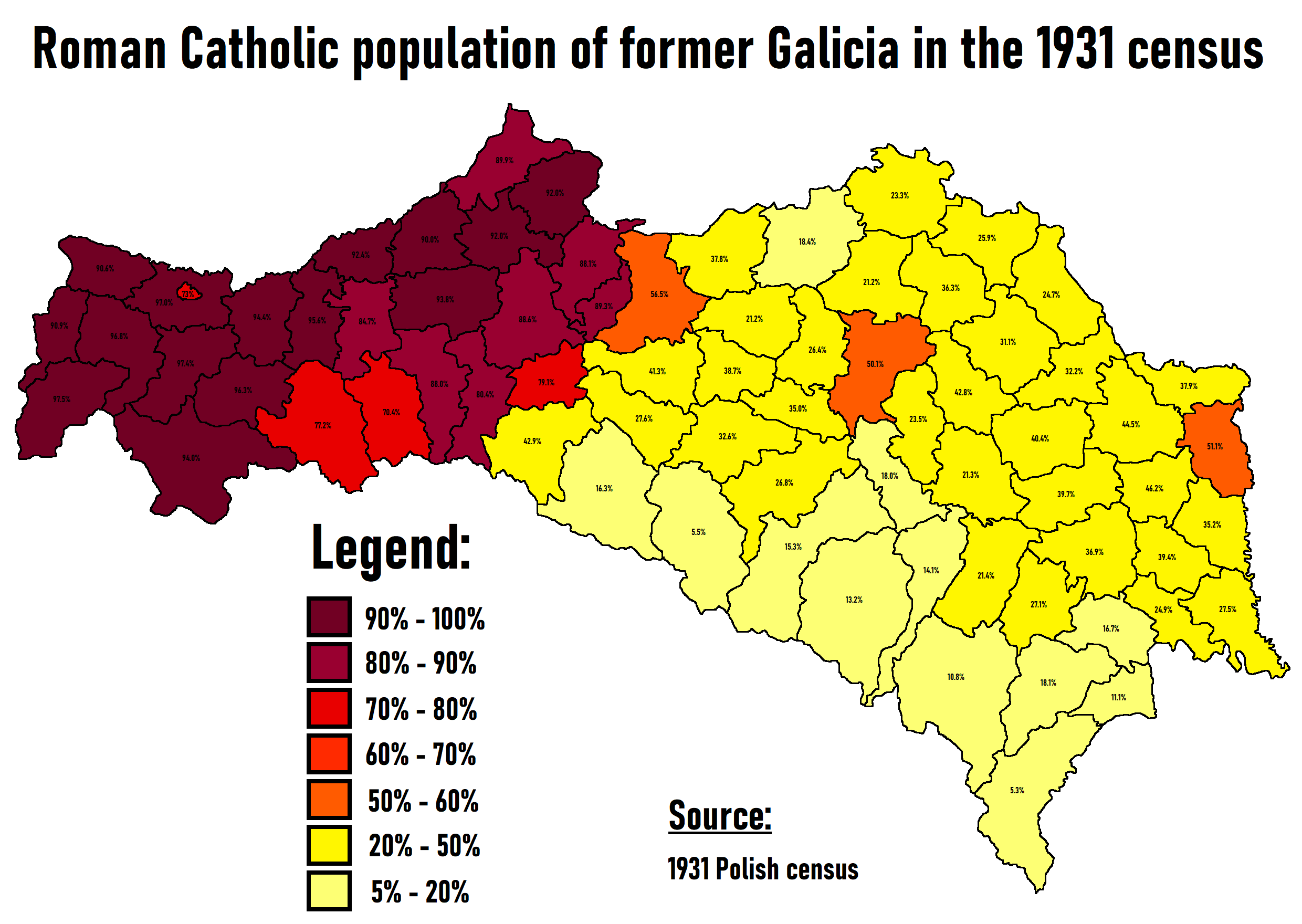
Roman Catholic population of former Galicia in the 1931 census

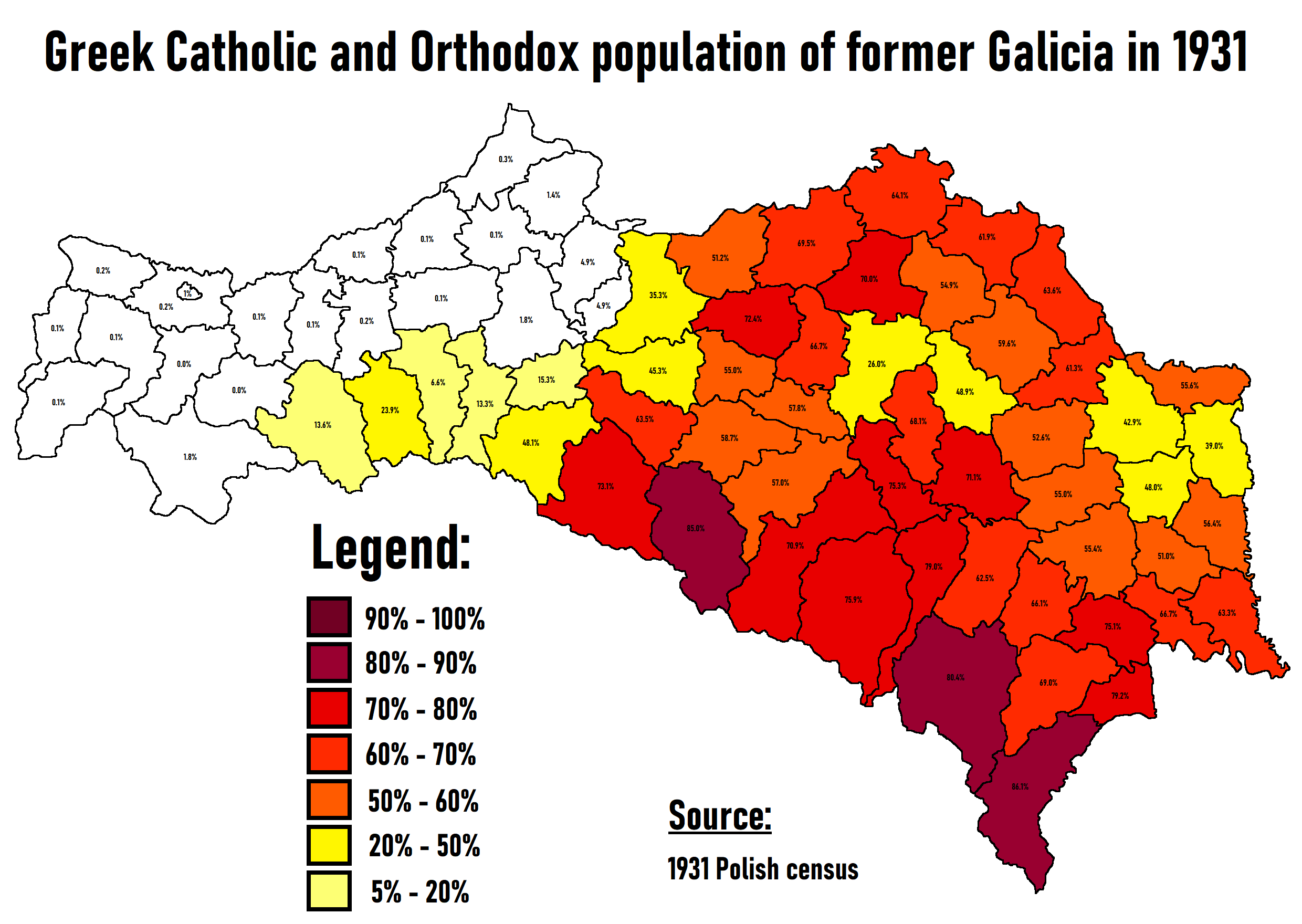
Greek Catholic and Eastern Orthodox population of former Galicia in 1931

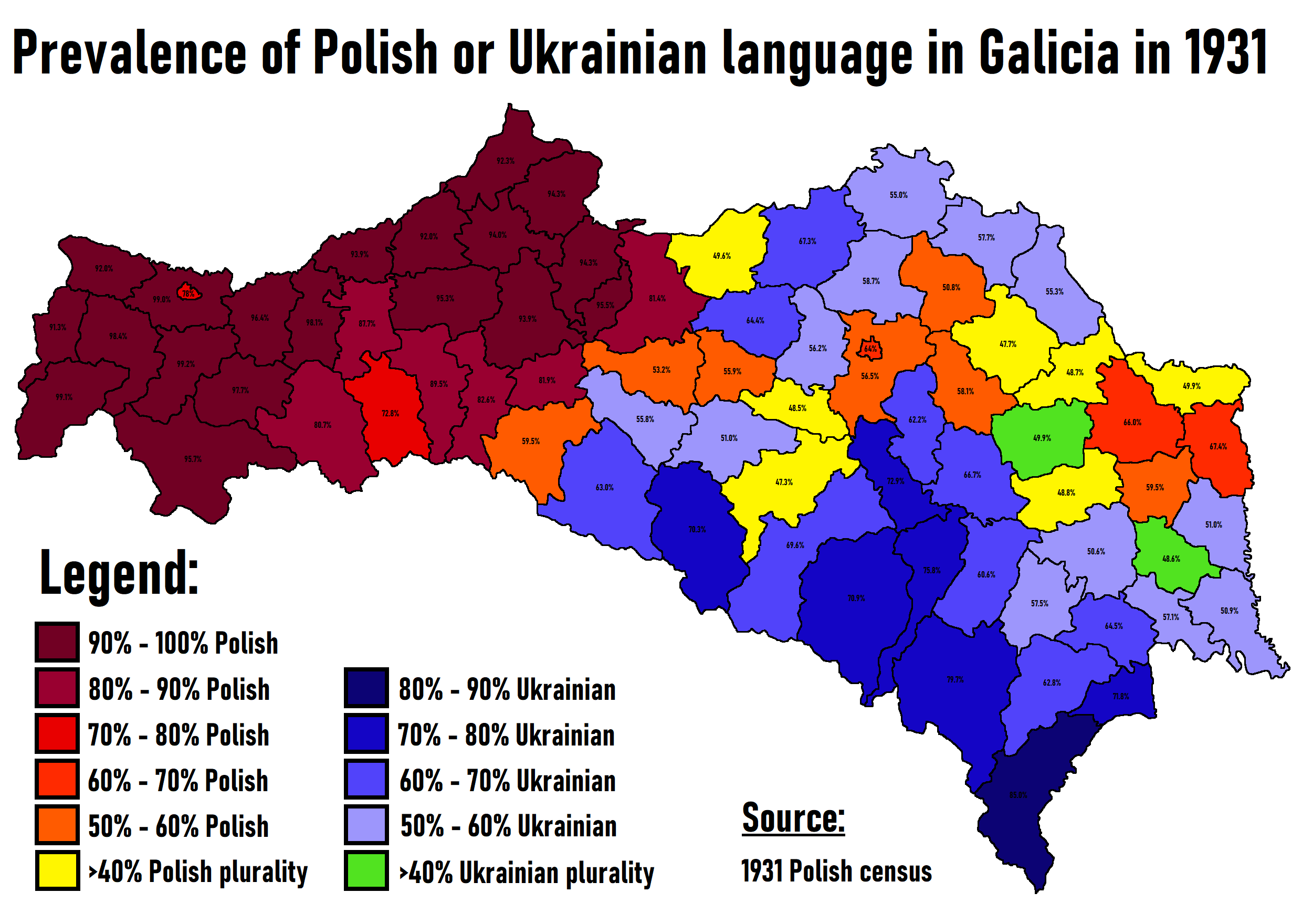
Prevalence of Polish or Ukrainian language in Galicia in 1931

Linguistic and religious structure of former Galicia according to the 1931 Polish census
Today part of	County	Pop.	Polish	%	Yiddish & Hebrew	%	Ukrainian & Ruthenian	%	Other language % (Note: Includes 40,393 German-speakers or around 0.5% of inhabitants of former Galicia.)	Roman Catholic	%	Jewish	%	Uniate & Eastern Orthodox	%	Other religion %
(Ukraine)	Borshchiv	103277	46153	44.7%	4302	4.2%	52612	50.9%	0.2%	28432	27.5%	9353	9.1%	65344	63.3%	0.1%
(Ukraine)	Brody	91248	32843	36.0%	7640	8.4%	50490	55.3%	0.3%	22521	24.7%	10360	11.4%	58009	63.6%	0.4%
(Ukraine)	Berezhany	103824	48168	46.4%	3716	3.6%	51757	49.9%	0.2%	41962	40.4%	7151	6.9%	54611	52.6%	0.1%
(Ukraine)	Buchach	139062	60523	43.5%	8059	5.8%	70336	50.6%	0.1%	51311	36.9%	10568	7.6%	77023	55.4%	0.1%
(Ukraine)	Chortkiv	84008	36486	43.4%	6474	7.7%	40866	48.6%	0.2%	33080	39.4%	7845	9.3%	42828	51.0%	0.3%
(Ukraine)	Kamianka-Buzka	82111	41693	50.8%	4737	5.8%	35178	42.8%	0.6%	29828	36.3%	6700	8.2%	45113	54.9%	0.6%
(Ukraine)	Kopychyntsi	88614	38158	43.1%	5164	5.8%	45196	51.0%	0.1%	31202	35.2%	7291	8.2%	50007	56.4%	0.1%
(Ukraine)	Pidhaitsi	95663	46710	48.8%	3464	3.6%	45031	47.1%	0.5%	38003	39.7%	4786	5.0%	52634	55.0%	0.3%
(Ukraine)	Peremyshliany	89908	52269	58.1%	4445	4.9%	32777	36.5%	0.5%	38475	42.8%	6860	7.6%	44002	48.9%	0.6%
(Ukraine)	Radekhiv	69313	25427	36.7%	3277	4.7%	39970	57.7%	0.9%	17945	25.9%	6934	10.0%	42928	61.9%	2.2%
(Ukraine)	Skalat	89215	60091	67.4%	3654	4.1%	25369	28.4%	0.1%	45631	51.1%	8486	9.5%	34798	39.0%	0.3%
(Ukraine)	Ternopil	142220	93874	66.0%	5836	4.1%	42374	29.8%	0.1%	63286	44.5%	17684	12.4%	60979	42.9%	0.2%
(Ukraine)	Terebovlia	84321	50178	59.5%	3173	3.8%	30868	36.6%	0.1%	38979	46.2%	4845	5.7%	40452	48.0%	0.1%
(Ukraine)	Zalishchyky	72021	27549	38.3%	3261	4.5%	41147	57.1%	0.1%	17917	24.9%	5965	8.3%	48069	66.7%	0.1%
(Ukraine)	Zbarazh	65579	32740	49.9%	3142	4.8%	29609	45.2%	0.1%	24855	37.9%	3997	6.1%	36468	55.6%	0.4%
(Ukraine)	Zboriv	81413	39624	48.7%	2522	3.1%	39174	48.1%	0.1%	26239	32.2%	5056	6.2%	49925	61.3%	0.2%
(Ukraine)	Zolochiv	118609	56628	47.7%	6066	5.1%	55381	46.7%	0.5%	36937	31.1%	10236	8.6%	70663	59.6%	0.7%
(Ukraine)	Dolyna	118373	21158	17.9%	9031	7.6%	83880	70.9%	3.6%	15630	13.2%	10471	8.8%	89811	75.9%	2.1%
(Ukraine)	Horodenka	92894	27751	29.9%	5031	5.4%	59957	64.5%	0.2%	15519	16.7%	7480	8.1%	69789	75.1%	0.1%
(Ukraine)	Kalush	102252	18637	18.2%	5109	5.0%	77506	75.8%	1.0%	14418	14.1%	6249	6.1%	80750	79.0%	0.8%
(Ukraine)	Kolomyia	176000	52006	29.5%	11191	6.4%	110533	62.8%	1.3%	31925	18.1%	20887	11.9%	121376	69.0%	1.0%
(Ukraine)	Kosiv	93952	6718	7.2%	6730	7.2%	79838	85.0%	0.7%	4976	5.3%	7826	8.3%	80903	86.1%	0.3%
(Ukraine)	Nadvírna	140702	16907	12.0%	11020	7.8%	112128	79.7%	0.5%	15214	10.8%	11663	8.3%	113116	80.4%	0.5%
(Ukraine)	Rohatyn	127252	36152	28.4%	6111	4.8%	84875	66.7%	0.1%	27108	21.3%	9466	7.4%	90456	71.1%	0.2%
(Ukraine)	Stanyslaviv	198359	49032	24.7%	26996	13.6%	120214	60.6%	1.1%	42519	21.4%	29525	14.9%	123959	62.5%	1.2%
(Ukraine)	Stryi	152631	25186	16.5%	15413	10.1%	106183	69.6%	3.8%	23404	15.3%	17115	11.2%	108159	70.9%	2.6%
(Ukraine)	Sniatyn	78025	17206	22.1%	4341	5.6%	56007	71.8%	0.6%	8659	11.1%	7073	9.1%	61797	79.2%	0.6%
(Ukraine)	Tlumach	116028	44958	38.7%	3677	3.2%	66659	57.5%	0.6%	31478	27.1%	6702	5.8%	76650	66.1%	1.0%
(Ukraine)	Zhydachiv	83817	16464	19.6%	4728	5.6%	61098	72.9%	1.8%	15094	18.0%	5289	6.3%	63144	75.3%	0.3%
(Ukraine)	Bibrka	97124	30762	31.7%	5533	5.7%	60444	62.2%	0.4%	22820	23.5%	7972	8.2%	66113	68.1%	0.2%
(Ukraine)	Dobromyl	93970	35945	38.3%	4997	5.3%	52463	55.8%	0.6%	25941	27.6%	7522	8.0%	59664	63.5%	0.9%
(Ukraine)	Drohobych	194456	91935	47.3%	20484	10.5%	79214	40.7%	1.5%	52172	26.8%	28888	14.9%	110850	57.0%	1.3%
(Ukraine)	Horodok	85007	33228	39.1%	2975	3.5%	47812	56.2%	1.2%	22408	26.4%	4982	5.9%	56713	66.7%	1.1%
(Ukraine)	Yavoriv	86762	26938	31.0%	3044	3.5%	55868	64.4%	1.1%	18394	21.2%	5161	5.9%	62828	72.4%	0.4%
(Ukraine)	Lviv City	312231	198212	63.5%	75316	24.1%	35137	11.3%	1.1%	157490	50.4%	99595	31.9%	50824	16.3%	1.4%
(Ukraine)	Lviv County	142800	80712	56.5%	1569	1.1%	58395	40.9%	1.5%	67430	47.2%	5087	3.6%	67592	47.3%	1.9%
(Ukraine)	Mostyska	89460	49989	55.9%	2164	2.4%	37196	41.6%	0.1%	34619	38.7%	5428	6.1%	49230	55.0%	0.2%
(Ukraine)	Rava-Ruska	122072	27376	22.4%	10991	9.0%	82133	67.3%	1.3%	22489	18.4%	13381	11.0%	84808	69.5%	1.1%
(Ukraine)	Rudky	79170	38417	48.5%	4247	5.4%	36254	45.8%	0.3%	27674	35.0%	5396	6.8%	45756	57.8%	0.4%
(Ukraine)	Sambir	133814	56818	42.5%	7794	5.8%	68222	51.0%	0.7%	43583	32.6%	11258	8.4%	78527	58.7%	0.3%
(Ukraine)	Sokal	109111	42851	39.3%	5917	5.4%	59984	55.0%	0.3%	25425	23.3%	13372	12.3%	69963	64.1%	0.3%
(Ukraine)	Turka	114457	26083	22.8%	7552	6.6%	80483	70.3%	0.3%	6301	5.5%	10627	9.3%	97339	85.0%	0.2%
(Ukraine)	Zhovkva	95507	35816	37.5%	3344	3.5%	56060	58.7%	0.3%	20279	21.2%	7848	8.2%	66823	70.0%	0.6%
(Poland)	Brzozów	83205	68149	81.9%	3836	4.6%	10677	12.8%	0.7%	65813	79.1%	4316	5.2%	12743	15.3%	0.4%
(Poland)	Jarosław	148028	120429	81.4%	6064	4.1%	20993	14.2%	0.4%	83652	56.5%	11721	7.9%	52302	35.3%	0.2%
(Poland)	Kolbuszowa	69565	65361	94.0%	3693	5.3%	62	0.1%	0.6%	63999	92.0%	5091	7.3%	91	0.1%	0.6%
(Poland)	Krosno	113387	93691	82.6%	4416	3.9%	14666	12.9%	0.5%	91189	80.4%	6521	5.8%	15132	13.3%	0.5%
(Poland)	Lesko	111575	31840	28.5%	8475	7.6%	70346	63.0%	0.8%	18209	16.3%	10916	9.8%	81588	73.1%	0.8%
(Poland)	Lubaczów	87266	43294	49.6%	5485	6.3%	38237	43.8%	0.3%	32994	37.8%	9342	10.7%	44723	51.2%	0.2%
(Poland)	Łańcut	97679	92084	94.3%	2318	2.4%	2690	2.8%	0.6%	86066	88.1%	6281	6.4%	4806	4.9%	0.5%
(Poland)	Nisko	64233	60602	94.3%	3084	4.8%	115	0.2%	0.7%	59069	92.0%	3985	6.2%	925	1.4%	0.4%
(Poland)	Przemyśl	162544	86393	53.2%	15891	9.8%	60005	36.9%	0.2%	67068	41.3%	21424	13.2%	73631	45.3%	0.3%
(Poland)	Przeworsk	61388	58634	95.5%	2144	3.5%	406	0.7%	0.3%	54833	89.3%	3405	5.5%	3042	5.0%	0.2%
(Poland)	Rzeszów	185106	173897	93.9%	9065	4.9%	963	0.5%	0.6%	164050	88.6%	17098	9.2%	3277	1.8%	0.4%
(Poland)	Sanok	114195	67955	59.5%	7354	6.4%	38192	33.4%	0.6%	48968	42.9%	9455	8.3%	54882	48.1%	0.8%
(Poland)	Tarnobrzeg	73297	67624	92.3%	5186	7.1%	93	0.1%	0.5%	65891	89.9%	6333	8.6%	194	0.3%	1.2%
(Poland)	Biała	139127	127089	91.3%	5932	4.3%	48	0.0%	4.4%	126431	90.9%	9951	7.2%	197	0.1%	1.8%
(Poland)	Bochnia	113790	109717	96.4%	3847	3.4%	75	0.1%	0.1%	107399	94.4%	5656	5.0%	134	0.1%	0.5%
(Poland)	Brzesko	102226	100251	98.1%	1894	1.9%	20	0.0%	0.1%	97730	95.6%	4121	4.0%	66	0.1%	0.3%
(Poland)	Chrzanów	138061	127078	92.0%	10435	7.6%	88	0.1%	0.3%	125016	90.6%	12127	8.8%	240	0.2%	0.5%
(Poland)	Dąbrowa	66678	62620	93.9%	4016	6.0%	25	0.0%	0.0%	61584	92.4%	4807	7.2%	36	0.1%	0.4%
(Poland)	Gorlice	104805	76266	72.8%	3508	3.3%	24881	23.7%	0.1%	73788	70.4%	5578	5.3%	25092	23.9%	0.3%
(Poland)	Jasło	116146	103935	89.5%	4608	4.0%	7435	6.4%	0.1%	102213	88.0%	5786	5.0%	7659	6.6%	0.4%
(Poland)	Kraków City	219286	171206	78.1%	45828	20.9%	924	0.4%	0.6%	159372	72.7%	56515	25.8%	1894	0.9%	0.7%
(Poland)	Kraków County	187509	185567	99.0%	1569	0.8%	97	0.1%	0.1%	181836	97.0%	4138	2.2%	309	0.2%	0.7%
(Poland)	Limanowa	87279	85238	97.7%	1951	2.2%	29	0.0%	0.1%	84048	96.3%	2766	3.2%	43	0.0%	0.5%
(Poland)	Mielec	77465	71272	92.0%	5441	7.0%	48	0.1%	0.9%	69737	90.0%	6457	8.3%	72	0.1%	1.5%
(Poland)	Myślenice	102692	101878	99.2%	770	0.7%	16	0.0%	0.0%	99978	97.4%	2189	2.1%	32	0.0%	0.5%
(Poland)	Nowy Sącz	183867	148329	80.7%	10282	5.6%	24252	13.2%	0.5%	141857	77.2%	15135	8.2%	25060	13.6%	1.0%
(Poland)	Nowy Targ	129489	123877	95.7%	2571	2.0%	2156	1.7%	0.7%	121767	94.0%	4853	3.7%	2296	1.8%	0.4%
(Poland)	Ropczyce	110925	105700	95.3%	5101	4.6%	60	0.1%	0.1%	104033	93.8%	6410	5.8%	136	0.1%	0.3%
(Poland)	Tarnów	142365	124817	87.7%	17307	12.2%	102	0.1%	0.1%	120610	84.7%	21219	14.9%	293	0.2%	0.2%
(Poland)	Wadowice	145143	142852	98.4%	2070	1.4%	53	0.0%	0.1%	140469	96.8%	3665	2.5%	125	0.1%	0.6%
(Poland)	Żywiec	130949	129747	99.1%	915	0.7%	19	0.0%	0.2%	127685	97.5%	2245	1.7%	71	0.1%	0.7%
Total former Galicia		8505902	5023763	59.1%	549293	6.5%	2874451	33.8%	0.7%	4326926	50.9%	789886	9.3%	3331884	39.2%	0.7%

== Economy ==
=== Socio-economic statistics ===
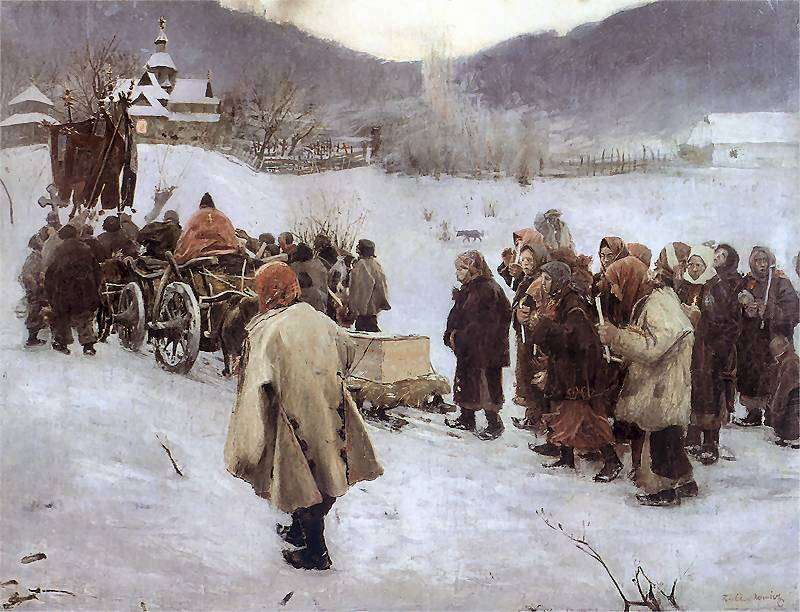
Hutsul Funeral, by Teodor Axentowicz, 1882

Galicia was economically the least developed part of Austria, suffering from under-industrialization and overpopulation. The Austrian government had allowed landowners to maintain old monopolies dating back to the Polish-Lithuanian Commonwealth period, such as the production of beer and vodka. This enabled them to maintain a certain level of wealth, and thus disincentivised the introduction of new crops and the adoption of novel economic pursuits.

The first detailed description of the economic situation of the region was prepared by Stanislaw Szczepanowski (1846–1900), a Polish lawyer, economist and chemist who in 1873 published the first version of his report titled Nędza galicyjska w cyfrach (The Galician Poverty in Numbers). Based on his own experience as a worker in the India Office, as well as his work on the development of the oil industry in the region of Boryslav and the official census data published by the Austro-Hungarian government, he described Galicia as one of the poorest regions in Europe. Several subsequent authors would frame the socio-economic situation in Galicia in a similar negative light, and East Galicia as even less developed than West Galicia. Canadian historian Stella Hryniuk (1985) sought to demonstrate that many of these early observations were flawed due to arbitrary criteria, such as valuing the cultivation of grains over potatoes:

"East Galician yields of wheat, rye, and potatoes regularly exceeded those of West Galicia. Yields of potatoes - a staple of the peasant diet - were often above those of other Austrian crown lands. Having increased until around 1890, there was thereafter a decline in the hectarage devoted to the main grain crops other than maize, but the area under potatoes continued to increase. Contemporaries regarded this trend as indicating increased impoverishment, but we need not do so. Firstly, we do not need to share their attachment to the noble tradition of growing grain. Secondly, given what we know today about its nutritional value, we should not underestimate the potato [...]".

Statistics indicate that Galicia and Lodomeria were poorer than areas west of them. The average income per capita did not exceed 53 Rhine guilders (RG), as compared to 91 RG in the Kingdom of Poland, 100 in Hungary and more than 450 RG in England at that time. Also, the taxes were relatively high and equalled 9 Rhine guilders a year (c. 17% of yearly income), as compared to 5% in Prussia and 10% in England. Also, the percentage of people with higher income was much lower than in other parts of the Monarchy and Europe: the luxury tax, paid by people whose yearly income exceeded 600 RG, was paid by 8 people in every 1,000 inhabitants, as compared to 28 in Bohemia and 99 in Lower Austria. Despite high taxation, the national debt of the Galician government exceeded 300 million RG at all times, that is approximately 60 RG per capita.

All in all, the region was used by the Austro-Hungarian government mostly as a reservoir of cheap workforce and recruits for the army, as well as a buffer zone against the Russian Empire. It was not until early in the 20th century that heavy industry started to be developed, which would be comparable to much of the Russian Empire and the Balkans. Even then, it was mostly connected to war production. The biggest state investments in the region were the railways and the fortresses in Przemyśl, Kraków and other cities. Industrial development was mostly connected to the private oil industry started by Robert Doms and to the Wieliczka salt mines, operational since at least the Middle Ages.

=== The Great Economic Emigration ===
Beginning in the 1880s, a mass emigration of the Galician peasantry occurred. The emigration started as a seasonal one to Germany (newly unified and economically dynamic) and then later became a Trans-Atlantic one with large-scale emigration to the United States, Brazil, and Canada.

Caused by the backward economic condition of Galicia, where rural poverty was widespread, the emigration began in the western, Polish populated part of Galicia and quickly shifted east to the Ukrainian inhabited parts. Poles, Ukrainians, Jews, and Germans all participated in this mass movement of countryfolk and villagers. Poles migrated principally to New England and the midwestern states of the United States, but also to Brazil and elsewhere; Ruthenians/Ukrainians migrated to Brazil, Canada, and the United States, with a very intense emigration from Western Podolia around Ternopol to Western Canada; and Jews emigrated both directly to the New World and also indirectly via other parts of Austria-Hungary. The vast majority of the Ukrainians and Poles who went to Canada prior to 1914 came from either Galicia or the neighboring Bukovina province of the Austrian Empire. In 1847, 1849, 1855, 1865, 1876 and 1889, there were famines in Galicia that led to thousands starving to death, which increased the sense that life in Galicia was hopeless and inspired people to leave in search of a better life in the New World. Adding to the exodus were the inheritance laws in Galicia adopted in 1868 which stated that the land should be equally divided amongst the sons of a peasant, which — owing to the tendency of Galician peasants to have large families — led to the land being divided into so many small holdings as to make farming uneconomical.

A total of several hundred thousand people were involved in this Great Economic Emigration, which grew steadily more intense until the outbreak of the First World War in 1914. The war put a temporary halt to emigration, which never again reached the same proportions. The Great Economic Emigration, especially the emigration to Brazil, the "Brazilian Fever" as it was called at the time, was described in contemporary literary works by the Polish poet Maria Konopnicka, the Ukrainian writer Ivan Franko, and many others. Some states in south of Brazil have a large percentage of their population formed by direct descendants of these Ruthenian/Ukrainian immigrants.

When it comes to social relations, most especially between peasants and landlords, the area was the most undeveloped in the former Polish–Lithuanian Commonwealth. The Galician peasantry was always living on the verge of starvation. This led the Polish peasants to ironically refer to the province as "Golicja i Głodomeria" i.e "(the place of) Bareness and Starvation". Tsar Alexander II had officially banned serfdom and liberated the serfs in the Russian Empire in the 1870s and enacted legislation to protect the serfs. But in Galicia, the serfs could be coerced or forced through predatory practices back into serfdom by the affluent Polish merchant class and local nobility, a condition which lasted until the start of World War I.

At the time of these emigrations in the 1890s, many Polish and Ukrainian liberals saw Galicia as a Polish Piedmont or a Ukrainian Piedmont. Because Italians had started their liberation from Austrian rule in the Italian Piedmont, these Ukrainian and Polish nationalists felt that the liberation of their two countries would begin in Galicia.

In spite of almost 750,000 persons emigrating across the Atlantic from 1880 to 1914, Galicia's population increased by 45% between 1869 and 1910.

=== Industry ===
In 1880, industry in Galicia was at a low level. In 1857, Galicia had 102,189 persons or 2.2% of the population, who worked in industry. By 1870, that number had risen to 179,626, or 3.3% of the population.

Coal mining and oil production were the region's chief industrial activities.

=== Oil and natural gas industry ===
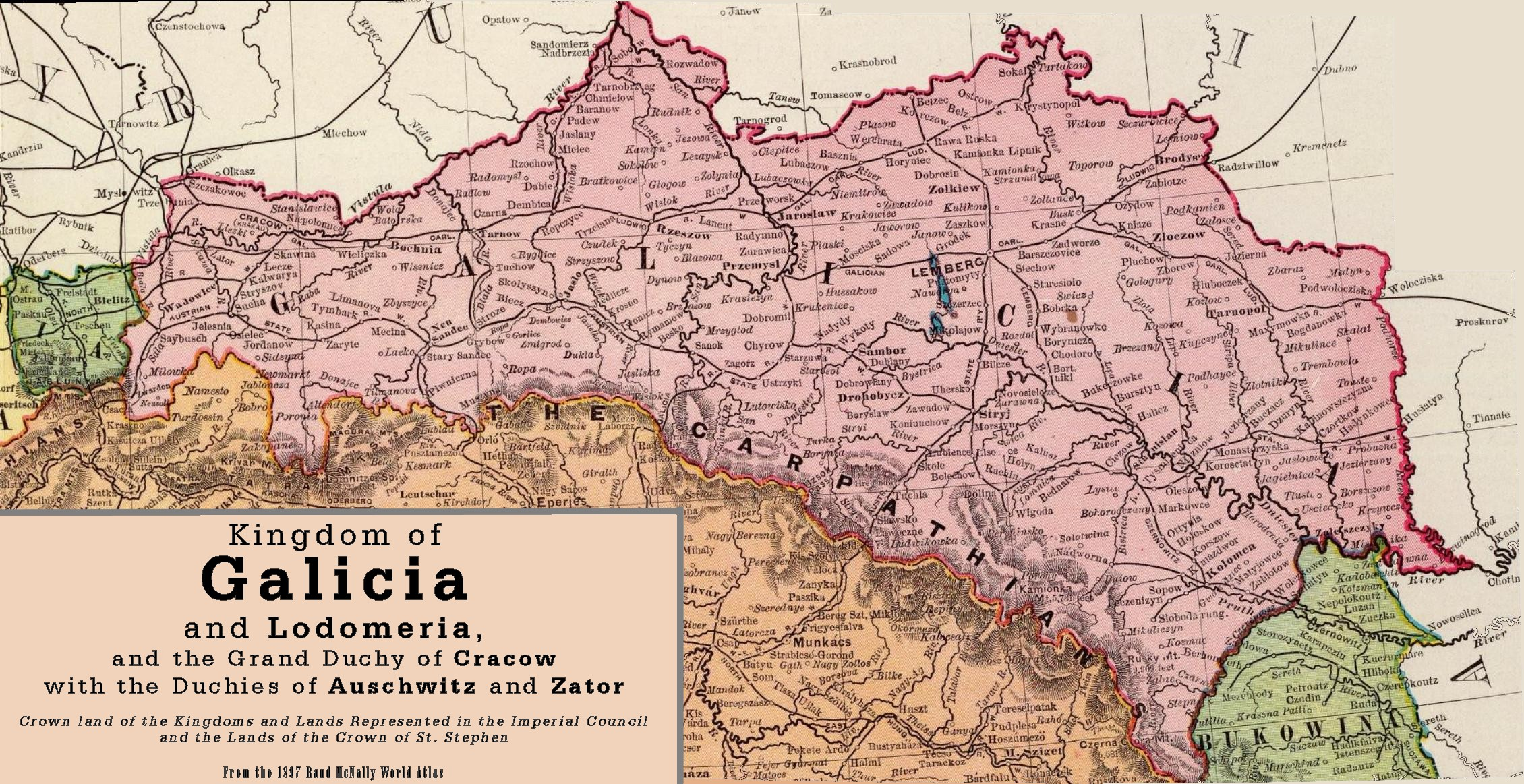
Rail lines of Galicia before 1897

Near Drohobych and Boryslav in Galicia, significant oil reserves were discovered and developed during the mid 19th and early 20th centuries. The first European attempt to drill for oil was in Bóbrka in western Galicia in 1854. By 1867, a well at Kleczany, in Western Galicia, was drilled using steam to about 200 meters. On 31 December 1872, a railway line linking Borysław (now Boryslav) with the nearby city of Drohobycz (now Drohobych) was opened. American John Simon Bergheim and Canadian William Henry McGarvey came to Galicia in 1882. (Note: William McGarvey helped develop a rig in the 1860s or 1870s which made his Canadian drilling technology and Canadian drillers famous around the world. John Simon Bergheim and William Henry McGarvey had unsuccessfully searched for oil in Germany under the Continental Oil Company, of which McGarvey was the director. They left Germany and began their first drilling in Galicia during 1882 under the company name of MacGarvey and Bergheim.) In 1883, their company, McGarvey and Bergheim, bored holes of 700 to 1,000 meters and found large oil deposits. In 1885, they renamed their oil developing enterprise the Galician-Karpathian Petroleum Company (German: Galizisch-Karpathische Petroleum Aktien-Gesellschaft), headquartered in Vienna, with McGarvey as the chief administrator and Bergheim as field engineer, (Note: Just after the turn of the century, Bergheim was killed in a taxicab accident in London, England, leaving McGarvey to carry on alone.) and built a huge refinery at Maryampole near Gorlice, in the southeast corner of Galicia. Considered the biggest, most efficient enterprise in Austro-Hungary, Maryampole was built in six months and employed 1000 men. (Note: Later, Bergheim and McGarvey bought a number of small oil-producing and refining operations and acquired the Apollo Oil Company of Budapest.) Subsequently, investors from Britain, Belgium, and Germany established companies to develop the oil and natural gas industries in Galicia. This influx of capital caused the number of petroleum enterprises to shrink from 900 to 484 by 1884, and to 285 companies manned by 3,700 workers by 1890. However, the number of oil refineries increased from 31 in 1880 to 54 in 1904. By 1904, there were 30 boreholes in Borysław of over 1,000 meters. Production increased by 50% between 1905 and 1906 and then trebled between 1906 and 1909 because of unexpected discoveries of vast oil reserves, of which many were gushers. By 1909, production reached its peak at 2,076,000 tons or 4% of worldwide production. Often called the "Polish Baku", the oil fields of Borysław and nearby Tustanowice accounted for over 90% of the national oil output of the Austria-Hungary Empire. From 500 residents in the 1860s, Borysław had swollen to 12,000 by 1898. In 1909, Polmin with headquarters in Lviv was established for the extraction and distribution of natural gas. At the turn of the century, Galicia was ranked fourth in the world as an oil producer. (Note: In 1909, the first in the world for oil production was the United States with 183,171,000 barrels, the Russian Empire was second with 65,970,000 barrels, and the Austria-Hungary Empire was third with 14,933,000 barrels per year due to its significant oil reserves discoveries between 1905 and 1909.) This significant increase in oil production also caused a slump in oil prices. A very rapid decrease in oil production in Galicia occurred just before the Balkans conflicts.

Galicia was the Central Powers' only major domestic source of oil during World War I.

== Culture ==
- Newspapers: Gazette de Leopol (1776), Slovo (closed in 1876 due to Ems Ukaze)
- Weekly: Zoria Halytska (first issue on 15 May 1848)

== Flag ==
Until 1849, Galicia and Lodomeria was a single province with Bukovina and used the blue-red flag (consisting of two horizontal stripes: the upper one was blue, the lower one was red).

In 1849, Bukovina was given an independent status from that of Galicia-Lodomeria and kept the blue-red flag. Galicia was given a new flag consisting of three horizontal stripes, being blue, red and yellow.

That flag remained in use until 1890, when Galicia-Lodomeria received a new flag consisting of two horizontal stripes being red and white. It remained in use until the dissolution of the Kingdom of Galicia-Lodomeria in 1918 and is displayed in Ströhl's Oesterreichisch-ungarische Wappenrolle (1898).

1772–1800, 1849–1890

1800–1849, 1890-1918

References

- Jan Miller: Chorągwie i flagi polskie, Instytut Wydawniczy "Nasza Księgarnia", Warsaw 1962,
- Hugo Ströhl: Oesterreichisch-ungarische Wappenrolle, Vienna 1898

== Military ==
The Kingdom was divided into three major military districts centered in Kraków, Lviv, and Przemyśl. Local military used a specialized language for communication known as Army Slav. One of the major army units was the 1st Army, consisting of 1st (Kraków), 5th (Pressburg), and 10th (Przemyśl) Corps.

=== Selected units (1914); command language German ===
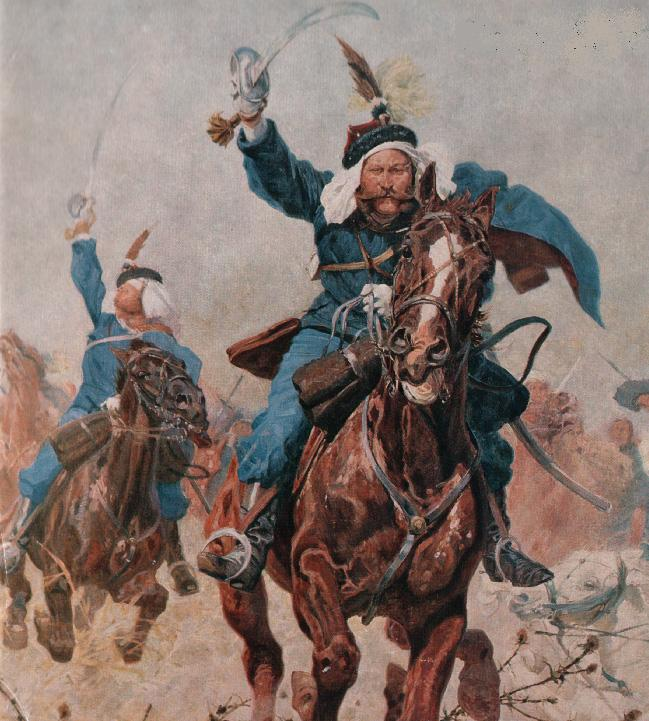
The 13th Galicia Lancer Regiment at the Battle of Custoza

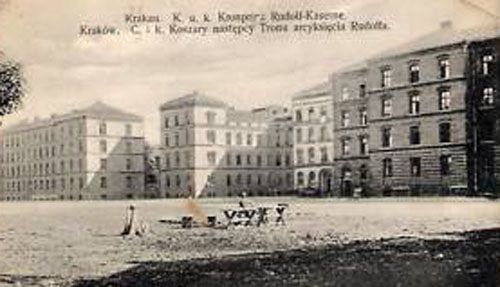
Rudolf Barracks in Kraków

Eight out of 11 Imperial and Royal Uhlan regiments were located in Galicia (see Uhlan)

Regiment	% of Poles	% of Ukrainians	Regimental language(s)
1st Galician Uhlans (Ritter von Brudermann's)	85		Polish
2nd Galician Uhlans (Prince of Schwarzenberg's)	84		Polish
3rd Galician Uhlans (Archduke Carl's)	69	26	Polish
4th Galician Uhlans (Emperor's)	29	65	Polish and Ukrainian
6th Galician Uhlans (Emperor Joseph II's)	52	40	Polish and Ukrainian
7th Galician Uhlans (Archduke Franz Ferdinand's)	22	72	Ukrainian
8th Galician Uhlans (Count Auersperg's)	80		Polish
13th Galician Uhlans (von Böhm-Ermolli's)	42	55	Polish and Ukrainian

One Imperial and Royal Dragoon regiment

Regiment	Ethnic composition	Regimental language(s)
9th Galician and Bukovina Dragoons (Archduke Albert's Own)	50% Romanians, 29% Ukrainians	Romanian and Ukrainian

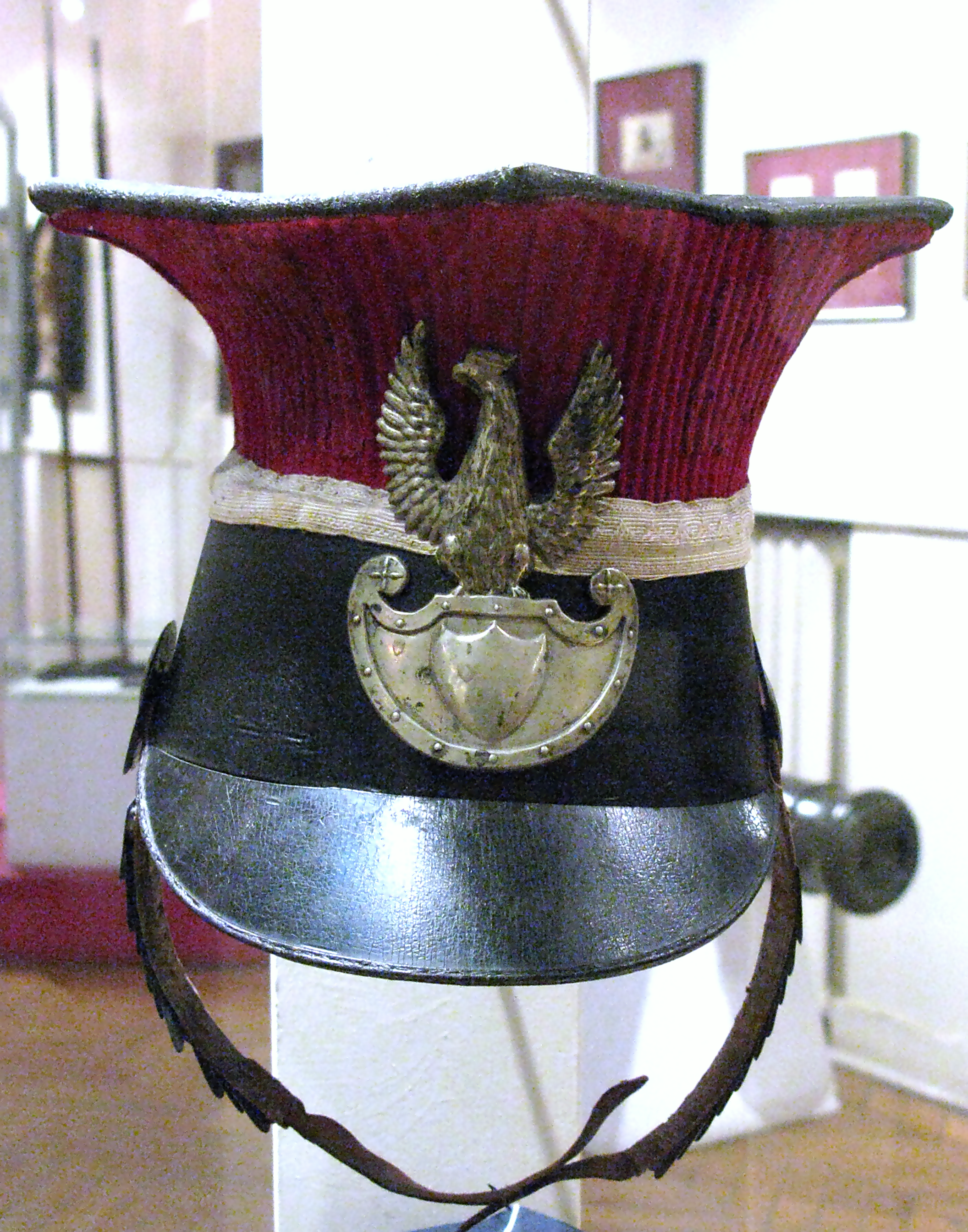
Shako of the Polish National Guard in Lviv in 1848

10 Imperial and Royal Infantry regiments

Infantry Regiment	% of Poles	% of Ukrainians	Garrison
9th		73	Stryi
10th	43	47	Przemyśl
13th	82		Krakau
24th	21	70	Kolomea
30th	31	59	Lemberg
40th	97		Rzeszów
57th	91		Tarnów
58th		80	Stanislau
80th	25	68	Zolochiv
90th	75		Jarosław

Two Artillery divisions:

- 43rd Field Artillery Division (55% Ukrainians, 25% Poles), Lemberg
- 45th Field Artillery Division (60% Ukrainians, 25% Poles), Przemyśl

Five Feldjäger battalions (Military Police):

- 4th Galicia Feldjäger Battalion (77% Poles), Braunau am Inn (Rzeszow district)
- 12th Bohemia Feldjäger Battalion (67% Czech, 32% German), Cavalese (Kraków district)
- 14th Feldjäger Battalion (47% Ukrainians, 43% Poles), Mezzolombardo (Przemyśl district)
- 18th Feldjäger Battalion (59% Ukrainians, 31% Poles), Trient (Lviv district)
- 30th Galicia-Bukowina Feldjäger Battalion (70% Ukrainians), Steyr (Stanislav district)

=== Others ===
- 10th Engineer Battalion (50% Poles, 30% Ukrainians) (Przemyśl)
- 1st Sapper Battalion (50% Poles, 23% Germans, 23% Czechs) (Krakau)
- 10th Sapper Battalion (50% Poles, 30% Ukrainians) (Przemyśl)
- 11th Sapper Battalion (48% Ukrainians, 32% Poles) (Lemberg)
- Polish Legions
- Ukrainian Legions, later as part of the battle group of Archduke Wilhelm
- 1st Ukrainian Cossack Rifle Division (1918)

== The memory of Galicia ==
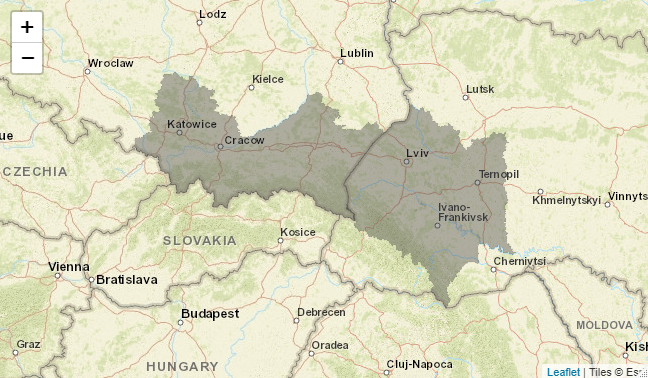
Modern Polish Voivodeships (Silesian, Lesser Poland and Subcarpathian) and Ukrainian Oblasts (Lviv, Ternopil and Ivano-Frankivsk) which contain parts of the former kingdom.

In 2014, the Polish historian Jacek Purchla stated that there were two ways of remembering Galicia, namely as an idyllically innocent multi-cultural land, of a simpler and better time compared to the present vs. the Austrian view of Galicia as a Halb-Asien ("half-Asia") as Austrian officials always regarded Galicia as "a barbaric place inhabited by strange people of questionable personal hygiene". Galicia was always considered in Vienna to be a colony in need of being "civilized", and as a result, the Austrians never considered Galicia to be a part of Austria proper. Both the Polish and Ukrainian communities of Galicia saw the province as their "Piedmont" where plans for an independent Polish or Ukrainian state were broached, making the memory of Galicia under Austrian rule a central part of Polish and Ukrainian national memories. In 2014, Purchla stated: "The latest proof of the political significance of the Galician heritage has been the contribution of its Ukrainian parts to the success of the Maidan [revolution] this year and last year". Starting in the late 19th century, about 2 million Galician Jews immigrated to the United States, and amongst the descendants of the Galitzianer in the United States, the memory of Galicia as either a lost paradise or as a backward province to escape from is kept alive. The Economist reported: "In Europe, Galicia is a central element of Poles' national identity and of Ukrainians' search for a European identity."

== See also ==
- Ruthenian nobility of Galicia
- Bukovina
- Duchy of Bukovina
- Kingdom of Galicia–Volhynia
- Galician Soviet Socialist Republic
- Lesser Poland
- Galician Peasant Uprising of 1846
- List of towns of the former Kingdom of Galicia and Lodomeria

== Bibliography ==
- Font, Márta (2023). "The Title rex Galiciae between Ambitions and Reality (c. 1100–r. 1400)". Unions and Divisions: New Forms of Rule in Medieval and Renaissance Europe. New York: Routledge. pp. 107–118.
- Hryniuk, Stella (1985). "Peasant Agriculture in East Galicia in the Late Nineteenth Century". The Slavonic and East European Review. 63 (2). Modern Humanities Research Association: 228–243. ISSN 0037-6795. JSTOR 4209083.
- Magocsi, Paul R. (1983). Galicia: A Historical Survey and Bibliographic Guide. Toronto: University of Toronto Press. ISBN 978-0-8020-2482-4.
- Magocsi, Paul R. (1996). A History of Ukraine (1. ed.). Toronto: University of Toronto Press.
- Prazmowska, Anita (2011). A History of Poland (2. ed.). Palgrave Macmillan. ISBN 9780230252363.
- Wolff, Larry (2004). "Inventing Galicia: Messianic Josephinism and the Recasting of Partitioned Poland". Slavic Review. 63 (4): 818–840. doi:10.2307/1520422. JSTOR 1520422. S2CID 155170075.
- Wolff, Larry (2008). "Kennst du das Land? The Uncertainty of Galicia in the Age of Metternich and Fredro". Slavic Review. 67 (2): 277–300. doi:10.1017/S0037677900023536. JSTOR 27652844. S2CID 164814456.
- Wolff, Larry (2010). The Idea of Galicia: History and Fantasy in Habsburg Political Culture. Stanford: Stanford University Press. ISBN 978-0-8047-7429-1.
