= Common Army =

Part of the Austro-Hungarian land forces (1867–1914)

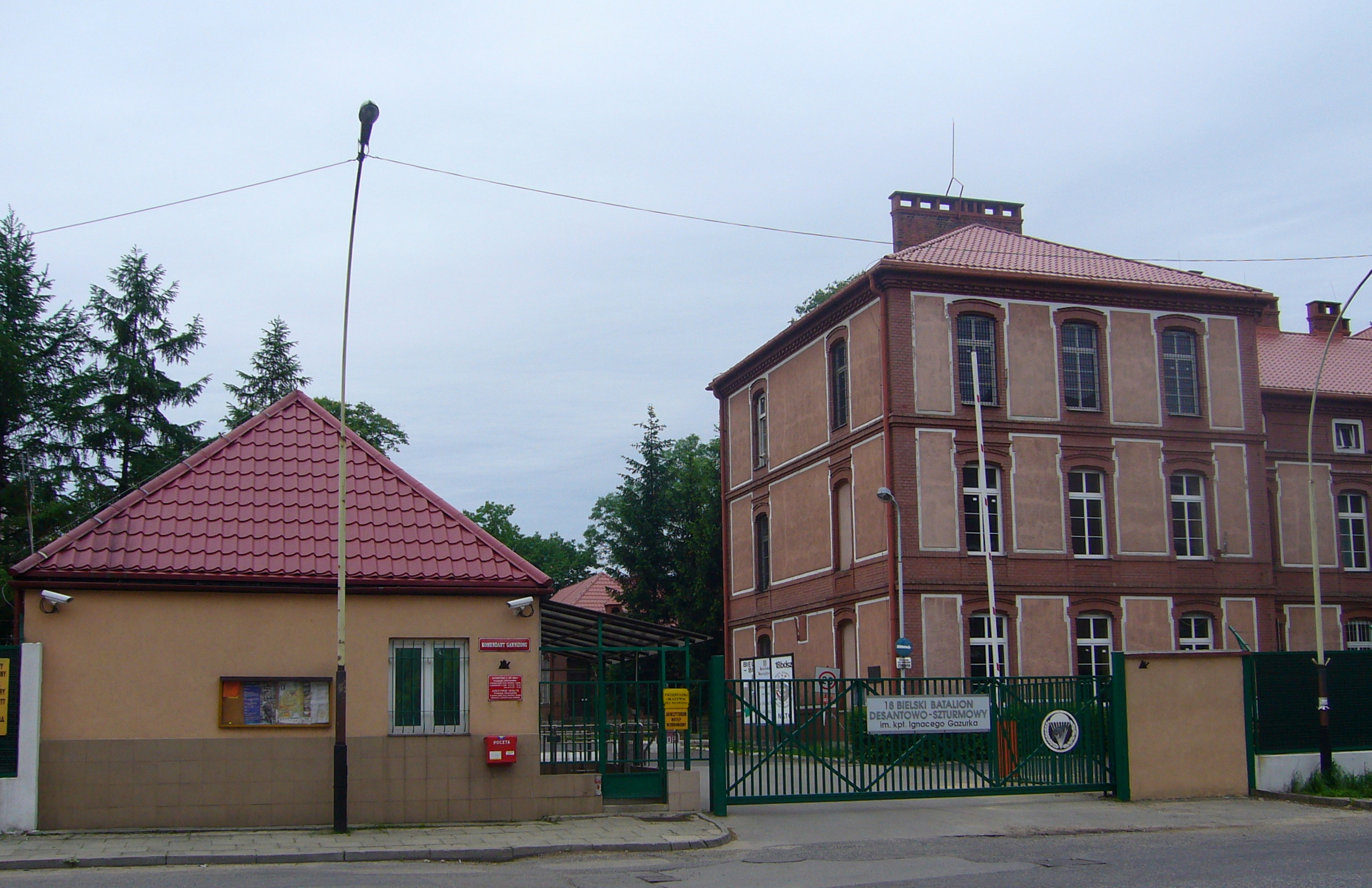
The barracks of the 3rd Uhlans in Bielitz (now Bielsko-Biała) is still used today by the Polish Armed Forces.

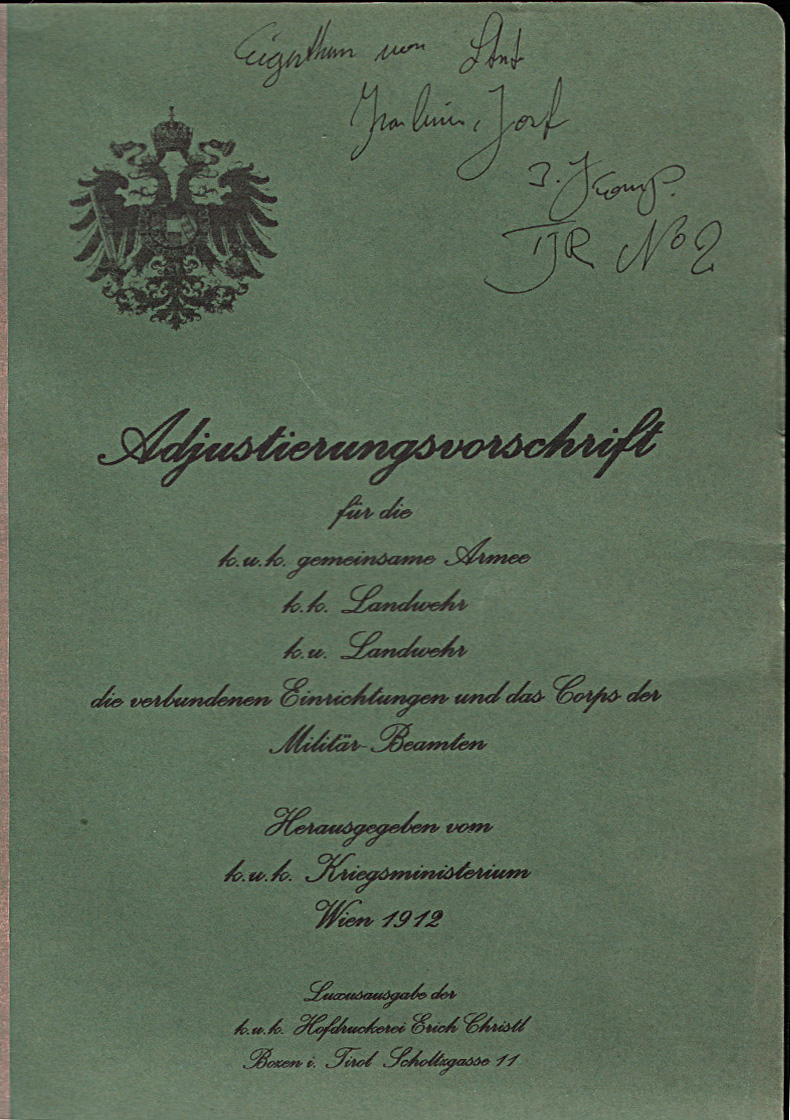
1867 uniform regulation (1911/12 edition).

The Common Army (German: Gemeinsame Armee, Hungarian: Közös Hadsereg), as it was officially designated by the Imperial and Royal Military Administration, was the largest part of the Austro-Hungarian land forces from 1867 to 1914, the other two elements being the Imperial-Royal Landwehr (of Austria) and the Royal Hungarian Honvéd. However, it was simply known as the Army (Heer) by the Emperor and in peacetime laws, and, after 1918, colloquially called the k.u.k. Armee (short for Imperial and Royal Army).

Established on 15 March 1867 and effectively disbanded on 31 October 1918 when its Hungarian troops left, the Common Army formed the main element of the "armed power" (Bewaffneten Macht or Wehrmacht) of the new dual monarchy, to which the Imperial and Royal Navy (k.u.k. Kriegsmarine) also belonged. In the First World War all land and sea forces of the monarchy were subordinated to the Armeeoberkommando set up in 1914.

== History ==
=== Origin of the name ===
Until 1889 the armed forces bore the title "k.k." (kaiserlich-königlich i.e. "Imperial-Royal", which was technically incorrect after 1867 for a common institution of both Austrian and Hungarian halves of the Empire), as they had done before 1867. Only on the express wish of the Kingdom of Hungary was the designation "k.u.k." and "cs. és kir." (German: "kaiserlich und königlich", Hungarian: "császári és királyi", i.e. "Imperial and Royal") introduced in order to make the distinction clearer between the new Austrian army, the k.k. Landwehr, and the new Hungarian force, the m. kir. Honvédség. The navy did not use "k.u.k." as often, because there were few other naval forces apart from the main navy.

=== Common institution ===
After the Austro-Hungarian Compromise of 15 March 1867 the army and navy were no longer institutions of a single state, but of the new double monarchy, which was composed of two countries on an equal footing: the Empire of Austria (Cisleithania) and the no longer subordinate Kingdom of Hungary (Transleithania); the two being joined together in a real union.

From that point on, Emperor Franz Joseph—hitherto the "Emperor of Austria, King of Hungary, Bohemia, Croatia, Dalmatia, Galicia, etc."—bore the title Emperor of Austria and King of Hungary, etc. Overall command still lay with the monarch who communicated with the army through the newly established Military Chancellery of His Majesty the Emperor and King. The Imperial and Royal War Ministry (k.u.k. Kriegsministerium - called the Reichskriegsministerium until 1911) was responsible for the administration and maintenance of the Army (and Navy) structure; its associated General Staff being responsible for strategy. Its Chief of the General Staff had the right to address the monarch directly.

=== Main element of the armed forces ===
The Austrian act of 11 April 1889 (a law with identical content was passed in Hungary), which superseded the defence act of 1868, amended in 1882, stated clearly in section 2 that:

The armed forces are divided into the Army, the Navy, the Landwehr and the Landsturm.

In section 14 the annual recruiting quota for the Army and Navy was set at 103,000; of which 60,389 had to come from the "kingdoms and lands represented in the Reichsrat". The recruiting target for Austrian Landwehr army raised for territorial defence was 10,000 men. The quotas were to be adjusted to meet requirements every ten years by political agreement between Austria and Hungary and by associated laws. The Austrian Landwehr and the Hungarian Royal Hungarian Honvéd were not subordinate to the Minister of War, but to the Imperial and Royal Minister for Defence (Landwehrminister) and his Royal Hungarian counterpart, unofficially called the Honvéd Minister.

=== Funding ===
In all matters of joint concern, including the Common Army, there was a fixed cost-sharing between the two parts of the Empire. From 1867 onwards, Hungary bore 30% of the total cost. This figure was increased in the Compromise negotiations in 1888 to 31.4% and in 1907 to 36.4%. The total cost of the Army, Landwehr and Navy in 1912 was around 670 million krones. That was less than 3.5% of the entire national income, in 1906 it was only 2.5%. In Russia, Italy and Germany the cost in 1912 was about 5% of the net national product. Austria-Hungary remained the great power with the lowest expenditure on its armed forces.

=== Neglect and factional interests ===
In the long period of peace during the final decades of the 19th century, the army and navy were increasingly neglected. Military expenditure was not popular in either the Austrian Reichsrat or Hungarian Diet, at least for their common forces. The much-needed modernization of the army was delayed again and again. This was to cause problems with mobilization in 1914. (The Mountain Troops of the Imperial-Royal Landwehr were, however, an exception and very well equipped.)

Hungarian politicians repeatedly demanded a separate Hungarian army. The monarch agreed a compromise in the 1867 accord: the two halves of the empire should be allowed their own territorial forces in addition to the common army. Hungary immediately began to establish the Royal Hungarian Landwehr, usually called the Honvéd, even in German.

But Emperor and King Franz Joseph I mainly focused on the unity of the Army and Navy enshrined in the Compromise, and reinforced this in 1903 after further attempts by Hungary in his army order of Chlopy (a training area in Galicia):

True to their oath, all My armed forces are progressing down the path of serious fulfillment of their duty, imbued with that spirit of unity and harmony, which each national character respects and before which all opposition melts, by exploiting the individual attributes of each people for the sake of the greater whole . [...]. Jointly and united, as it is, must My army remain.

=== Franz Ferdinand's reforms ===
In 1898, when Archduke and heir to the throne, Franz Ferdinand, was entrusted by the Emperor with an analysis of the armed forces of the monarchy, the overdue need to rejuvenate its rather elderly General Staff quickly became apparent to him. The 76-year-old Emperor agreed in 1906 to Franz Ferdinand's proposal to replace the chief of staff, Friedrich von Beck-Rzikowsky, also 76 years old, by 54-year-old Franz Conrad von Hötzendorf, and the heir immediately tasked Conrad with modernizing structures and processes.

The 65-year-old minister of war, Heinrich von Pitreich, was also replaced in 1906 at Franz Ferdinand's request. The investment proposals of the heir were implemented for political reasons but only to a small extent; in World War I, the Austro-Hungarian army was far less well-equipped than the armed forces of the confederated German Empire.

=== Wartime ===
From 1867 to 1914, Austria-Hungary's land forces only had to deal with one emergency: the occupation campaign in Bosnia and Herzegovina after the Congress of Berlin approved its military occupation in 1878. The deployment was needed in order to overcome armed resistance. In 1908, part of the common army mobilized to deter Serbia in the Bosnian Crisis.

After the assassination of Franz Ferdinand, in the summer of 1914 the 84-year-old Emperor appointed Archduke Friedrich as the Army's Commander-in-Chief, as he himself had no longer wanted to hold this role in wartime since 1859. By agreement, Friedrich left all operational decisions to his Chief of the General Staff, Conrad. After his accession in November 1916, Charles I took over personal command of the armed forces again.

== Organisation ==
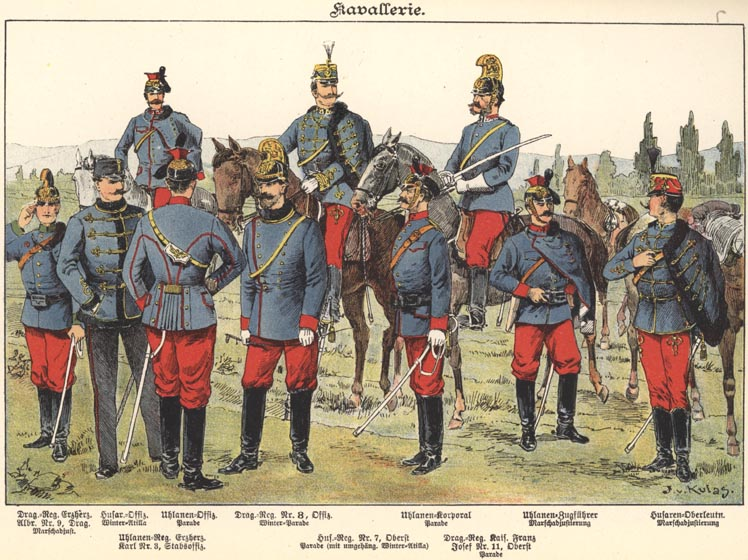
Imperial and Royal Cavalry around 1900

Besides the Common Army there were also the:

- Imperial and Royal Navy
- Royal Hungarian Landwehr (Magyar Király Honvédség) or Honvéd
- Imperial-Royal Landwehr (in Cisleithania)

The Common Army and the Navy were run by the Imperial Minister of War (Reichskriegsminister), later, from 20 September 1911, the Imperial and Royal Minister of War, in Vienna, who was immediately subordinated to the Emperor and King. The two Landwehrs were run by the State Defence Minister of the Imperial-Royal Government in Vienna and his counterpart in the Royal Hungarian government in Budapest.

In 1915 all the supplementary and honorific names in regimental titles were officially dropped and they were henceforth only to be referred to by their numbers. In practice this did not happen; firstly, because no-one bothered to do so and, secondly, because the very frugal Imperial and Royal military administration had ordered that all existing stamps and headed letters had to be exhausted first.

=== Recruiting and garrisoning ===
Unlike the k.k. Landwehr and k.u. Landwehr, the Common Army and the Navy (the majority of the Navy's crews admittedly came from the region around Trieste and the rest of the littoral - and most of the Navy spoke Italian) recruited their soldiers from across the dual monarchy, i.e. from both the Cisleithanian and the Transleithanian halves of the Empire. All military elements that did not come from the Kingdom of Hungary (including Upper Hungary, Transylvania and Banat) or from Croatia and Slavonia (that were part of the Lands of the Hungarian Crown) were designated as "German regiments", regardless of whether they were made up of Poles, Croats or Italian-speaking Tyrolese. All the rest were designated as "Hungarian regiments". German and Hungarian regiments differed from one another in their dress, but their designation as "German" or "Hungarian" was no indication of the languages used within those units (see section on languages).

- 57 infantry regiments were called "German" regiments
- 45 infantry regiments were called "Hungarian" regiments.
- 4 infantry regiments (of Bosnian-Herzegovinian Infantry) had a special status both in terms of uniform and language.
- The rifle (Jäger) battalions belonging to infantry regiments were organized according to the same system
- Artillery, sappers, logistic train and cavalry were also mostly organized along national lines, but lacked any descriptive additions to their unit names. But it was known that all Hussars came from the lands of the Hungarian crown (with Hungarian, Slovak, Romanian, Croatian and German as their native language), the Uhlans from Galicia (speaking Polish and Ukrainian) and the Dragoons from the German-Austrian crown lands, Bohemia and Moravia (speaking Czech and German).

The "armed power" (Army, Navy, Landwehr, Honvéd) was under the command of the Emperor and King in his capacity as "the supreme warlord" (allerhöchster Kriegsherr). This title was primarily of formal significance because, after the hapless campaign led by Emperor Franz Joseph I in 1859 in Italy, the monarch had retired from active military command and the actual command from then on in peacetime, was exercised by the War Ministry in Vienna and, in the First World War, by Commander-in-Chief Archduke Friedrich - only appointed for the war - and his Chief of General Staff, Franz Conrad von Hötzendorf. On 2 December 1916 Emperor Charles I again took personal command. Franz Joseph I had never made special visits to the troops, but had made contact with local regiments on his journeys around the Monarchy and had participated in the annual "imperial exercises" (Kaisermanövern) until he was very old. In addition, he always turned out in his field marshal's uniform, when not abroad, in order to testify to the link with his soldiers. The 30-year-old Emperor Charles I, who succeeded to the throne in the middle of the war, took the term commander very seriously and tirelessly visited the front and his troops.

A feature of the Common Army was the frequent changes of troop locations during the early first decades. The battalions of individual regiments were moved at very short intervals to other locations (in 1910 only three infantry regiments of the Common Army were based entirely in one garrison: the 14th Infantry at Linz, the 30th Infantry at Lemberg and the 41st Infantry at Chernowitz). As a result, the traditional relationship between a regiment and a specific place and local population could not be formed (as was promoted, for example, everywhere in the various armies of the German Empire). Troops were often stationed at the other end of the Empire, so that, in the event of civil disturbance, they would not fraternize with the local population. But their widespread distribution was also the result of a lack of barracks. This went so far that even individual companies had to be separated from their battalions and housed independently. After greater efforts had been made, in the years before the First World War, to build new barracks and renovate existing ones, this practice reduced markedly.

=== Armament ===
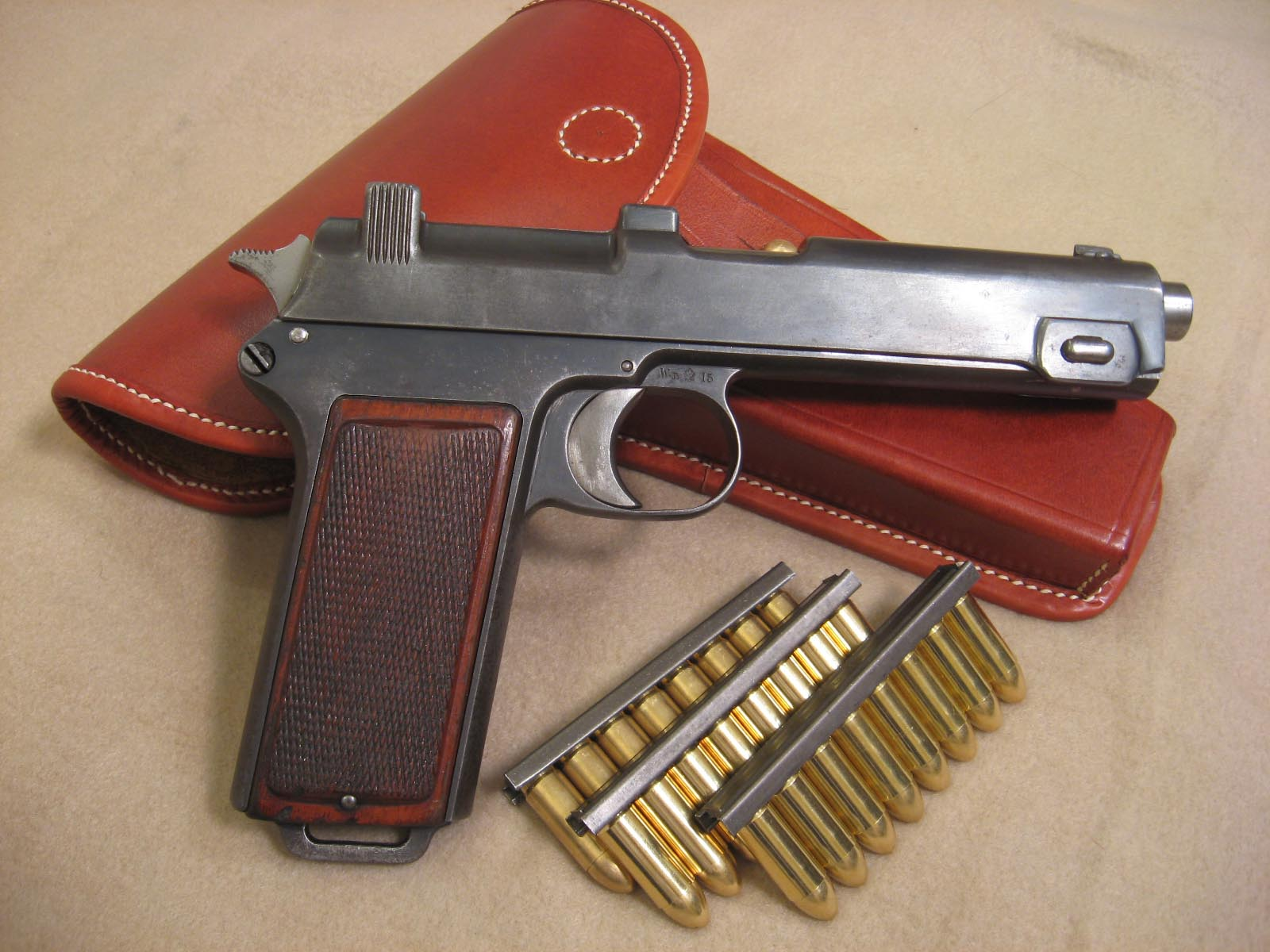
Steyr M1912

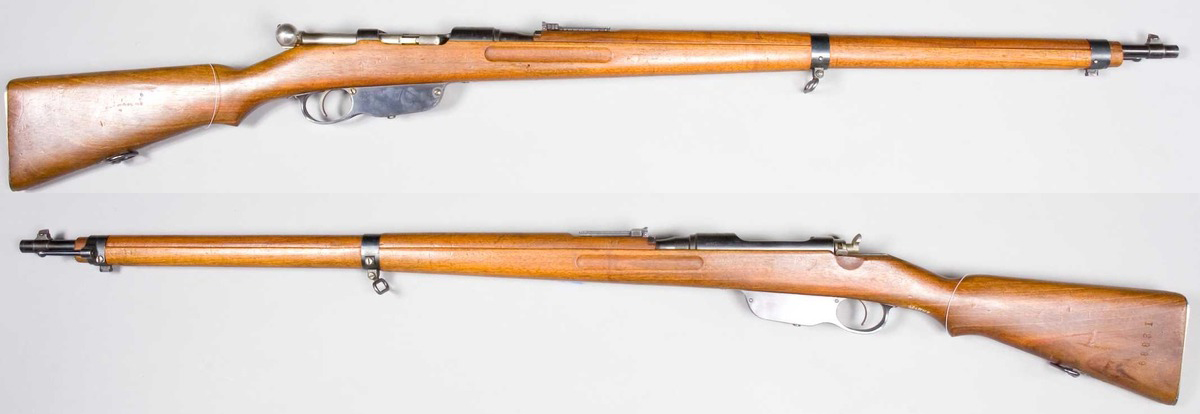
Mannlicher M1895

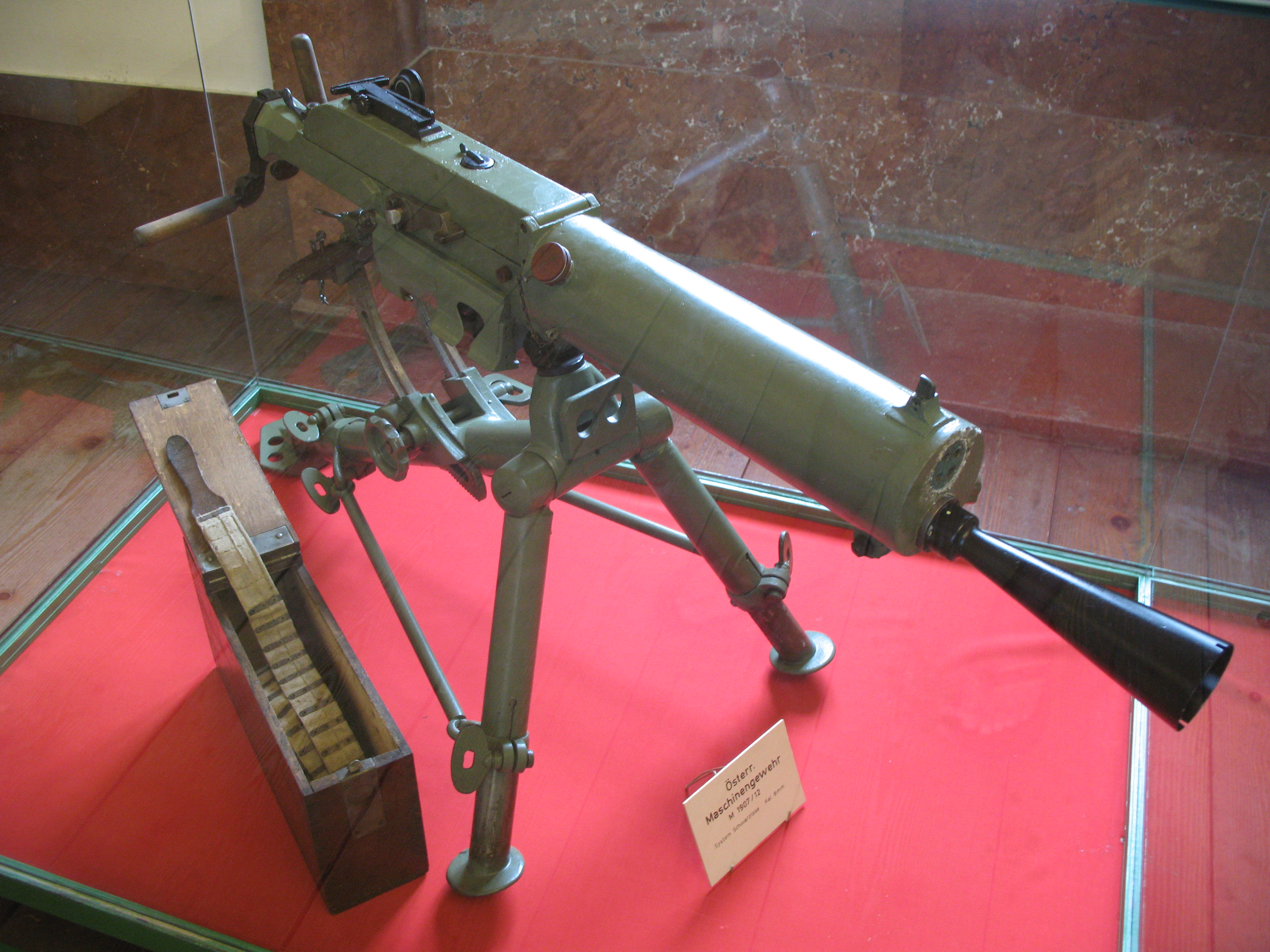
Schwarzlose MG M.07/12

After their defeat at Königgrätz in 1866, Emperor Franz Joseph I and his army commanders were keen to learn lessons from the defeat, both in terms of armament, equipment and uniform, as well as army organization and military application. Very quickly, breech-loading guns were introduced, something that had hitherto been long-delayed, the use of which by the Prussians was seen as crucial to their success. Thus, the earlier Lorenz muzzle-loading system was converted to breech-loaders based on a proposal by Vienna master gunsmith, Karl Wänzel. The infantry small arms, Extra-Korps weapons and Jägerstutzen converted in this manner to single-shot breech-loaders were standardized under the designation "Model 1854/67" or "Model 1862/67" and distributed to the respective branches of service. However, the Wänzel system was not intended to be anything more than a temporary stopgap. Subsequently, the tabernacle lock, developed by Joseph Werndl, provided an entirely new solution in the shape of a fundamentally groundbreaking breechblock system. This rotary block with loading groove for breech loading rifles subsequently made the Austrian Arms Factory (Österreichische Waffenfabriksgesellschaft) in Steyr into the biggest arms producer in Europe in its day. These small arms, standardized on the Werndl system, were introduced with the designations M1867, M1873, M1867/77 and M1873/77 and formed the standard weapon of the Imperial and Royal infantry and cavalry. for more than twenty years.

The next big leap in the development of the small arm was the transition from the single-shot breechloader to the repeater. The system developed by Ferdinand Mannlicher had a straight-pull bolt action and magazine of 5 cartridges in the centre of the stock. This weapon system, first standardized in the k.u.k. Army in 1886, was, at that time, one of the most advanced weapons in the world and, in its improved version, the M1895 was the standard rifle of Austro-Hungarian soldiers to the end of the First World War. Three million of these rifles were produced in Austria by Steyr Mannlicher and also in Hungary.

In addition to firearms, a number of edged weapons were standardized in the period from 1861 to the end of the Habsburg monarchy. These were the M1861, M1869 and M1904 cavalry officer's and trooper's sabres; the M1877 light cavalry sabre; the M1862 infantry officer's and soldier's sabre and the sabre for officers and men of the Imperial Landwehr Mountain Troops, this sabre also being used between the world wars by the Vienna Police. Furthermore, a standard M1853 engineers' sabre was produced which, with its wide, heavy blade functioned more as a cutting tool than a weapon. All of these edged weapons are displayed in the Museum of Military History, Vienna.

The development of handguns went through two different stages. In 1870, the revolver was introduced in 1870, in place of the previous single-shot, muzzle-loading pistol. These were the two high caliber guns developed by Leopold Gasser: the 11mm M1870 Army revolver and, four years later, the improved model M1870/74. In addition, there was also the 9mm infantry officer revolver, the Gasser-Kopratschek M1872, and the 8mm Rast & Gasser M1898. Subsequently, the multi-shot repeater pistol was introduced, namely the 9mm Roth–Steyr M1907 and Steyr M1912. Both guns have a rigidly locked recoil for chargers with a magazine for 10 and 8 rounds, respectively, in the grip.

From the end of the 19th century, several countries worked on the development of the machine gun. In Austria-Hungary in 1890 Archduke Karl Salvator and Major Georg Ritter von Dormus developed the so-called mitrailleuse. These early models are displayed in the Museum of Military History in Vienna. However, these technically highly ambitious developments proved to be unsuitable for use in the field, so eventually the Schwarzlose machine gun, developed by Andreas Schwarzlose, was introduced in 1907 as the Model M1907 and M1907/12. Both the repeating pistols described above, as well as the Schwarzlose machine gun, were used by the Austrian Army until 1938 after the k.u.k. Army was disbanded in 1918.

== Regimental colours ==
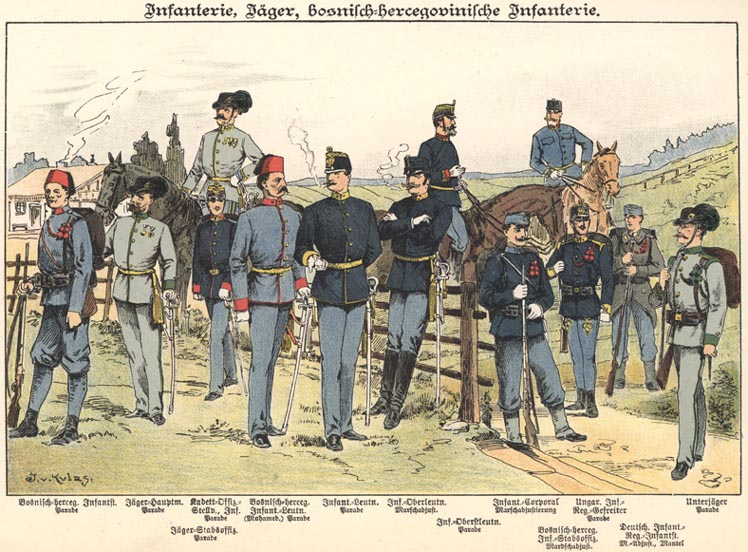
k.u.k. infantry around 1900

There were only two types of regimental colour in the Austro-Hungarian land forces of the Common Army.

- Regiments and battalions carried a white, rectangular standard on the obverse of which was the Imperial Eagle with the coat of arms of all kingdoms and lands in the Empire. On the reverse was a portrait of the Immaculate Mother of God within a corona and with twelve golden stars around her head.
- Infantry regiments (2nd, 4th, 39th, 41st and 57th) carried a rectangular imperial yellow standard with the imperial coat of arms both on the obverse and reverse sides.

Both types of standard were bordered on three sides by a yellow, black, red and white toothed pattern. The standards were made of silk and measured 132 × 176 cm.

They were assembled from two pieces, i.e. the reverse of the yellow standard was not a mirror image of the obverse side.

Standard of the Common Army in white (obverse)

Standard of the Common Army in white (reverse)

Standard of the Common Army in yellow (both sides identical)

== Conscription ==
From 1866 there was general conscription. It was defined from 1868 by agreed, identical laws in both the Austrian and Hungarian halves of the Empire. They covered service in the army, the navy, the Landwehr and the Landsturm.

The length of service in the standing armies was 12 years:

3 years in the line (active duty)
7 years in the reserve
2 years in the non-active part of the Landwehr

One-year voluntary service was permitted both in the army (or the navy) as well as the Landwehr. The one-year volunteers received no wages and equipment (including a horse if needed) had to be procured. Compulsory service began at age 21. All persons aged 19 to 42 were liable for Landsturm service, unless they belonged to the army, the Landwehr and the replacement reserve.

== Peacetime order of battle in July 1914 ==
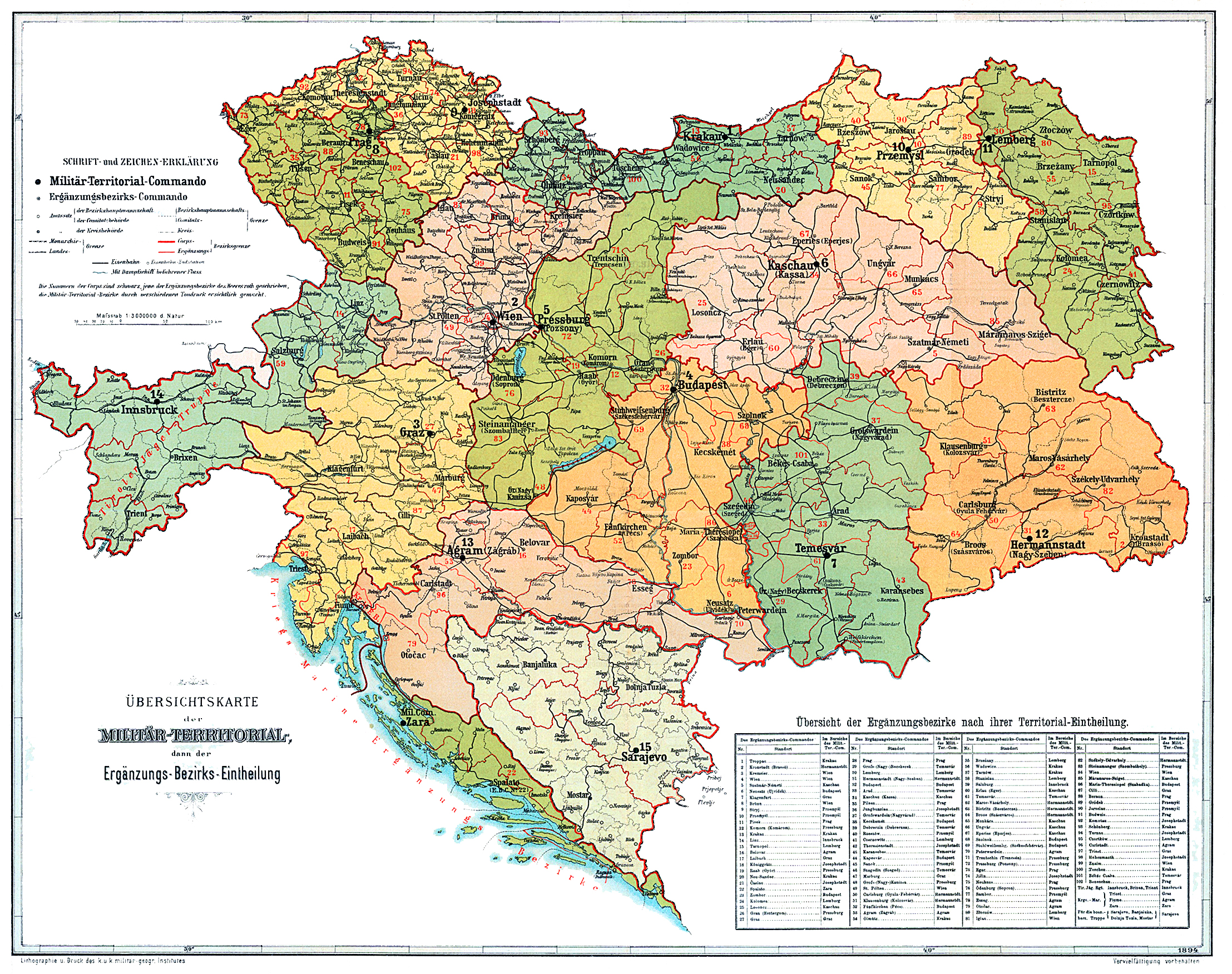
Corps areas in the Austro-Hungarian Army

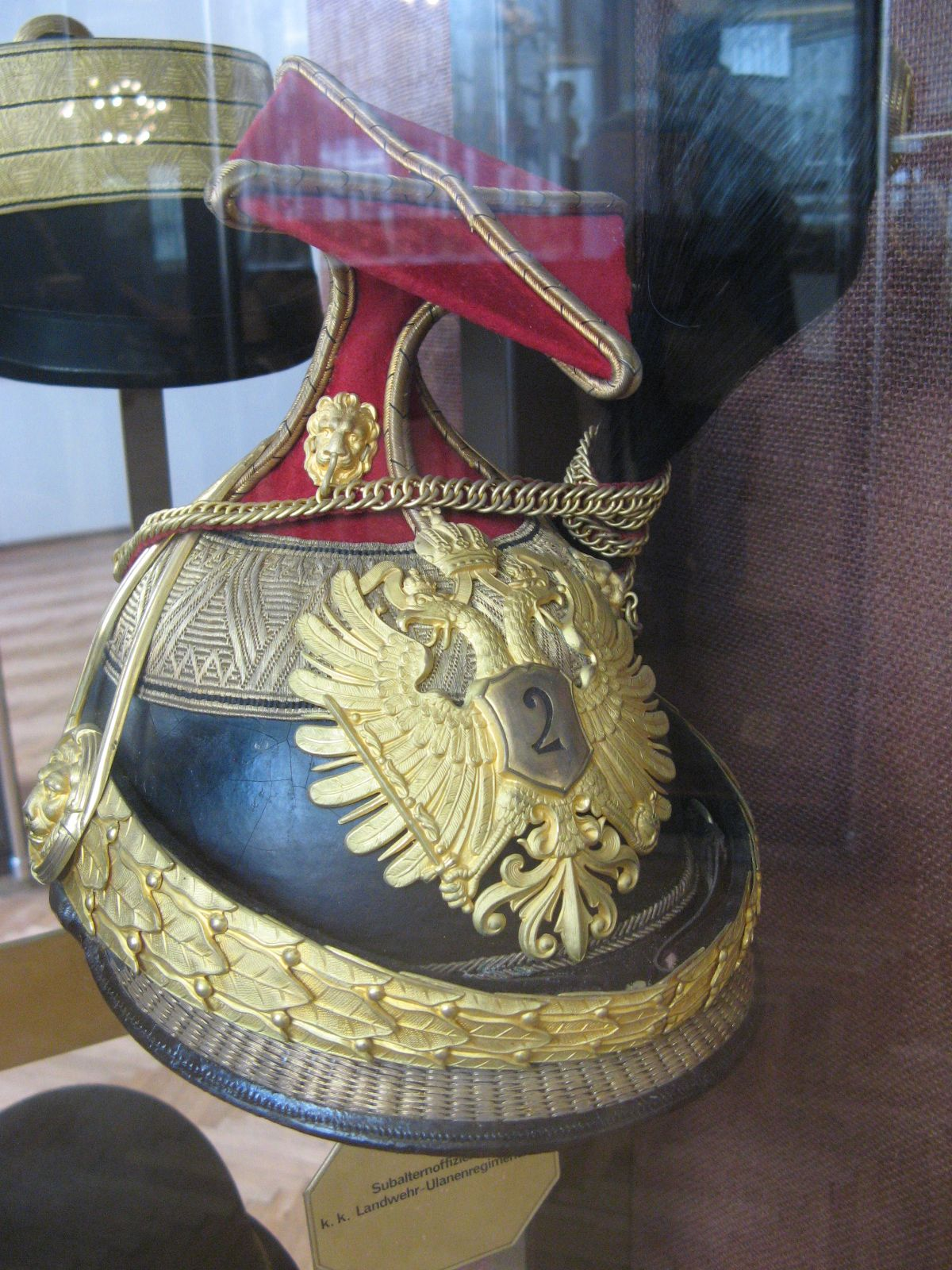
Officer's czapka (cap), 2nd Landwehr Lancers

In July 1914, the Common Army's order of battle was as follows:

- 16 corps
- 49 infantry divisions - 76 infantry brigades - 14 mountain brigades
- 8 cavalry divisions - 16 cavalry brigades

Infantry:

- 102 infantry regiments (each of four battalions)
- 4 Bosnian-Herzegovinian (Bosnisch-Hercegowinische) infantry regiments (each of four battalions)
- 4 Imperial Tyrolian rifle regiments (Tiroler Kaiserjäger) (each of four battalions)
- 32 rifle battalions (Feldjäger) - 1 Bosnian-Herzegovinian rifle battalion (Bosnisch-Hercegowinisches Feldjäger Bataillon)

Cavalry:

- 15 regiments of dragoons (Dragoner)
- 16 regiments of hussars (Husaren)
- 11 regiments of lancers (Ulanen)

The only difference between heavy (uhlan) and light (dragoon, hussar) cavalry was in the uniforms and unit titles; which were chosen for genuine historic reasons.

Artillery:

- 42 field artillery regiments (Feldkanonen-Regimenter)
- 14 field howitzer regiments (Feldhaubitz-Regimenter)
- 11 horse artillery battalions (Reitende Artillerie- Divisionen)
- 14 heavy howitzer battalions (Schwere Haubitz-Divisionen)
- 11 mountain artillery regiments (Gebirgsartillerie Regimenter)
- 6 fortress artillery regiments (Festungsartillerie Regimenter)
- 8 (later 10) independent fortress artillery battalions (selbst. Festungsartillerie Bataillone)

Logistic troops:

- 16 logistic "divisions"

Technical troops:

- 14 sapper battalions (Sappeur-Bataillone)
- 9 engineer battalions (Pionier-Bataillone)
- 1 bridge battalion (Brücken-Bataillon)
- 1 railway regiment (Eisenbahn-Regiment)
- 1 telegraph regiment (Telegraphen-Regiment)

So-called march battalions (Marschbataillone) were used to raise personnel strength for mobilization as well in the replacement of battle casualties. There was no system of reserve regiments as in the German Army.

=== Languages ===
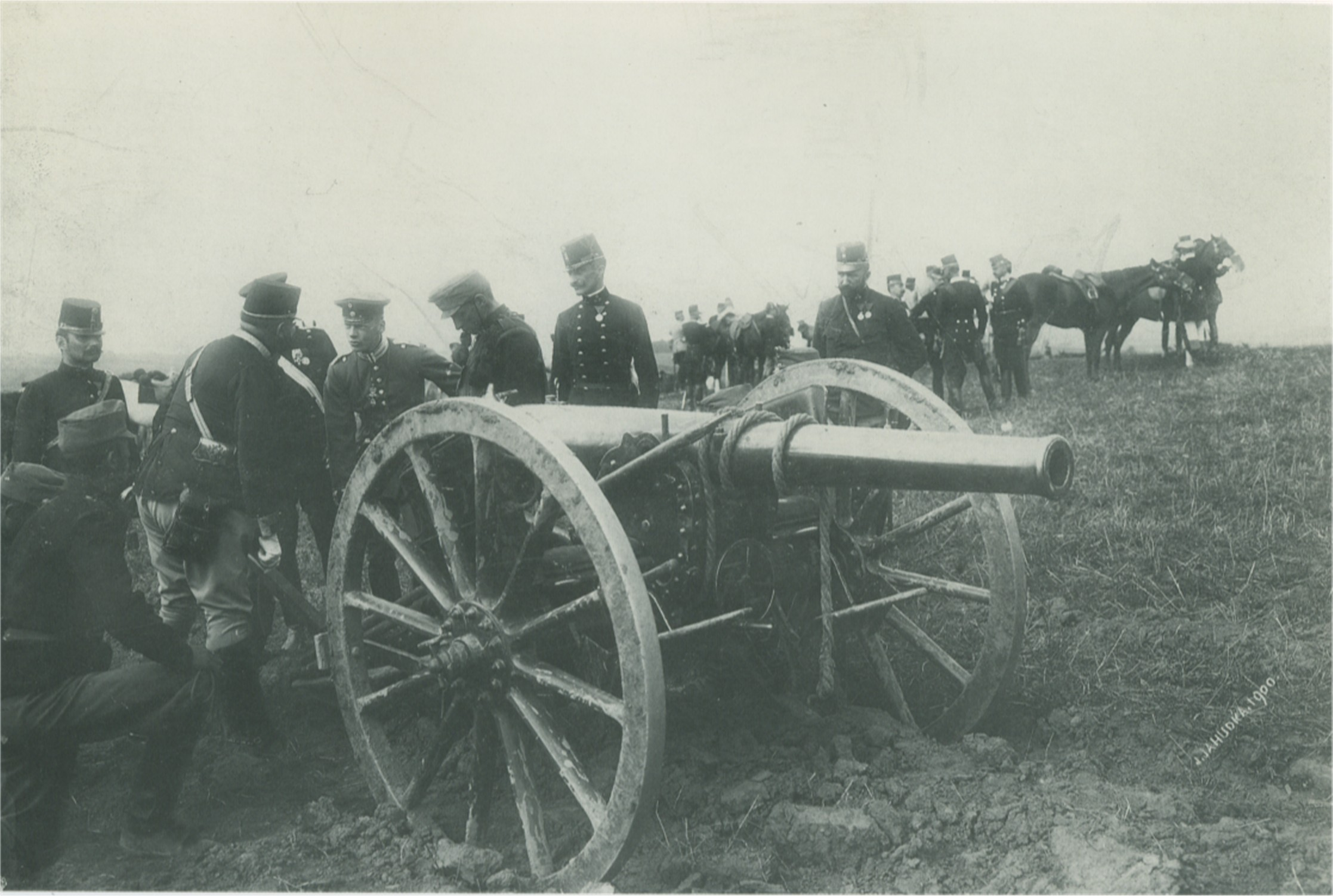
K.u.k. field artillery around 1900

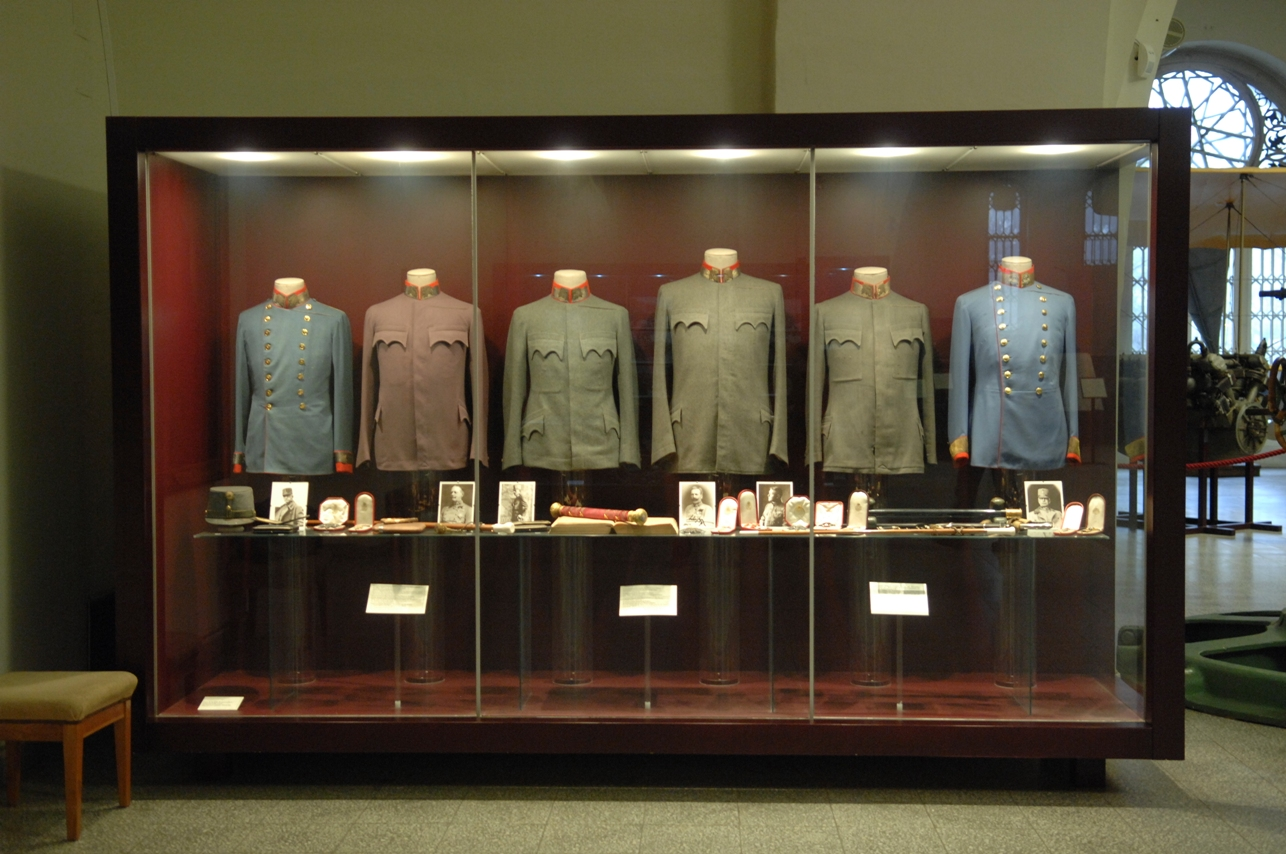
Adjustations of the k.u.k. Army in the Museum of Military History, Vienna

In the multinational state of the Imperial and Royal monarchy, German was the official, common, language of command and control. The roughly 100 relevant commands in German that were necessary for the effective discharge of their duties had to be learnt by every soldier. Only a small proportion of army units spoke German exclusively; and in the navy, Italian was spoken by the majority of sailors.

A "service language" was used for communications between military units. This was German in the Common Army and k.k. Landwehr, and Hungarian in the Honvéd.

The "regimental language" was used for communication with a regiment. It was the language that the majority of the men spoke. If, as in the case of the 100th Infantry in Krakau, the unit was made up of 27% Germans, 33% Czechs and 37% Poles, there were three regimental languages. Every officer had to learn the regimental language within three years. In all, there were 11 officially recognized languages in the k.u.k. monarchy.

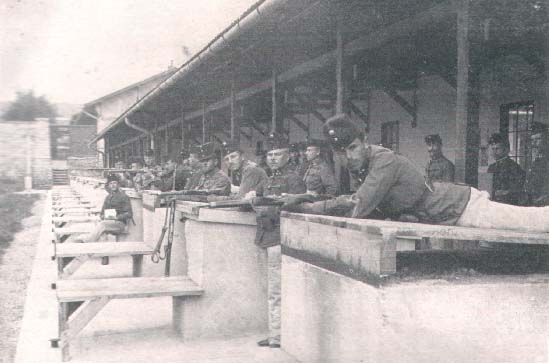
Shooting range

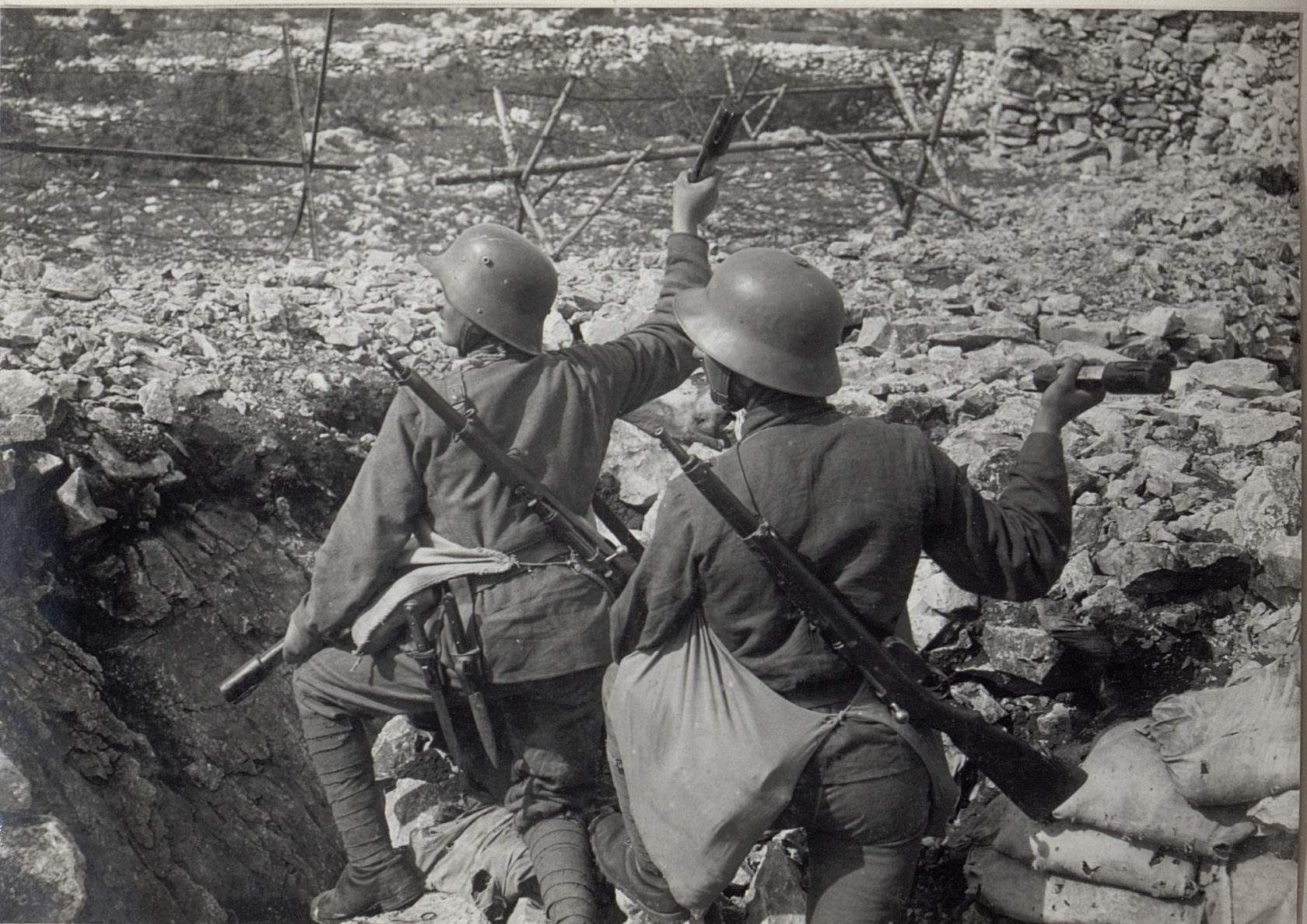
Austro-Hungarian infantry

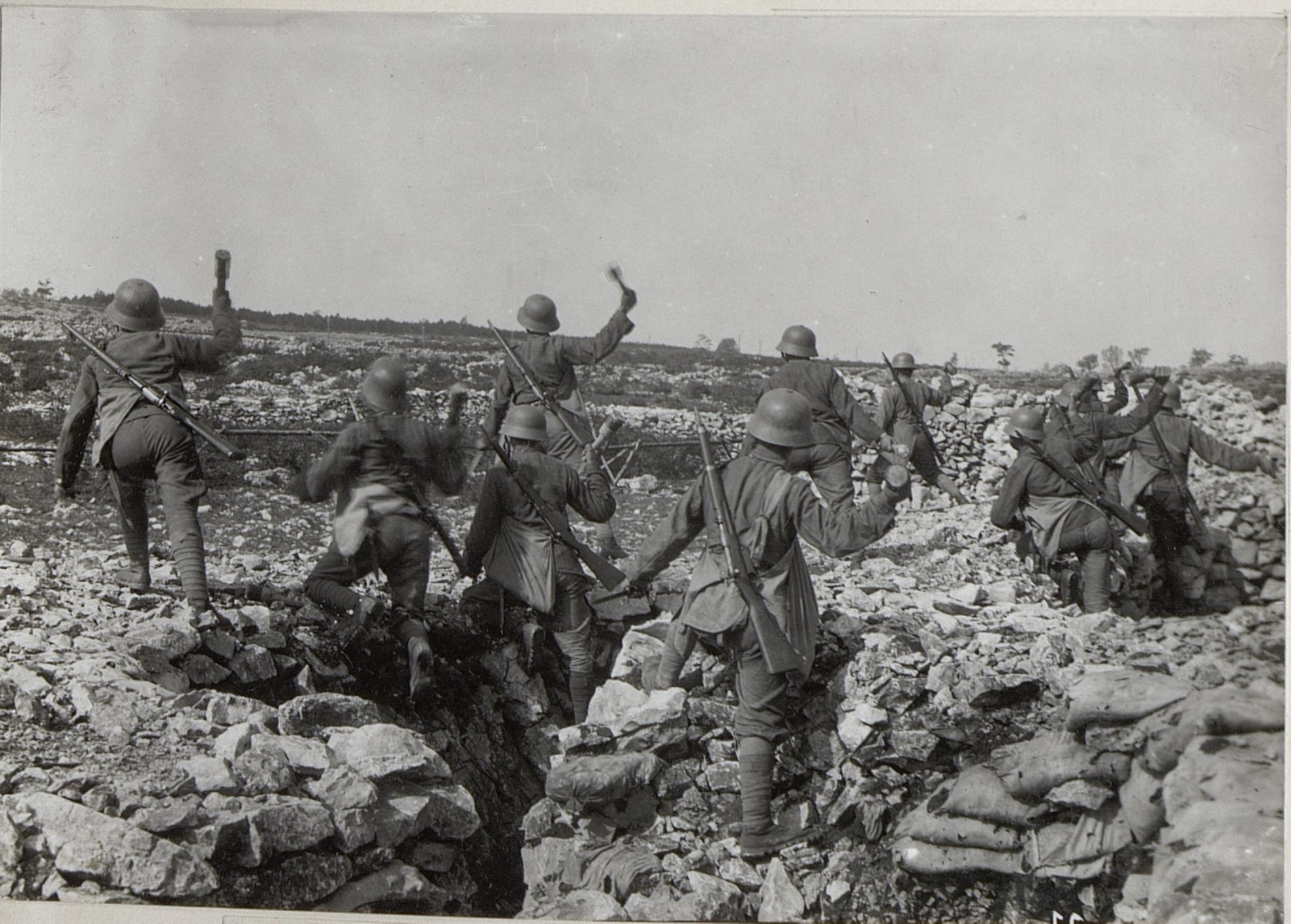
Austro-Hungarian assault troops (Italian front, September 1917)

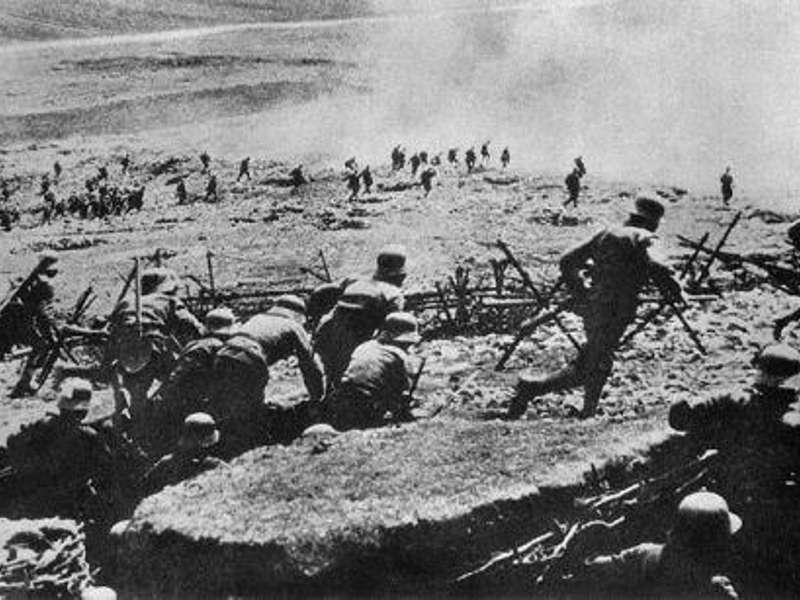
Attack at the Isonzo front

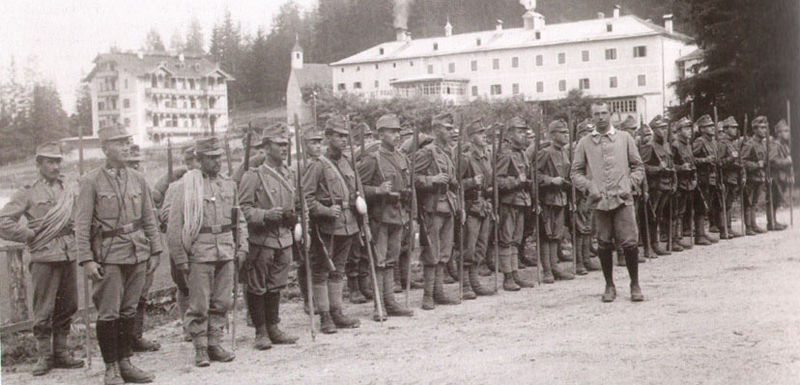
Austrian-Hungarian Gebirgsjäger in 1917

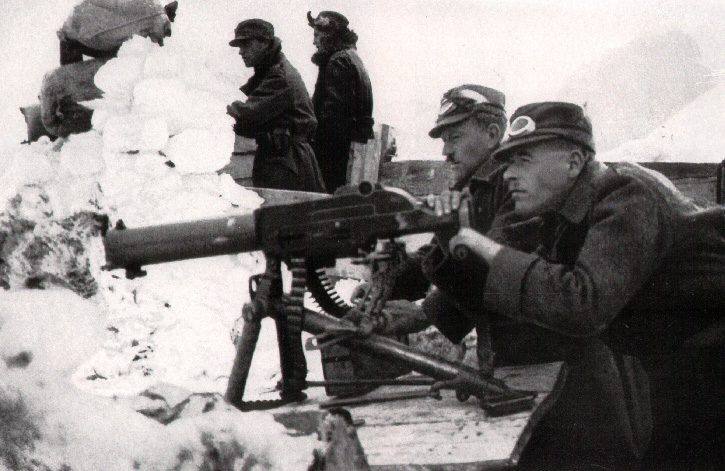
Austro-Hungarian machine-gun somewhere in the Tyrolean high mountains area

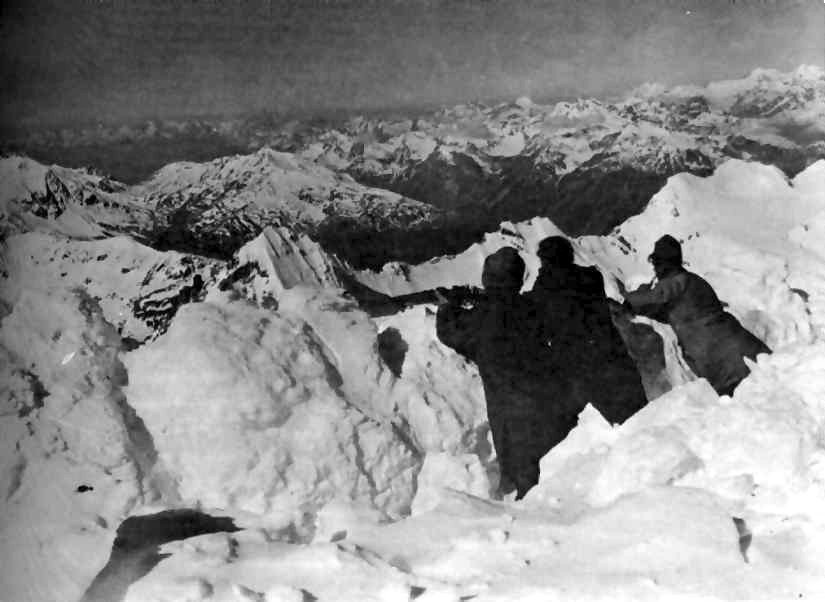
Highest trench in history of first world war (3850m) at the peak of Ortler

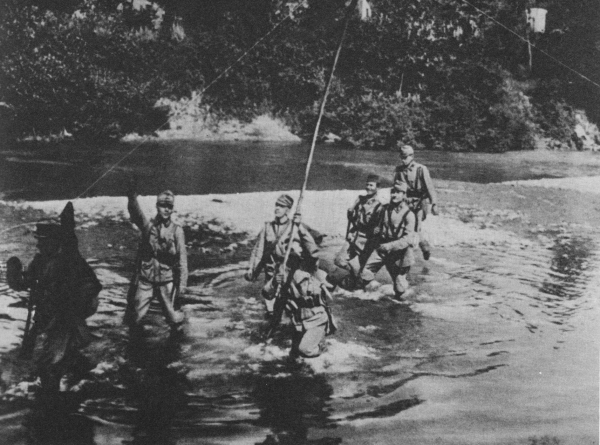
Field telegraph section Austria-Hungarian army in the construction of wire connections

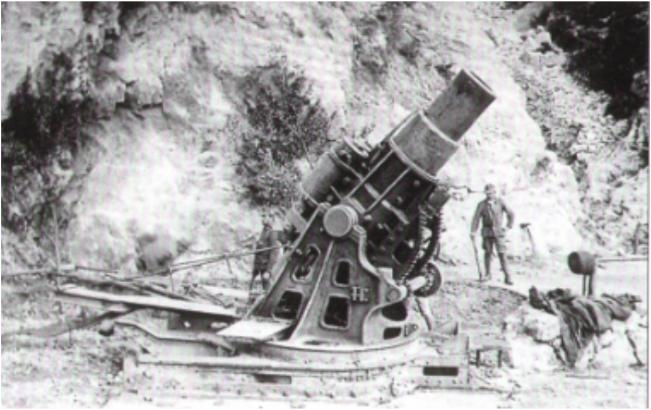
305 mm Howitzer

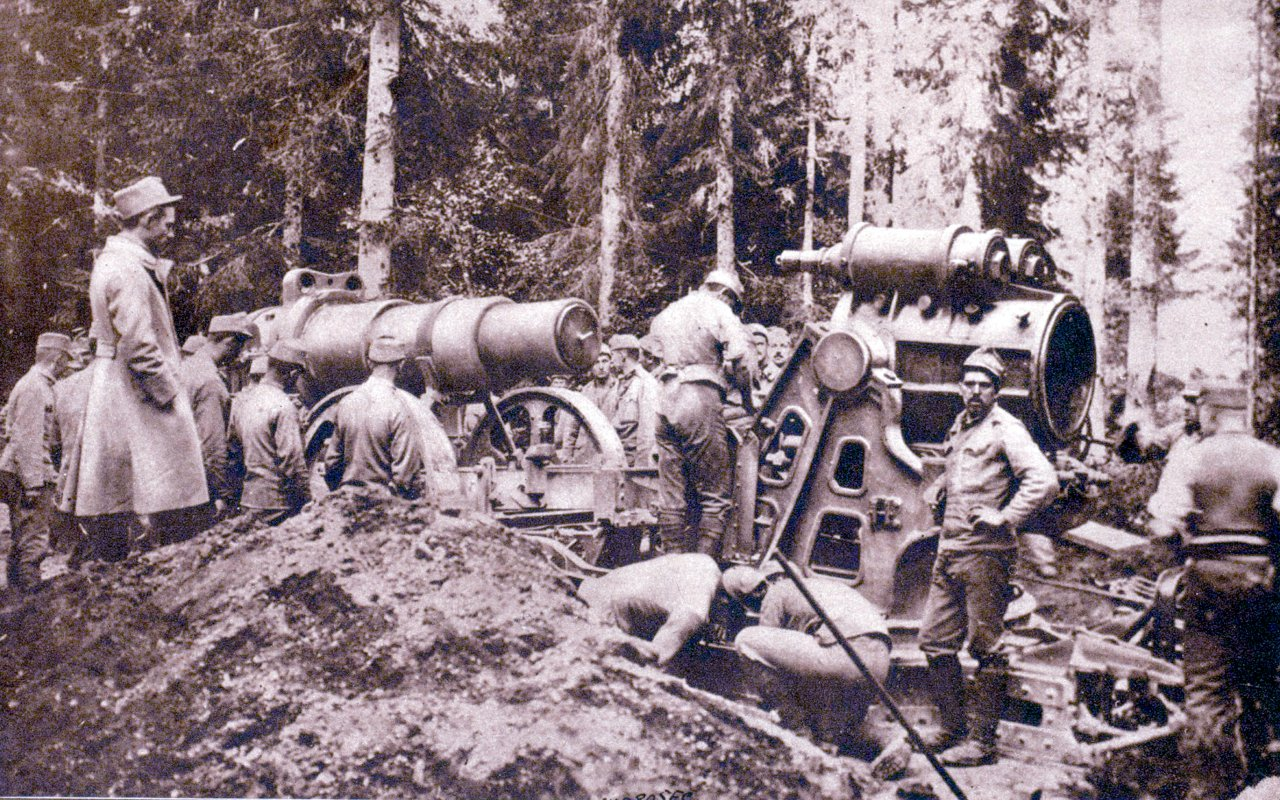
Škoda 305 mm Model 1911 of the Austro-Hungarian army being positioned in the Carpathians during the fighting of 1914/1915

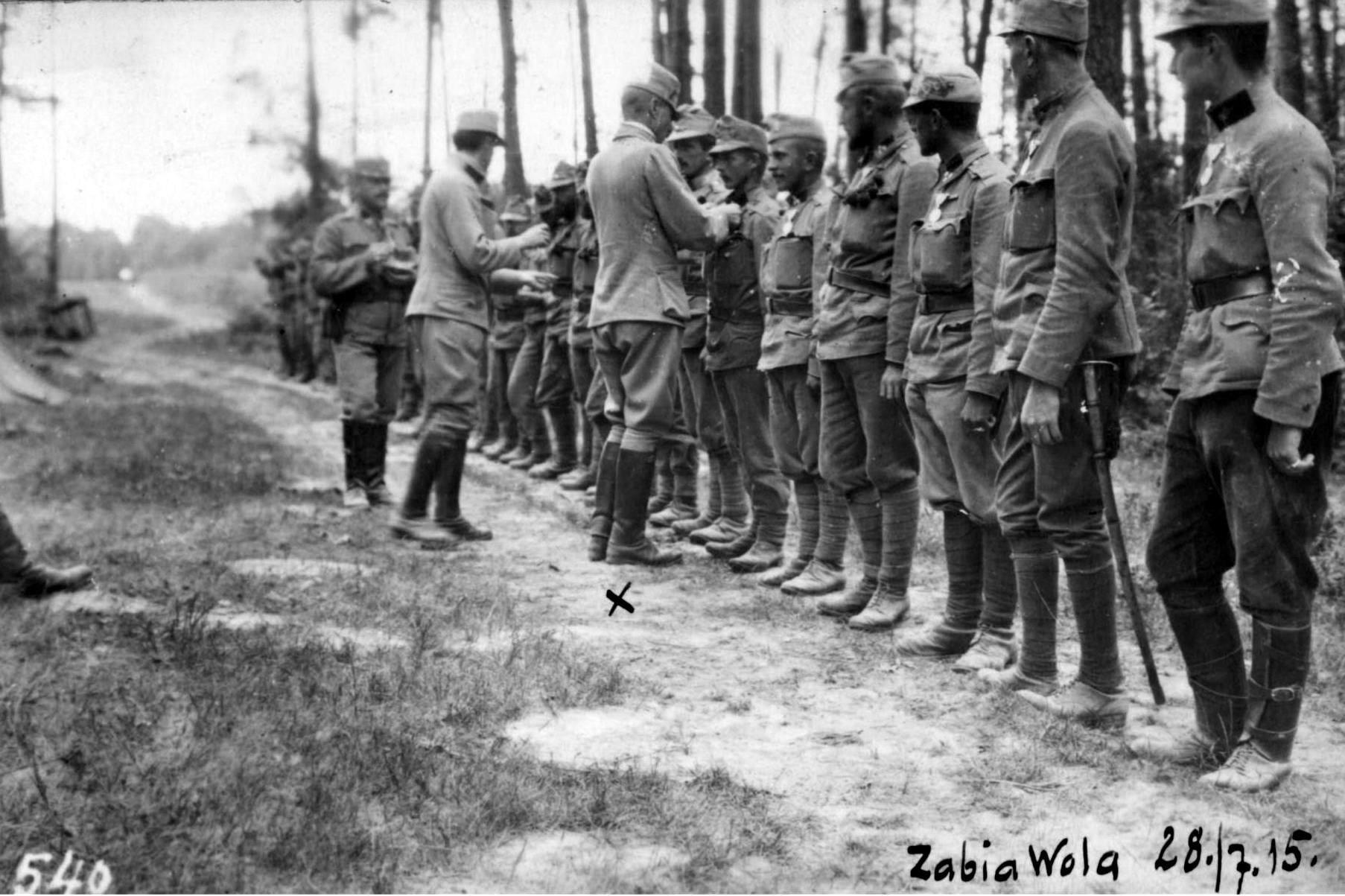
Soldiers getting decorated at the Eastern front

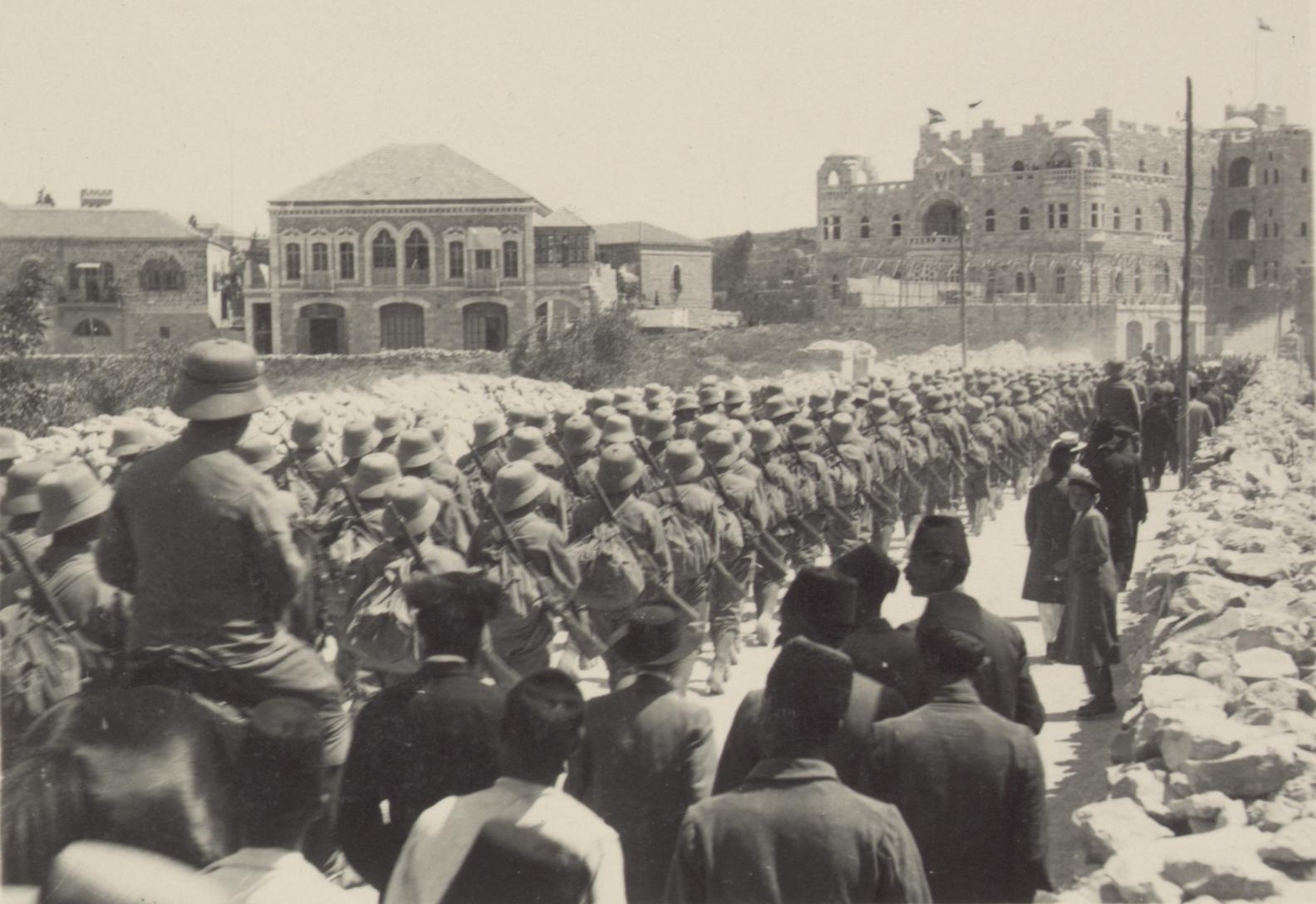
Austrian troops marching to their quarters at St. Paulus, Jerusalem

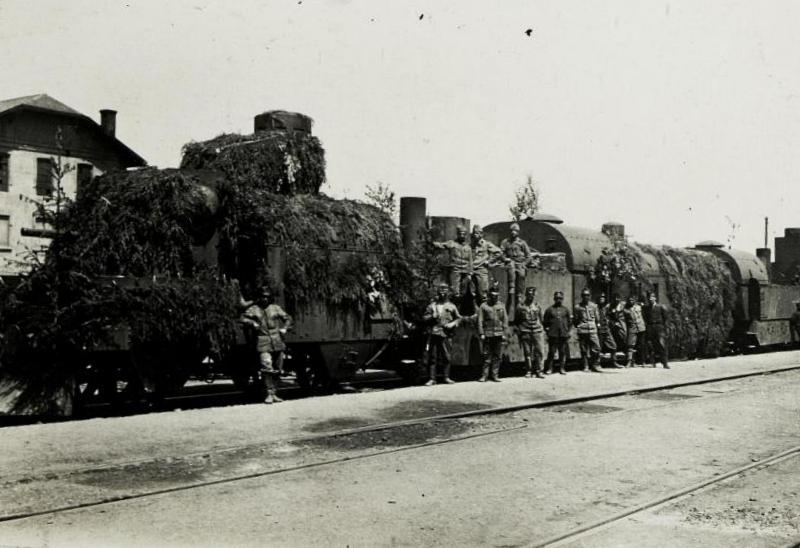
Austro-Hungarian armored train Nr. 8

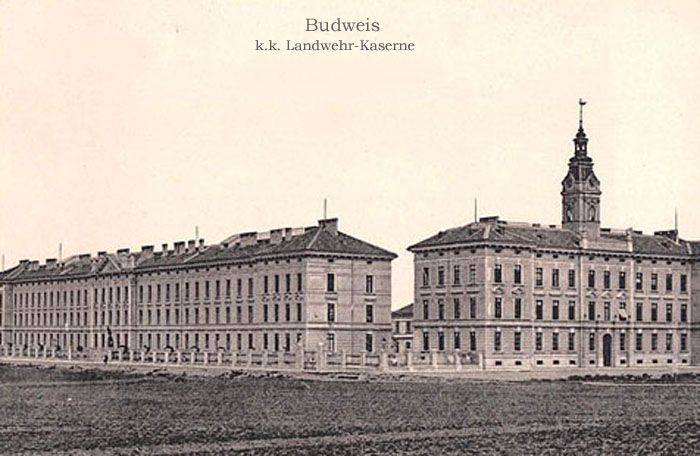
Barracks in Budweis

== General and cited references ==
- Johann Christoph Allmayer-Beck, Erich Lessing: Die K.u.k. Armee. 1848–1918. Verlag Bertelsmann, Munich, 1974, ISBN 3-570-07287-8
- Johann Christoph Allmayer-Beck: "Die bewaffnete Macht in Staat und Gesellschaft". In: Adam Wandruszka, Peter Urbanitsch (ed.), Die bewaffnete Macht (Die Habsburgermonarchie (1848–1918) 5, Vienna, 1987) 1–141
- Oskar Brüch], Günter Dirrheimer: Schriften des Heeresgeschichtlichen Museums in Wien, Vol. 10: Das k.u.k. Heer 1895, Militärwissenschaftliches Institut, Stocker Verlag, Graz, 1997, ISBN 3-7020-0783-0
- Laurence Cole, Christa Hämmerle, Martin Scheutz (ed.), Glanz - Gewalt - Gehorsam. Militär und Gesellschaft in der Habsburgermonarchie (1800 bis 1918), Essen, 2011.
- Graf Bossi Fedregotti: Kaiserjäger, Stocker Verlag, Graz, 1977
- Hubert Frankhauser, Wilfried Gallin: Unbesiegt und doch geschlagen, Verlagsbuchhandlung Stöhr, Vienna, 2005
- Christa Hämmerle, Die k. (u.) k. Armee als 'Schule des Volkes'? Zur Geschichte der Allgemeinen Wehrpflicht in der multinationalen Habsburgermonarchie (1866-1914/18), in: Christian Jansen (ed.), Der Bürger als Soldat. Die Militarisierung europäischer Gesellschaften im langen 19. Jahrhundert: ein internationaler Vergleich, Essen, 2004, 175-213.
- Glenn Jewison, Jörg C. Steiner: The Austro-Hungarian Land Forces 1848–1918
- k.u.k. Kriegsministerium "Adjustierungsvorschrift für das k.u.k. Heer, die k.k. Landwehr, die k.u. Landwehr, die verbundenen Einrichtungen und das Korps der Militärbeamten", Vienna, 1911/1912
- k.u.k. Kriegsministerium "Dislokation und Einteilung des k.u.k Heeres, der k.u.k. Kriegsmarine, der k.k. Landwehr und der k.u. Landwehr" in: Seidel's kleines Armeeschema - published by Seidel& Sohn, Vienna, 1914
- Julius Lohmeyer: Das Militär Bilderbuch – Die Armeen Europas, Carl Flemming Verlag, Glogau o.J.
- Peter Melichar, Alexander Mejstrik: Die bewaffnete Macht. In: Helmut Rumpler, Peter Urbanitsch (ed.): Die Habsburgermonarchie 1948-1918. Vol. IX: Soziale Strukturen, Part 1, Section 2, Verlag der Österreichischen Akademie der Wissenschaften, Vienna, 2010, 1263-1326
- Manfried Rauchensteiner: Österreich-Ungarn und der Erste Weltkrieg: Bildband, Steirische Verlagsgesellschaft, Graz, 1998
- Manfried Rauchensteiner: Der Tod des Doppeladlers: Österreich-Ungarn und der Erste Weltkrieg, 2nd ed., Verlag Styria, Graz, 1994
- Stefan Rest, M. Christian Ortner, Thomas Ilming: Des Kaisers Rock im Ersten Weltkrieg – Uniformierung und Ausrüstung der österreichisch-ungarischen Armee von 1914 bis 1918, Verlag Militaria, Vienna, 2002, ISBN 3-9501642-0-0
- Tamara Scheer, Language Diversity in the Habsburg Army, 1868-1918, unpublished Habilitation Thesis, University of Vienna, Vienna 2020. http://othes.univie.ac.at/65387/
- Peter Urbanitsch and Helmut Rumpler (ed.): Die Habsburgermonarchie 1848–1918 / Verfassung und Parlamentarismus: Verfassungsrecht, Verfassungswirklichkeit, zentrale Repräsentativkörperschaften. Vol. VII, Vienna, Verlag der Österreichischen Akademie der Wissenschaften, 2000, ISBN 3-7001-2869-X.
- Heinz von Lichem: Der Tiroler Hochgebirgskrieg 1915–1918. Steiger Verlag, Berwang (Tyrol), 1985, ISBN 3-85423-052-4
- Heinz von Lichem: Spielhahnstoß und Edelweiß – die Friedens- und Kriegsgeschichte der Tiroler Hochgebirgstruppe „Die Kaiserschützen“ von ihren Anfängen bis 1918, Stocker Verlag, Graz, 1977, ISBN 3-7020-0260-X
- Obstlt. Alphons Frhr. von Wrede, "Geschichte der K.u.K. Wehrmacht von 1618 bis Ende des XIX Jh.", Vienna, 1898-1905.
- Adam Wandruszka (ed.): Die Habsburgermonarchie 1848–1918 / Die bewaffnete Macht. Band V, Vienna, Verlag der Österreichischen Akademie der Wissenschaften, 1987, ISBN 3-7001-1122-3.
