= Werndl–Holub rifle =

M1867 Werndl–Holub
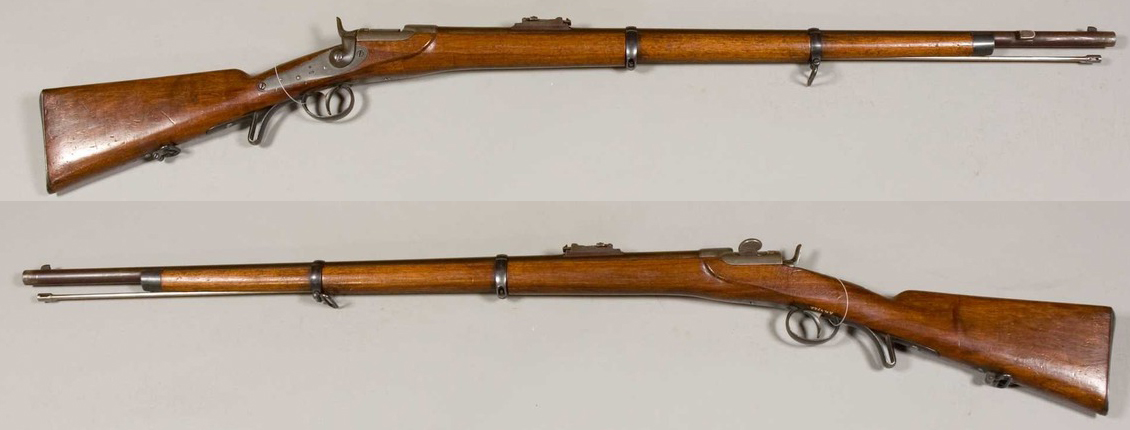
- Type: Service rifle
- Place of origin: Austria-Hungary

Service history
- In service: 1867–1886 (primary Austro-Hungarian service rifle); 1886–1921 (limited use)
- Used by: Austria-Hungary; See users
- Wars: See conflicts

Production history
- Designer: Josef Werndl and Karel Holub
- Designed: 1860s
- Manufacturer: Josef und Franz Werndl & Comp. (ÖWG after 1869); F. Fruwirth a Bentz (up to 1873)
- Unit cost: 50 florins (1867)
- Produced: 1867–1888
- No. built: 686,000 (by 1874)
- Variants: See § Variants

Specifications
- Mass: 9.65 lb (4.4 kg)
- Length: 50.4 in (128.0 cm)
- Barrel length: 33.3 in (84.6 cm)
- Cartridge: 11.15×42mmR (M1867); 11.15×58mmR (1877 Upgrade); 11.15x36mmR (Carbine)
- Caliber: 11.15 mm
- Action: Rotating drum bolt
- Rate of fire: 12–14 aimed shots per minute 24 unaimed shots per minute
- Muzzle velocity: 439 m/s (1,440.3 ft/s)
- Effective firing range: 300 m (328.1 yd) (point target)
- Maximum firing range: 1,070 m (1,170.2 yd) (maximum setting on sights)
- Feed system: Single-shot breech-loading
- Sights: Iron sights graduated from 200 to 1,400 paces

The M1867 Werndl–Holub was a single-shot breechloading rifle adopted by the Austro-Hungarian army on 28 July 1867. It replaced the Wänzl breechloader conversion of the muzzle-loading Lorenz rifle. Josef Werndl (1831–1889) and Karel Holub (1830–1903) designed and patented their rifle; Werndl later bought out all the rights, but was involved in name only.

== Production ==
In 1867, the army ordered 611,000 of the new rifles. The first batch of 100,000 rifles cost 5 million florins, or 50 florins per rifle. The army received 14 million florins in funding to acquire Werndl rifles and ammunition in 1868. The budget was then cut to just 1 million in 1869. As a result, by November 1870, only 316,650 Werndl breechloaders had been produced and the army still needed an additional 302,810 rifles to fulfill the needs of the regular troops, without taking into account the demands of the Imperial-Royal Landwehr and the Royal Hungarian Honvéd. In February 1873, the war minister Franz Kuhn von Kuhnenfeld stated a need for 370,000 more Werndl rifles for the army.

ÖWG (Österreichische Waffenfabriksgesellschaft) produced the Werndl and chambered it for the 11mm scharfe Patrone M.67 (11.15×42mmR) cartridge. Rifles produced before the reorganization and name change (from Josef und Franz Werndl & Comp. Waffenfabrik und Sägemühle to ÖWG) were marked Werndl, while later rifles were marked OEWG. In 1877, the military rechambered many Werndl rifles for the bottleneck 11mm scharfe Patrone M.77 (11.15×58mmR) cartridge. Some of the ones held back from conversion (due to large quantities of 11.15x42R ammunition) were marked O.P. to differentiate them from upgraded rifles.

== Use ==
In spite of the Werndl being long obsolete by World War I, the Austro-Hungarian forces issued Werndl rifles to rear-echelon units to free up more modern rifles for use by front-line troops.

== Variants ==
- M1867 rifle − Issued to infantry and Jägers
- M1867 carbine − Issued to cavalry units including Dragoons, Hussars, and Uhlans
- M1867 extra-corps carbine − A slightly modified cavalry carbine featuring a quadrangular bayonet; issued to engineers, pioneers, and the Austro-Hungarian Navy
- M1873 rifle − Infantry and Jäger rifle
- M1873 carbine − Cavalry carbine
- M1873 extra-corps carbine − Used by engineers, pioneers and the navy

== Comparison with contemporary rifles ==
Comparison of 1880s rifles
Calibre	System	Country	Velocity					Height of trajectory				Ammunition	
Calibre	System	Country	Muzzle	500 yd (460 m)	1,000 yd (910 m)	1,500 yd (1,400 m)	2,000 yd (1,800 m)	500 yd (460 m)	1,000 yd (910 m)	1,500 yd (1,400 m)	2,000 yd (1,800 m)	Propellant	Bullet
.433 in (11.0 mm)	Werndl–Holub rifle	Austria-Hungary	1,439 ft/s (439 m/s)	854 ft/s (260 m/s)	620 ft/s (190 m/s)	449 ft/s (137 m/s)	328 ft/s (100 m/s)	8.252 ft (2.515 m)	49.41 ft (15.06 m)	162.6 ft (49.6 m)	426.0 ft (129.8 m)	77 gr (5.0 g)	370 gr (24 g)
.45 in (11.43 mm)	Martini–Henry	United Kingdom	1,315 ft/s (401 m/s)	869 ft/s (265 m/s)	664 ft/s (202 m/s)	508 ft/s (155 m/s)	389 ft/s (119 m/s)	9.594 ft (2.924 m)	47.90 ft (14.60 m)	147.1 ft (44.8 m)	357.85 ft (109.07 m)	85 gr (5.5 g)	480 gr (31 g)
.433 in (11.0 mm)	Fusil Gras mle 1874	France	1,489 ft/s (454 m/s)	878 ft/s (268 m/s)	643 ft/s (196 m/s)	471 ft/s (144 m/s)	348 ft/s (106 m/s)	7.769 ft (2.368 m)	46.6 ft (14.2 m)	151.8 ft (46.3 m)	389.9 ft (118.8 m)	80 gr (5.2 g)	386 gr (25.0 g)
.433 in (11.0 mm)	Mauser Model 1871	Germany	1,430 ft/s (440 m/s)	859 ft/s (262 m/s)	629 ft/s (192 m/s)	459 ft/s (140 m/s)	388 ft/s (118 m/s)	8.249 ft (2.514 m)	48.68 ft (14.84 m)	159.2 ft (48.5 m)	411.1 ft (125.3 m)	75 gr (4.9 g)	380 gr (25 g)
.408 in (10.4 mm)	M1870 Italian Vetterli	Italy	1,430 ft/s (440 m/s)	835 ft/s (255 m/s)	595 ft/s (181 m/s)	422 ft/s (129 m/s)	304 ft/s (93 m/s)	8.527 ft (2.599 m)	52.17 ft (15.90 m)	176.3 ft (53.7 m)	469.9 ft (143.2 m)	62 gr (4.0 g)	310 gr (20 g)
.397 in (10.08 mm)	Jarmann M1884	Norway and Sweden	1,536 ft/s (468 m/s)	908 ft/s (277 m/s)	675 ft/s (206 m/s)	504 ft/s (154 m/s)	377 ft/s (115 m/s)	7.235 ft (2.205 m)	42.97 ft (13.10 m)	137.6 ft (41.9 m)	348.5 ft (106.2 m)	77 gr (5.0 g)	337 gr (21.8 g)
.42 in (10.67 mm)	Berdan rifle	Russia	1,444 ft/s (440 m/s)	873 ft/s (266 m/s)	645 ft/s (197 m/s)	476 ft/s (145 m/s)	353 ft/s (108 m/s)	7.995 ft (2.437 m)	47.01 ft (14.33 m)	151.7 ft (46.2 m)	388.7 ft (118.5 m)	77 gr (5.0 g)	370 gr (24 g)
.45 in (11.43 mm)	Springfield model 1884	United States	1,301 ft/s (397 m/s)	875 ft/s (267 m/s)	676 ft/s (206 m/s)	523 ft/s (159 m/s)	404 ft/s (123 m/s)	8.574 ft (2.613 m)	46.88 ft (14.29 m)	142.3 ft (43.4 m)	343.0 ft (104.5 m)	70 gr (4.5 g)	500 gr (32 g)
.40 in (10.16 mm)	Enfield-Martini	United Kingdom	1,570 ft/s (480 m/s)	947 ft/s (289 m/s)	719 ft/s (219 m/s)	553 ft/s (169 m/s)	424 ft/s (129 m/s)	6.704 ft (2.043 m)	39.00 ft (11.89 m)	122.0 ft (37.2 m)	298.47 ft (90.97 m)	85 gr (5.5 g)	384 gr (24.9 g)

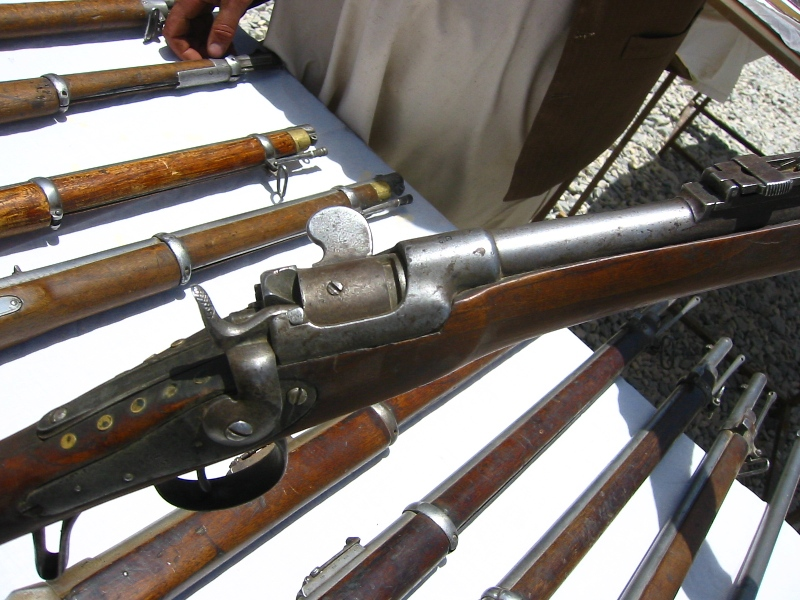
The unique breechloading system of the Werndl

== Users ==
- Afghanistan: Imported in the late 19th century, local copies were also made.
- Principality of Albania
- Austria-Hungary
- Argentina: Small amounts of Werndl rifles were bought in 1869, a few were used by the artillery of Buenos Aires during the 1880 revolution.
- Czechoslovakia
- Kingdom of Dahomey
- Ethiopian Empire
- Luxembourg
- Principality of Montenegro: 20,000 in use with the army by 1895.
- Qajar Iran: 26,000 ordered after 1878. Main rifle in the Persian army after further orders.
- Polish Legions in World War I
- Poland
- Ukrainian Sich Riflemen
- Kingdom of Yugoslavia

== Conflicts ==
- Paraguayan War (Limited)
- Krivošije uprising 1869
- Herzegovina uprising 1875–1877
- Montenegrin–Ottoman War 1876–78
- Austro-Hungarian campaign in Bosnia and Herzegovina in 1878
- Battles for Plav and Gusinje 1879-1880
- Revolution of 1880
- Kurdish uprising 1880-1881
- Herzegovina uprising 1882
- First Italo-Ethiopian War 1894-1896
- First Balkan War 1912-1913
- Second Balkan War 1913
- World War I (limited)
- Ukrainian War of Independence 1917-1921 (limited)
- Retaking of Czech Borderland 1918-1919 (limited)
- Austro-Slovene conflict in Carinthia 1918-1919 (limited)
- Revolutions and interventions in Hungary 1918-1920 (limited)
- Hungarian–Czechoslovak War 1918-1919 (limited)
- Polish–Ukrainian War 1918-1919 (limited)
- Silesian Uprisings 1919-1921
- Polish–Czechoslovak War 1919 (limited)
- Polish–Soviet War 1919-1921 (limited)

== See also ==
- Weaponry of the Austro-Hungarian Empire
- Mannlicher M1886 – the next Austro-Hungarian service rifle
