= Royal Hungarian Honvéd =

One of the four armed forces of the Austro-Hungarian Army

Obverse of the Royal Hungarian Honvéd's colours

Reverse of the Royal Hungarian Honvéd's colours

The Royal Hungarian Honvéd (Hungarian: Magyar Királyi Honvédség) or Royal Hungarian Landwehr (German: königlich ungarische Landwehr), commonly known as the Honvéd (lit. 'Defender of the Homeland'; collectively, the Honvédség), was one of the four armed forces (German: Bewaffnete Macht or Wehrmacht) of Austria-Hungary from 1867 to 1918, along with the Austrian Landwehr, the Common Army and the Imperial and Royal Navy. The term honvéd was used to refer to all members of the Hungarian land forces in 1848-49, but it was also used to refer to enlisted private soldiers without a rank.

== History ==
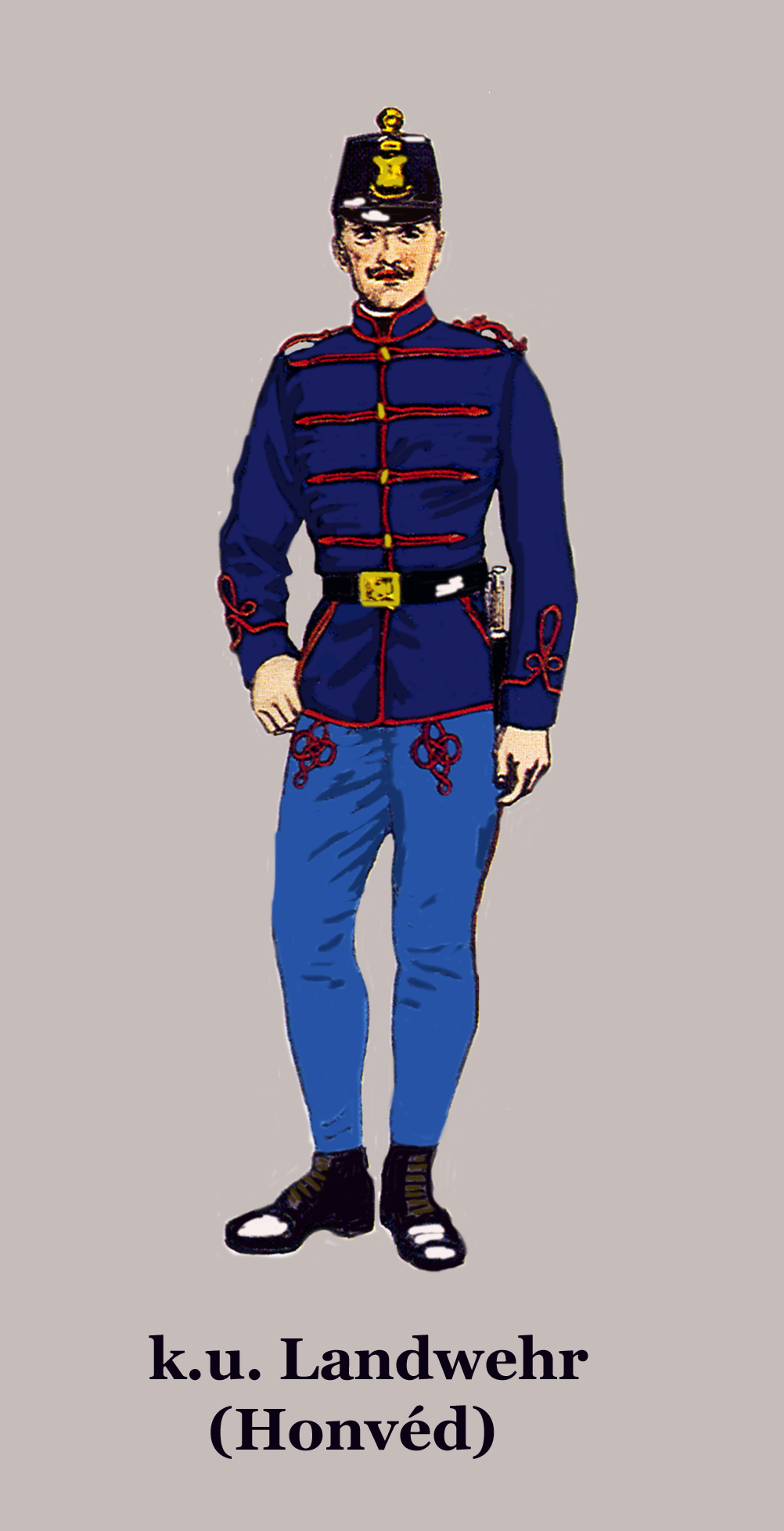
Soldier of the Royal Hungarian Honvéd in parade dress

The word honvéd in Hungarian (sometimes "honved" in English sources) means "defender of the homeland" and first appeared during the 1848 revolutions. At that time it was the name given to volunteers who were engaged for several weeks or a győzelemig (i.e. "until victory") and sent to fight the Serbs and Croats. Subsequently, the bulk of the fighting was against the Empire of Austria, whereupon a number of regular imperial regiments went over to the Hungarian side. Some volunteers were attached to these existing regiments and some joined new regular regiments. Consequently, the term honvéd was used to refer to all members of the Hungarian land forces in 1848-49. The Honvéd was finally defeated by Austria with Russian assistance.

Around 40% of the private soldiers in the Hungarian Revolutionary Volunteer Army consisted of ethnic minorities of the country. During the Hungarian revolution, around half of the officers and generals of the Hungarian Honvéd Army had foreign origin. There were at least as many ethnic Hungarian professional officers in the Imperial Habsburg army as in the Hungarian revolutionary Honvéd army.

Following the Austro-Hungarian Compromise of 1867, the Royal Hungarian Honvéd was restored for Hungary, and the Imperial-Royal Landwehr was created for Austria, but both states had to continue to finance the Austro-Hungarian Common Army, much larger than both. A common Austro-Hungarian War Ministry was formed immediately for the large Common Army, but it had no right to command directly the smaller Austrian Landwehr and the Hungarian Honvéd armies, which were respectively placed under the direct control of the separate Austrian and Hungarian Ministries of Defence. The Austrian and Hungarian Ministers of Defence were not placed under the command and jurisdiction of the Common War Ministry; they were subordinated only to their own prime ministers and the respective parliaments in Vienna and Budapest. The Hungarian Honvéd army could join the imperial army only with the explicit authorization of the Hungarian government.

The monarch became the supreme warlord, holding all authority over the structure, organization, and administration of the army. He appointed the senior officials, had the right to declare war, and was the commander-in-chief of the army.

On 21 May 1893 the Honvéd Memorial was unveiled in Budapest in commemoration of the deeds of the Hungarian national army during the Hungarian Revolution of 1848-49. From 1919 to 1945, Honvédség was also a name given to the Royal Hungarian Army.

== Structure ==
The Hungarian Landwehr consisted of territorial units from the Hungarian half (called Transleithania or the Lands of the Crown of Saint Stephen) of Austria-Hungary, the historical territory of the Kingdom of Hungary: These territories included what is present-day Hungary, Slovakia (so-called Upper Hungary) and parts of the present-day countries of Austria (Burgenland), Croatia, Romania (Banat, Crișana, Maramureș, Transylvania), Serbia (Banat, Vojvodina), Slovenia (Prekmurje) and Ukraine (Transcarpathia).

Usually the term Landwehr implies units of limited fighting power. This was not the case in the Hungarian Honvéd. Although weaker in numbers - there were only three battalions per infantry regiment instead of the usual four in the Common Army - the troops were regular combat soldiers and were highly trained.

The Royal Hungarian Honvéd was divided into the Hungarian Honvéd and the Royal Croatian Home Guard (also called the Croatian-Slavonian Landwehr). The Croatian–Hungarian Settlement of 1868 granted the Croats the right to introduce Croatian as their working and command language within their units. In addition, the Croatian-Slavonian Honvéd units were subordinated to the Ban in Agram and not to the National Defence Minister in Budapest. However, both Ban and the Defence Minister were subordinated to the Prime Minister of Hungary .

=== Recruitment ===
In peacetime the officers of the Hungarian Honvéd either transferred from regular Hungarian regiments of the Common Army (K.u.K.) or graduated from the Ludovika Military Academy (a cadet school opened in 1872 specifically for the training of Honvéd officers) in Budapest. From 1869 onward the rank and file soldiers of the Honvéd were recruited as part of the general conscription process of the Common Army with individual Hungarian conscripts being allocated to specific K.u.K. or Honvéd regiments according to the numbers required. Entry to the Honvéd contingent or to the Common Army was decided by drawing lots. Enlisted at the age of 21 the Honvéd soldier usually undertook 24 months of active service before passing into the reserve. The commitment for compulsory service ended at the age of 36.

=== Landwehr districts ===
- I Landwehr District – Budapest

M.kir. I budapesti honvéd kerületi parancsnokság

- II Landwehr District – Szeged

M.kir. II szegedi honvéd kerületi parancsnokság

- III Landwehr District – Kassa (Kaschau; now Košice, Slovakia)

M.kir. II kassai honvéd kerületi parancsnokság

- IV Landwehr District – Pozsony (Pressburg; now Bratislava, Slovakia)

M.kir. IV pozsonyi honvéd kerületi parancsnokság

- V Landwehr District – Kolozsvár (Klausenburg, now Cluj-Napoca, Romania)

M.kir. V kolozsvári honvéd kerületi parancsnokság

- VI Landwehr District – Zagreb (Agram; now Zagreb, Croatia)

M.kir. VI zágrábi horvát-szlavon kerületi parancsnokság

== Formations and units of the Royal Hungarian Honvéd ==
The Royal Hungarian Honvéd was the standing army of Hungary. A part of the Honvéd was the Royal Croatian Home Guard (Kraljevsko hrvatsko domobranstvo), which consisted of 1 infantry division (out of 7 in the Honvéd) and 1 cavalry regiment (out of 10 in the Honvéd). Its order of battle at the outbreak of the First World War in 1914 was as follows (Hungarian designations listed in singular form):

- 6 Landwehr districts (honvéd katonai kerület)
- 2 infantry divisions (honvéd gyalogos hadosztály)
- 2 cavalry divisions (honvéd lovassági hadosztály)
- 4 infantry brigades (honvéd gyalogosdandár)
- 12 independent infantry brigades (honvéd önálló gyalogdandár)
- 4 cavalry brigades (honvéd lovasdandár)
- 32 infantry regiments (honvéd gyalogezred)
- 10 regiments of hussars (honvéd huszárezred)
- 8 field artillery regiments (honvéd tábori ágyúsezred)
- 1 horse artillery battalion (honvéd lóvontatású tüzérosztály)

In 1915, units of the whole Army that had nicknames or honorific titles lost them by order of the War Ministry. Thereafter units were designated only by their numerical designation, but the practice of honoric titles remained in the Honvéd.

All details relate to the year 1914:

=== Infantry divisions ===
- 20th Honvéd Infantry Division – Nagyvárad (Großwardein)
  Commander: Feldmarschalleutnant Friedrich von Csanády
  - 39th Honvéd Infantry Brigade – Nagyvárad
    Commander: Major General Koloman Patzák
  - 40th Honvéd Infantry Brigade – Szatmárnémeti (Sathmar)
    Commanding Officer: Colonel Béla Tarnáky
- 41st Honvéd Infantry Division – Budapest
  Commander: Feldmarschalleutnant Johann Nikić
  - 81st Honvéd Infantry Brigade – Budapest
    Commander: Major General Eugen Perneczky
  - 82nd Honvéd Infantry Brigade – Veszprém (Wesprim)
    Commander: Major General Rudolf Schamschula

=== Independent infantry brigades ===
- 45th Honvéd Infantry Brigade – Szeged
  Commander: Major General Rudolf Seide
- 46th Honvéd Infantry Brigade – Lugos
  Commander: Major General Lehel Festl
- 73rd Honvéd Infantry Brigade – Pozsony
  Commanding Officer: Colonel Paul von Nagy
- 74th Honvéd Infantry Brigade – Nyitra
  Commander: Major General Franz Cvrček
- 75th Honvéd Infantry Brigade – Kolozsvár
  Commander: Major General Karl Lippner von Nagyszentmiklós
- 76th Honvéd Infantry Brigade – Nagyszeben
  Commanding Officer: Colonel Adalbert Benke von Tardoskedd
- 77th Honvéd Infantry Brigade – Kassa
  Commanding Officer: Colonel Desiderius Molnár von Péterfalva
- 78th Honvéd Infantry Brigade – Miskolcz
  Commander: Major General Josef Foglár
- 79th Honvéd Infantry Brigade – Budapest
  Commander: Major General Koloman Tabajdi
- 80th Honvéd Infantry Brigade – Pécs
  Commanding Officer: Colonel Johann Háber
- 83rd Honvéd Infantry Brigade – Agram
  Commander: Major General Nikolaus Ištvanović von Ivanska
- 84th Honvéd Infantry Brigade – Osijek
  Commanding Officer: Colonel Daniel Kolak

=== Cavalry divisions ===
- 5th Honvéd Cavalry Division Budapest
  Commander: Feldmarschalleutnant Ernst Anton von Froreich-Szábo
  - 19th Honvéd Cavalry Brigade – Budapest
    Commander: Major General Ferdinand Graf von Bissingen und Nippenburg
  - 23rd Honvéd Cavalry Brigade – Zalaegerszeg
    Commanding Officer: Colonel Baron Colbert Zech
- 11th Honvéd Cavalry Division – Debreczen
  Commander: Major General Julius Freiherr Nagy von Töbör-Éthe
  - 22nd Landwehr Cavalry Brigade – Szeged
    Commanding Officer: Colonel Karl Czitó
  - 24th Landwehr Cavalry Brigade – Kassa
    Commanding Officer: Colonel Ladislaus Jóny von Jamnik

=== Infantry regiments ===
I.
- 1st Budapest Honvéd Infantry Regiment
  Commanding Officer: Colonel Ludwig Bartha – Bartha Lajos ezredes
- 2nd Gyula Honvéd Infantry Regiment
  Commanding Officer: Colonel Alexander Vinzenz von Vinczfalva – Vincfalvi Vincz Sándor ezredes
- 3rd Debreczen Honvéd Infantry Regiment
  Commander: Stephan Stadler – Stadler István ezredes
- 4th Nagyvárad Honvéd Infantry Regiment
  Commanding Officer: Colonel Sigmund Ránffy – Ránffy Zsigmond ezredes
- 5th Szeged Honvéd Infantry Regiment
  Commanding Officer: Colonel Desiderius Nónay – Nónay Dezső ezredes
- 6th Szabadka Honvéd Infantry Regiment
  Commanding Officer: Colonel Rudolf Kamenszky – Kamenszky Rezső ezredes
- 7th Versecz Honvéd Infantry Regiment
  Commanding Officer: Colonel Kornel Bernatsky – Bernatsky Kornél ezredes
- 8th Lugos Honvéd Infantry Regiment
  Commanding Officer: Colonel Julius Létay von Nyirjes – Nyirjesi Létay Gyula ezredes
- 9th Kassa Honvéd Infantry Regiment
  Commanding Officer: Colonel Julius Preinreich – Preinreich Gyula ezredes
- 10th Miskolcz Honvéd Infantry Regiment
  Commanding Officer: Colonel Samuel Daubner – Daubner Samu ezredes
- 11th Munkács Honvéd Infantry Regiment
  Commanding Officer: Colonel Rudolf Pillepić; von Lippahora – Lippahorai Pillepić Rezső ezredes
- 12th Szatmár Honvéd Infantry Regiment
  Commanding Officer: Colonel Martin Tahy von Tahvár – Tahváry Tahy Márton ezredes
- 13th Pozsony Honvéd Infantry Regiment
  Commanding Officer: Colonel Anton Pogány – Pogány Antal ezredes
- 14th Nyitra Honvéd Infantry Regiment
  Commanding Officer: Colonel Lazarus Formanek – Formanek Lázár ezredes
- 15th Trencsén Honvéd Infantry Regiment
  Commanding Officer: Colonel Heinrich Dormándy von Dormánd – Dormándi Dormándy Henrik ezredes
- 16th Beszterczebánya Honvéd Infantry Regiment
  Commanding Officer: Colonel Franz Hill – Hill Ferenc ezredes
II.

- 17th Székesfehérvár Honvéd Infantry Regiment
  Commanding Officer: Colonel Michael Gombos – Gombos Mihály ezredes
- 18th Sopron Honvéd Infantry Regiment
  Commanding Officer: Colonel Ludwig Brunswik von Korompa – Korompai Brunswick Lajos ezredes
- 19th Pécs Honvéd Infantry Regiment
  Commanding Officer: Colonel Otto Kleszky – Kleszky Ottó ezredes
- 20th Nagykanizsa Honvéd Infantry Regiment
  Commanding Officer: Colonel Georg Ritter von Szypniewski – Lovag Szypniewski György ezredes
- 21st Kolozsvár Honvéd Infantry Regiment
  Commanding Officer: Colonel Raimund Latzin – Latzin Rajmond ezredes
- 22nd Maros-Vásárhely Honvéd Infantry Regiment
  Commanding Officer: Colonel Árpád Schön – Schön Árpád ezredes
- 23rd Nagyszeben Honvéd Infantry Regiment
  Commanding Officer: Colonelleutnant Desiderius Szoták – Szoták Dezső alezredes
- 24th Brassó Honvéd Infantry Regiment
  Commanding Officer: Colonel Philipp Karleusa – Karleusa Fülöp ezredes
- 25th Agram Honvéd Infantry Regiment
  Commanding Officer: Colonel Anton Matašić – Matašić Antal ezredes
- 26th Károlyváros Honvéd Infantry Regiment
  Commanding Officer: Colonel Georg Petrović – Petrović György ezredes
- 27th Sziszek Honvéd Infantry Regiment
  Commanding Officer: Colonel Alois Petković – Petković Alajos ezredes
- 28th Eszék Honvéd Infantry Regiment
  Commanding Officer: Colonel Julius Simonović – Simonović Gyula ezredes
- 29th Budapest Honvéd Infantry Regiment
  Commanding Officer: Colonel Josef Ehmann – Ehmann József ezredes
- 30th Budapest Honvéd Infantry Regiment
  Commanding Officer: Colonel Rudolf Polgár – Polgár Rezső ezredes
- 31st Veszprém Honvéd Infantry Regiment
  Commanding Officer: Colonel Eduard Weeber – Weeber Ede ezredes
- 32nd Dés Honvéd Infantry Regiment
  Commanding Officer: Colonel Karl Parupka – Parupka Károly ezredes

=== Cavalry regiments ===
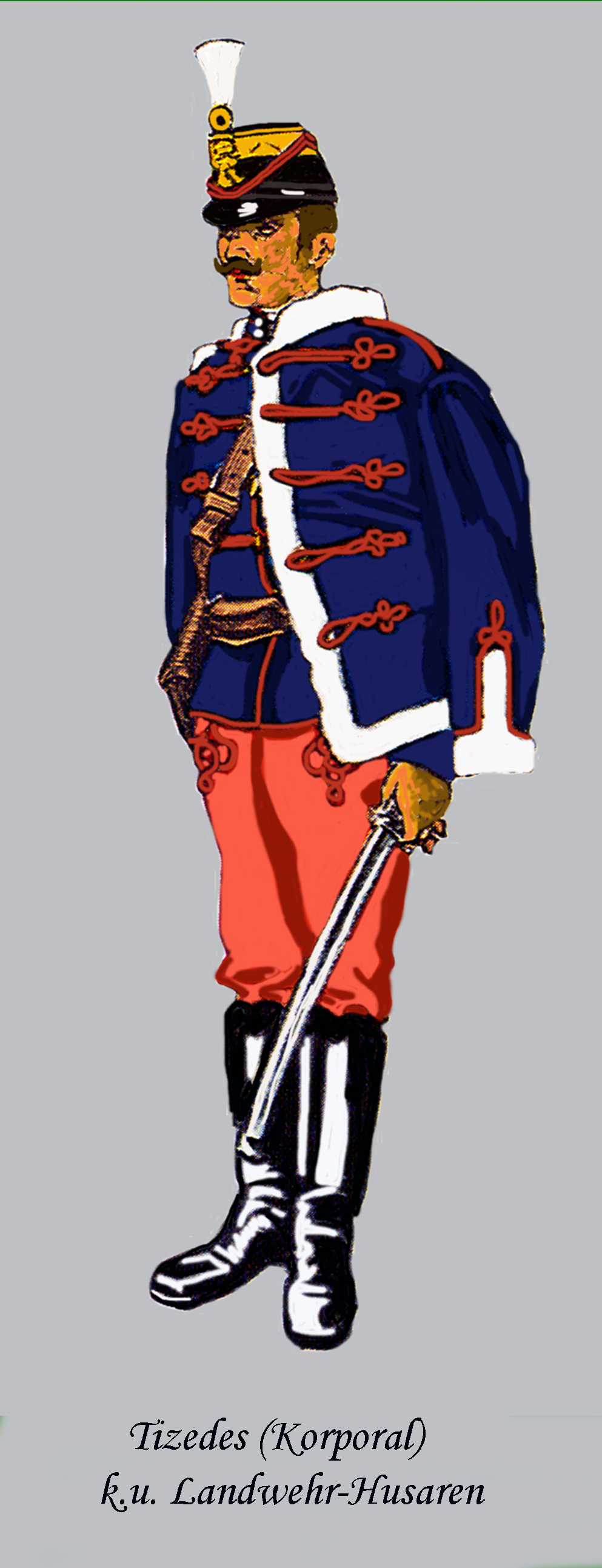
Hussar of the Honvéd with pelisse

- 1st Budapest Honvéd Hussars
  - 19th Honvád Cavalry Brigade – 5th Honvéd Cavalry Division
  Commanding Officer: Colonel Colbert Zech von Deybach Freiherr von Hart und Sulz – Debachi Zech Colbert harti és sulzi báró, ezredes
- 2nd Debreczen Honvéd Hussars
  - 22nd Honvéd Cavalry Brigade – 11th Honvéd Cavalry Division
  Commanding Officer: Lieutenant Colonel Johann Flór – Flór János alezredes
- 3rd Szeged Honvéd Hussars
  - 22nd Honvéd Cavalry Brigade – 11th Honvéd Cavalry Division
  Commanding Officer: Lieutenant Colonel Árpád Cserépy von Kisruszka – Kisruszkai Cserépy Árpád alezredes
- 4th Szabadka Honvéd Hussars
  - I and II Sqns, 23rd Honvéd Infantry Division
  - III and IV Sqns, 20th Honvéd Infantry Division
  - V and VI Sqns, 41st Honvéd Infantry Division
  Commanding Officer: Lieutenant Colonel Nikolaus Jankovich von Jeszenicze – Jeszeniczai Jankovich Miklós alezredes
- 5th Kassa Honvéd Hussars
  - 24th Honvéd Cavalry Brigade – 11th Honvéd Cavalry Division
  Commanding Officer: Colonel Paul Hegedüs – Hegedüs Pál ezredes
- 6th Zalaegerszeg Honvéd Hussars
  - 23rd Honvéd Cavalry Brigade – 5th Honvéd Cavalry Division
  Commanding Officer: Lieutenant Colonel Ladislaus Forster von Szenterzsébet – Szenterzsébeti Forster László alezredes
- 7th Pápa Honvéd Hussars
  - 23rd Honvéd Cavalry Brigade – 5th Honvéd Cavalry Division
  Commanding Officer: Colonel Johann Graf Lubienski – Gróf Lubienski János ezredes
- Pécs Honvéd Hussars 8
  - 19th Honvéd Cavalry Brigade – 5th Honvéd Cavalry Division
  Commanding Officer: Lieutenant Colonel Alexius Thege von Konkoly – Konkoly Thege Elek alezredes
- 9th Maros-Vásárhely Honvéd Hussars
  - 24th Honvéd Cavalry Brigade -1st Honvéd Cavalry Division
  Commanding Officer: Colonel Koloman Géczy von Garamszeg – Garamszegi Géczy Kálmán ezredes
- 10th Varazdin Honvéd Hussars
  - I and II Sqns, 36th Honvéd Infantry Division
  - III and IV Sqns, 42nd Honvéd Infantry Division
  - V and VI Sqns, 13th Honvéd Infantrybrigade
  Commanding Officer: Lieutenant Colonel Alois Hauer – Hauer Alajos alezredes

=== Field artillery regiments ===
- 1st Regiment of Artillery – 1. honvéd tábori ágyúsezred
  Garrison: Budapest – 4th Honvéd Infantry Division – I Landwehr District
  formed: 1913
  Commanding Officer: Colonel Anton Hellebronth von Tiszabeö – Tiszabeöi Hellebronth Antal ezredes
- 2nd Regiment of Field Artillery – 2 honvéd tábori ágyúsezred
  Garrison: Nagyszeben – 23rd Honvéd Infantry Division – V Landwehr District
  formed: 1914
  Commanding Officer: Lieutenant Colonel Ladislaus Thaisz – Thaisz Lázló alezredes
- 3rd Regiment of Field Artillery – 3 honvéd tábori ágyúsezred
  Garrison: Kassa – 39th Honvéd Infantry Division – III Landwehr District
  formed: 1914
  Commanding Officer: Lieutenant Colonel Heinrich Loidin – Loidin Henrik alezredes
- 4th Regiment of Field Artillery – 4 honvéd tábori ágyúsezred
  Garrison: Nyitra – 37th Honvéd Infantry Division – IV Landwehr District
  formed: 1914
  Commanding Officer: Lieutenant Colonel Alexander Mattanovich – Mattanovich Sándor alezredes
- 5th Regiment of Field Artillery – 5 honvéd tábori ágyúsezred
  Garrison: Maros-Vásarhely – 38th Honvéd Infantry Division – V Landwehr District
  formed: 1914
  Commanding Officer: Lieutenant Colonel Egon Stráner – Sztráner Jenő alezredes
- 6th Regiment of Field Artillery – 6 honvéd tábori ágyúsezred
  Garrison: Agram – 42nd Honvéd Infantry Division – VI Landwehr District
  formed: 1914
  Commanding Officer: Lieutenant Colonel Rudolf Sekulić – Sekulić Rezső alezredes
- 7th Regiment of Field Artillery – 7 honvéd tábori ágyúsezred
  Garrison: Hajmaskér – 41st Honvéd Infantry Division – VII Landwehr District
  formed: 1914
  Commanding Officer: Lieutenant Colonel Gustav Kapp – Capp Gusztáv alezredes
- 8th Regiment of Field Artillery – 8th honvéd tábori ágyúsezred
  Garrison: Hajmaskér – 20th Honvéd Infantry Division – II Landwehr District
  formed: 1914
  Commanding Officer: Colonel Albert Pohl – Pohl Albert ezredes
- 1st Honvéd Horse Artillery Division – honvéd lovastüzér osztály
  Garrison: Szeged – 11th Honvéd Cavalry Division – II Landwehr District
  formed: 1914

== Museum coverage ==
The history of Austro-Hungarian forces is documented in detail in the Military History Museum in Vienna, which was founded by Emperor Franz Joseph I as the Imperial-Royal Court Armaments Museum (k.k. Hofwaffenmuseum). In a special display cabinet in Hall V (the Franz Joseph Hall) of the museum, several uniforms of the Imperial Royal Landwehr are displayed, a relief on the rear of the cabinet shows the territories from which the Hungarian Landwehr and the Imperial Royal Landwehr recruited.

== Literature and sources ==
- Allmayer-Beck, Johann Christoph and Lessing, Erich (1974). Die K.u.k. Armee. 1848–1918 ("The Imperial and Royal Army 1848-1918"), Verlag Bertelsmann, Munich, 1974, ISBN 3-570-07287-8.
- k.u.k. Kriegsministerium Dislokation und Einteilung des k.u.k Heeres, der k.u.k. Kriegsmarine, der k.k. Landwehr und der k.u. Landwehr ("Location and Organization of the k.u.k. Army, the k.u.k. Navy, the k.k. Landwehr and the k.u. Landwehr") in Seidel's kleines Armeeschema – published by Seidel & Sohn, Vienna, 1914
- Rest, Stefan, Ortner, M. Christian and Ilmig, Thomas (2002). Des Kaisers Rock im 1. Weltkrieg ("The Emperor's Coat in the First World War"). Verlag Militaria, Vienna. ISBN 978-3950164206
- k.u.k. Kriegsministerium (1911/12). Adjustierungsvorschrift für das k.u.k. Heer, die k.k. Landwehr, die k.u. Landwehr, die verbundenen Einrichtungen und das Korps der Militärbeamten ("Dress Regulations for the k.u.k. Army, the k.k. Landwehr, the k.u. Landwehr, the Associated Organizations and the Corps of Military Officials"), Vienna.
