= Josef Werndl =

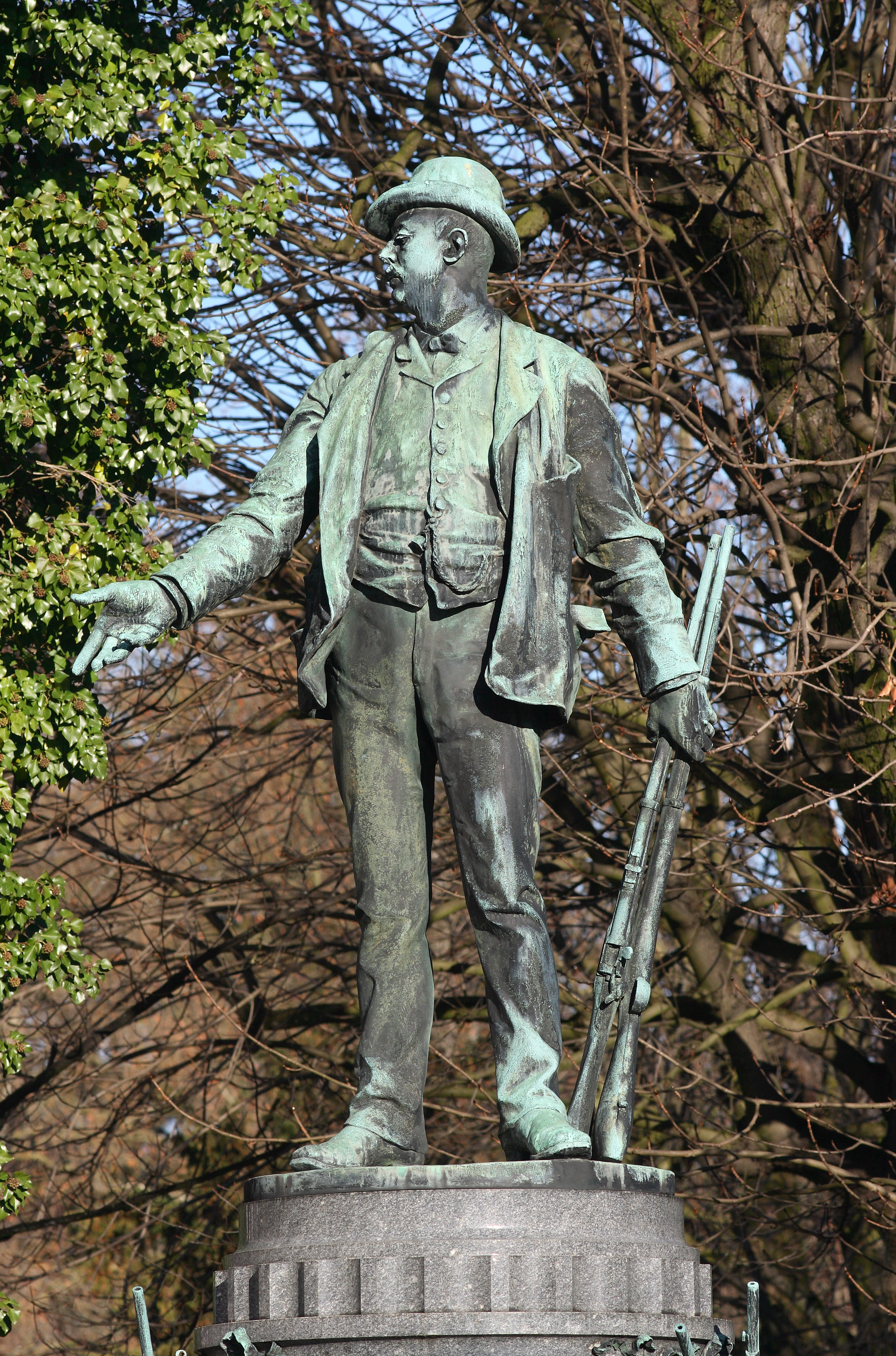
- Born: Josef Werndl; 26 February 1831; Steyr, Austrian Empire
- Died: 29 April 1889 (aged 58); Steyr, Austria-Hungary
- Occupation: Inventor

Signature
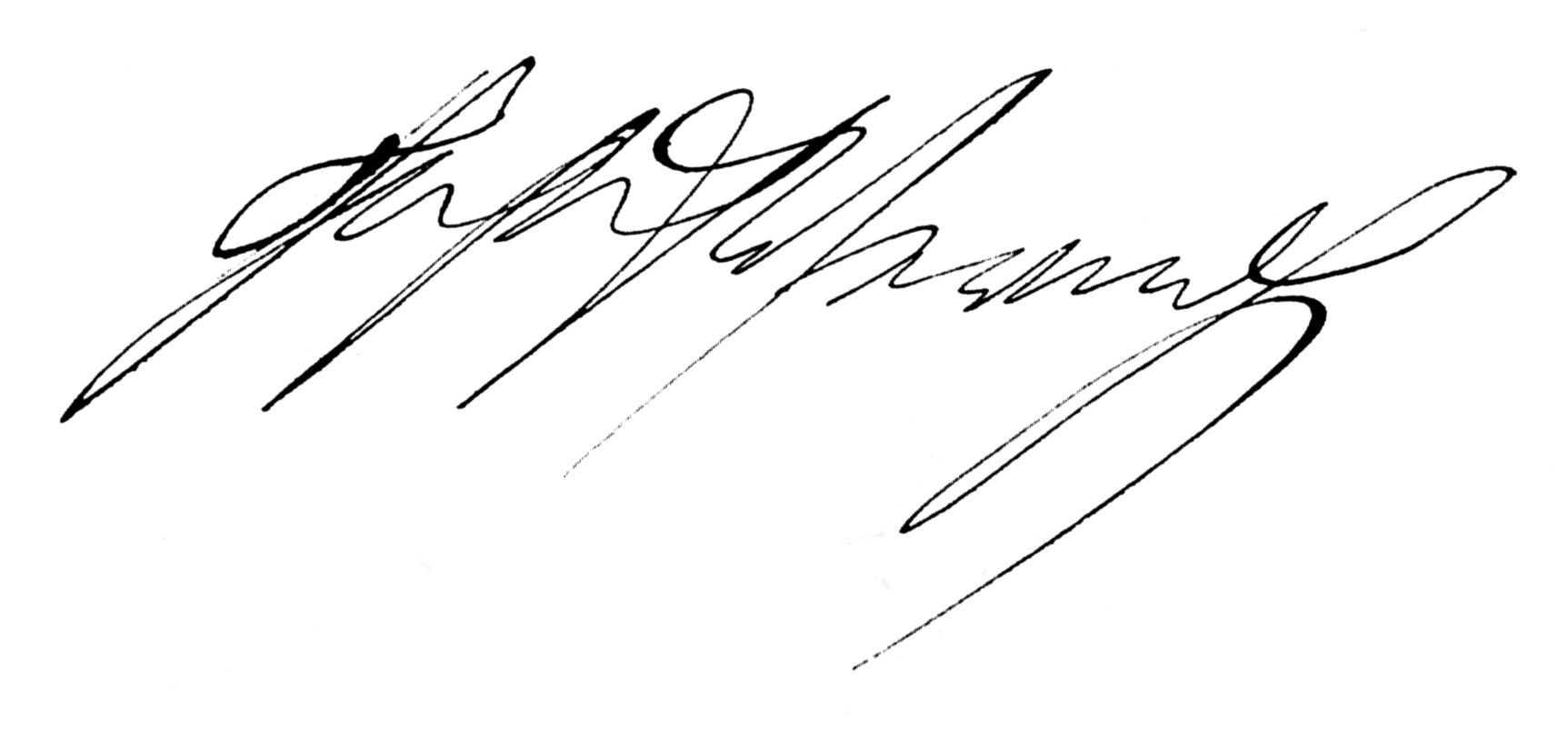

Josef Werndl was an Austrian arms producer and inventor. His most famous rifle design was the M1867 Werndl-Holub. He also owned the Steyr-Mannlicher from 1855.

== See also ==
- Ferdinand Mannlicher another Austrian inventor
