= Battle of Amiens order of battle =

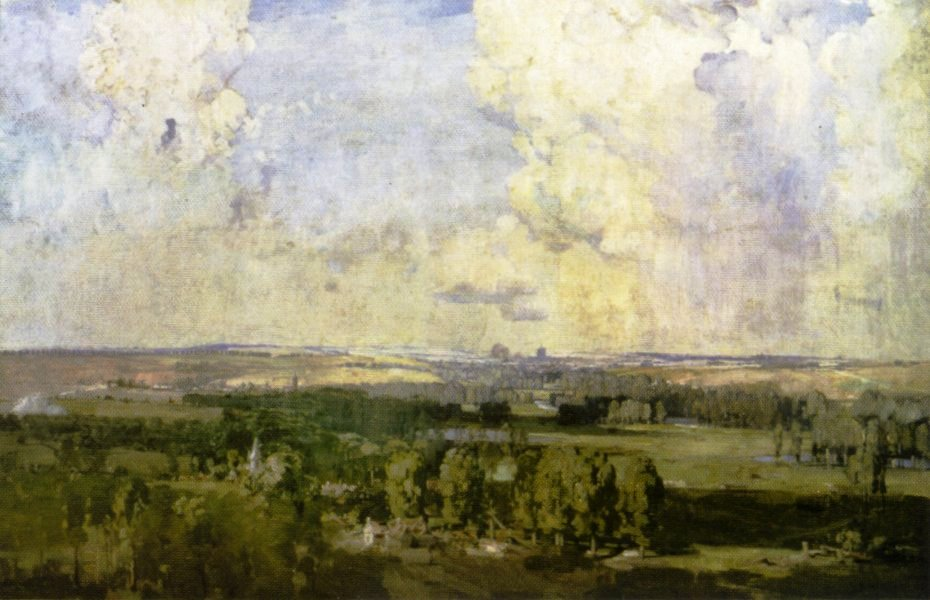
Amiens, the key of the west, painting by Arthur Streeton

The following is a list of forces involved in the Battle of Amiens of World War I fought from August 8 to August 11, 1918.

== Allies ==
Allied forces at Amiens were under the supreme command of General Ferdinand Foch.

=== Fourth Army ===
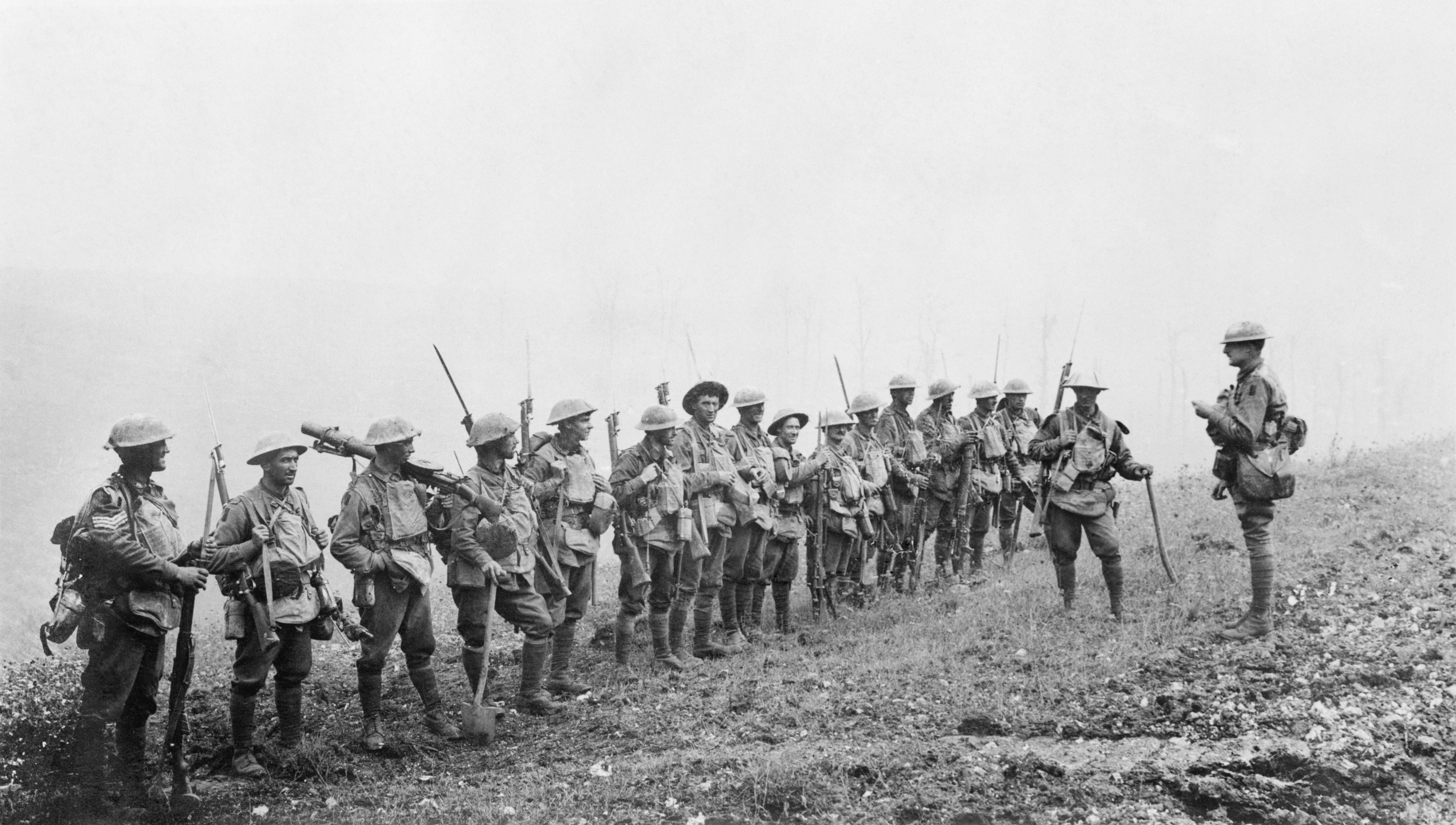
Australian infantrymen before the battle

General Sir Henry Rawlinson

III Corps – Lieutenant General Sir Richard Butler

47th (1/2nd London) Division
12th (Eastern) Division
18th (Eastern) Division
58th (2/1st London) Division
10th Tank Battalion – 36 Mark V tanks

Australian Corps – Lieutenant General Sir John Monash

1st Australian Division
2nd Australian Division
3rd Australian Division
4th Australian Division
5th Australian Division
33rd US Division
5th Tank Brigade – 2nd, 8th, 13th Bn Tank Corps with 108 Mark V tank; 15th Bn Tank Corps with 36 Mark V* Tank; 17th (Armoured Car) Bn (Austin Armoured Cars).

Canadian Corps – Lieutenant General Sir Arthur Currie

1st Canadian Division
2nd Canadian Division
3rd Canadian Division
4th Canadian Division
4th Tank Brigade – 108 Mark V tank, 36 Mark V* Tank

Cavalry Corps – Lieutenant General Sir Charles Kavanagh

1st Cavalry Division
2nd Cavalry Division
3rd Cavalry Division
3rd Tank Brigade – 72 Whippet tank of 3 Bn and 6 Bn Tank Corps

Reserve

17th (Northern) Division
32nd Division
63rd (Royal Naval) Division
9th Tank Battalion – 36 Mark V tanks

Royal Air Force air support

(Major General John Salmond)

V Brigade

15th (Corps) Wing – 110 aircraft
22nd (Army) Wing – 222 aircraft

IX Brigade

9th Wing – 2 fighter sqns, 2 bomber sqns, 1 reconnaissance sqn. (99 aircraft)
51st Wing – 3 fighter sqns, 2 bomber sqns. (101 aircraft)
54th Wing – 2 night-fighter sqns, 4 night-bomber sqns (76 aircraft)

III Brigade (available in support)

13th (Army) Wing – 136 aircraft

I Brigade (available in support) – 19 aircraft
X Brigade (available in support) – 19 aircraft

=== First Army ===
General Marie-Eugène Debeney

XXXI Corps – General Paul-Louis Toulorge

37th Division
42nd Division
66th Division
153rd Division
126th Division

IX Corps – General Noël Garnier-Duplessix

3rd Division
15th Colonial Division

X Corps – General Charles Vandenburg

60th Division
152nd Division
166th Division

XXXV Corps – General Charles Jacquot

46th Division
133rd Division
169th Division

II Cavalry Corps – General Felix Robillot

2nd Cavalry Division
4th Cavalry Division
6th Cavalry Division

=== Third Army ===
The French Third Army played a peripheral role in the battle and was commanded by Georges Humbert

XV Corps – General Jacques Élie de Riols de Fonclare

67th Division
74th Division
123rd Division

XXXIV Corps – General Alphonse Nudant

6th Division
121st Division
129th Division
165th Division

Division Aerienne

- I Brigade – 3 fighter groups, 3 bomber groups
- II Brigade – 3 fighter groups, 2 bomber groups
- Groupe Lauren – 2 night-bomber groups
- Groupe Weiller

Total: 1,104 aircraft

== German armies ==
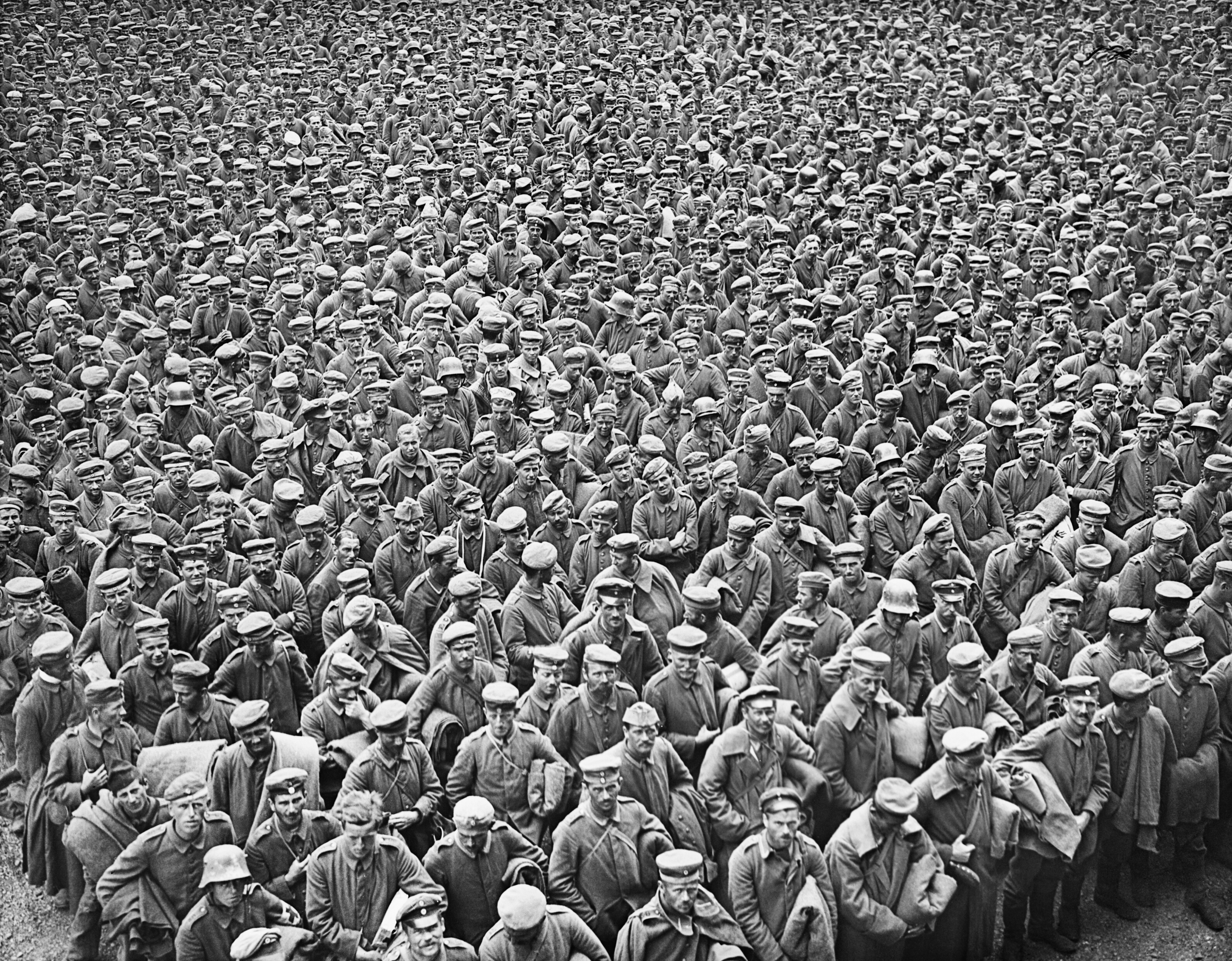
German prisoners of war after the battle

The German 2nd and 18th armies were part of Army Group Rupprecht, commanded by Crown Prince Rupprecht

=== 2nd Army ===
General Georg von der Marwitz

54th Corps – Generalleutnant Alfred von Larisch

27th Division
54th Reserve Division
233rd Division
243rd Division
26th Reserve Division – (From Seventeenth Army, 9 August)

XI Corps – Generalleutnant Viktor Kühne

13th Division
41st Division
43rd Reserve Division
108th Division
107th Division – (From Second Army reserve, 8 August)
21st Division – (From Second Army reserve, 9 August)
5th Bavarian Division – (From Seventeenth Army, 8 August)
38th Division – (From Sixth Army, 9 August)

51st Corps – Generalleutnant Eberhard von Hofacker

14th Bavarian Division
109th Division
117th Division
192nd Division
225th Division

Air Support

Jagdgruppe 2
Jagdgruppe Greim
Bombengeschwader 7
Fliegerabteilung (Lichtbildgerät) 40
Fliegerabteilung 17,33
Fliegerabteilung (Artillerie) 217,224,207,219,232,241,269
Schlachtstaffel 17

=== 18th Army ===
General Oskar von Hutier

III Corps – Generalleutnant Walther von Lüttwitz

24th Division
25th Reserve Division
1st Reserve Division
79th Reserve Division – (From Seventh Army, 9 August)

IX Corps – Generalleutnant Horst Ritter und Edler von Oetinger

2nd Division
11th Division
82nd Reserve Division

I Bavarian Corps – Generalleutnant Nikolaus Ritter von Endres (Corps was formed during the battle on 10 August)

Alpenkorps – (from Fourth Army, 10 August)
121st Division – (from Ninth Army, 10 August)

(The remaining corps of Eighteenth Army played only a peripheral role in the battle.)

I Reserve Corps – Generalleutnant Kurt von Morgen

75th Reserve Division
206th Division
119th Division – (Sent to 51st Corps, Second Army, 8 August)

XXVI Reserve Corps – Generalleutnant Oskar von Watter

17th Reserve Division
54th Division
204th Division – (Sent to I Bavarian Corps, 10 August)

XVIII Reserve Corps – Generalleutnant Ludwig Sieger

3rd Bavarian Division
105th Division
221st Division – (Sent to III Corps, 9 August)

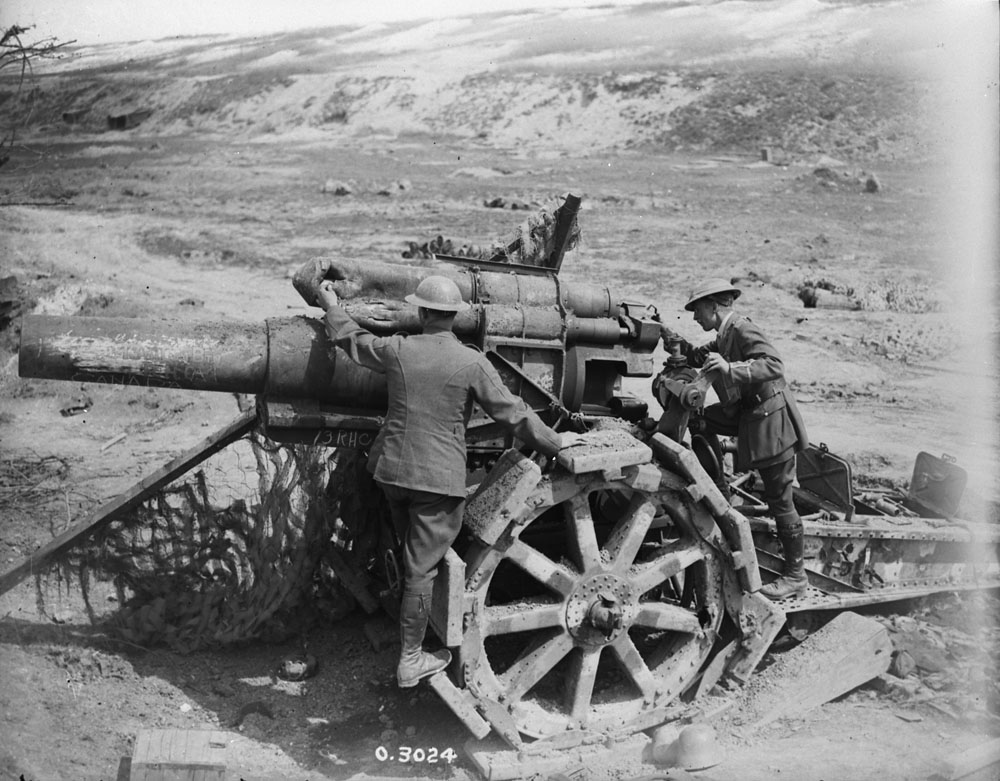
Captured German artillery piece

Luftstreitkräfte (air support)

Jagdstaffel 24, 42, 44, 78
Bombengeschwader 4
Fliegerabteilung (Lichtbildgerät) 23
Fliegerabteilung (Artillerie) 2, 245, 14,212,238,203
Schlachtstaffel 36

== Bibliography ==
- McCluskey, Alistair (2008). Amiens 1918: The Black Day of the German Army. Osprey Publishing (Campaign Series). ISBN 978-1-84603-303-2.
- Kearsey, A (February 1950). The Battle of Amiens 1918. Aldershot: Gale & Polden Limited (Reprinted by Naval & Military Press).
