= 24th Army Corps (Russian Empire) =

- Country: Russian Empire
- Allegiance: Imperial Russian Army
- Engagements: First World War; Eastern Front; Gorlice–Tarnów Offensive

The 24th Army Corps was an Army corps in the Imperial Russian Army.

== Composition ==
In July 1914:

- 48th Infantry Division
- 49th Infantry Division
- 1st Separate Orenburg Cossack Sotnia
- 2nd Separate Orenburg Cossack Sotnia
- 24th Howitzer Artillery Battalion
- 24th Sapper Battalion

== Part of ==
- 8th Army: 2 August 1914 – 23 January 1915
- 3rd Army: 17 February – 17 November 1915
- 8th Army: 15 December 1915 – 1 February 1916
- 4th Army: 13 February – 3 April 1916
- 10th Army: 2 May 1916 – 1 October 1916
- 9th Army: 22 October 1916 – 16 July 1917
- 4th Army: 10 August 1917 – December 1917

== Commanders ==
- Aleksandr Gerngross: 7 June 1910 – 20 January 1913
- Georgy Berchman: 29 January 1913 – 2 January 1914
- Afanasy Tsurikov: 2 January 1914 – End of 1916
- Konstantin Nekrasov: End of 1916 – August 1917
- Nikolai Bredov: 9 September 1917 – 30 September 1917
- Vjaceslav Trojanov: From September 1917
