= Gorlice–Tarnów offensive =

1915 Central Powers offensive on the Eastern Front of World War I

Coordinates: 49.7°N 21.2°E

- Part of the Eastern Front of World War I
- Gorlice–Tarnów breakthrough and Russian withdrawal
Date	2 May – 13 July 1915
Location	Gorlice and Tarnów area, south-east of Kraków, Galicia, Austria-Hungary
Result	Central Powers victory
Territorial changes	Russian forces retreat from Galicia and Polish salient

Belligerents
Austria-Hungary; German Empire	Russian Empire

Commanders and leaders
(German Empire) Erich von Falkenhayn (German Empire) August von Mackensen (German Empire) Hans von Seeckt (Austria-Hungary) Franz Conrad von Hötzendorf (Austria-Hungary) E. von Böhm-Ermolli (Austria-Hungary) Svetozar Boroević (Austria-Hungary) Paul von Brlog (Austria-Hungary) Archduke Joseph Ferdinand	Grand Duke Nicholas; Nikolay Ivanov; Radko Dimitriev

Units involved
(German Empire) 11th Army (German Empire) South Army (Austria-Hungary) 2nd Army (Austria-Hungary) 3rd Army (Austria-Hungary) 4th Army (Austria-Hungary) 7th Army	3rd Army; 4th Army; 8th Army; 9th Army; 11th Army

Strength
On 1 May 1915; Total: 1,248,319 men 1,440 machine guns 2,911 guns On 15 May 1915: Total: 1,502,844 men 1,636 machine guns 3,111 guns On 31 May 1915: Total: 1,613,360 men 1,884 machine guns 3,259 guns	On 1 May 1915; Total: 1,059,576 men 1,459 machine guns 1,756 guns On 15 May 1915; Total: 1,211,060 men 1,712 machine guns 2,369 guns On 31 May 1915; Total: 1,424,158 men 1,768 machine guns 2,383 guns

Casualties and losses
2 May – 13 July 1915; Total 487,821 men German Empire: 24,063 KIA; 66,540 WIA; 8,050 MIA; Total 98,653; Austria-Hungary: 44,191 KIA; 180,385 WIA; 164,592 MIA; Total: 389,168 men	2 May – 13 July 1915; Total 1,019,953 men 118,112 KIA; 402,346 WIA; 499,495 MIA

The Gorlice–Tarnów offensive during World War I was initially conceived as a minor German offensive to relieve Russian pressure on the Austro-Hungarians to their south on the Eastern Front, but resulted in the Central Powers' chief offensive effort of 1915, causing the total collapse of the Russian lines and their retreat far into Russia. The continued series of actions lasted the majority of the campaigning season for 1915, starting in early May and only ending due to bad weather in October.

Mackensen viewed securing a breakthrough as the first phase of an operation, which would then lead to a Russian retreat from the Dukla Pass, and their positions north of the Vistula.

== Background ==
In the early months of war on the Eastern Front, the German 8th Army conducted a series of almost miraculous actions against the two Russian armies facing them. After surrounding and then destroying the Russian 2nd Army at the Battle of Tannenberg in late August, Paul von Hindenburg and Erich Ludendorff wheeled their troops to face the Russian 1st Army at the First Battle of the Masurian Lakes, almost destroying them before they reached the protection of their own fortresses as they retreated across the border.

At the same time, the Austro-Hungarian Army launched a series of attacks collectively known as the Battle of Galicia that were initially successful but soon turned into a retreat that did not stop until reaching the Carpathian Mountains in late September. Over the next weeks, Russian troops continued to press forward into the Carpathian passes in the south of Galicia. In fierce winter fighting General Franz Conrad von Hötzendorf, the chief of staff of the Austro-Hungarian Army, attacked the Russians in an attempt to push them back. Both sides suffered appallingly, but the Russians held their line. By this time half of the Austro-Hungarian Army that had entered the war were casualties. Conrad pleaded for additional German reinforcements to hold the passes. German Chief of German Great General Staff Erich von Falkenhayn refused, but in April 1915 Conrad threatened a separate peace if the Germans would not help.

According to Prit Buttar, "...it did seem as if the Russian Army had been gravely weakened by the recent campaigns...both AOK and OHL knew about Russian losses and difficulties with ammunition supply. Therefore, merely reducing the pressure on the k.u.k. Army would not be sufficient; Falkenhayn wished to strike a blow that would permanently diminish the ability of the Russian Army to mount offensives in future..." Falkenhayn wrote Conrad on 13 April, "Your excellency knows that I do not consider advisable a repetition of the attempt to surround the Russian extreme (right) wing. It seems to me just as ill-advised to distribute any more German troops on the Carpathian front for the sole purpose of supporting it. On the other hand, I should like to submit the following plan of operations for your consideration...An army of at least eight German divisions will be got ready with strong artillery here in the west, and entrained for Muczyn-Grybów-Bochnia, to advance from about the line Gorlice-Gromnik in the general direction of Sanok."

Conrad met Falkenhayn in Berlin on 14 April, where final details of Falkenhayn's plan were agreed upon, and two days later orders were issued for the creation of the 11th Army. According to Buttar, the 11th Army would consist of the "...Guards Corps reinforced by the 119th Division, XLI Reserve Corps reinforced by 11th Bavarian Infantry Division, and X Corps. Archduke Joseph Ferdinand's 4th Army would be subordinated to the new German army. Eventually, 119th Infantry Division and 11th Bavarian Infantry Division were grouped together in Korps Kneussl, and additional troops in the form of the Austro-Hungarian VI Corps were added to the 11th Army." Buttar goes on to state, "Impressed by the resilience of German troops on the Western Front when the French attacked in late 1914 and again in early 1915, Falkenhayn had adopted the proposal of Oberst Ernst von Wrisberg...and ordered some divisions to give up one of their four regiments and to reduce their artillery batteries from six guns to four." These forces were used to create new divisions for the new 11th Army.

Conrad had to bow to Falkenhayn's conditions. The joint attack would be by an Austro-German Army Group commanded by a German, whose orders from Falkenhayn would be transmitted via the Austro-Hungarian command. The Group would contain the Austro-Hungarian 4th Army (eight infantry and one cavalry divisions) under Archduke Joseph Ferdinand, an experienced soldier. The Germans formed a new 11th Army made up of eight divisions, trained in assault tactics in the west. They were brought east on 500 trains.

The 11th Army was led by the former commander of the German 9th Army, General August von Mackensen, with Colonel Hans von Seeckt as chief of staff. They would be opposed by the Russian 3rd Army with eighteen and a half infantry and five and a half cavalry divisions, under General D. R. Radko-Dmitriev. Mackensen was provided with a strong train of heavy artillery commanded by Generalmajor Alfred Ziethen, which included the huge German and Austro-Hungarian mortars that had crushed French and Belgian fortresses. Airplanes were provided to direct artillery fire, which was especially important since ammunition was short on both sides: only 30,000 shells could be stockpiled for the attack. Another significant plus was the German field telephone service, which advanced with the attackers, thereby enabling front-line observers to direct artillery fire. To increase their mobility on the poor roads, each German division was provided with 200 light Austro-Hungarian wagons with drivers.

The German 11th Army was ready to start artillery operations by 1 May, with the Korps Kneussl deployed southwest of Gorlice, with the XLI Reserve Corps led by Hermann von François, Austro-Hungarian VI Corps led by Arthur Arz, and the Guards Corps led by Karl von Plettenberg, deployed south to north, while the X Corps was held in reserve. Joseph Ferdinand's 4th Army was deployed north of the Germans at Gromnik. The Russian 3rd Army was deployed with the 10th Army Corps led by Nikolai Protopopov, 21st Army Corps led by Jakov Shchkinsky, and 9th Army Corps led by Dmitry Shcherbachev, deployed south to north.

== The battle ==
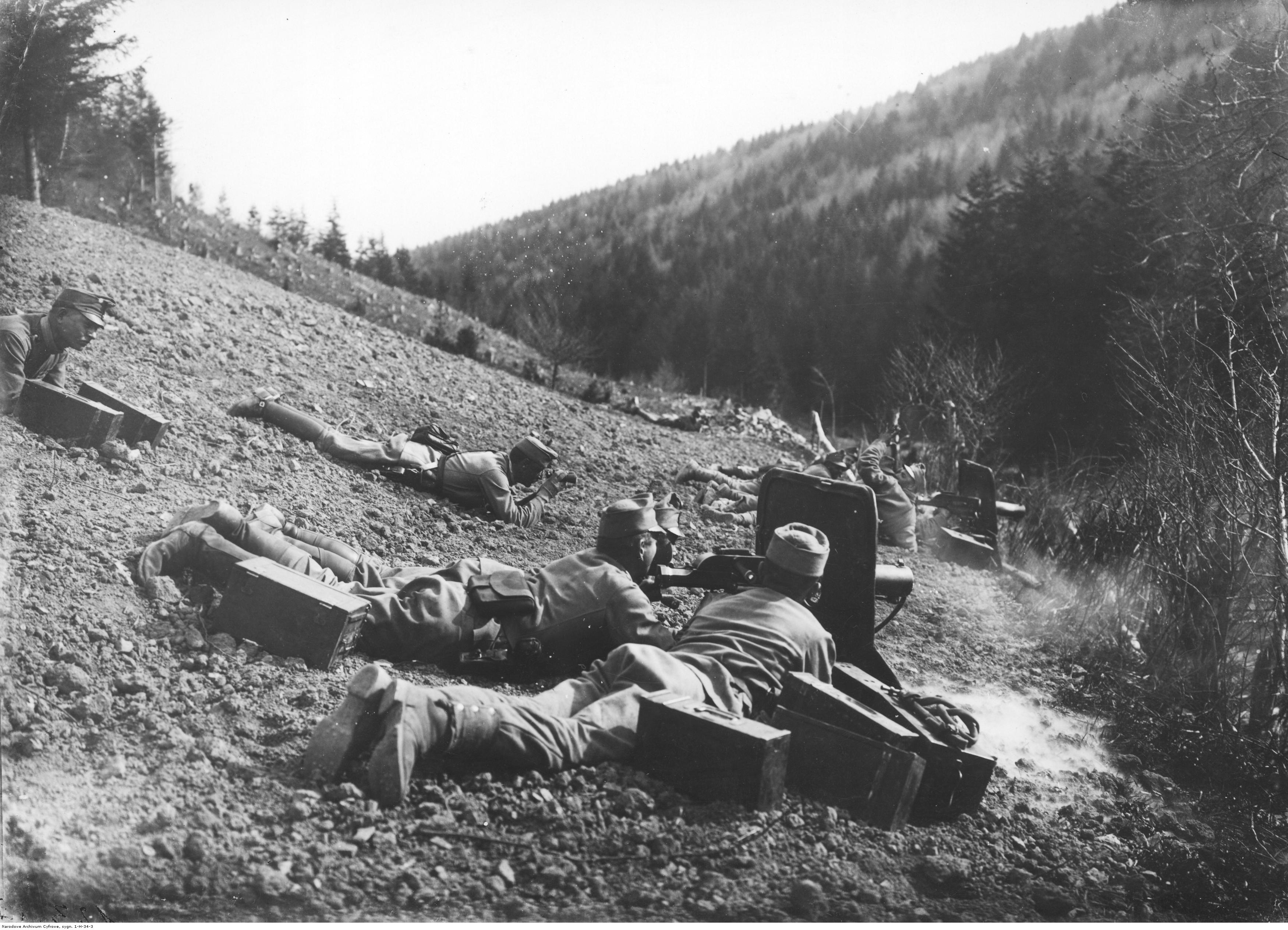
Predominantly Polish troops of the Austro-Hungarian Army fire on Imperial Russian forces entrenched on the Pustki hill in the Carpathian Mountains.

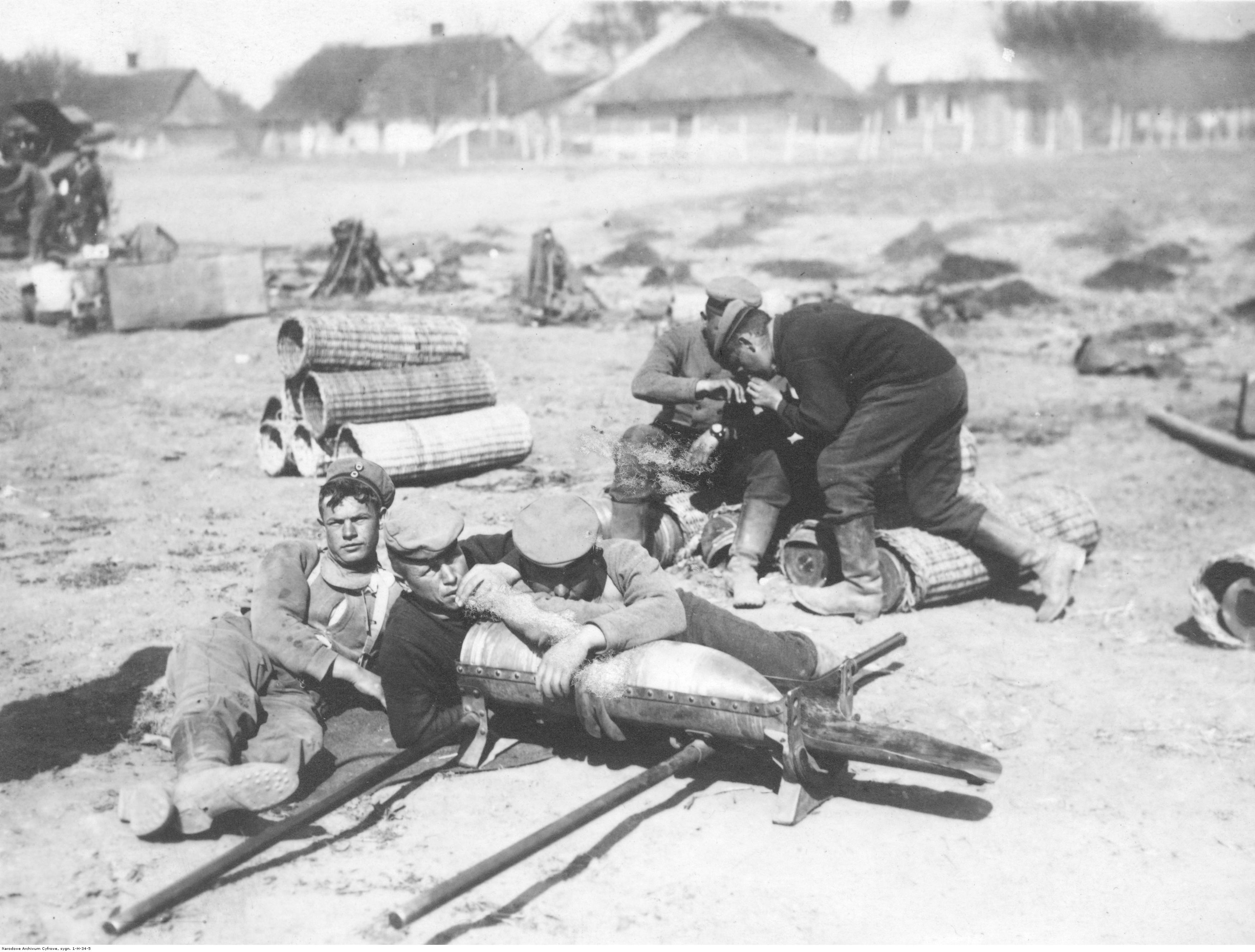
210 mm artillery shells used by Austro-Hungarian forces

Falkenhayn moved German Supreme Headquarters, OHL (Oberste Heeresleitung), to Pless in Silesia, an hour's drive from Austrian headquarters. To prevent spying, the local inhabitants were moved out of the buildup area. In the north the German 9th and 10th Armies made diversionary attacks that threatened Riga. On 22 April, the Germans launched the first poison gas attack near Ypres, divulging what might have been a decisive weapon merely to distract the Allies in the west. Mackensen had ten infantry and one cavalry divisions (126,000 men, 457 light guns, 159 heavy pieces, and 96 mortars) along the 42 km (26 mi) length of the breakthrough sector. Facing him were five Russian divisions consisting of 60,000 men but desperately short on artillery. For fire support, the Russians could only count on 141 light artillery pieces and four heavy guns. One of the four burst as soon as the battle began.

The Russian supreme commander, the Grand Duke Nicholas Nicholaevitch, learned that Germans had arrived on their flank but did not make a counter-move.

On 1 May, the Central Powers' artillery opened harassing fire, zeroing in their guns. The following morning at 0600 they began a sustained bombardment from field guns to heavy howitzers, at 0900 the mortars joined in. The huge mortar shells were especially terrifying, their blast killed men tens of meters from the explosion. The Russian defense lines were "... more ditches than trenches." According to François, "The mortars began their destructive work. The ground trembled, hell seemed to be let loose." According to Arz, "Our tension peaked as the infantry set off from their assault positions precisely at 10 o'clock." Mackensen had already defined "lines that should be reached in a uniform and if possible simultaneous manner, without preventing the troops from collectively moving on to secure the next sector where possible." After the first day, Mackensen reported, So far, everything is proceeding well", and on 3 May he reported 12,000 prisoners had been captured. François reported, "Gorlice was almost demolished; the section of the town that had been fighting resembled a sea of ruins." Mackensen then issued orders for the advance upon the River Wisłoka as the next objective, which constituted the Russian third and final line of defense. In the meantime, Russian reserves in the form of the 3rd Caucasian Corps, could not provide relief for at least a day. Yet, since this corps was committed to battle piecemeal, they proved of limited value in hindering the German advance.

Radko Dimitriev quickly sent two divisions to stem the Austro-German breakthrough, but they were utterly annihilated before they could even report back to headquarters. From the Russian point of view, both divisions simply disappeared from the map. On 3 May the Grand Duke Nicholas was sufficiently concerned to provide three additional divisions and to authorize a limited withdrawal. The Russian 12th Army Corps near the Dukla Pass began its withdrawal, as did the 24th Army Corps near Nowy Żmigród, signifying Russian control of the Carpathians was becoming ever more tenuous.

The Korps Emmich 20th Infantry Division, Korps Kneussl was renamed after Otto von Emmich took over command, captured Nowy Żmigród. Using an intact bridge over the Wisłoka, this division was able to advance to Wietrzno. By 5 May the attackers were through the three trench lines that had opposed them, by 9 May they had reached all assigned objectives. Grand Duke Nicholas permitted a limited withdrawal, but rejected advice to construct a well fortified position far behind the frontline and then to pull back to it. At this point the Russian counterattacks grew ever more desperate, often throwing brand new recruits into battle, some armed only with grenades or wooden clubs.

On 6 May, Mackensen noted, "Along the entire line from the Vistula far into the Carpathians, the enemy is retreating. Today I calculate we already have 60,000 prisoners." By 11 May, Emmich's men had reached the outskirts of Sanok, while François' reached the San River, an advance of 60 miles (97 km) in ten days. Mackensen's objective then became the securing of the San line, before advancing onwards to Rawa-Ruska. At this stage of the battle, according to Buttar, the Russian "10th and 24th Army Corps had effectively ceased to exist, while 9th Army Corps had lost 80 per cent of its establishment strength," and the 3rd Caucasian Corps had lost two thirds of its fighting strength. On 10 May, Vladimir Dragomirov had written Grand Duke Nicholas, "The strategic position of our forces is hopeless. In particular, I consider it my duty to note the position of 4th Army, which will become very dangerous if the enemy breaks through along the lower San."

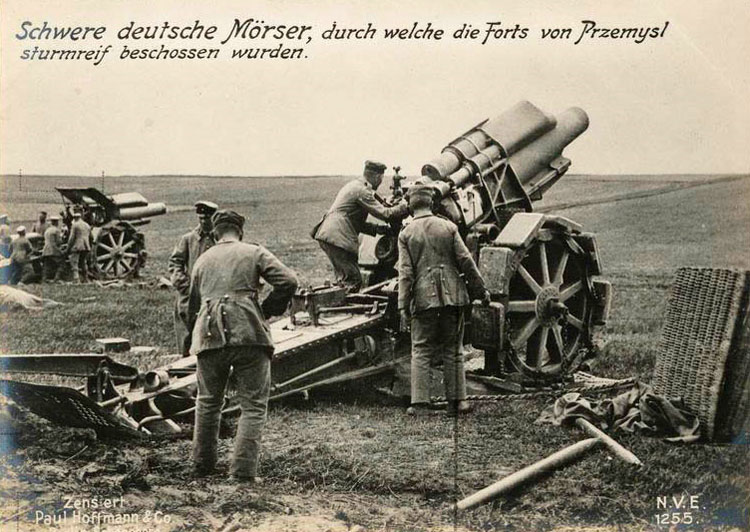
German heavy siege mortars at Przemyśl

On 12 May, Mackensen ordered bridgeheads established at Jaroslau and Radymno. By 15 May, Jaroslau had been captured and the Germans started crossing the San there on 17 May. Radymno was captured on 24 May. Dimitriev's 3rd Army's 21st and 12th Army Corps were transferred under the control of Aleksei Brusilov's 8th Army in an attempt by Grand Duke Nicholas to stem the German breakthrough. Soon after, Dimitriev was dismissed, replaced by Leonid Lesh.

On 28 May, the German XLI Corps 81st Infantry Division captured Stubno and Nakło north of the Przemyśl Fortress. On 31 May, the Germans started capturing the forts surrounding the fortress, and Brusilov ordered its abandonment. Kneussl's 11th Bavarian Infantry Division marched in unopposed on 3 June. Lesh's 3rd Army then retreated to the Tanew River, while Brusilov's 8th Army retreated towards Lemberg near Gródek. Furthermore, Brusilov was ordered to relinquish his 5th Caucasian and 12th Army Corps, so that the 3rd Army could form a southern flank in combination with their 2nd Caucasian and 29th Army Corps. This 3rd Army southern flank, led by Vladimir Olukhov, was supposed to prevent the 'Mackensen phalanx' from gaining any additional territory.

The Central Powers' next objective was a continued advance towards the east from a bridgehead at Magierów, and the ultimate recapture of Lemberg, which would sever lines of communication between the Russian Northwest and Southwest Fronts. Mackensen would not only command his 11th Army but also the Austro-Hungarian 4th Army, augmented with the X and XVII Corps, on his northern flank, and the Austro-Hungarian 2nd Army, augmented with the Beskidenkorps, on his southern flank. The 11th Army Order of battle, north to south, consisted of Karl von Behr's Corps, Emmich's X Corps, Eugen von Falkenhayn's XXII Reserve Corps, Plettenberg's Guards Corps, Arz's Austro-Hungarian VI Corps, and François' XLI Reserve Corps.

The attack commenced on 13 June, and by 17 June, the Germans had pushed the front line back 18 miles (29 km) to positions near Gródek. The German attack commenced again on 19 June, after the previous day was spent bringing forward their heavy artillery with matching aerial reconnaissance. The Russians reverted to a headlong retreat, and on 21 June the Grand Duke Nicholas ordered abandonment of Galicia. On 22 June Mackensen's Austro-Hungarians entered Lemberg after an advance of 310 km (190 mi), an average rate of 5.8 km (3.6 mi) per day. The Galician oil fields, crucial for the German navy, were soon back in production and 480,000 tons of badly needed oil was captured.

== Casualties and losses ==
The battles on the Bug and Zlota Lipa Rivers ended the Gorlice–Tarnów offensive, during which the armies of the Central Powers managed to inflict the largest defeat on the troops of the Russian Empire. The operation, which lasted 70 days, in terms of the number of troops involved (taking into account the replenishment of combat and non-combat casualties – 4.5 million men on both sides), in terms of casualties of the opponents (on both sides more than 1.5 million men), in terms of trophies, became the largest during the First World War.

Heavy casualties in the May battles forced the Russian armies to retreat from Galicia in early June 1915, and so hastily that the fortified positions prepared in the rear remained abandoned. The low stability of the troops of the Russian 8th Army, which left Lvov on June 22, became the reason for sharp reprimands from the front headquarters. In the Russian armies south of the Pilica River, 26 infantry divisions were transferred and put into battle in 70 days, two more guard divisions remained in reserve. But for the armies of the Central Powers, the victory came at a high price. The arriving reserves (6.5 divisions) brought into action during the offensive were fully utilized by the beginning of July. Although the Russian troops at certain moments of the battles lacked artillery shells (while the consumption of shells was the highest since the beginning of the war), they were well equipped with rifle cartridges and retained an advantage in the number of machine guns. Skillfully directed fire from hand weapons was very effective, and massive frontal assaults cost the victorious troops dearly, which was reflected in the gradual narrowing of the breakthrough front.

The available official information about the trophies of the warring parties allows to clarify the number of those who died in the operation. This number is made up of those killed and missing, not taken prisoner. The Austria-Hungary's Army Higher Command (AOK) and the German Supreme Commander of All German Forces in the East (Ober Ost) announced the capture in May – early July 1915 in Galicia, Bukovina and the Kingdom of Poland 3 generals, 1,354 officers and 445,622 soldiers of the Russian army, 350 guns, 983 machine guns. The Russian side officially announced the capture in May–June 1915 of 100,476 prisoners (of which 1,366 officers), 68 guns, 3 mortars and 218 machine guns of the Central Powers.

Based on these data, it can be assumed that 170,628 men died on the part of the Russian troops in the operation, and 140,420 men died on the part of the Central Powers. After the retreat of the Russian troops from Galicia, only within the military districts of Kraków, Lvov (Lemberg) and Przemyśl, 566,833 soldiers of the Russian, German and Austro-Hungarian armies who had died since the beginning of the war were officially buried. At the same time, the foundation was laid for the creation of a network of war memorials.

== Analysis ==
The Gorlice–Tarnów offensive and the subsequent offensive of the Northern armies of the AOK in Galicia is regarded as the largest, if not the main, victory of the Central Powers in the Russian theater of operations. For 10 weeks, the Russian armies of the Southwestern Front and the left flank of the armies of the Northwestern Front were thrown back in Galicia – across the Bug, Zlota Lipa and Dniester rivers, retaining only a small part of the territory that had been captured from Austria-Hungary, and in the Kingdom of Poland they retreated beyond the Vistula to Józefów, across the Tanew River, to Krasnystaw and Hrubieszów – approximately to the lines from which the Russian invasion of Galicia began in August 1914. Almost all the replenishment that came to the front was destroyed in the battles. The Russian Imperial army for the first time completely switched to strategic defense.

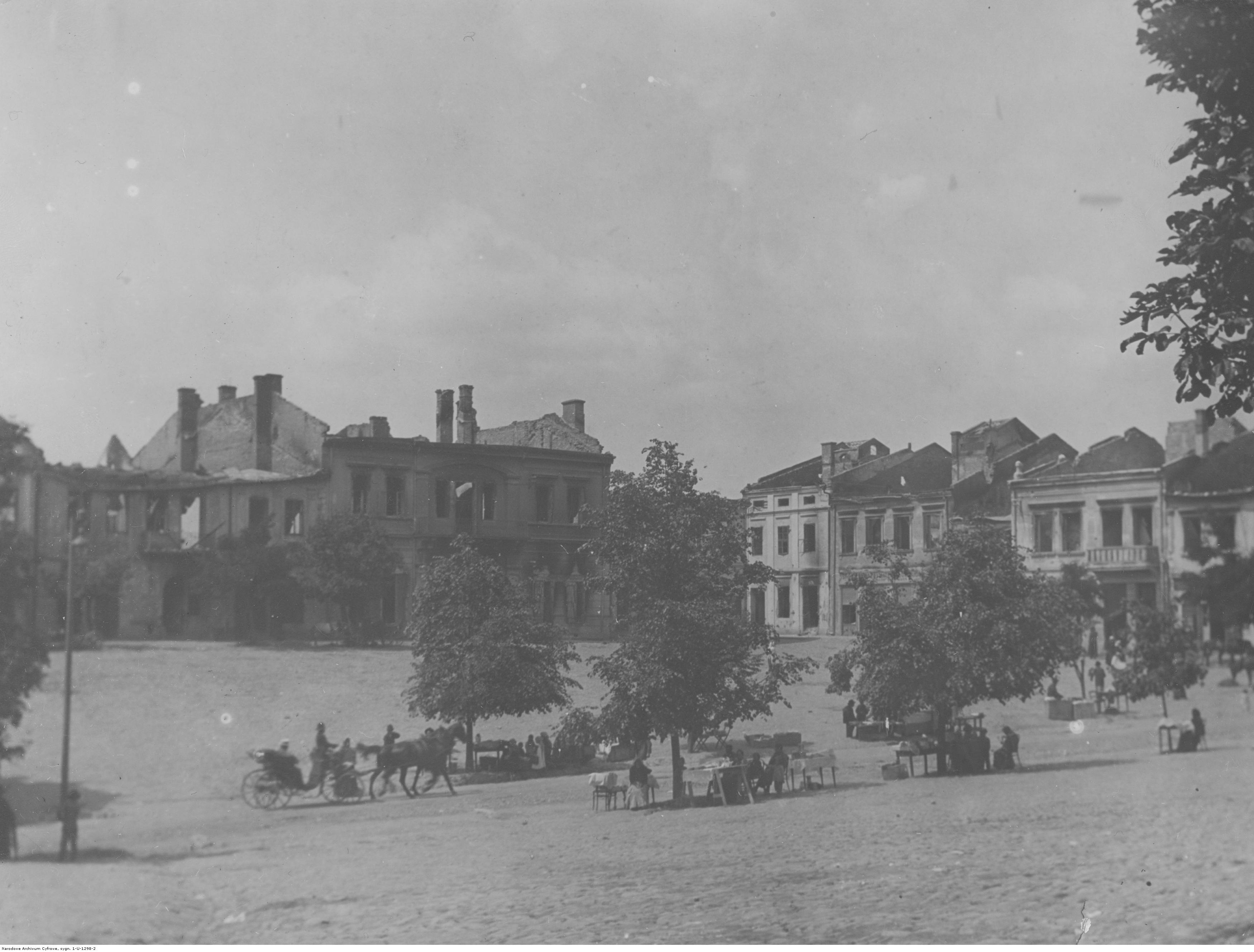
Women come out to sell produce and wares in the ruins of the Gorlice town market square.

The armies of the Central Powers failed to encircle the Russian armies and withdraw the Russian Empire from the war, but such a goal was not set before the start of the Gorlice–Tarnów offensive. The planning of the operation in Galicia by the AOK and Ober Ost, proceeded in stages, depending on the result achieved. At first, the goal was to oust the Russian armies from the Carpathian ridge, which was achieved after the retreat of the Russian troops behind the San and Dniester rivers; then the task of recapturing central Galicia and Przemysl was set, followed by the capture of Lemberg and the liberation of eastern Galicia. Finally, the goal was set to push the Russian troops as far north as possible between the Vistula and the Bug (therefore, A. von Mackensen considered the offensive of his army group in July–August 1915 to be a continuation of the Gorlice–Tarnów offensive ). The last goal, not achieved as a result of the Russian counterattack at Kraśnik, became the limit of the development of the Gorlice–Tarnów offensive, since, firstly, the further actions of the Central Powers against Russia became a general offensive along the entire front, and secondly, the Russian adopted a targeted defense with no attempt to turn the tide of the struggle and seize the initiative, thirdly, their counter measures induced the enemy to conduct separate preparations for the operation.

The reasons for the defeat of the Russian armies in the 1915 campaign, which became the most important operation, were usually called the overwhelming numerical superiority of the Central Powers, insufficient technical equipment and lack of artillery ammunition, and the excessive persistence of the Russia Headquarters in defending the conquered Galicia. One of the first researchers of the First World War in Russia, Andrei Zayonchkovski, saw the causes of defeats primarily in the shortcomings of the Russian troops command and control system: the lack of a single plan of action (and as a result, the initiative was ceded to the enemy), neglect of assessing the capabilities of the terrain and the position of the troops (as a result – "throwing suitable reserves from side to side"), weakness of technical training (creation of reserves, organization of supplies), biased attitude towards the enemy and his underestimation, distrust of the troops and individual commanders. All this resulted in the fact that “on the Russian side, there were, as it were, two independent organisms – the high command. … and the troops with their commanders", and "the doctrine of a concentrated strike, preached in the Russian army throughout the nineteenth century, in practice resulted in separately operating tentacles.

== Aftermath ==
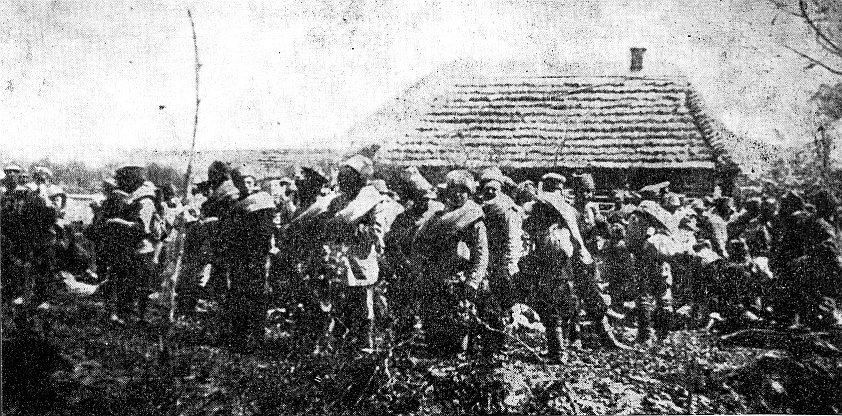
Russian prisoners of war after the battle

Seeckt proposed that the 11th Army should advance north towards Brest-Litovsk, with their flanks shielded by the rivers Vistula and Bug. Mackensen and Falkenhayn supported this strategy of attacking the Russian salient in Poland, and forcing a decisive battle. Ober Ost, led by Paul von Hindenburg and Erich Ludendorff, would attack towards the southeast, while Mackensen turned north, and the Austro-Hungarian 2nd Army attacked east.

The Grand Duke Nicholas issued orders that yielded to the pressure step by step, evacuating both Galicia and the Polish salient to straighten out their front line, hoping to buy the time to acquire the weapons they so desperately needed, for example 300,000 rifles. This enormous movement is known as the Great Retreat of 1915. Warsaw was evacuated and fell to the new German 12th Army on 5 August, and by the end of the month Poland was entirely in Austro-German hands (see Bug-Narew Offensive).

== Order of battle ==
Central Powers (arrayed north to south):

Austro-Hungarian 4th Army (Austro-Hungarian units unless otherwise indicated):

- Combined Division “Stöger-Steiner”;
- XIV Corps (German 47th Reserve Division, Group Morgenstern, 8th & 3rd Infantry Divisions);
- IX Corps (106th Landsturm & 10th Infantry Divisions);
- In reserve behind IX Corps: 31st Infantry Brigade (“Szende Brigade”), 11th Honved Cavalry Division.

German 11th Army (German units unless otherwise indicated):

- Guards Corps (1st & 2nd Guards Divisions);
- Austro-Hungarian VI Corps (39th Honved Infantry & 12th Infantry Divisions);
- XXXXI Reserve Corps (81st & 82nd Reserve Divisions);
- Combined Corps “Kneussl” (119th and 11th Bavarian Infantry Divisions);
- In reserve: X Corps (19th & 20th Infantry Divisions).

Austro-Hungarian 3rd Army,

- X Corps (21st and 45th Landwehr Infantry Divisions, 2nd Infantry & 24th Infantry Divisions)

Russian 3rd Army (north to south):

- 9th Army Corps (3 militia brigades, 3 regiments of 5th Infantry Division, 2 militia brigades, 3 regiments of 42nd Infantry Division, 70th Reserve Division, 7th Cavalry Division [in reserve]);
- 10th Army Corps (31st Infantry & 61st Reserve Divisions, 3 regiments of 9th Infantry Division);
- 24th Army Corps (3 regiments of 49th Infantry Division, 48th Infantry Division & 176th (Perevolochensk) Infantry Regiment of 44th Infantry Division);
- 12th Army Corps (12th Siberian Rifle Division, 12th & 19th Infantry Divisions & 17th (Chernigov) Hussar Regiment);
- 21st Army Corps (3 regiments of 33rd Infantry Division & 173rd (Kamenets) Regiment of 44th Infantry Division);
- 29th Army Corps (Brigade of 81st Infantry Division, 3rd Rifle Brigade, 175th (Batursk) Infantry Regiment of 44th Infantry Division & 132nd (Bender) Infantry Regiment of 33rd Infantry Division);
- 11th Cavalry Division.

Behind the Russian front lines: Scattered across the rear of 3rd Army:

- 3rd Caucasus Cossack Division, 19th (Kostroma) Infantry Regiment of 5th Infantry Division, 33rd (Elets) Infantry Regiment of 9th Infantry Division; 167th (Ostroisk) Infantry Regiment of 42nd Infantry Division;

Army Reserve:

- Brigade of 81st Infantry Division, 3 regiments of 63rd Reserve Division, Composite Cavalry Corps (16th Cavalry Division (less 17th Hussar Regiment), 2nd Consolidated Cossack Division); 3rd Don Cossack Division

== See also ==
- German Gorlice breakthrough
