= 84th Infantry Division (Russian Empire) =

- 84-я пехотная дивизия
- Active: 1914–1918
- Country: Russian Empire
- Branch: Russian Imperial Army
- Role: Infantry

The 84th Infantry Division (Russian: 84-я пехотная дивизия, romanized: 84-ya pekhotnaya diviziya) was an infantry division of the Russian Imperial Army. It was organized at Perm in the Kazan Military District on the basis of hidden frame elements from the 49th Infantry Division.

== Organization ==
- 1st Brigade
  - 333rd Glazov Infantry Regiment
  - 334th Irbitsk Infantry Regiment
- 2nd Brigade
  - 335th Anapa Infantry Regiment
  - 336th Chelyabinsk Infantry Regiment
- Artillery and Sappers
  - 84th Field Artillery Brigade
  - 22nd Separate Sapper Company
