= Battle of Dunajetz =

Central powers offensive at 1915 on the Eastern front

- Part of Gorlice-Tarnów Offensive in the Eastern Front during World War I
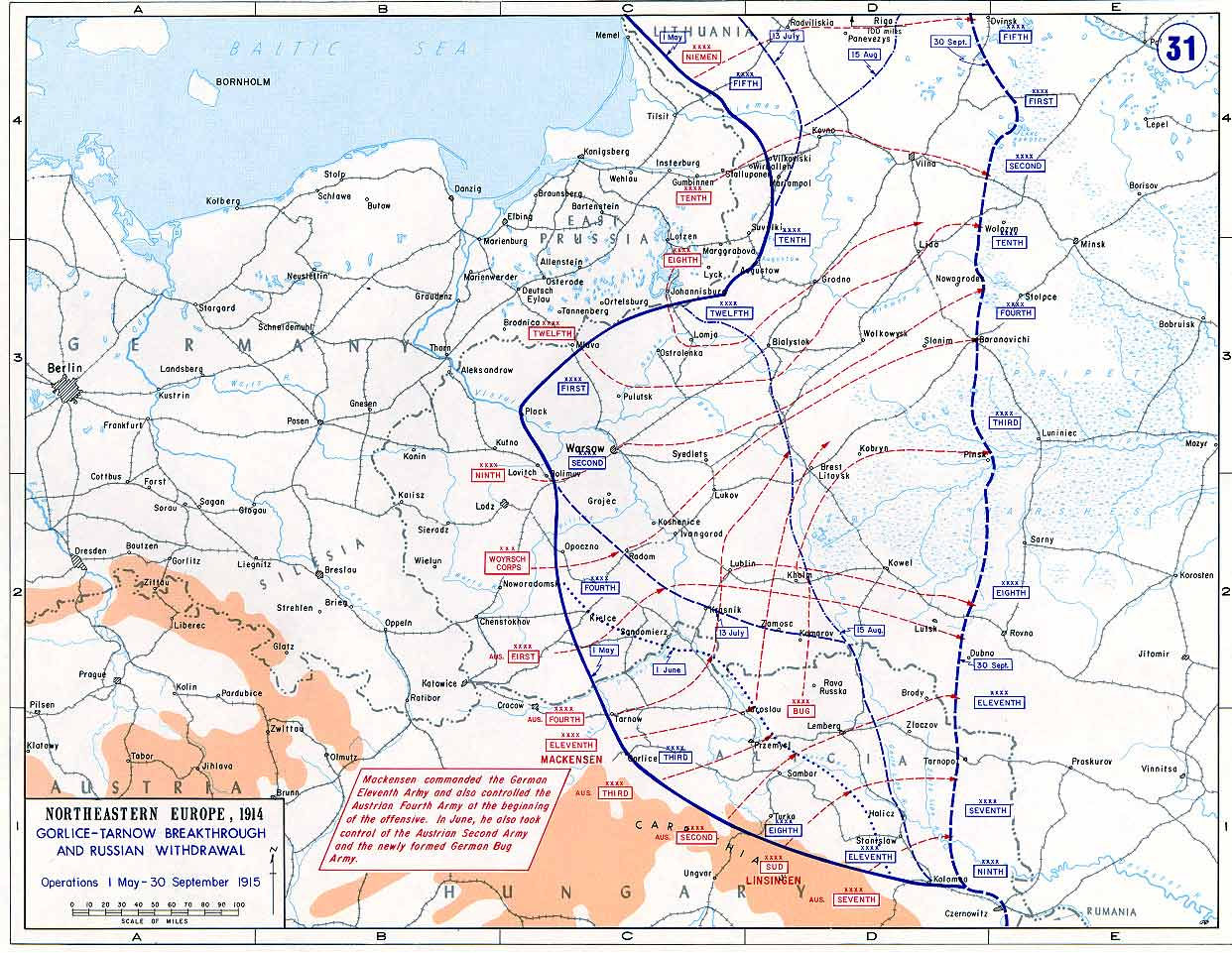
- Gorlice-Tarnów breakthrough and Russian withdrawal
Date	1–10 May 1915
Location	Eastern bank of river Dunajetz from river Vistula to Bartfeld village (in Slovakia) and east along Carpathian mountains to river Pruth; south-east of Kraków
Result	Central Powers victory

Belligerents
Russian Empire	German Empire; Austria-Hungary

Commanders and leaders
Grand Duke Nicholas; Nikolay Ivanov	(German Empire) Erich von Falkenhayn (German Empire) August von Mackensen (German Empire) Hans von Seeckt

Units involved
3rd Army	(German Empire) 11th Army (Austria-Hungary) 3rd Army (Austria-Hungary) 4th Army

Strength
On May 1: 401,041 men 525 machine guns 729 guns	On May 1: 700,299 men 734 machine guns 1,691 guns

Casualties and losses
100,000 prisoners 80 guns and 250 machine guns captured Unknown but very large number of KIA and WIA	36,570–90,000

The Battle of Dunajetz occurred in the May 1–10, 1915 as part of the Gorlice–Tarnów Offensive during World War I. The German 11th Army led by General August von Mackensen, with the support on the flanks by the Austro-Hungarian 3rd and 4th Armies, defeated the Russian 3rd Army. For the first time in the history of the First World War a heavily fortified and long-term defensive position was broken through during the Gorliсе offensive.

== Background ==
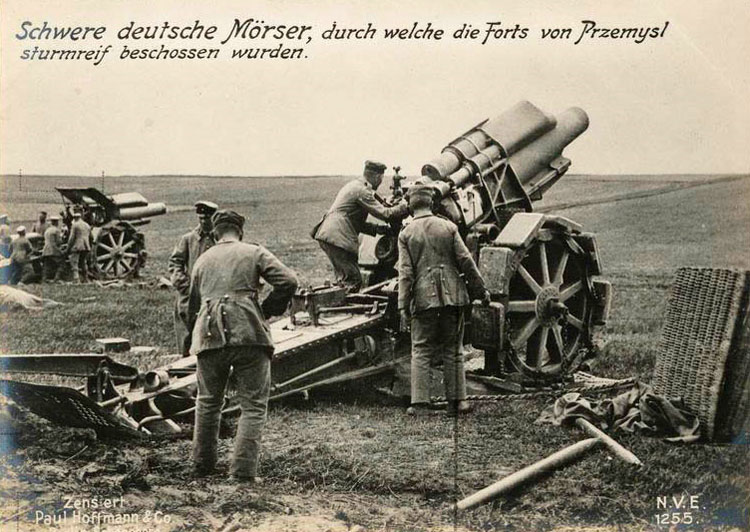
A german artillery piece

From August 1914 until early spring 1915, the German Empire prioritized war on the Western front to their Eastern front. This allowed Russian troops to steadily advance through Galicia, taking the Austrian territory, including the Hungarian fortress of Przemysl in March and seizing its weapons stores. Progress was not easy, though and the Russian Imperial Army suffered heavy casualties. No matter how hard they were hit, they managed to recover so quickly that Prince von Bulow reportedly once said, "fighting the Russians [was] like pounding a pillow.".

As a result of the Russian advance into Austria and chatter that Italy (which was neutral) was preparing to enter the war on the side of the Allies, the situation was seen as dire for the Austrian-Hungarian empire. The Central Powers reorganized their armies and Field Marshall von Hindenburg who believed that Russia "could be defeated in a single campaign, provided enough troops were at hand" gave Mackensen command of the newly created German 11th Army with Colonel Hans von Seeckt as his chief of staff.

Offensive operations of the Central Powers on the Russian front until May 1915 were carried out without numerical superiority, often with equality of forces. The key to the success of the Gorlice breakthrough was built on the creation of an overwhelming superiority in forces and means. "A quick and stunning strike in Galicia, carried out by large forces in order to achieve a decisive change in the situation in the eastern theater of operations" – this is how von Falkenhayn described the idea of the offensive on April 18, 1915. Having no advantage in manpower and machine guns in general, the Central Powers achieved an advantage in the front of the strongest of the Russian armies of the Southwestern Front and overwhelming superiority in the main attack zone (2.5 times in manpower and machine guns, almost 6 times in artillery).

Another factor of superiority and success was to be the artillery support of the operation. By the beginning of the fighting, each light battery had 1,200 shells, 15-cm howitzer batteries had 600, and batteries of 21-cm mortars had 500.

On April 27, Mackensen outlined the requirements for the operation to subordinate commanders: "The attack of the 11th Army, in order to achieve its goal, must be carried out as quickly as the operational situation requires. Only the speed of attack can prevent the enemy from gaining a foothold in the rear positions and systematically bringing up stronger reserves ... There are only two means for such actions: deep separation of the attacking infantry and rapid artillery pursuit by fire. Therefore, the attacking corps and divisions of the army should not think about a clearly defined task for the day, but strive by all means to advance as far as possible ... You should not expect that the attack along the entire front will go evenly ... but a faster advance of one sector of the front will facilitate the heavier and certainly slower progress in other areas and again drag them along with it." This deep separation was served by the allocation of an entire army corps to the reserve of the 11th Army.

The concentration of large enemy forces in front of the front of the 3rd Army did not go unnoticed by the Russian side. From prisoners and defectors, it became known about the offensive being prepared for approximately April 28, "the Austrians, who will be supported by the Germans." Already on April 26, the headquarters of the 3rd Army took measures to strengthen the defence at the Gorlice-Tarnów line, ordering the creation of reserves from units of the 70th and 81st Infantry Divisions. The front headquarters also took measures to return to their divisions the regiments previously allocated to other sectors, and on April 29 issued a directive to the armies on measures to form and concentrate reserves: the 3rd Caucasian Army Corps (21st and 52nd Infantry Divisions; a total of 23,859 combat personnel with 65 machine guns and 84 guns) entered the 3rd Army.

The construction of defensive lines, which began during the Carpathian battle, in January 1915, was also accelerated. The operation of the fortifications was hampered in the spring by groundwater floods and landslides. On April 29, the front headquarters ordered the 3rd and 4th Armies to start building the second line of defence.

The German raid into Courland diverted the attention of the Russian Headquarters from the Beskids and the Carpathians. The Austro-Hungarian Army High Command also took steps to disorientate the Russian side. On the night of April 30, the Austro-Hungarian 31st Landwehr Infantry Regiment crossed the Vistula River and, at the cost of heavy losses, captured a bridgehead in the rear of the Russian 9th Army Corps.

The concentration of forces of the Central Powers in the Gorlice sector, was known to the Russian command, which took, as far as possible, measures to strengthen the defence. For several days, the second echelon behind the positions of the Russian 10th Army Corps gathered troops equal to it in number (41,912 infantry and 985 cavalry, excluding rear services personnel), and even superior in machine guns and guns (121 and 118, respectively). This objectively reduced the superiority of the Central Powers, but the scale of this superiority was unknown to the Russian side, which played a fatal role. The headquarters of the 3rd Army and the Southwestern Front were going to repel an increased attack, similar to the February and March 1915 attempts by the Austro-Hungarian troops, possibly in the form of the last battles in the Beskids. Neither the commanders nor the fighters were ready for the fact that an entire German army would be brought into battle on a narrow sector of the front.

== Battle ==
A Gorlice breakthrough (German map)

=== May 1–2 ===
At dusk on May 1, the artillery of the three armies of the Central Powers opened fire on the Russian positions. By the morning of May 2, the shelling of the Gorlice sector took on the character of a hurricane. The head of the Russian 61st Infantry Division, Major General P. Simansky, noted: “Despite the well-known difficulty of loading, heavy guns, due to their large number and undoubtedly frequent installation, rattled like simple guns rattle with burst fire”. At 10:00 o'clock the German infantry went on the attack. Under the cover of dense artillery fire that destroyed trenches and shelters, some German gun crews rolled them out to support the infantry, approaching Russian positions up to 40–50 m, and fired direct fire at machine gun nests.

Several attacks were repulsed by the Russian 9th, 31st and 61st Infantry Divisions; at the same time, the 70th Infantry Division began to retreat from the right flank, which was attacked by the Austro-Hungarian IX Corps, and against the 10th Army Corps, the attacks were interspersed with new shelling, so that the trenches were completely destroyed. At 17:42, the corps commander N. Protopopov allowed the retreat to the rear position at nightfall. A brigade of the 63rd Infantry Division was introduced into the battle. However, the commander of the 3rd Army, Radko Dmitriev, “did not see sufficient motives” for retreat, ordered to continue to hold the already almost lost position and even go on the offensive from it after the approach of the divisions of the 3rd Caucasian Corps in a day or two.

However, by 20 o'clock the location of the divisions of the Russian 10th Army Corps was completely broken through, the dominant heights were captured by the Germans, and the reserves were used up. On the front of the Russian 9th Army Corps, the 70th Infantry Division was broken through and thrown back, and the 42nd Infantry Division restored the situation with difficulty. The breakthrough was carried out on the 60-km front, 2–4 km deep. 20,000 men were taken prisoners, the Germans captured 50 machine guns and 12 guns. At 21:30 Radko Dmitriev ordered the 9th Army Corps to restore the situation, the 10th Army Corps to strengthen in a new position.

=== May 3 ===
On May 3, von Mackensen united the 11th Bavarian, 20th and 119th Infantry Divisions into the corps of General of Infantry Otto von Emmich and reinforced the Guards Corps with a part of the field artillery of the 19th Infantry Division and ordered the offensive to continue. Despite the introduction of new units into battle from the Russian side, the Germans continued to successfully advance. Another 4,000 prisoners, 2 guns and 19 machine guns were captured.

On the night of May 3, Radko Dmitriev reported the situation to Ivanov, commander of the Southwestern Front; he informed Headquarters of the breakthrough of the German 11th Army and asked to send a division from the armies of the North-Western Front to the threatened area. Further withdrawal of the 10th Army Corps and the 70th Infantry Division to some extent of the Dunaets River and the beginning of the offensive of the Russian 11th Army (the 18th Army Corps was transferred from the 9th Army), during which 17 officers and 1,570 soldiers and 4 machine guns were captured. But help on the right flank was excluded: with strong attacks, the Central Powers completely fettered the units of the Russian 4th Army, only the 298th Mstislavsky Infantry Regiment was sent from it to the southern bank of the Vistula River.

At 14:49, the Supreme Commander-in-Chief, Grand Duke Nikolai Nikolayevich, informed Ivanov about the direction of one infantry division to him and recommended that the 33rd Army Corps be transferred from the 9th Army to the 3rd Army, and in case of danger he promised to reinforce the latter with a corps of the 7th Army (located in Odessa and Sevastopol). Ivanov convinced the Headquarters of the need to keep the 33rd Army Corps in the 9th Army, which was preparing to go on the offensive (it still took about two weeks to transport it), and on the same day, the Chief of Staff of the Supreme Commander, Infantry General N. N. Yanushkevich agreed to go over to the offensive of the 9th Army, at the same time explaining that “for the North-Western Front, distracted at the present time by the need to stop the unfolding German offensive on Riga ... it is extremely difficult, if not impossible, to further strengthen the South-Western front."

The commander of the 3rd Army formed a group of artillery general V. Irmanov (3rd Caucasian and 10th Army Corps), who was ordered to attack the Germans.

=== May 4 ===
On May 4, the Quartermaster General of the Headquarters, Infantry General Y. Danilov, spoke by telephone with the Chief of Staff of the Southwestern Front, V. Dragomirov, to report on the situation. The latter reported that the presence of the German 11th Army in the sector of the Russian 3rd Army had already been established, to which Danilov noted that there were enough reserves on the Southwestern Front that were not brought into battle (the Headquarters was completely unfamiliar with the current situation), and supported the plan for the speedy transition to the offensive of the 9th Army: "If the 9th Army really goes on the offensive without delay and achieves its goal, then it seems that even a partial withdrawal of the 3rd Army will be redeemed by this success". Dragomirov assured that the offensive would begin on May 7–8, but complained about the lack of shells.

However, the counterattack of the group of Irmanov was repelled by noon on May 4, the Germans broke through at the junction of the 3rd Caucasian and 24th Army Corps, other corps of the 11th Army also successfully advanced.

The 3rd Army suffered losses unprecedented in severity. The head of the 61st Infantry Division, Major General P. Simansky, reported to the headquarters of the 10th Army Corps: "I testify to the unconditional valour of the troops, who fought for three days under the fire of numerous enemy heavy artillery, inflicting enormous losses and severe wounds. The 61st Infantry Division faithfully fulfilled the order of the army commander: now there are only miserable remnants of it, it died in position".

=== May 5 ===
At night and early in the morning of May 5, telegrams were exchanged between the Russian Headquarters, the headquarters of the Southwestern Front and the headquarters of the 3rd, 4th and 8th Armies. Grand Duke Nikolai Nikolayevich, continued to believe that the 3rd Army, which received the 3rd Caucasian Corps, was able to regain its lost positions. But both Dmitriev and Ivanov more sensibly assessed the current situation: even the hopes of stopping the onslaught of the Germans became more and more illusory. Ivanov still hoped that the introduction into battle of the combined division from the regiments of the 3rd Army, sent in February–March to the 9th Army and now returning to their divisions, the occupation of the newly arrived 13th Siberian Rifle Division of a breakthrough on the left flank of the 9th Army Corps will help to avoid the withdrawal of the flank corps of the 3rd Army, which would entail the retreat of neighbouring armies. However, the headquarters of the 3rd Army insisted on the need to leave the bank of the Dunajetz River because of the threat of the Germans going to the rear. It was decided to withdraw the army of Radko Dmitriev, which necessitated the withdrawal of the left flank of the 4th Army and the right flank of the 8th Army.

At 10 o'clock on May 5, Dragomirov telephoned Danilov's opinion on the need to withdraw all the armies of the Southwestern Front. Such an arrangement would, in the opinion of the headquarters of the South-Western Front, make it possible to arrange and put the troops of the 3rd Army in order for a new offensive. Dragomirov doubted the possibility of the 3rd Army to hold its positions, and the withdrawal of the 4th Army under pressure from the Austro-Hungarians without reinforcing it with five divisions was considered a “matter of time”. Retreat across the San, he considered "the only expedient decision" that needed to be taken right now.

Danilov declared that he did not have the authority to make a decision that "brings the most fundamental break in the position of not only the armies of the Southwestern Front, but decisively affects the interests of the Northwestern Front." He believed that "the size of the failure of the 3rd Army ... does not seem so serious as not to try to catch on and stay in the nearest area ... There are still means in order to arrange and strengthen the situation without resorting to such radical means." “I believe that at the present time, on the eve of the possible appearance of neutral states on our side, it is extremely unprofitable and even dangerous to take such radical measures to change our strategic position that you are planning, unless these measures are dictated by extreme necessity, which I personally do not see. I will add to this that hardly anything will change with the retreat to the San River: we will have as much firearms as we do now; The management of withdrawal cannot be helped either: if it is bad in the 3rd Army, then it will remain so: the enemy, of course, will not give time to win, it is unprofitable for him".

Soon Ivanov received an order from Yanushkevich: "His Imperial Highness approved the thoughts expressed by General Danilov, categorically indicated that he did not allow the possibility of the withdrawal of the 3rd Army, in connection with which decisive and persistent measures must be taken to consolidate this line and strengthen named army on it."

The 62nd Infantry and 13th Siberian Rifle Divisions, united by the headquarters of the 29th Army Corps, were urgently sent to the 3rd Army. In addition, the 11th Cavalry Division was transferred from the 8th Army to the 24th Army Corps. Dmitriev set the immediate task of withdrawing the 12th and 24th Army Corps from the mountainous regions.

At the same time, the issue of developing a breakthrough was being decided at the headquarters of the Central Powers. The commander of the 11th Army, von Mackensen, believed that "the decisive and difficult struggle to win the entire operation is still ahead, and is connected with dislodging the Russian troops from the prepared positions of the first line and defeating their reinforcements and reserves." At 13:00 o'clock an order followed: covering the left flank with the forces of the 4th Army, connecting the IX and XIV Corps, the German 11th Army and the Austro-Hungarian 3rd Army to advance, pushing the Russian troops from the Carpathian ridge to the north.

By the end of the day, Emmich's corps stood at Żmigród, having contact with the Austro-Hungarian X and XVII Corps at Dukla and the VII Corps at Jaśliska. The Russian 3rd Army had to fight in the conditions of a gradual withdrawal to new positions. The expansion of the offensive front of the Central Powers aggravated the crisis, and now a retreat became inevitable. At 11:00 p.m., the army headquarters gave the order to withdraw the entire army.

=== May 6 ===
In the morning of May 6, the corps of the German 11th Army successfully moved forward, gradually crossing the Wisłok River. Deepening into the mountains overgrown with forests, the Emmich Corps advancing on Rymanów encountered the chaotically arriving masses of troops of the Russian 48th Infantry Division, which was pressed from the south by the Austro-Hungarian X Corps. The retreating units were thrown into confusion and some fled. The Austro-Hungarians captured the commander of the 48th Artillery Brigade, the chief of staff of the division, lieutenant colonel, the commander of the 192nd Rymnik Infantry Regiment and with them 1,300 soldiers, 15 machine guns, 30 light guns and 5 corps mortars. 64 officers and 2,566 soldiers with 5 guns managed to break out of the encirclement. Somewhat later, on May 12, Austro-Hungarian soldiers captured the head of the division, Lieutenant General Lavr Kornilov, wounded in the hand, and with him 7 staff officers. On May 7, the rout of the 48th Infantry Division was completed by the German 20th Infantry Division; another 3,500 soldiers were taken prisoner.

=== May 7 ===
The expansion of the offensive of the von Mackensen's army group to the entire front of the Russian 3rd Army, the attacks on the positions of the Russian 4th and 8th Armies, the ongoing withdrawal of Russian troops forced the Supreme Commander-in-Chief Grand Duke Nikolai Nikolayevich to pay close attention to the current situation. On May 7, he arrived in Chełm, where the headquarters of the armies of the Southwestern Front was located. However, the discussion of the situation on the ground was not fruitful. The Supreme Commander-in-Chief still considered the position of the armies of the Southwestern Front reliable and only ordered that the 15th Army Corps and the 5th Caucasian Army Corps be transferred to the front armies. In addition, the 8th Army was allowed to withdraw beyond the Carpathian Range, which shortened the front and made it possible to form reserves. In particular, the entire 21st Army Corps was withdrawn from the battle to the reserve.

Command and control on the Southwestern Front fell into complete decline. The actions of the army commanders were coordinated by the chief of staff of the armies of the front, Dragomirov, while he complained to the Headquarters about the inept actions of the commander of the 3rd Army, Dmitriev. The latter now and then criticized the corps commanders, expressing dissatisfaction with their actions. But no measures were taken to replace this or that commanding person at any level. After reviewing the general retreat plan, the commander of the 4th Army, General of Infantry Aleksei Evert, called the withdrawal from the position along the Nida River undesirable, and the proposed position was stretched, for the defence of which one more division of infantry and cavalry would be needed. The commander of the 8th Army, A. Brusilov, also stated that he would not be able to hold a new defensive line during the offensive of the superior forces of the Central Powers.

=== May 8 ===
On May 8, after negotiations between the chiefs of staff of the Russian 3rd, 4th and 8th Armies with the front headquarters, Ivanov decided to suspend the withdrawal of troops and give a day of rest. Adjutant General Prince D. Golitsyn came to the 3rd Army from the Supreme Commander-in-Chief, who conveyed to Dmitriev the order to "hold at all costs in the positions currently occupied." The latter ordered the troops of the army "to die in positions, but not to retreat.

On this day, von Mackensen sent the Austro-Hungarian 4th Army to Rzeszów and Sędziszów. On the northern bank of the Vistula against the Russian 4th Army, the 46th Landwehr Infantry Division from the Austro-Hungarian 1st Army went on the offensive. The Austro-Hungarian XIV and IX Corps reached Dębica, Wielopole Skrzyńskie and Frysztak. For Frysztak, a stubborn battle with the 3rd Caucasian Corps was waged by the Austro-Hungarian 10th Infantry Division and the German Guards Corps, which also captured the bridgehead on the Wisłok River. The 81st Reserve Division and Emmich's corps broke through the location of the Russian 24th and 12th Army Corps. The situation on the front of P. Lechitsky's 9th Army escalated. On the night of May 8, the Austro-Hungarian 7th Army, with the forces of the 30th Infantry Division, liquidated the Russian bridgehead and crossed to the northern bank of the Dniester River. The expansion of the German offensive line prompted Ivanov to send the 45th Infantry Division from the 4th Army to the 3rd Army and inform Dmitriev that the 8th Army could no longer help him.

=== May 9 ===
On May 9, Mackensen's army group fought stubborn battles on the Vistula River. Units of the Russian 58th Infantry Division attached to the 3rd Caucasian Corps were surrounded, 18 officers and 2,250 soldiers were captured. The troops of the Austro-Hungarian 2nd Army continued to push back the 8th and 17th Army Corps of Brusilov's army.

=== May 10 ===
On the night of May 10, the Russian Supreme Commander-in-Chief sent a telegram to Ivanov following the results of the trip of Adjutant General Golitsyn: “In view of the continuous attempts of the headquarters of the front entrusted to you to retreat for one reason or another, alternately in different sectors of the front, I categorically command – without my special instructions and the actual combat situation do not produce waste ... In general, I ask you to leave the idea of waste. ”

By this time, the Russian 48th Infantry Division of 24th Army Corps of the 3rd Army was driven back from the right bank of the Wisłok River. At the junction with the 3rd Caucasian Corps, there was a threat of a bypass. At dawn on May 10, the Russian 21st Army Corps went on the attack. The offensive of the 21st Army Corps was unexpected for the Germans. The 11th Bavarian Infantry Division was thrown back. However, the Russian 24th Army Corps not only failed to attack, but was driven back from the position, and soon the positions of the 12th Infantry Division of the 12th Army Corps were broken through on the left flank. After the retreat of the 49th Infantry Division, the left flank of the 10th Army Corps was thrown into confusion.

At 15:15 Brusilov announced that the 12th and 21st Army Corps were subordinate to the 8th Army and ordered them to "continue to withdraw without stopping." At 4 p.m., Dmitriev announced the failure of the counterattack and ordered the 3rd Army to retreat to the San River. The Central Powers pursued on the heels, the Austro-Hungarian 4th Army successively knocked out the 9th Army Corps from Pstrągowa, Laszki. Only at Dębica the Russians continued to defend stubbornly. The German 11th Army went on the offensive again. The Austro-Hungarian 3rd Army pushed back the 12th Army Corps.

In the evening, Ivanov, having received a number of telegrams from the 3rd Army, indicating that the retreat was already inevitable due to the almost complete extermination of troops in battles, allowed the 8th Army to begin the withdrawal of troops. Brusilov again stated that he would not be able to stay on the front of 60 km, and for a successful defence he needed not 11, but 20 divisions. Ivanov again began negotiations on the withdrawal of the 4th Army, the left flank of which stretched along the banks of the Vistula and went deeper and deeper into the rear and messages. Yanushkevich again objected both to the retreat and to the weakening of this army and complained that "the 8th army so easily gave up the passes that had come at such a high price." Negotiations between Dragomirov and Danilov were not productive: the proposal to withdraw the armies of the Southwestern Front beyond the San and Dniester rivers, without defending Przemysl, was not answered. Then Ivanov, under his own responsibility, gave the order to withdraw the 4th Army, the 3rd Army and the 8th Army.

Only at night was the directive of the Russian Headquarters finally received, which determined the immediate task of the armies of the Southwestern Front to hold the line along the San and Dniester rivers at all costs. Przemysl was declared not a fortress, but a section of the front, fortified in advance. “I ask the commander-in-chief of the armies South-West front, always keep in mind the sacrifices made by our valiant troops for the conquest of Galicia, why I put surveillance on his responsibility so that, without extreme need, not to give up extra space to the enemy, especially on the front of the 9th and 11th Armies, ”emphasized at the same time Yanushkevich.

=== Parallel developments ===
While Mackensen directed his troops against the Russians along the Dunajetz, Hindenburg occupied Russian forces in northern Poland and Kurland, so they could not be sent as reinforcements. Also, due to Russian attention being drawn to their line further south, Hindenburg moved to attack Warsaw.

== Outcome ==
The Central Powers had a number of military advantages going into this offensive. They were numerically and technologically superior. In addition, air superiority allowed them to carry out careful reconnaissance of Russian positions and well as drop bombs on the Russian trenches.

The German focus, at this time, was to break Russian morale and take the sector of land between Gorlice and Tarnow. This would enable them to march on Przemyśl Fortress from the North and join the Austro-Hungarians approaching from the East and southeast. They certainly succeeded in doing so. By the end of May, the Russians had been pushed back from the Carpathian mountains.
