= Stubienko =

- Village
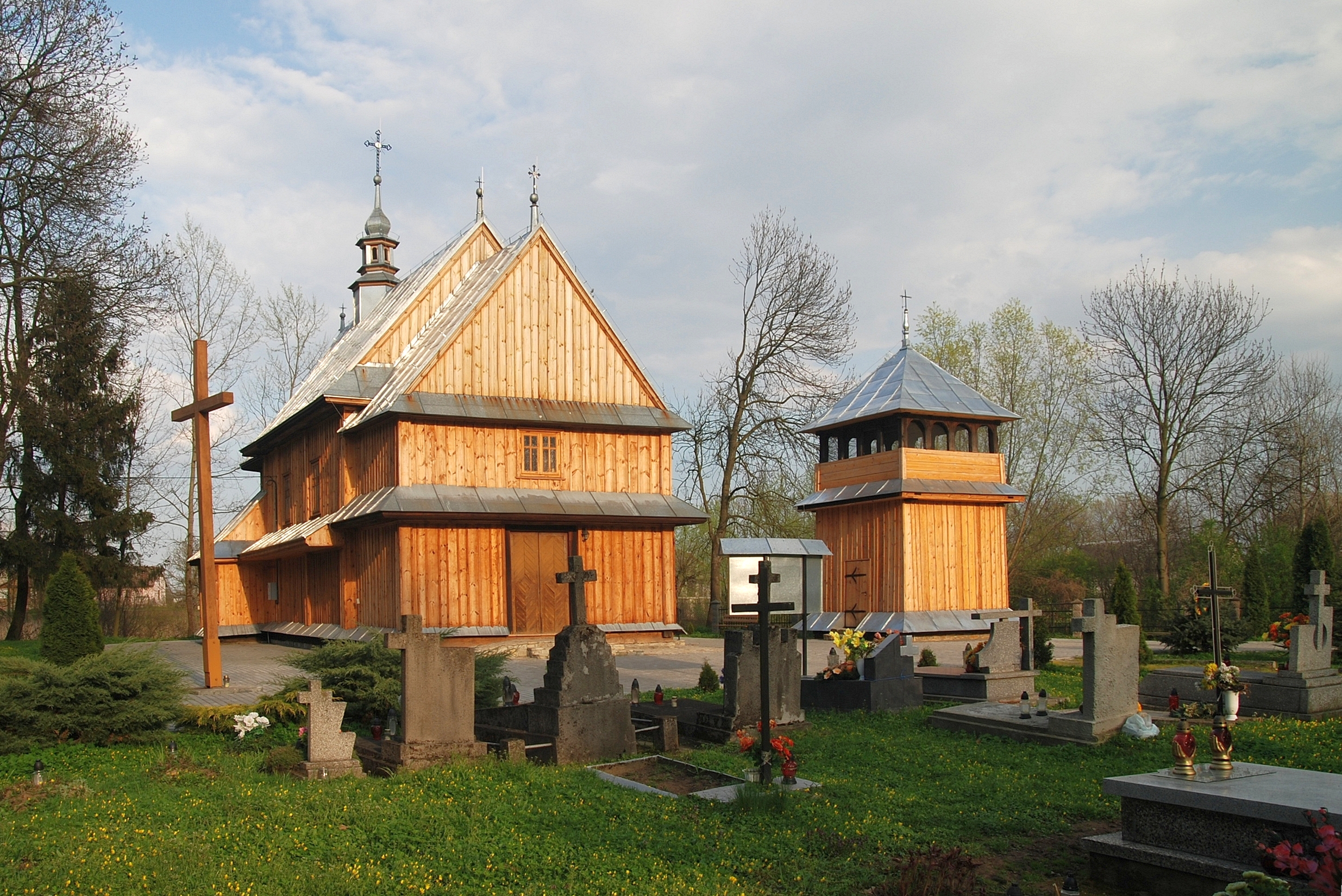
- Roman Catholic Exaltation of the Holy Cross Church

- Location within Poland
- Coordinates: 49°55′N 22°56′E
- Country: Poland
- Voivodeship: Subcarpathian
- County: Przemyśl
- Gmina: Stubno

Population
  - Total: 252

Stubienko [stuˈbjɛŋkɔ] is a village in the administrative district of Gmina Stubno, within Przemyśl County, Subcarpathian Voivodeship, in south-eastern Poland, close to the border with Ukraine.

== History ==
Until 1772, the village was part of Przemyśl County, Ruthenian Voivodeship of the Kingdom of Poland. In 1785, it had a population of 493 residents, including: 314 (63.7%) Ruthenians, 166 (33.7%) Poles, 13 (2.6%) Jews.

In 1880, the village belonged to Przemyśl county of the Kingdom of Galicia and Lodomeria of the Austro-Hungarian Empire, the village had 107 houses and 513 people, including: 513 (91%) Ukrainians, 66 (11.7%) Poles, 35 (6.2%) Jews.

In 1934–1939. the village belonged to the gmina of Stubno, Przemyśl County, Lwów Voivodeship of the Second Polish Republic and in 1939 had 760 residents, including 705 (92.7%) Ukrainians, 50 (6.6%) Jews, (0.66%) Poles,

During World War II, on September 12, 1939, the village was occupied by the German army, but in accordance with the Nazi-Soviet pact the village was transferred to the Red Army soon afterward. On 27 November, by the resolution of the Presidium of the Supreme Soviet of the Ukrainian SSR, the village within the county was included in the newly formed Drohobych region, and on January 17, 1940 — in the Medicovsky district.

In June 1941, after the beginning of the Nazi invasion of the Soviet Union, the village was occupied by the Germans. In July 1944, Soviet troops captured the village, and in March 1945, the village was transferred to communist Poland. Ukrainians were ethnically cleansed from the village and deported by Soviet-installed Polish communist authorities to the Ukrainian SSR as part of Operation Vistula; the rest in 1947 were deported to German land annexed by Poland.

Between, 1975-1998 the village belonged to Przemyśl Voivodeship and from 1998 to today, it is part of the Subcarpathian Voivodeship.
