= Armee-Abteilung Gronau =

Armee-Abteilung Gronau Army Detachment Gronau
- Flag of the Staff of an Armee Oberkommando (1871–1918)
- Active: 18 September 1916 – 27 March 1918
- Country: German Empire
- Type: Army
- Engagements: World War I

Armee-Abteilung Gronau (Army Detachment Gronau) was an army level command of the German Army in World War I. It was formed from Armee-Gruppe Gronau on 18 September 1916 and was disbanded on 27 March 1918. It served on the Eastern Front throughout its existence.

== Armee-Gruppe Gronau ==
Armee-Gruppe Gronau was formed from XXXXI Reserve Corps on 20 September 1915. It was named for its commander, General der Artillerie Hans von Gronau, former commander of XXXXI Reserve Corps. It was assigned to the Army of the Bug throughout its existence. On 18 September 1916 it was raised to the status of an Armee-Abteilung.

== Armee-Abteilung Gronau ==
On 18 September 1916 Armee-Gruppe Gronau was raised to the status of an Army Detachment as Armee-Abteilung Gronau. It remained on the Eastern Front until dissolved on 27 March 1918.

== Commanders ==
Armee-Gruppe / Armee-Abteilung Gronau was commanded throughout its existence by General der Artillerie Hans von Gronau.

== Glossary ==
- Armee-Abteilung or Army Detachment in the sense of "something detached from an Army". It is not under the command of an Army so is in itself a small Army.
- Armee-Gruppe or Army Group in the sense of a group within an Army and under its command, generally formed as a temporary measure for a specific task.
- Heeresgruppe or Army Group in the sense of a number of armies under a single commander.

== See also ==
- XXXXI Reserve Corps

== Bibliography ==
- Cron, Hermann (2002). Imperial German Army 1914–18: Organisation, Structure, Orders-of-Battle [first published: 1937]. Helion & Co. ISBN 1-874622-70-1.
- Ellis, John; Cox, Michael (1993). The World War I Databook. Aurum Press Ltd. ISBN 1-85410-766-6.
