= Alfred von Larisch =

German World War I general (1856–1856)

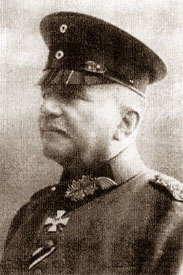
- Born: October 20, 1856; Danzig, West Prussia, Prussia
- Died: March 20, 1952 (aged 95); Obernkirchen, Lower Saxony, West Germany
- Education: Prussian Staff College
- Military career
- Allegiance: German Empire; Weimar Republic
- Branch: Imperial German Army; Reichsheer
- Service years: 1874 – 1919
- Rank: General of the Infantry
- Conflicts: World War I: Retreat to the Marne; First Battle of the Marne; First Battle of Champagne; Autumn battles, Champagne and Artois 1915; Second Battle of Champagne; Battle of Verdun; Eastern Front; Battle of Jugla; German spring offensive; Third Battle of the Aisne; Hundred Days Offensive; Battle of Amiens; Battle of Cambrai

Georg Karl Kuno Alfred von Larisch (1856–1952) was a German General of the Infantry during World War I. He commanded the 10th Division, the 81st Reserve Division, the Guard Ersatz Division, and the Generalkommando z.b.V. 54 on the Western and Eastern fronts.

== Early military career ==
Alfred von Larisch was born on October 20, 1856, in Danzig as the son of Prussian General Karl von Larisch and Marie von Cederstolpe. Larisch joined the Imperial German Army as a cadet serving in the 93rd Anhalt Infantry Regiment in 1874 at Dressau. From August 1883 he served in the 1st (Emperor Alexander) Guards Grenadiers in Berlin, being promoted to the rank of lieutenant in January 1884. From October of that year he attended the Prussian Staff College, graduating in July 1887, after which he returned to service in the 1st Guards Grenadier Regiment. In May 1885 he was promoted to the rank of captain, and was appointed a battalion commander. In May 1895 he was promoted to the rank of major and was transferred to the staff of the 2nd Guards Infantry Division, where he served as adjutant. He held this position until November 1897, when he became battalion commander in the 4th Guards Infantry Regiment.

In May 1901 he was appointed commander of the 7th Westphalian Jäger Battalion. In September 1902 he was promoted to the rank of lieutenant colonel and in September 1905 to the rank of colonel. He commanded said regiment until February 1906, when he became commander of the 4th Guards Regiment in Berlin. He commanded it for the next two years, until April 1908, when he was appointed Inspector-General of the Light Infantry; first temporarily and then, from August, permanently. In January 1910 he was promoted to the rank of Major General and in April 1912 to the rank of Lieutenant General. In October 1912 he was appointed commander of the prestigious 1st Guards Infantry Division, replacing Fritz von Below. He commanded said division for only a month, retiring in November.

== World War I ==
At the beginning of World War I, Larisch was reactivated and was given command of the 10th Division. The division was located on the Western front as part of the 5th Army, under the command of Crown Prince Wilhelm, participated in the capture of Longwy Fortress. After the First Battle of the Marne, the division held positions east of Verdun where it would remain until October 1916.

In October 1915, Larisch was transferred to the Eastern Front, where he was appointed commander of the 81st Reserve Division, with which he participated in the battles around Pinsk and the Pripyat wetlands. He commanded the division until April 1916, when he became commander of the Guard Ersatz Division. The division, back on the Western front, took part in the Battle of Verdun and subsequently in the Battles of Champagne. In April 1917, the division distinguished itself in the Second Battle of the Aisne, after which Larisch was awarded the 1st Class of the Order of the Crown for his services there.

In July 1917 Larisch and his division were temporarily transferred to the Eastern Front, becoming a part of the 8th Army under Okcar von Hutier. As part of the said army, he took part in the Battle of Jugla. After the successful operation they were transported back to the Western front where the division held positions around Verdun.

On January 20, 1918, Larisch was made commander of the Generalkommando z.b.V. 54. As such, he commanded a front section of the 7th Army north of the Ailette. Leading the 5th and 6th divisions, the 51st Reserve Division and the 6th Bavarian Reserve Division; Larisch went into the Third Battle of the Aisne. On June 25, 1918, Larisch was promoted to General of the Infantry.

In the Battle of Amiens, as part of the 2nd Army, Larisch was able to successfully defend his front section, north of the Somme, and was awarded the Pour le Mérite for this on August 25, 1918. From August 22 to September 2 he fought at Albert-Péronne, from September 8 for a month in the Hindenburg Line, participating in the battles of Cambrai and St. Quentin, and then in the Hermann Line. At the beginning of November 1918, Larisch withdrew to the Antwerp-Meuse area.

After the Armistice of 11 November 1918, Larisch led his subordinate divisions back home where his General Command was demobilized on January 18, 1919. Subsequently his reactivation was lifted and he retired again. He died in 1952 at Obernkirchen at the age of 95.

== Personal life ==
Larisch married Elisabeth von Sperber on April 10, 1896, and had the following children:

- Hermann Eugen Alfred Kuno Karl
- Marie Elisabeth Erika Margarete Asta
- Erich Wilhelm Peter Nikolaus
- Ursula

== Awards ==
- Prussian Service Award Cross
- Order of Albert the Bear, Knight 2nd Class
- House and Merit Order of Peter Frederick Louis, Commander
- Albert Order, Grand Cross
- Order of the White Falcon, Commander
- House Order of Lippe, Honor Cross 1st Class

=== Foreign awards ===
- Russia: Order of Saint Stanislaus, 3rd Class
- Siam: Order of the Crown of Thailand, Commander
