= Gaje, Podkarpackie Voivodeship =

Gaje
- Village
- Location within Poland
- Coordinates: 49°55′N 22°58′E
- Country: Poland
- Voivodeship: Subcarpathian
- County: Przemyśl
- Gmina: Stubno
- Postal code: 37-724
- Vehicle registration: RPR

Gaje [ˈɡajɛ] is a village in the administrative district of Gmina Stubno, within Przemyśl County, Subcarpathian Voivodeship, in south-eastern Poland, close to the border with Ukraine.
