= 7th Reserve Division =

7th Reserve Division (7. Reserve-Division)
- Active: 1914-1919
- Country: Prussia/Germany
- Branch: Army
- Type: Infantry
- Size: Approx. 15,000
- Engagements: World War I: Battle of Mons, Great Retreat, First Battle of the Marne, Battle of Verdun, Battle of the Somme, German spring offensive, Meuse-Argonne Offensive

The 7th Reserve Division (7. Reserve-Division) was a unit of the German Army, in World War I. The division was formed on mobilization of the German Army in August 1914. The division was disbanded during the demobilization of the German Army after World War I. The division was a reserve division of the IV Reserve Corps and was raised primarily in the Province of Prussian Saxony, the Duchy of Anhalt, and the Thuringian states.

== Combat chronicle ==
The 7th Reserve Division began the war on the Western Front. It fought in the opening campaigns against the Belgian Army and the British Expeditionary Force, including the Battle of Mons, and pursued the Allies during the Great Retreat, culminating in the First Battle of the Marne. After 1st Marne, the division held the line in the Aisne region until September 1915, when it went to the Champagne region. In 1916, it fought in the Battle of Verdun, where it suffered heavy losses. It then saw action in the later phases of the Battle of the Somme. The division occupied various parts of the line in 1917 and into 1918, before participating in the German spring offensive. After the offensive, it occupied various parts of the line again, facing Allied offensives and counteroffensives, and was hit by U.S. troops in the Meuse-Argonne Offensive. Allied intelligence rated it second class and noted that it was almost annihilated by the Armistice in November 1918.

== Order of battle on mobilization ==
The order of battle of the 7th Reserve Division on mobilization was as follows:

- 13.Reserve-Infanterie-Brigade
  - Magdeburgisches Reserve-Infanterie-Regiment Nr. 27
  - Reserve-Infanterie-Regiment Nr. 36
- 14.Reserve-Infanterie-Brigade
  - Reserve-Infanterie-Regiment Nr. 66
  - Reserve-Infanterie-Regiment Nr. 72
  - Reserve-Jäger-Bataillon Nr. 4
- schweres Reserve-Reiter-Regiment Nr. 1 (Heavy Reserve Cavalry Regiment No. 1)
- Reserve-Feldartillerie-Regiment Nr. 7
- 4. Kompanie/Magdeburgisches Pionier-Bataillon Nr. 4

== Order of battle on March 12, 1918 ==
The 7th Reserve Division was triangularized in April 1915. Over the course of the war, other changes took place, including the formation of the artillery and signals commands. The order of battle on March 12, 1918, was as follows:

- 14.Reserve-Infanterie-Brigade
  - Reserve-Infanterie-Regiment Nr. 36
  - Reserve-Infanterie-Regiment Nr. 66
  - Reserve-Infanterie-Regiment Nr. 72
  - Maschinengewehr-Scharfschützen-Abteilung Nr. 71
- 1.Eskadron/Reserve-Reiter-Regiment Nr. 1
- Artillerie-Kommandeur 95
  - Reserve-Feldartillerie-Regiment Nr. 7
  - Fußartillerie-Bataillon Nr. 52
- Stab Pionier-Bataillon Nr. 307
  - 4.Kompanie/Magdeburgisches Pionier-Bataillon Nr. 4
  - Pionier-Kompanie Nr. 248
  - Minenwerfer-Kompanie Nr. 207
- Divisions-Nachrichten-Kommandeur 407
