= Kowaliki, Podkarpackie Voivodeship =

Kowaliki
- Settlement
- Location within Poland
- Coordinates: 49°53′59″N 23°2′48″E
- Country: Poland
- Voivodeship: Subcarpathian
- County: Przemyśl
- Gmina: Stubno

Kowaliki [kɔvaˈlʲikʲi] is a settlement in the administrative district of Gmina Stubno, within Przemyśl County, Subcarpathian Voivodeship, in south-eastern Poland, close to the border with Ukraine.
