= Chałupki Dusowskie =

- Village
- Location within Poland
- Coordinates: 49°53′N 22°54′E
- Country: Poland
- Voivodeship: Subcarpathian
- County: Przemyśl
- Gmina: Stubno

Chałupki Dusowskie [xaˈwupkʲi duˈsɔfskʲɛ] is a village in the administrative district of Gmina Stubno, within Przemyśl County, Subcarpathian Voivodeship, in south-eastern Poland, close to the border with Ukraine.
