= Wolfgang von Gronau =

German diplomat and aviator

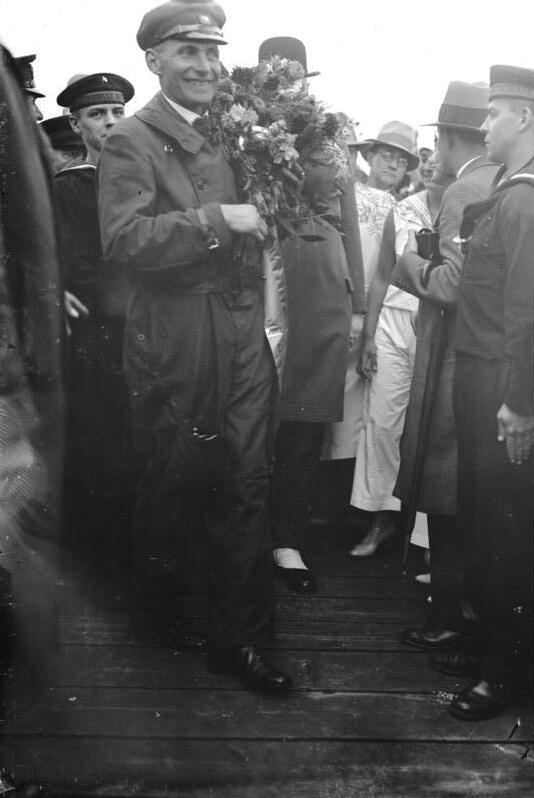
- Wolfgang von Gronau being welcomed back home at Templiner See after his 1930 transatlantic flight
- Born: 25 February 1893; Berlin, Province of Brandenburg, Kingdom of Prussia, German Empire
- Died: 23 October 1977 (aged 84); Frasdorf, West Germany
- Burial place: List auf Sylt
- Military career
- Allegiance: German Empire; Nazi Germany
- Branch: Imperial German Navy; Luftwaffe
- Service years: 1911–1919; 1936–1945
- Rank: (German Empire) Oberleutnant zur See (Nazi Germany) Generalmajor
- Awards: Iron Cross; House Order of Hohenzollern; Order of the Crown of Italy; Order of the Rising Sun; Harmon Trophy

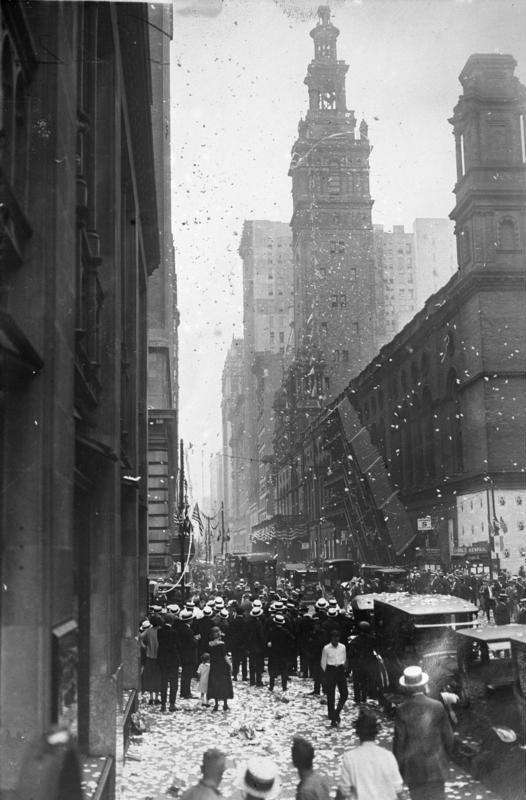
Wolfgang von Gronau being welcomed in New York City in 1930

Hans Wolfgang Gronau, as of 1913 von Gronau (25 February 1893 – 17 March 1977), was a German aviation pioneer and Luftwaffe general. During World War II he was the German air attaché and the chief of the Luftwaffe liaison staff in Japan.

== Biography ==
Wolfgang von Gronau was born in Berlin in a family hailing from the ancient dynasty of the House of Berg. He was the son of artillery General Hans von Gronau (1850–1940) and Luise Gerischer (1867–1926).

On 1 April 1911, he joined the Imperial German Navy as an officer candidate where he was put in charge of a flying boat squadron during World War I. After the disbandment of the imperial military in 1919, von Gronau had reached the rank of Oberleutnant zur See, highest lieutenant grade in the German Navy.

Wolfgang von Gronau was one of the earliest proponents of transatlantic flights via Greenland using great-circle navigation. On 18 August 1930 von Gronau flew on a transatlantic flight on a Dornier Wal —the old D-1422 flying boat that Amundsen had flown earlier. He took off from Sylt (Germany) through Faroe Islands, Iceland, Greenland and Labrador, reaching New York City after covering 7,520 km (4,670 mi) in 47 flight hours.

On 21 July 1932 von Gronau flew from Germany around the world on another Dornier Wal flying boat —named "Grönland Wal" (Greenland Whale)— with a crew of three people. He returned 111 days later, on 10 November, after having taken off from List auf Sylt westwards across Iceland, Greenland, Canada, the Aleutians, Alaska, the Kurils, Japan, China, the Philippines, Indonesia, Malacca, Burma, Ceylon, India, Iran, Iraq, Cyprus, Greece and Italy, landing finally in the Lake of Constance after having covered over 44,000 km (27,000 mi).

In 1934 he became the president of the Aeroclub von Deutschland and in 1935 vice president of the Fédération Aéronautique Internationale. Von Gronau was posted to the German Embassy in Tokyo as air attaché shortly before the outbreak of World War II. He lived as a diplomat in Japan until the end of the war, having reached the rank of Major general when the Third Reich was disbanded.

In 1947 von Gronau moved to Upper Bavaria. He died in Frasdorf in 1977 while he was living in retirement. His remains were buried in List auf Sylt, close to the tomb of his wife.

== Honours ==
Wolfgang von Gronau won the Harmon Trophy in 1931 (national) and 1932. In List auf Sylt stands a stone memorial to his flying boat exploits.

The Gronau Nunataks (69°27′N 30°15′W) and the Gronau Glacier (69°29′N 30°54′W) in northern King Christian IX Land, Greenland, were named after him.

A street in the capital city of the Philippines, Manila was named after him, although misspelled as Von Granao.

== Bibliography ==
- M. Michiel van der Mey: Dornier Wal – „A Light coming over the Sea“.
- Wolfgang von Gronau. Pionierflüge mit dem Dornier-Wal. Luftfahrt-Verlag Walter Zuerl, Steinebach-Wörthsee
