= Starzawa =

- Village
- Location within Poland
- Coordinates: 49°52′38″N 23°0′50″E
- Country: Poland
- Voivodeship: Subcarpathian
- County: Przemyśl
- Gmina: Stubno

Starzawa [staˈʐava] is a village in the administrative district of Gmina Stubno, within Przemyśl County, Subcarpathian Voivodeship, in south-eastern Poland, close to the border with Ukraine.
