= Hruszowice =

- Village
- Location within Poland
- Coordinates: 49°57′N 23°0′E
- Country: Poland
- Voivodeship: Subcarpathian
- County: Przemyśl
- Gmina: Stubno
- Postal code: 37-724
- Vehicle registration: RPR

Hruszowice [xruʂɔˈvit͡sɛ] is a village in Gmina Stubno, within Przemyśl County, Subcarpathian Voivodeship, in southeastern Poland, near the border with Ukraine.

Hruszowice was a private village of the Czacki noble family.

== Notable people ==
- Franciszek Siarczyński (1758–1829), Polish Piarist priest, historian, geographer, writer and publicist.
