= Zagroble, Podkarpackie Voivodeship =

Zagroble
- Village
- Location within Poland
- Coordinates: 49°54′49″N 23°01′52″E
- Country: Poland
- Voivodeship: Subcarpathian
- County: Przemyśl
- Gmina: Stubno

Zagroble [zaˈɡrɔblɛ] is a village in the administrative district of Gmina Stubno, within Przemyśl County, Subcarpathian Voivodeship, in south-eastern Poland, close to the border with Ukraine.
