= Gmina Stubno =

Gmina Stubno Stubno Commune
- Gmina
- Interactive map of Gmina Stubno
- Coordinates (Stubno): 49°54′N 22°58′E
- Country: Poland
- Voivodeship: Subcarpathian
- County: Przemyśl County
- Seat: Stubno

Area
  - Total: 89.12 km^{2} (34.41 sq mi)

Population (2013)
  - Total: 4,020
  - Density: 45.1/km^{2} (117/sq mi)
- Website: http://stubno.pu.pl

Gmina Stubno is a rural gmina (administrative district) in Przemyśl County, Subcarpathian Voivodeship, in south-eastern Poland, on the border with Ukraine. Its seat is the village of Stubno, which lies approximately 20 kilometres (12 mi) north-east of Przemyśl and 71 km (44 mi) east of the regional capital Rzeszów.

The gmina covers an area of 89.12 square kilometres (34.4 sq mi), and as of 2006 its total population is 3,959 (4,020 in 2013).

== Villages ==
Gmina Stubno contains the villages and settlements of Barycz, Chałupki Dusowskie, Gaje, Hruszowice, Kalników, Kolonia Stubno, Kowaliki, Nakło, Pogorzelec, Starzawa, Stubienko, Stubno and Zagroble.

== Neighbouring gminas ==
Gmina Stubno is bordered by the gminas of Medyka, Orły, Radymno and Żurawica. It also borders Ukraine.
