= Hans von Gronau =

Prussian officer and General

- Born: 6 February 1850; Alt Schadow, Province of Brandenburg, Kingdom of Prussia, German Confederation
- Died: 22 February 1940 (aged 90); Potsdam, Province of Brandenburg, German Reich
- Relatives: Wolfgang von Gronau
- Military career
- Allegiance: German Empire
- Branch: Heer
- Service years: 1869–1919
- Rank: General of the Artillery
- Commands: 16th (1st East Prussian) Field Artillery; 2nd Field Artillery Brigade; 1st Infantry Division; IV Reserve Corps; XXXXI Reserve Corps; Armee-Abteilung Gronau
- Conflicts: Franco-German War; World War I
- Awards: Pour le Mérite with oak leaves

Johann Karl Hermann Gronau, from 1913 von Gronau, commonly known as Hans von Gronau (6 February 1850, in Alt Schadow – 22 February 1940, in Potsdam) was a Prussian officer, and General during World War I.

== World War I ==
At the outbreak of World War I, Gronau was recalled from retirement to take command of the newly formed IV Reserve Corps as part of the 1st Army, commanded by General Alexander von Kluck. The army was the right wing of the forces that invaded France and Belgium as part of the Schlieffen Plan offensive in August 1914. His main objective was to cover the vulnerable right flank of the army. On 5 September, when the French 6th Army launched its surprise attack on Ourcq, a tributary of River Marne, they were brought under heavy fire by German guns. As darkness fell, von Gronau knew that he had won the necessary time to save the 1st Army from a surprise attack and retreated. Next day on 6 September, when the French attacked again, they found the German positions to be empty.

In September 1915, Gronau was appointed to command of XXXXI Reserve Corps, swapping places with Generalleutnant Arnold von Winckler. The corps was upgraded to form Armee-Gruppe Gronau on 20 September 1915. Gronau remained in concurrent command of the corps and the Armee-Gruppe. It served as part of the Army of the Bug throughout its existence. On 18 September 1916 the command was upgraded to form the Armee-Abteilung Gronau. It remained on the Eastern Front until dissolved on 27 March 1918.

On 4 October 1916 he was awarded the Pour le Mérite for military bravery. He was awarded the oak leaves, signifying a second award, on 6 August 1918.

== Family ==
On 23 February 1890 Gronau married Luise Gerischer (20 July 1867 – 25 June 1926). The marriage produced three sons. His oldest son was the flight pioneer Wolfgang von Gronau who crossed the Atlantic Ocean from East to West flying a Dornier Wal D-1422 landing in the Hudson River on 26 August 1930.

== Awards ==
- Iron Cross (1870) II class
- Iron Cross (1914) I class
- Pour le Mérite (4 October 1916) and Oak Leaves (6 August 1918)
- Order of the Red Eagle I class with Oak Leaves
- Order of the Crown I class

== Glossary ==
- Armee-Abteilung or Army Detachment in the sense of "something detached from an Army". It is not under the command of an Army so is in itself a small Army.
- Armee-Gruppe or Army Group in the sense of a group within an Army and under its command, generally formed as a temporary measure for a specific task.
- Heeresgruppe or Army Group in the sense of a number of armies under a single commander.

== Bibliography ==
- Cron, Hermann (2002). Imperial German Army 1914-18: Organisation, Structure, Orders-of-Battle [first published: 1937]. Helion & Co. ISBN 1-874622-70-1.
- Hildebrand, Karl-Friedrich; Zweng, Christian (1999). Die Ritter des Ordens Pour le Mérite des I. Weltkriegs, Band 1: A-G. Biblio Verlag, Osnabrück, Germany. ISBN 3-7648-2505-7.

Military offices
Preceded by New Formation	Commander, IV Reserve Corps; 2 August 1914 – 11 September 1915	Succeeded by Generalleutnant Arnold von Winckler
Preceded by Generalleutnant Arnold von Winckler	Commander, XXXXI Reserve Corps; 11 September 1915 - End of World War I	Succeeded by Dissolved
Preceded by New Formation	Commander, Armee-Gruppe Gronau; 20 September 1915 – 18 September 1916	Succeeded by Upgraded to Armee-Abteilung Gronau
Preceded by Upgraded from Armee-Gruppe Gronau	Commander, Armee-Abteilung Gronau; 18 September 1916 - 27 March 1918	Succeeded by Dissolved
