= Pogorzelec, Podkarpackie Voivodeship =

Pogorzelec
- Settlement
- Location within Poland
- Coordinates: 49°54′57″N 23°0′44″E
- Country: Poland
- Voivodeship: Subcarpathian
- County: Przemyśl
- Gmina: Stubno

Pogorzelec [pɔɡɔˈʐɛlɛt͡s] is a settlement in the administrative district of Gmina Stubno, within Przemyśl County, Subcarpathian Voivodeship, in south-eastern Poland, close to the border with Ukraine.
