= Barycz, Przemyśl County =

Barycz
- Village
- Location within Poland
- Coordinates: 49°53′53″N 22°53′59″E
- Country: Poland
- Voivodeship: Subcarpathian
- County: Przemyśl
- Gmina: Stubno

Barycz [ˈbarɨt͡ʂ] is a village in the administrative district of Gmina Stubno, within Przemyśl County, Subcarpathian Voivodeship, in south-eastern Poland, close to the border with Ukraine.
