= Kolonia Stubno =

- Settlement
- Location within Poland
- Coordinates: 49°53′28″N 22°56′37″E
- Country: Poland
- Voivodeship: Subcarpathian
- County: Przemyśl
- Gmina: Stubno

Kolonia Stubno [kɔˈlɔɲa ˈstubnɔ] is a settlement in the administrative district of Gmina Stubno, within Przemyśl County, Subcarpathian Voivodeship, in south-eastern Poland, close to the border with Ukraine.
