= IV Reserve Corps =

IV Reserve Corps IV. Reserve-Korps
- Flag of the Staff of a Generalkommando (1871–1918)
- Active: 2 August 1914 - post November 1918
- Country: German Empire
- Type: Corps
- Size: Approximately 38,000 (on formation)
- Engagements: World War I Battle of the Frontiers

Insignia
- Abbreviation: IV RK

The IV Reserve Corps (German: IV. Reserve-Korps / IV RK) was a corps level command of the German Army in World War I.

== Formation ==
IV Reserve Corps was formed on the outbreak of the war in August 1914 as part of the mobilisation of the Army. It was initially commanded by General der Artillerie Hans von Gronau, who was recalled from retirement. From 24 July 1916 to 19 December 1917, the Corps was known as Karpathenkorps (Carpathian Corps). The Corps was still in existence at the end of the war as part of the 2nd Army, Heeresgruppe Kronprinz Rupprecht on the Western Front.

=== Structure on formation ===
On formation in August 1914, IV Reserve Corps consisted of two divisions, made up of reserve units. In general, Reserve Corps and Reserve Divisions were weaker than their active counterparts

Reserve Infantry Regiments did not always have three battalions nor necessarily contain a machine gun company
Reserve Jäger Battalions did not have a machine gun company on formation
Reserve Cavalry Regiments consisted of just three squadrons
Reserve Field Artillery Regiments usually consisted of two abteilungen of three batteries each
Corps Troops generally consisted of a Telephone Detachment and four sections of munition columns and trains

In summary, IV Reserve Corps mobilised with 25 infantry battalions, 4 machine gun companies (24 machine guns), 6 cavalry squadrons, 12 field artillery batteries (72 guns) and 3 pioneer companies.

22nd Reserve Division was formed by units drawn from the XI Corps District.

Corps	Division	Brigade	Units
IV Reserve Corps	7th Reserve Division	13th Reserve Infantry Brigade	27th Reserve Infantry Regiment
IV Reserve Corps	7th Reserve Division	13th Reserve Infantry Brigade	36th Reserve Infantry Regiment
IV Reserve Corps	7th Reserve Division	14th Reserve Infantry Brigade	66th Reserve Infantry Regiment
IV Reserve Corps	7th Reserve Division	14th Reserve Infantry Brigade	72nd Reserve Infantry Regiment
IV Reserve Corps	7th Reserve Division	14th Reserve Infantry Brigade	4th Reserve Jäger Battalion
IV Reserve Corps	7th Reserve Division		1st Reserve Schwere Reiter Regiment
IV Reserve Corps	7th Reserve Division		7th Reserve Field Artillery Regiment
IV Reserve Corps	7th Reserve Division		4th Company, 4th Pioneer Battalion
IV Reserve Corps	7th Reserve Division		7th Reserve Divisional Pontoon Train
IV Reserve Corps	7th Reserve Division		4th Reserve Medical Company
IV Reserve Corps	22nd Reserve Division	43rd Reserve Infantry Brigade	71st Reserve Infantry Regiment
IV Reserve Corps	22nd Reserve Division	43rd Reserve Infantry Brigade	94th Reserve Infantry Regiment
IV Reserve Corps	22nd Reserve Division	43rd Reserve Infantry Brigade	11th Reserve Jäger Battalion
IV Reserve Corps	22nd Reserve Division	44th Reserve Infantry Brigade	32nd Reserve Infantry Regiment
IV Reserve Corps	22nd Reserve Division	44th Reserve Infantry Brigade	82nd Reserve Infantry Regiment
IV Reserve Corps	22nd Reserve Division		1st Reserve Jäger zu Pferde Regiment
IV Reserve Corps	22nd Reserve Division		22nd Reserve Field Artillery Regiment
IV Reserve Corps	22nd Reserve Division		1st Reserve Company, 4th Pioneer Battalion
IV Reserve Corps	22nd Reserve Division		2nd Reserve Company, 4th Pioneer Battalion
IV Reserve Corps	22nd Reserve Division		2nd Reserve Divisional Pontoon Train
IV Reserve Corps	22nd Reserve Division		11th Reserve Medical Company
IV Reserve Corps	Corps Troops		4th Reserve Telephone Detachment
IV Reserve Corps	Corps Troops		Munition Trains and Columns corresponding to the III Reserve Corps

== Combat chronicle ==
On mobilisation, IV Reserve Corps was assigned to the 1st Army, which was on the right wing of the forces that invaded France and Belgium as part of the Schlieffen Plan offensive in August 1914.

== Commanders ==
IV Reserve Corps had the following commanders during its existence:

From	Rank	Name
2 August 1914	General der Artillerie	Hans von Gronau
11 September 1915	Generalleutnant	Arnold von Winckler
7 August 1916	Generalleutnant	Richard von Conta
18 August 1918	General der Infanterie	Richard von Conta

== See also ==
- German Army order of battle (1914)
- German Army order of battle, Western Front (1918)

== Bibliography ==
- Cron, Hermann (2002). Imperial German Army 1914-18: Organisation, Structure, Orders-of-Battle [first published: 1937]. Helion & Co. ISBN 1-874622-70-1.
- Ellis, John; Cox, Michael (1993). The World War I Databook. Aurum Press Ltd. ISBN 1-85410-766-6.
- Histories of Two Hundred and Fifty-One Divisions of the German Army which Participated in the War (1914-1918), compiled from records of Intelligence section of the General Staff, American Expeditionary Forces, at General Headquarters, Chaumont, France 1919. The London Stamp Exchange Ltd. 1989 [1920]. ISBN 0-948130-87-3.
- The German Forces in the Field; 7th Revision, 11th November 1918; Compiled by the General Staff, War Office. Imperial War Museum, London and the Battery Press. 1995 [1918]. ISBN 978-1-870423-95-3.
