= Ailette =

Knightly armour component

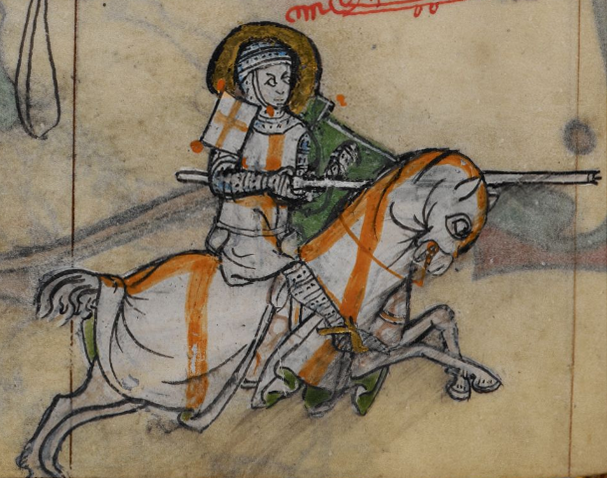
A knight in the first quarter of the 14th century. Over his shoulders, he wears ailettes.

The ailette (French language for little wing) was a component of late thirteenth and early to mid fourteenth century knightly armour. Usually made of cuir bouilli (sometimes of plate or parchment), ailettes were thick, quadrangular pieces of leather or wood that attached to the shoulders by means of silk or leather cord. Ailettes were usually flat and nearly rectangular in shape, and usually decorated with heraldic designs.

Ailettes made brief appearances in the late 13th and early 14th century before giving way to more protective joint plates that covered the joint gap in the shoulders.

38 pairs of ailettes of leather were purchased from a currier for 8 d. for each pair for the Windsor Park Tournament in 1278, implying they were a common piece of equipment at that date in England.

The purpose of ailettes is a matter of disagreement amongst scholars. Some, such as Charles ffoulkes, claim that they enhanced protection to the neck, while others, like Ewart Oakeshott, argue that they were used primarily for decorative and heraldic reasons.

== Bibliography ==
- Samuel Lysons 1814, "Copy of a Roll of Purchases made for the Tournament of Windsor Park...", in Archaeologia, or, Miscellaneous tracts relating to antiquity, vol XVII. Internet Archive
- Charles John Ffoulkes 1912, The Armourer and his Craft: From the 11th to the 16th Century. Internet Archive
- George Cameron Stone 1934, A Glossary of the Construction, Decoration, and Use of Arms and Armor in All Countries and in All Times: Together with Some Closely Related Subjects, p. 6. Google books
- R. Ewart Oakeshott 1960, The Archaeology of weapons: arms and armour from prehistoric to the age of chivalry, p 272. Google books
- David Edge og John Miles Paddock 1988, Arms and Armour of the Medieval Knight. Google books
- Roland Thomas Richardson 2012, The medieval inventories of the Tower armouries 1320–1410. White Rose eTheses Online
