= XXXXI Reserve Corps =

XXXXI ReseCorps XXXxxxxxXI. Reserve-Korps
- Flag of the Staff of a Generalkommando (1871–1918)
- Active: December 1914 - post November 1918
- Country: German Empire
- Type: Corps
- Size: Approximately 26,000 (on formation)
- Engagements: World War I: Eastern Front Gorlice–Tarnów offensive Battle of Lemberg (1915) Western Front Battle of Lys (1918)

The XXXXI Reserve Corps (German: XXXXI. Reserve-Korps / XXXXI RK) was a corps level command of the German Army in World War I.

== Formation ==
XXXXI Reserve Corps was formed in December 1914. It was part of the second wave of new Corps formed in the early stages of World War I consisting of XXXVIII - XXXXI Reserve Corps of 75th - 82nd Reserve Divisions (plus 8th Bavarian Reserve Division). The personnel was predominantly made up of kriegsfreiwillige (wartime volunteers) who did not wait to be called up. It was still in existence at the end of the war.

=== Structure on formation ===
On formation in December 1914, XXXXI Reserve Corps consisted of two divisions. but was weaker than an Active Corps

- the divisions were organised as triangular rather than square divisions with three infantry regiments rather than four, but had a brigade of two field artillery regiments
- Reserve Infantry Regiments consisted of three battalions but lacked a machine gun company
- Reserve Cavalry Detachments were much smaller than the Reserve Cavalry Regiments formed on mobilisation
- Reserve Field Artillery Regiments consisted of two abteilungen (1 gun and 1 howitzer) of three batteries each, but each battery had just 4 guns (rather than 6 of the Active and the Reserve Regiments formed on mobilisation)

In summary, XXXXI Reserve Corps mobilised with 18 infantry battalions, 2 cavalry detachments, 24 field artillery batteries (96 guns), 2 cyclist companies and 2 pioneer companies.

| Corps | Division | Brigade | Units |
|---|---|---|---|
| XXXXI Reserve Corps | 81st Reserve Division | 81st Reserve Infantry Brigade | 267th Reserve Infantry Regiment |
| XXXXI Reserve Corps | 81st Reserve Division | 81st Reserve Infantry Brigade | 268th Reserve Infantry Regiment |
| XXXXI Reserve Corps | 81st Reserve Division | 81st Reserve Infantry Brigade | 269th Reserve Infantry Regiment |
| XXXXI Reserve Corps | 81st Reserve Division | 81st Reserve Field Artillery Brigade | 67th Reserve Field Artillery Regiment |
| XXXXI Reserve Corps | 81st Reserve Division | 81st Reserve Field Artillery Brigade | 68th Reserve Field Artillery Regiment |
| XXXXI Reserve Corps | 81st Reserve Division | | 81st Reserve Cavalry Detachment |
| XXXXI Reserve Corps | 81st Reserve Division | | 81st Reserve Cyclist Company |
| XXXXI Reserve Corps | 81st Reserve Division | | 81st Reserve Pioneer Company |
| XXXXI Reserve Corps | 82nd Reserve Division | 82nd Reserve Infantry Brigade | 270th Reserve Infantry Regiment |
| XXXXI Reserve Corps | 82nd Reserve Division | 82nd Reserve Infantry Brigade | 271st Reserve Infantry Regiment |
| XXXXI Reserve Corps | 82nd Reserve Division | 82nd Reserve Infantry Brigade | 272nd Reserve Infantry Regiment |
| XXXXI Reserve Corps | 82nd Reserve Division | 82nd Reserve Field Artillery Brigade | 69th Reserve Field Artillery Regiment |
| XXXXI Reserve Corps | 82nd Reserve Division | 82nd Reserve Field Artillery Brigade | 70th Reserve Field Artillery Regiment |
| XXXXI Reserve Corps | 82nd Reserve Division | | 82nd Reserve Cavalry Detachment |
| XXXXI Reserve Corps | 82nd Reserve Division | | 82nd Reserve Cyclist Company |
| XXXXI Reserve Corps | 82nd Reserve Division | | 82nd Reserve Pioneer Company |

On 2 May 1915 in preparation for the Gorlice-Tarnow Offensive the corps consisted of 18 battalions, 4 squadrons, 43 machine guns and 108 guns. The corps was organized as follows:

| Corps | Division | Brigade | Units |
|---|---|---|---|
| XXXXI Reserve Corps | 81st Reserve Division | 81st Reserve Infantry Brigade | 267th Reserve Infantry Regiment |
| XXXXI Reserve Corps | 81st Reserve Division | 81st Reserve Infantry Brigade | 268th Reserve Infantry Regiment |
| XXXXI Reserve Corps | 81st Reserve Division | 81st Reserve Infantry Brigade | 269th Reserve Infantry Regiment |
| XXXXI Reserve Corps | 81st Reserve Division | 81st Reserve Field Artillery Brigade | 67th Reserve Field Artillery Regiment (3 cannon & 3 light field howitzer batteries) |
| XXXXI Reserve Corps | 81st Reserve Division | 81st Reserve Field Artillery Brigade | 68th Reserve Field Artillery Regiment (3 cannon & 3 light field howitzer batteries) |
| XXXXI Reserve Corps | 81st Reserve Division | | 81st Reserve Cavalry Detachment |
| XXXXI Reserve Corps | 81st Reserve Division | | 4th Squadron, 7th Dragoon Regiment |
| XXXXI Reserve Corps | 81st Reserve Division | | 84th & 85th Reserve Pioneer Companies |
| XXXXI Reserve Corps | 82nd Reserve Division | 82nd Reserve Infantry Brigade | 270th Reserve Infantry Regiment |
| XXXXI Reserve Corps | 82nd Reserve Division | 82nd Reserve Infantry Brigade | 271st Reserve Infantry Regiment |
| XXXXI Reserve Corps | 82nd Reserve Division | 82nd Reserve Infantry Brigade | 272nd Reserve Infantry Regiment |
| XXXXI Reserve Corps | 82nd Reserve Division | 82nd Reserve Field Artillery Brigade | 69th Reserve Field Artillery Regiment (3 cannon & 3 light field howitzer batteries) |
| XXXXI Reserve Corps | 82nd Reserve Division | 82nd Reserve Field Artillery Brigade | 70th Reserve Field Artillery Regiment (3 cannon & 3 light field howitzer batteries) |
| XXXXI Reserve Corps | 82nd Reserve Division | | 82nd Reserve Cavalry Detachment |
| XXXXI Reserve Corps | 82nd Reserve Division | | 4th Squadron, 7th Uhlan Regiment |
| XXXXI Reserve Corps | 82nd Reserve Division | | 82nd Reserve Pioneer Company & 1st Company, 18th Pioneer Regiment |
| XXXXI Reserve Corps | 82nd Reserve Division | | 2nd Battalion, 3rd Foot Artillery Regiment (3 batteries heavy field howitzers) |
| XXXXI Reserve Corps | Attached | 1 - 15-cm Austro-Hungarian howitzer battery (4 guns) | |
| XXXXI Reserve Corps | Attached | 1 - 12-cm Austro-Hungarian cannon battery (4 guns) | |
| XXXXI Reserve Corps | Attached | 7th Battery, Bavarian 1st Reserve Foot Artillery (4 – 10-cm cannons) | |
| XXXXI Reserve Corps | Attached | 3rd Battalion, 1st Foot Artillery Regiment (2 btrys, 4 – 21-cm mortars each) | |
| XXXXI Reserve Corps | Attached | 229th Light Trench Mortar Detachment (6 mortars) | |
| XXXXI Reserve Corps | Attached | 230th Light Trench Mortar Detachment (6 mortars) | |
| XXXXI Reserve Corps | Attached | 120th Medium Trench Mortar Detachment (4 mortars) | |
| XXXXI Reserve Corps | Attached | 35th Heavy Trench Mortar Detachment (2 mortars) | |

== Commanders ==
XXXXI Reserve Corps had the following commanders during its existence:

| From | Rank | Name |
|---|---|---|
| 24 December 1914 | General der Infanterie | Hermann von François |
| 29 June 1915 | Generalleutnant | Arnold von Winckler |
| 11 September 1915 | General der Artillerie | Hans von Gronau |

== Bibliography ==
- Cron, Hermann (2002). Imperial German Army 1914-18: Organisation, Structure, Orders-of-Battle [first published: 1937]. Helion & Co. ISBN 1-874622-70-1.
- Ellis, John; Cox, Michael (1993). The World War I Databook. Aurum Press Ltd. ISBN 1-85410-766-6.
- Busche, Hartwig (1998). Formationsgeschichte der Deutschen Infanterie im Ersten Weltkrieg (1914 bis 1918) (in German). Institut für Preußische Historiographie.
- Histories of Two Hundred and Fifty-One Divisions of the German Army which Participated in the War (1914-1918), compiled from records of Intelligence section of the General Staff, American Expeditionary Forces, at General Headquarters, Chaumont, France 1919. The London Stamp Exchange Ltd. 1989 [1920]. ISBN 0-948130-87-3.
- The German Forces in the Field; 7th Revision, 11th November 1918; Compiled by the General Staff, War Office. Imperial War Museum, London and the Battery Press. 1995 [1918]. ISBN 978-1-870423-95-3.
