= 54th Corps (German Empire) =

54th Corps (Generalkommando zbV 54)
- Flag of the Staff of a Generalkommando (1871–1918)
- Active: September 1916-1919
- Disbanded: 1919
- Country: German Empire
- Branch: Army
- Engagements: World War I Battle of Amiens (1918)

Insignia
- Abbreviation: Genkdo zbV 54

The 54th Corps (German: Generalkommando zbV 54) was a corps formation of the German Army in World War I. It was formed in September 1916 and was still in existence at the end of the war.

== Chronicle ==
The 54th Corps (z.b.V.) was formed in September 1916. With the onset of trench warfare, the German Army recognised that it was no longer possible to maintain the traditional Corps unit, that is, one made up of two divisions. Whereas at some times (and in some places) a Corps of two divisions was sufficient, at other times 5 or 6 divisions were necessary. Therefore, under the Hindenburg regime (from summer 1916), new Corps headquarters were created without organic divisions. These new Corps were designated General Commands for Special Use (German: Generalkommandos zur besonderen Verwendung).

By the end of the war, the Corps was serving on the Western Front as part of 2nd Army, Heeresgruppe Kronprinz Rupprecht with the following composition:

- 21st Reserve Division
- 22nd Division
- 4th Division
- 113th Division
- 239th Division
- 12th Reserve Division
- Jäger Division
- 185th Division

== Commanders ==
The 54th Corps had the following commanders during its existence:

Commander	From	To
Generalleutnant Viktor Kühne	4 September 1916	2 February 1917
Generalleutnant Richard von Kraewel	2 February 1917	25 February 1917
General der Infanterie Eduard von Liebert	25 February 1917	17 June 1917
Generalleutnant Max von Müller	17 June 1917	21 January 1918
Generalleutnant Alfred von Larisch	21 January 1918	11 November 1918

== Glossary ==
- Armee-Abteilung or Army Detachment in the sense of "something detached from an Army". It is not under the command of an Army so is in itself a small Army.
- Armee-Gruppe or Army Group in the sense of a group within an Army and under its command, generally formed as a temporary measure for a specific task.
- Heeresgruppe or Army Group in the sense of a number of armies under a single commander.

== See also ==
- German Army (German Empire)
- German Army order of battle, Western Front (1918)

== Bibliography ==
- Cron, Hermann (2002). Imperial German Army 1914-18: Organisation, Structure, Orders-of-Battle [first published: 1937]. Helion & Co. ISBN 1-874622-70-1.
- Ellis, John; Cox, Michael (1993). The World War I Databook. Aurum Press Ltd. ISBN 1-85410-766-6.
