= Nakło, Podkarpackie Voivodeship =

Nakło
- Village
- Location within Poland
- Coordinates: 49°52′43″N 22°57′37″E
- Country: Poland
- Voivodeship: Subcarpathian
- County: Przemyśl
- Gmina: Stubno

Nakło [ˈnakwɔ] is a village in the administrative district of Gmina Stubno, within Przemyśl County, Subcarpathian Voivodeship, in south-eastern Poland, close to the border with Ukraine.
