= Jagdstaffel 78 =

Jasta 78
- Active: 1917–1918
- Country: Kingdom of Bavaria, German Empire
- Branch: Luftstreitkräfte
- Type: Fighter squadron
- Engagements: World War I

Royal Bavarian Jagdstaffel 78, commonly abbreviated to Jasta 78, was a "hunting group" (i.e., fighter squadron) of the Luftstreitkräfte, the air arm of the Imperial German Army during World War I. The squadron would score over eight aerial victories during the war, including one observation balloon downed. The unit's victories came at the expense of two killed in action, one killed in flying accidents, and three wounded in action.

== History ==
Jasta 78 was founded at Fliegerersatz-Abteilung ("Replacement Detachment") 1, Schleissheim, on 15 December 1917. Two days later, the new squadron was posted to Armee-Abteilung C. On 28 January 1918, it was transferred to Armee-Abteilung A. Jasta 79 scored its first accredited aerial victory on 12 July 1918. The squadron served through war's end.

== Commanding officers (Staffelführer) ==
- Robert Dycke: 15 December 1917 – 30 July 1918 (WIA)
- Reinhold Benz: 30 July 1918 – 13 August 1918 (KIA)
- Gerhard Ungewitter (acting)
- Hans Jungwirth
- Ludwig Schmid: 9 October 1918

== Duty stations ==
- Burscheid, Germany: 28 January 1918
- Buhl, France
