= 82nd Reserve Division =

82nd Reserve Division (82. Reserve-Division)
- Active: 1914-1919
- Country: Germany
- Branch: Army
- Type: Infantry
- Size: Approx. 12,500
- Engagements: World War I: Gorlice-Tarnów Offensive, Battle of Lemberg (1915)

The 82nd Reserve Division (82. Reserve-Division) was a unit of the Imperial German Army in World War I. The division was formed at the end of December 1914 and organized over the next month, arriving in the line in early February 1915. It was part of the second large wave of new divisions formed at the outset of World War I, which were numbered the 75th through 82nd Reserve Divisions. The division was initially part of XXXXI Reserve Corps. The division was disbanded in 1919 during the demobilization of the German Army after World War I. The division was recruited in various Prussian provinces, primarily Brandenburg and Silesia.

== Combat chronicle ==
The 82nd Reserve Division initially fought on the Western Front, seeing its first action in the trenches west of the Somme. It was transferred to the Eastern Front in April 1915, and fought in the Gorlice-Tarnów Offensive, crossing the San River and fighting around Przemyśl, and then fighting in the 1915 Battle of Lemberg. It continued fighting across the border between Austro-Hungarian Galicia and Russian Poland, fighting in a series of battles leading to the taking of Brest-Litovsk in August and Pinsk in September, and then settled into positional warfare in the Pripyat Marshes. It remained there until December 1917, when after the armistice on the Eastern Front, it was sent back to the Western Front. It fought in the trenches and against various Allied attacks until the end of the war. Allied intelligence rated the division as third class.

== Order of battle on formation ==
The 82nd Reserve Division, like the other divisions of its wave and unlike earlier German divisions, was organized from the outset as a triangular division. The order of battle of the division on December 29, 1914, was as follows:

- 82.Reserve-Infanterie-Brigade
  - Reserve-Infanterie-Regiment Nr. 270
  - Reserve-Infanterie-Regiment Nr. 271
  - Reserve-Infanterie-Regiment Nr. 272
  - Reserve-Radfahrer-Kompanie Nr. 82
- Reserve-Kavallerie-Abteilung Nr. 82
- 82.Reserve-Feldartillerie-Brigade
  - Reserve-Feldartillerie-Regiment Nr. 69
  - Reserve-Feldartillerie-Regiment Nr. 70
- Reserve-Pionier-Kompanie Nr. 86

== Order of battle on January 1, 1918 ==
The most significant wartime structural change in the divisions of this wave was the reduction from two field artillery regiments to one. Over the course of the war, other changes took place, including the formation of artillery and signals commands and the enlargement of combat engineer support to a full pioneer battalion. The order of battle on January 1, 1918, was as follows:

- 82.Reserve-Infanterie-Brigade
  - Reserve-Infanterie-Regiment Nr. 270
  - Reserve-Infanterie-Regiment Nr. 271
  - Reserve-Infanterie-Regiment Nr. 272
- 3.Eskadron/Garde-Dragoner-Regiment Königin Viktoria von Groß Britannien u. Irland Nr. 1
- Artillerie-Kommandeur 82:
  - Reserve-Feldartillerie-Regiment Nr. 70
  - I.Bataillon/Fußartillerie-Regiment Nr. 18 (from May 1, 1918)
- Pionier-Bataillon Nr. 382
  - Reserve-Pionier-Kompanie Nr. 86
  - Pionier-Kompanie Nr. 348
  - Minenwerfer-Kompanie Nr. 282
- Divisions-Nachrichten-Kommandeur 482
