= 49th Infantry Division (Russian Empire) =

- 49-я пехотная дивизия
- Active: 1914–1918
- Country: Russian Empire
- Branch: Russian Imperial Army
- Role: Infantry

The 49th Infantry Division (Russian: 49-я пехотная дивизия, 49-ya Pekhotnaya Diviziya) was an infantry formation of the Russian Imperial Army.

== Organization ==
- 1st Brigade
  - 193rd Infantry Regiment
  - 194th Infantry Regiment
- 2nd Brigade
  - 195th Infantry Regiment
  - 196th Infantry Regiment
- 49th Artillery Brigade
