= Stubno =

- Village
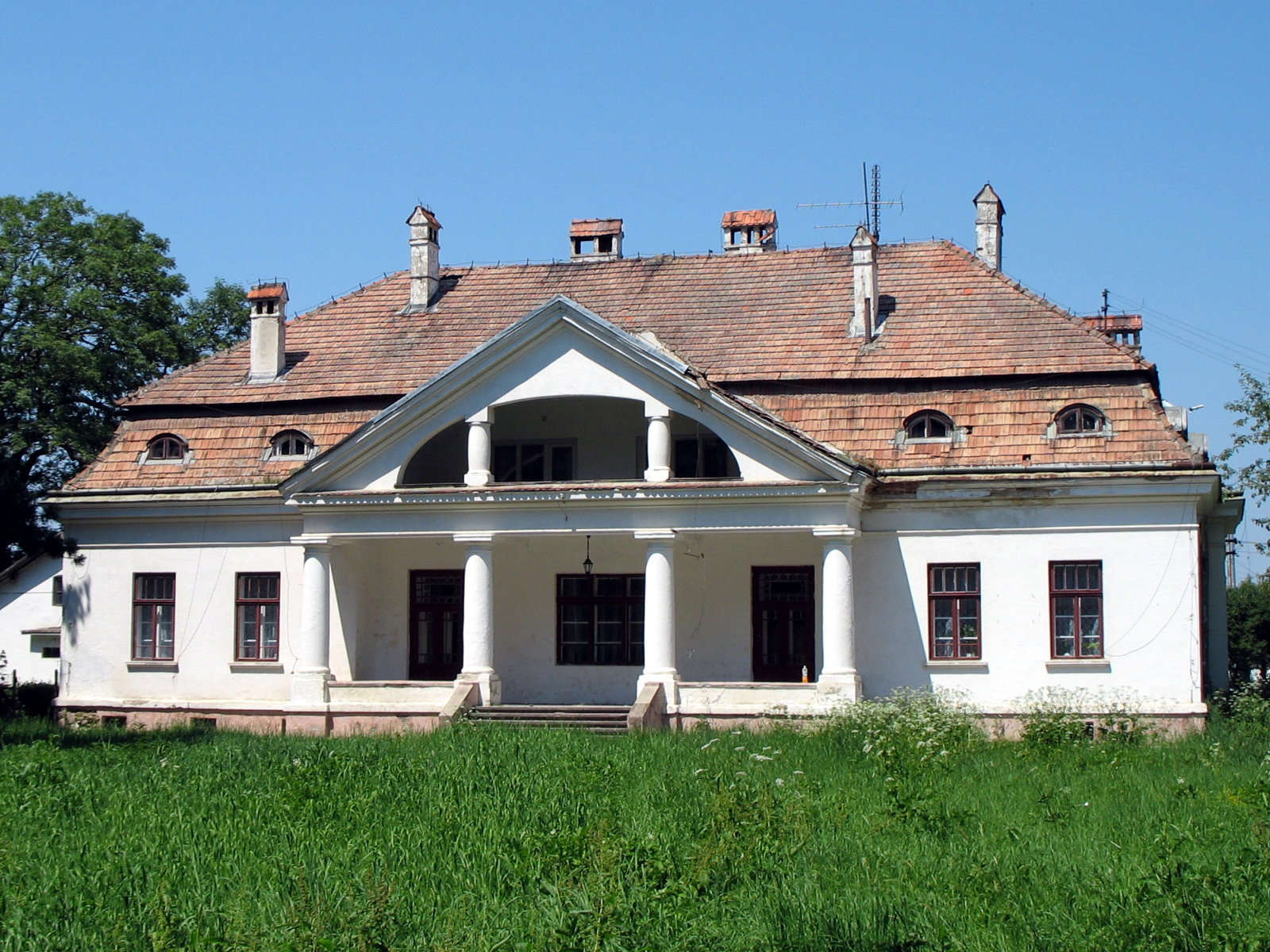
- Old manor house in Stubno

- Location within Poland
- Coordinates: 49°54′N 22°58′E
- Country: Poland
- Voivodeship: Subcarpathian
- County: Przemyśl
- Gmina: Stubno

Population
  - Total: 1,400
- Time zone: UTC+1 (CET)
  - Summer (DST): UTC+2 (CEST)
- Vehicle registration: RPR
- Website: https://www.stubno.pl/

Stubno [ˈstubnɔ] is a village in Przemyśl County, Subcarpathian Voivodeship, in south-eastern Poland, close to the border with Ukraine. It is the seat of the gmina (administrative district) called Gmina Stubno.
