= 48th Infantry Division (Russian Empire) =

- 48-я пехотная дивизия
- Active: 1914–1918
- Country: Russian Empire
- Branch: Russian Imperial Army
- Role: Infantry

The 48th Infantry Division (Russian: 48-я пехотная дивизия, 48-ya Pekhotnaya Diviziya) was an infantry formation of the Russian Imperial Army.

== Organization ==
- 1st Brigade
  - 189th Infantry Regiment
  - 190th Infantry Regiment
- 2nd Brigade
  - 191st Infantry Regiment
  - 192nd Infantry Regiment
- 48th Artillery Brigade
