= Armeeabteilung A (Deutsches Kaiserreich) =

Armee-Abteilung Falkenhausen Armee-Abteilung A Army Detachment A
- Flag of the Staff of an Armee Oberkommando (1871–1918)
- Active: 17 September 1914 – post 11 November 1918
- Country: German Empire
- Type: Army
- Engagements: World War I

Armee-Abteilung Falkenhausen / Armee-Abteilung A (Army Detachment A) was an army level command of the German Army in World War I. It served on the left (southern) wing of the Western Front throughout its existence.

== History ==
Armee-Abteilung Falkenhausen was set up in the southern part of the Western Front in Alsace-Lorraine on 17 September 1914 from the parts of 6th Army that remained in Lorraine after it marched north to participate in the Race to the Sea. The Staff of the dissolved Ersatz Corps under General der Infanterie Ludwig von Falkenhausen took command. It was established as Armee-Abteilung A on 15 April 1916. It was still in existence when the war ended, serving on the Western Front as part of Heeresgruppe Herzog Albrecht von Württemberg.

=== Order of Battle on formation ===
The following Orders of Battle illustrate the progression of the Armee-Abteilung during the war.

Organization of Armee-Abteilung Falkenhausen on 10 December 1914
Army	Corps	Division
Armee-Abteilung Falkenhausen	Former Ersatz Corps	10th Ersatz Division
Armee-Abteilung Falkenhausen	Former Ersatz Corps	Guards Ersatz Division
Armee-Abteilung Falkenhausen	Former Ersatz Corps	8th Ersatz Division
Armee-Abteilung Falkenhausen	Former Ersatz Corps	61st Reserve Infantry Brigade
Armee-Abteilung Falkenhausen	Former Ersatz Corps	1st Bavarian Landwehr Division
Armee-Abteilung Falkenhausen	Former Ersatz Corps	19th Ersatz Division
Armee-Abteilung Falkenhausen	XV Reserve Corps	30th Reserve Division
Armee-Abteilung Falkenhausen	XV Reserve Corps	39th Reserve Division
Armee-Abteilung Falkenhausen	Under Army command	2 Landwehr Brigades

=== Order of Battle, 30 October 1918 ===
By the end of the war, the majority of the units assigned were lower quality Reserve and Landwehr Divisions indicative of the relatively quiet sector that the Armee-Abteilung was operating in.

Organization of Armee-Abteilung A on 30 October 1918
Army	Corps	Division
Armee-Abteilung A	59th Corps (z.b.V.)	96th Division
Armee-Abteilung A	59th Corps (z.b.V.)	21st Landwehr Division
Armee-Abteilung A	59th Corps (z.b.V.)	75th Reserve Division
Armee-Abteilung A	VII Corps	82nd Composite Reserve Infantry Brigade
Armee-Abteilung A	VII Corps	301st Division
Armee-Abteilung A	XV Bavarian Reserve Corps	39th Bavarian Reserve Division
Armee-Abteilung A	XV Bavarian Reserve Corps	61st Landwehr Brigade
Armee-Abteilung A	IX Corps (Austria-Hungary)	37th Division (Austria-Hungary)
Armee-Abteilung A	IX Corps (Austria-Hungary)	4th Landwehr Division

== Commanders ==
Armee-Abteilung A had the following commanders during its existence:

Armee-Abteilung Falkenhausen / Armee-Abteilung A
From	Commander	Previously	Subsequently
17 September 1914	General der Infanterie Ludwig von Falkenhausen	Ersatz Corps	High Command of Coastal Defence
24 December 1914	Generaloberst Ludwig von Falkenhausen	Ersatz Corps	High Command of Coastal Defence
17 April 1916	General der Infanterie Karl Ludwig d'Elsa	XII Corps	Retired status
4 January 1917	General der Infanterie Bruno von Mudra	8th Army	1st Army
9 June 1918	vacant		
6 August 1918	General der Infanterie Johannes von Eben	9th Army	1 Armeekorps from 20 December 1918

== Glossary ==
- Armee-Abteilung or Army Detachment in the sense of "something detached from an Army". It is not under the command of an Army so is in itself a small Army.
- Armee-Gruppe or Army Group in the sense of a group within an Army and under its command, generally formed as a temporary measure for a specific task.
- Heeresgruppe or Army Group in the sense of a number of armies under a single commander.

== See also ==
- Ersatz Corps
- German Army order of battle, Western Front (1918)

== Bibliography ==
- Cron, Hermann (2002). Imperial German Army 1914–18: Organisation, Structure, Orders-of-Battle [first published: 1937]. Helion & Co. ISBN 1-874622-70-1.
- Ellis, John; Cox, Michael (1993). The World War I Databook. Aurum Press Ltd. ISBN 1-85410-766-6.
