= Bavarian Army =

Army of the Electorate and Kingdom of Bavaria

- Bayerische Armee
- Flag of a Royal Bavarian Army Infantry Regiment bearing King Ludwig's royal monogram
- Active: 1682–1919
- Country: Electorate of Bavaria; Kingdom of Bavaria
- Allegiance: King of Bavaria
- Branch: Army
- Size: 30,000 (1812); 87,000 (1914)
- Garrison/HQ: Munich
- Engagements: Great Turkish War; War of the Spanish Succession; War of the Austrian Succession; Seven Years' War; War of the Bavarian Succession; Napoleonic Wars; Austro-Prussian War; Franco-Prussian War; World War I

Commanders
- Notable commanders: Maximilian II; Karl von Wrede; Jakob von Hartmann; Ludwig von der Tann; Oskar von Xylander

The Bavarian Army (German: Bayerische Armee) was the army of the Electorate (1682–1806) and then Kingdom (1806–1918) of Bavaria. It existed from 1682 as the standing army of Bavaria until the merger of the military sovereignty (Wehrhoheit) of Bavaria into that of the German State in 1919. The Bavarian Army was never comparable to the armies of the Great Powers of the 19th century, but it did provide the Wittelsbach dynasty with sufficient scope of action, in the context of effective alliance politics, to transform Bavaria from a territorially-disjointed small state to the second-largest state of the German Empire after Prussia.

== History ==
=== 1682–1790: From the first standing army to the Napoleonic Wars ===
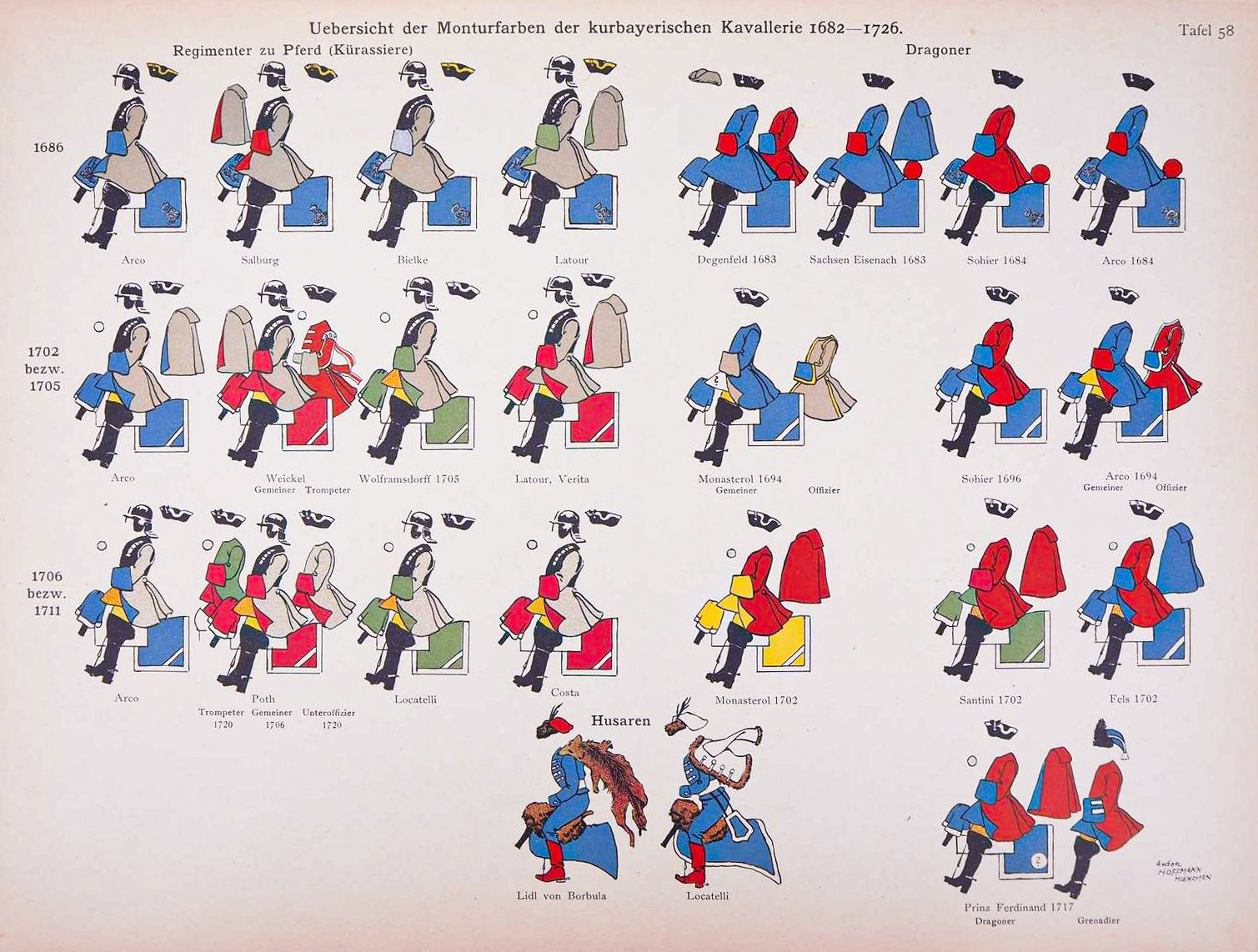
Uniforms of Bavarian cavalry regiments from 1682–1726

The Reichskriegsverfassung of 1681 obliged Bavaria to provide troops for the Imperial army. Moreover, the establishment of a standing army was increasingly seen as a sign of nation-statehood. At a field camp in Schwabing on 12 October 1682, the newly recruited troops, under the command of Hannibal von Degenfeld, were officially taken into Bavarian service. Seven regiments of infantry, two regiments of dragoons and two of cuirassiers were set up, along with an artillery corps. The traditional mid-blue colour was already in wide use among the Bavarian infantry and would be used throughout from 1684. The cuirassiers and artillery wore light grey tunics, while the dragoons wore red or blue tunics. The army distinguished itself under Maximilian II Emanuel, Elector of Bavaria during the Great Turkish War, particularly during the Siege of Belgrade.

During the War of the Spanish Succession, Bavaria fought on the side of France. Following defeat at the Battle of Blenheim, the Bavarian Army ceased to exist as a coherent fighting force, though small remainders continued to fight until the end of the war. Bavaria was occupied by Austrian forces during the war, which led to a rising of the people, bloodily put down at the so-called "Murderous Christmas of Sendling" (Sendlinger Mordweihnacht). By 1701, the composition of the army was the same as that during the Turkish wars, only now with three regiments each of cuirassiers and dragoons.

The attempt by the Elector Charles Albert to gain the Imperial crown during the War of the Austrian Succession was initially successful, but the campaign ended once again with an Austrian occupation of Bavaria.

At the beginning of the Seven Years' War, the army consisted of eight infantry, two dragoon and three cuirassier regiments, and a brigade of artillery. In 1757, one of the cuirassier regiments was disbanded and its men distributed among the other regiments, while only one company of dragoons in each regiment was mounted. Infantry regiments consisted of two battalions with four Füsilierkompanien (each of 130 men) and one infantry company (100 men) as well as two four-Pounder battalion guns. The nominal strength of approximately 1,800 men for each regiment was never reached in the field. While the Lifeguard regiment had three battalions, only two stood in the field. Ten battalions of infantry were made available to the Habsburgs according to Bavaria's Imperial military obligations. They fought unsuccessfully at Schweidnitz, Breslau and Leuthen in 1757, as well as at Troppau, Olmütz and Neiße in 1758.

The unification between the Wittelsbachs and the Palatinate line added eight regiments to the infantry in 1777, and the Palatine troops brought with them a lighter blue tunic colour. The War of the Bavarian Succession is often known as the "Potato War" due to the amount of time and effort the sides expended in securing food supplies and denying them to the enemy, and the war actually passed relatively uneventfully for the Bavarian army.

In 1785, the infantry's uniform changed to white, and the cuirassiers abandoned their traditional armour.

=== 1790–1871: The Napoleonic Wars until the German Empire ===
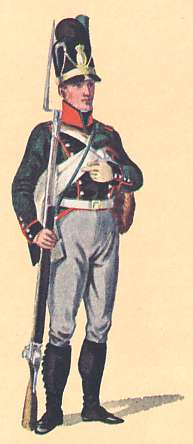
Illustration of schütze of the 2nd Light Infantry Battalion Dietfurth in 1806

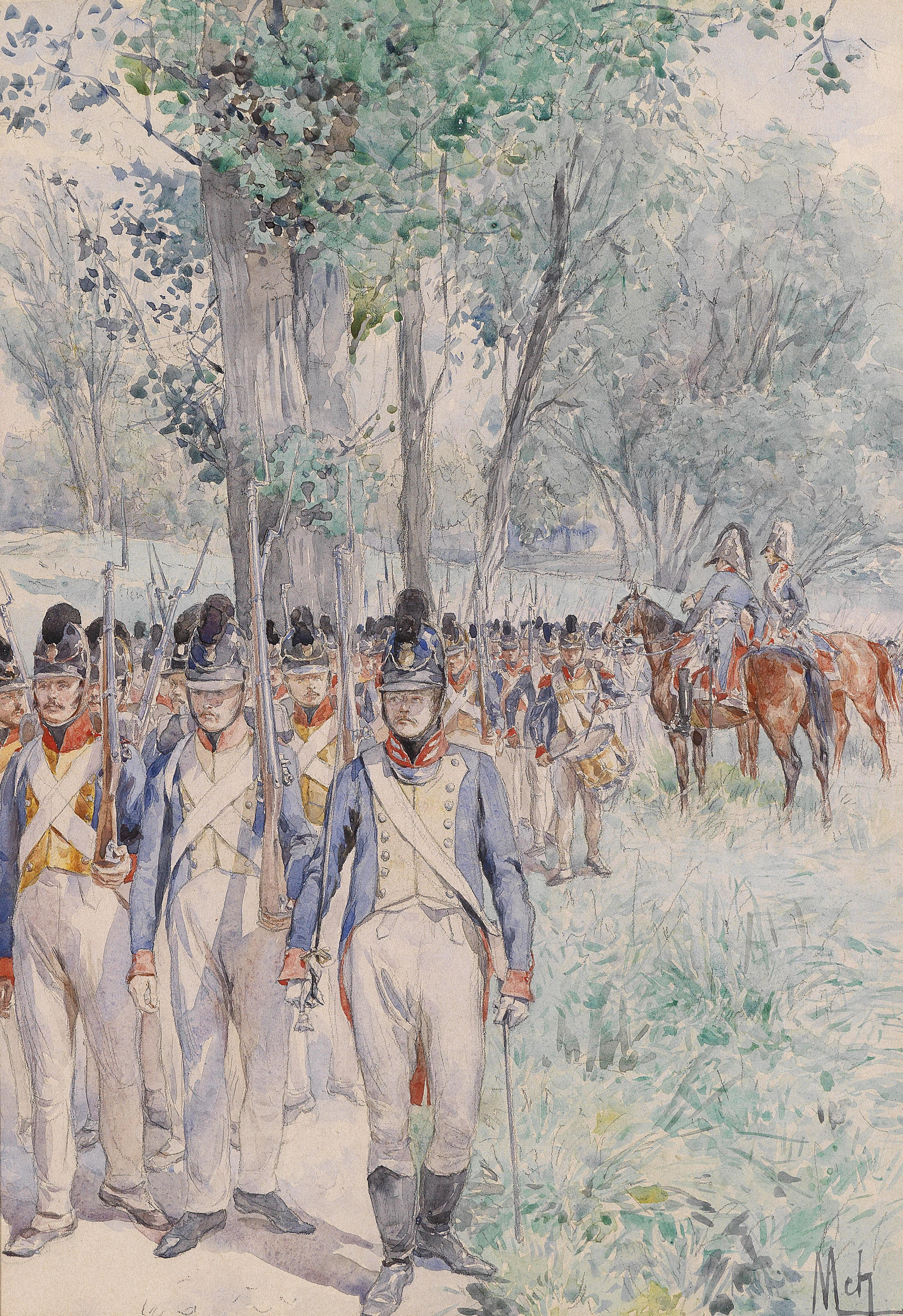
Painting of the 4th Infantry Regiment in 1809

1790 brought a fundamental reform of the Bavarian Army. All field troops received an identically-cut uniform, including a leather helmet with a horsehair plume, known as the "Rumford Casket" after the then Minister for War Count Rumford. However, Maximilian IV found the army in abject condition on his accession to the throne in 1799: hardly any of the units were at full strength, the Rumford uniforms were unpopular and impractical, and the troops were badly-trained. The young prince-elector, who had served under the Ancien Régime in France as a colonel in the Royal Deux-Ponts Regiment, made the reconstruction of the army a priority.

The line infantry was reduced to ten regiments, which were made up to their full strength. The two Jäger regiments were divided into four light infantry battalions. The cavalry consisted of three regiments of light cavalry and two each of dragoons and cuirassiers. The infantry returned to their traditional light blue and, in 1801, all branches of service introduced the Raupenhelm, a helmet with a fore-and-aft horsehair plume, which became characteristic of the Bavarian Army. Capable generals, such as Bernhard Erasmus von Deroy, Karl Philipp von Wrede and Johann Nepomuk von Triva, reformed the army along French lines, and it soon became the most modern in Germany, and the first in Germany to abolish flogging. The field army was based largely on compulsory military service. A national guard with three classes was also developed (1st class: Reserve battalions of the Line regiments; 2nd class: Territorial army; 3rd class: Citizen levy).

In 1800, Bavaria reluctantly fought on Austria's side against France in the War of the Second Coalition, but in 1805 when Austria attacked Bavaria for the third time in 100 years in the War of the Third Coalition, they found a powerful army. The Bavarians initially retreated, but only in order to link up with Napoleon's advancing army and to prepare the counter-attack, which took place quickly, methodically and thoroughly. 30,000 Bavarian troops took part in the successful Siege of Ulm and the consequent liberation of Bavaria. At the Battle of Austerlitz, the Bavarians secured the flanks and supply lines of Napoleon's army and in 1806-7 they forced several Prussian forts to surrender.

Bavaria was awarded the Austrian province of Tyrol as a reward, but unrest erupted into a full-blown rebellion under Andreas Hofer in 1809, which could only be put down with French assistance. When Austria attacked Bavaria once more that same year in the War of the Fifth Coalition, Napoleon's army was concentrated in Spain, and it was troops of the Confederation of the Rhine, predominantly Bavarian, which led the early campaigning against Austria. At the Battle of Wagram, the contribution of Bavarian forces was decisive to the outcome.

In the Russian Campaign, the Bavarian army suffered terrible losses - of about 33,000 men (including following reinforcements) who marched in 1812, only 4,000 returned. Pressed by the Crown Prince and General Wrede, King Maximillian I Joseph turned with a heavy heart away from the French and changed to the Allied camp shortly before the Battle of Leipzig. The attempt by Wrede to stop the victory of the Grande Armée in 1813 at the Battle of Hanau ended in a narrow defeat for his Austro-Bavarian corps. The campaign of 1814 began badly for the Allies, but Wrede made up for his earlier defeat with valuable victories over his former allies at the battles of Arcis-sur-Aube and Bar-sur-Aube.

In 1814, the Bavarian Army consisted of a Grenadier Guard regiment, 16 regiments of Line Infantry, two battalions of Jäger, seven regiments of light cavalry (of which one was territorial), one regiment of Uhlans, two Hussar regiments, one regiment of Garde du Corps (mounted royal bodyguard), two regiments of foot artillery and one of horse-artillery.

In 1815, the 7th (National) Light Cavalry regiment was formed into two Cuirassier regiments. The Hussars and Uhlans were disbanded in 1822. Following the recommendations of the Military Savings Commission in 1826, one infantry regiment was converted into two Jäger battalions, and the Grenadier Guard regiment into an Infantry lifeguard regiment. The Garde du Corps became the 1st Cuirassier Regiment, and the former 1st Cuirassier Regiment was merged into the 2nd Regiment.

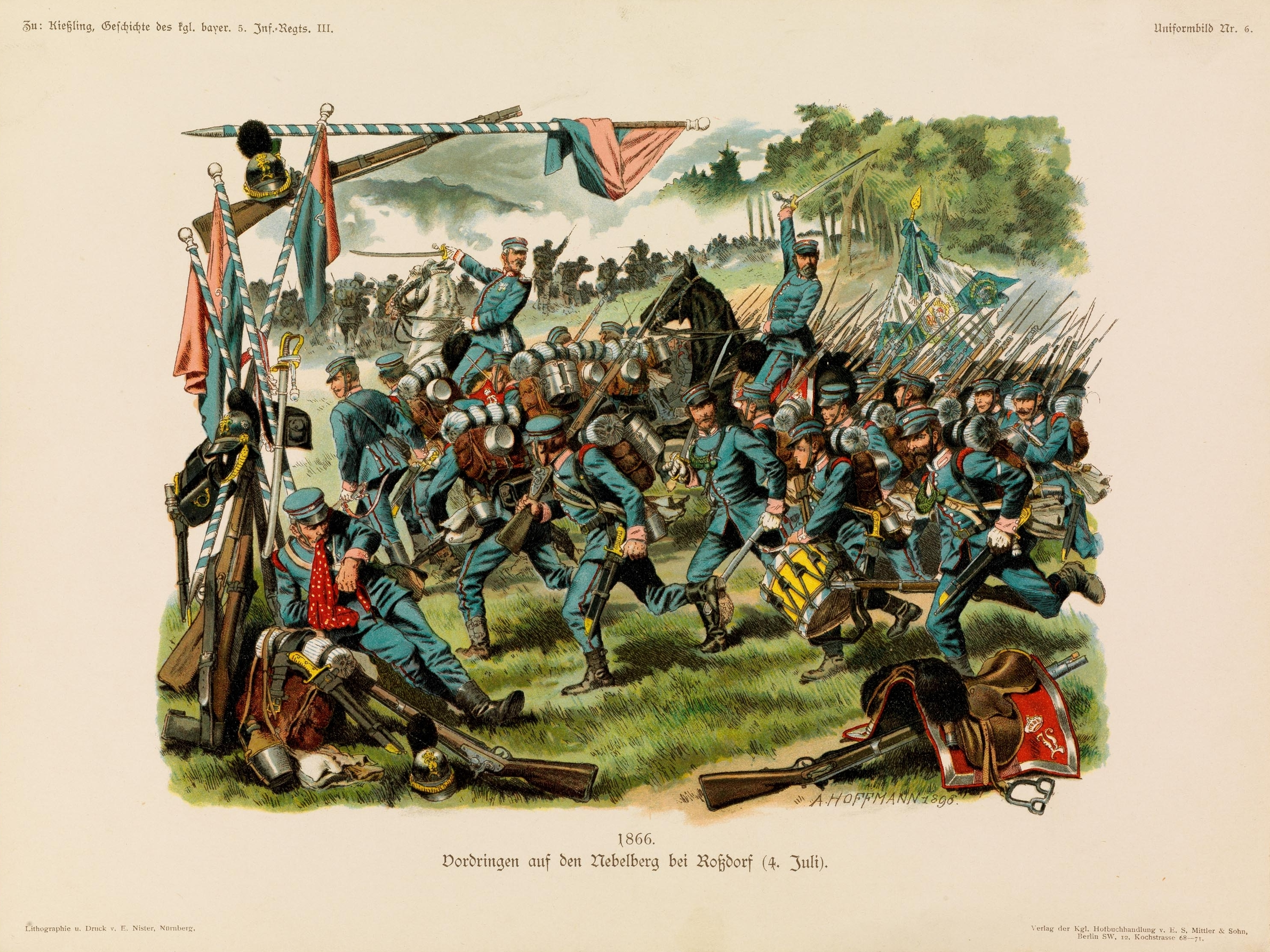
Bavarian Army uniforms and equipment in 1866

The mobilisation of the army for the Austro-Prussian War of 1866 was only concluded on 22 June, by which time the Prussian Army was almost in Bohemia. The war went very badly for the Bavarians. The Bavarian Commander-in-Chief Prince Karl, who also commanded the southern forces of the German Confederation, was hurrying to the aid of the Kingdom of Hanover when he heard of the Hanoverians' surrender after the Battle of Langensalza. The rapid Prussian advance meant that Karl was unable to link up with the western forces of the Confederation under Prince Alexander of Hesse, so the Bavarian troops withdrew to Bad Kissingen. After fierce fighting, the Bavarians withdrew to Schweinfurt and Würzburg (of which only the fortress and part of the city could be held). On 1 August, a Prussian reserve corps occupied Nuremberg.

The difficulties of the Bavarian Army were attributed mainly to the Landtag of Bavaria (parliament), and to the military leadership. Thanks to constant cuts in the military budget, the Bavarian war ministry did not see itself in a position to accomplish manoeuvres above the brigade level. Apart from Prince Karl, and General von Thurn und Taxis, no Bavarian general had ever commanded a division before. The newspapers also criticised the role of von der Tann.

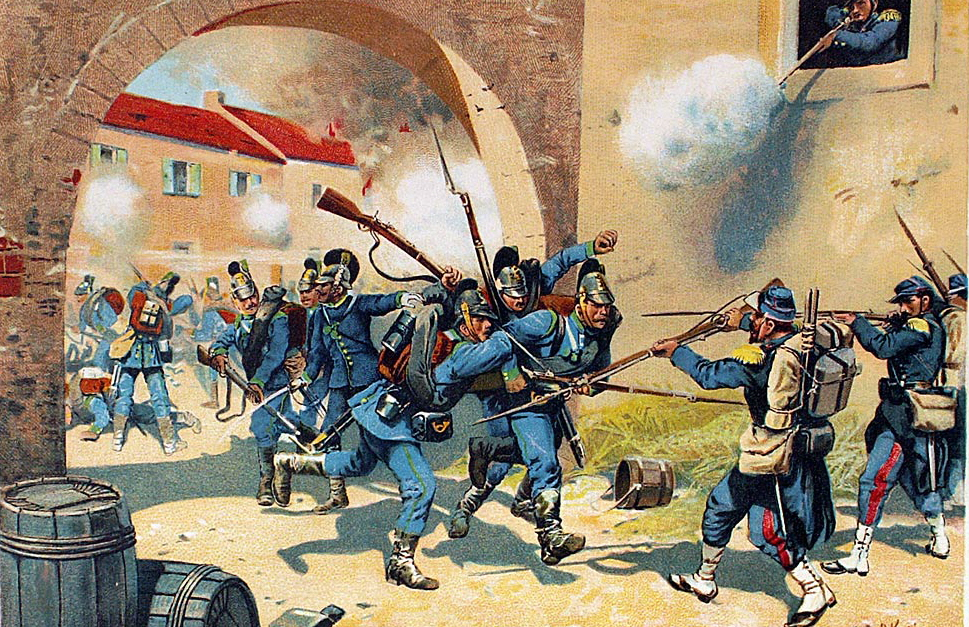
Bavarian soldiers during the Battle of Bazeilles, 1870

Due to this criticism, King Ludwig II appointed the battle-hardened veteran General Siegmund von Pranckh as the new War Minister on 1 August. Von Pranckh already had political experience as adjutant to War Minister von Lüder, and contributed crucially to the modernisation of the Bavarian Army with his reforms.

When the candidacy to the Spanish throne of Leopold, Prince of Hohenzollern led to a worsening in relations between Prussia and France in 1870, von Prankh mobilised the two Bavarian army corps on 14 July. The Bavarian Army Corps fought in the Franco-Prussian War as part of the III Army under Crown Prince Frederick (the I Army Corps under von der Tann, and the II Army Corps under Jakob von Hartmann).

The Bavarians under von Hartmann stormed Wissembourg and took part in the Battles of Wörth, Beaumont, Sedan and the Siege of Paris. Over 5,000 Bavarian soldiers died during the Franco-Prussian War.

=== 1871–1918: The German Empire ===
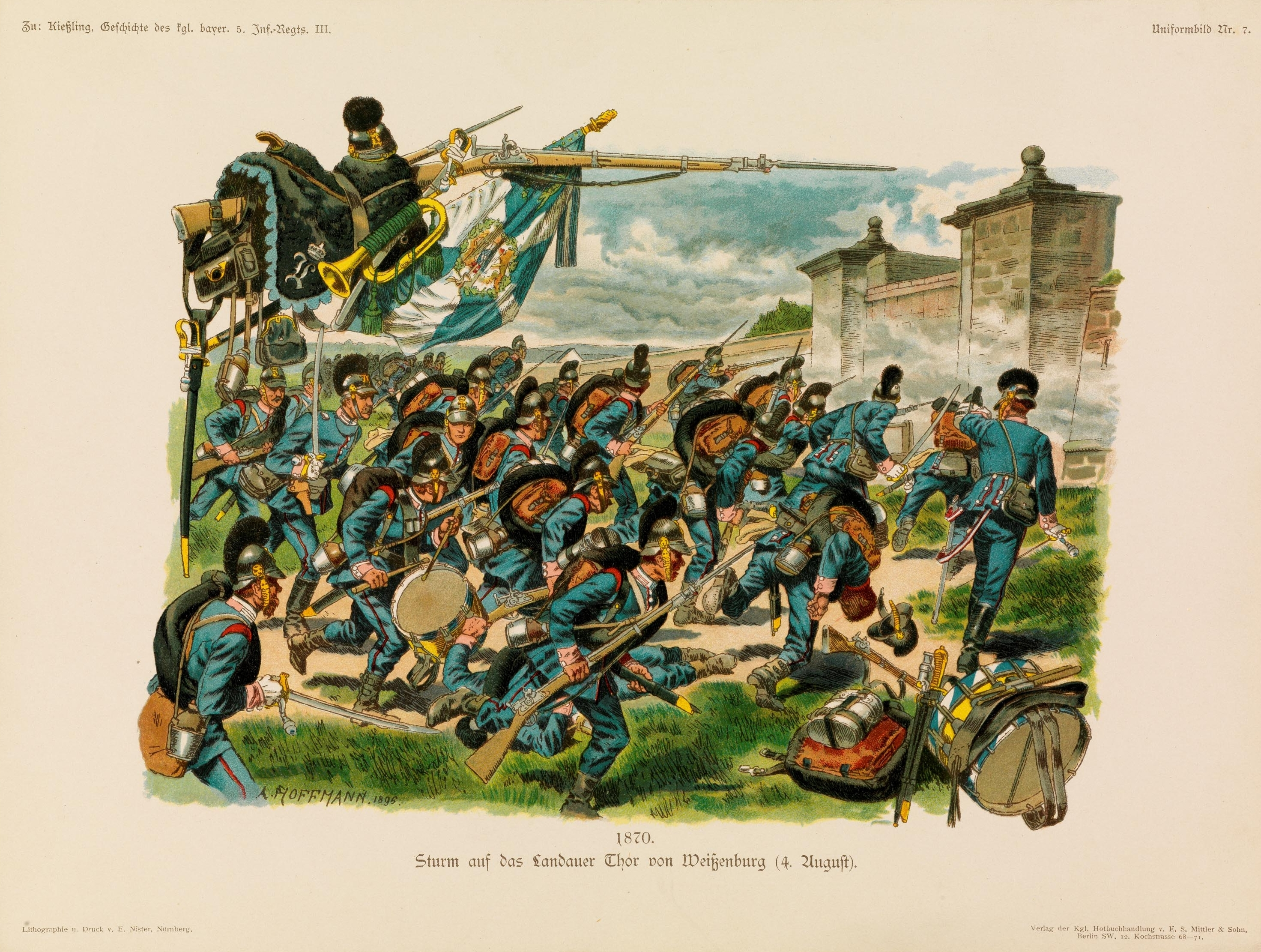
Bavarian Army equipment and uniforms during the 1870s

In the Constitution of the German Empire, Bavaria was able to secure for itself extensive rights, in particular regarding military sovereignty. Not only did the army retain, like the kingdoms of Saxony and Württemberg, its own troops, War Ministry and military justice system, but it was also excluded from the Empire-wide regimental re-numbering of the army regiments and would only come under Imperial German Army control in times of war. Bavaria also kept its light-blue infantry uniforms, the Raupenhelm (until 1886), the Light Cavalry and some other peculiarities. The officers and men of the Bavarian Army continued to swear their oaths to the King of Bavaria and not the German Emperor. Nevertheless, the uniform cut, equipment and training was standardised to the Prussian model. When field-grey uniforms were introduced, only the cockade and a blue-and-white lozenge edging to the collar distinguished Bavarian units.

At the beginning of World War I, the Bavarian Army had an effective strength of 87,214 men including 4,089 officers, physicians, veterinarians and officials; and 83,125 NCOs and other ranks, plus 16,918 horses. With the beginning of mobilisation on 1 August 1914, the supreme command of the Bavarian field army passed from the 4th Army Inspectorate to the German Emperor. Units in Bavaria remained under the command of the Bavarian War Ministry. The Bavarian Army — consisting of the three Bavarian Army Corps, the Bavarian Cavalry Division — was bolstered by the addition of the XXI Corps (of two divisions, recruited largely in the Rhineland and Westphalia), and transported to the Western Front as the German 6th Army under the command of Crown Prince Rupprecht.

The Bavarian Army fought at the Battle of the Frontiers, the last time that it fought together as a single unit: the exclusive Bavarian command of Bavarian forces began to be diluted from the Imperial German Army reorganisations in Autumn 1914 onwards. Rupprecht held command for the duration of the war and was promoted to Field Marshal in 1916 largely on account of his outstanding ability; however, after Frontiers, the units under his command came largely from outside Bavaria.

Although the German Empire fell in the German Revolution of 1918–19, and King Ludwig III was forced to abdicate, Bavaria retained its military sovereignty. However, the rise of the Bavarian Soviet Republic and the confusion surrounding its overthrow and the defeat of its "Red Army" persuaded the drafters of the Bamberg Constitution of 1919 to relinquish military sovereignty to the Weimar Republic. At any rate, the regular Bavarian troops had been demobilised after the war to the extent that most of the fighting against the Red Army was done by Freikorps units and other German troops from outside Bavaria.

During World War I, around 200,000 soldiers of the Royal Bavarian Army were killed.

== Structure ==
=== Pre and early World War One ===
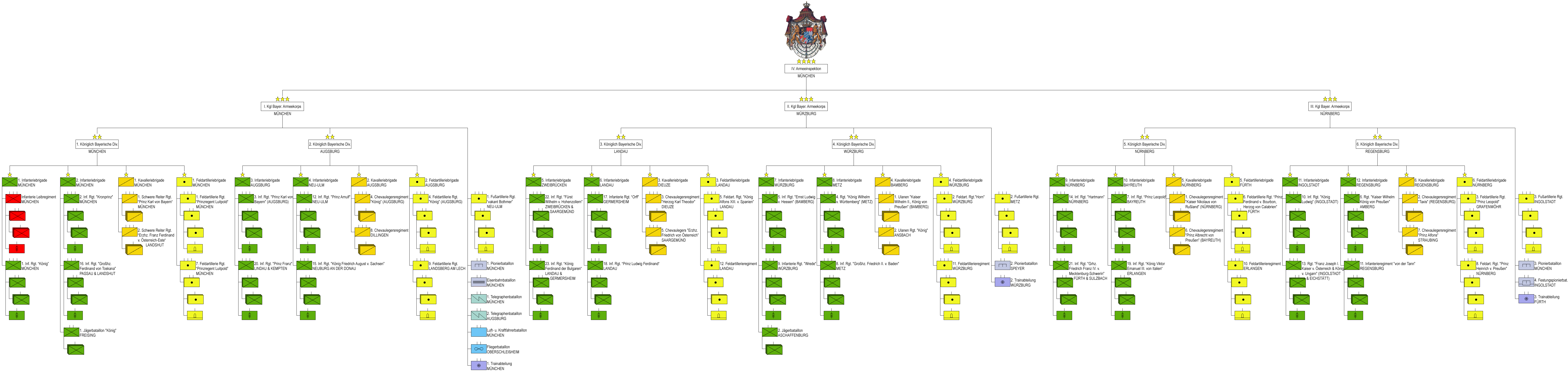
Structure of the Royal Bavarian Army in 1914

Bavaria placed at first two and later three army corps in the army of the German Empire:

- I Army Corps in Munich
  - 1st Division in Munich
  - 2nd Division in Augsburg
- II Army Corps in Würzburg
  - 3rd Division in Landau
  - 4th Division in Würzburg
- III Army Corps in Nuremberg
  - 5th Division in Nuremberg
  - 6th Division in Regensburg

=== Raised during World War I ===
Corps

- I Royal Bavarian Reserve Corps
- II Royal Bavarian Reserve Corps
- XV Royal Bavarian Reserve Corps

Divisions

Bavarian cavalry:

- Bavarian Cavalry Division

Bavarian infantry:

- 10th Bavarian Infantry Division
- 11th Bavarian Infantry Division
- 12th Bavarian Infantry Division
- 14th Bavarian Infantry Division
- 15th Bavarian Infantry Division
- 16th Bavarian Infantry Division

Bavarian reserve:

- 1st Bavarian Reserve Division
- 5th Bavarian Reserve Division
- 6th Bavarian Reserve Division
- 8th Bavarian Reserve Division
- 9th Bavarian Reserve Division
- 30th Bavarian Reserve Division
- 39th Bavarian Reserve Division

Bavarian Landwehr:

- 1st Bavarian Landwehr Division
- 2nd Bavarian Landwehr Division
- 6th Bavarian Landwehr Division

Bavarian Ersatz:

- Bavarian Ersatz Division

Mountain Troops:

- Alpenkorps

=== Officer corps ===
The Bavarian Army had a smaller proportion of aristocratic officers than the Prussian Army: in 1832 there were 1.86 common officers for every one noble; by 1862 it was 2.34 commoners for every noble and by the outbreak of the First World War 5.66. Since the dissolution in 1826 of the Lifeguard unit, there was no specific Guard regiment. Only in the following units was the proportion of aristocratic officers considerably higher than average:

- 1st Royal Bavarian Heavy Cavalry Regiment "Prince Karl of Bavaria" (formerly 1st Cuirassiers).
- 1st Royal Bavarian Uhlan Regiment "Emperor Wilhelm II, King of Prussia"
- Royal Bavarian Infantry Lifeguards Regiment

=== NCO corps ===
The Bavarian NCO Corps consisted of long-serving and career soldiers, usually recruited from those completing military service. There was a strict career separation between officers and NCOs. This led to substantial social problems during World War I, because qualified NCOs were blocked from promotion to officer ranks.

=== Recruitment ===
According to the Constitution of 1808, recruitment was according to a system of conscription. The system offered the possibility for men to buy exemption from conscription by means of paying a substitute, called an Einsteher ("Proxy") or Einstandsmann ("Stand-In"), to serve in their place (which had to be for a longer time).

The reforms of 1868 abolished the use of substitutes, introduced compulsory conscription for three years, and instituted the Einjährig-Freiwilliger ("One Year Volunteer") system.

=== Landwehr ===
In 1809, after the French model, the territorial forces were converted into a national guard, which from 1814 to 1868 was known as the Landwehr of the Kingdom of Bavaria. During the 1868 reforms, the older classes of reserves became known as the Landsturm. The Landwehr also took responsibility for supervising the veterans' associations.

=== Garrisons ===
The bulk of the Bavarian Army was housed in fortresses, secularised monasteries and former castles. The first co-ordinated programme of barracks-building took place in 1806 (such as the New Isar Barracks), and after a typhoid outbreak in 1881, modern buildings with married quarters were built (such as the Prince Leopold Barracks). In 1838, Bavaria maintained seven fortresses, with another under construction:

- Forchheim
- Ingolstadt
- Veste Oberhaus
- Rosenberg ob Kronach
- Rothenberg bei Schnaittach
- Wülzburg
- Marienberg Fortress in Würzburg
- Germersheim (under construction)

Bavaria also maintained troops in the German Confederation fortresses of Landau and Ulm. The fortress of Germersheim was de-fortified according to the Treaty of Versailles.

== Museum ==
The museum for the Bavarian Army was moved from the Hofgarten in Munich into the New Castle in Ingolstadt.

== See also ==
- Hartschier
- Ministry of War (Kingdom of Bavaria)
- Quartermaster Generals and Chiefs of the General Staff of the Army
