= Ersatz Corps =

Ersatz Corps Ersatzkorps
- Flag of the Staff of a Generalkommando (1871–1918)
- Active: 18 August 1914 – 18 September 1914
- Country: German Empire
- Type: Corps
- Engagements: World War I

The Ersatz Corps (German: Ersatzkorps) was a corps level command of the German Army that existed briefly at the beginning of World War I.

== History ==
The Ersatz Corps was formed on 18 August 1914 under the command of 6th Army to control the Ersatz divisions of that army (Guards, 4th, 8th, 10th and 19th), hence the name of the Corps. General der Infanterie Ludwig von Falkenhausen was brought out of retirement to take command during its brief existence .

Ersatz is German for "replacement". Ersatz divisions were formed on mobilisation from replacement units of active regiments. Each brigade replacement battalion (Brigade-Ersatz-Bataillone) was numbered after its parent infantry brigade, and was formed with two companies taken from each of the brigade's replacement battalions (of which there was one per infantry regiment). Cavalry Ersatz Abteilungen and Field Artillery Ersatz Abteilungen were likewise formed from active cavalry and field artillery regiments.

Armee-Abteilung Falkenhausen was set up in the southern part of the Western Front in Alsace-Lorraine on 17 September 1914 from the parts of 6th Army that remained in Lorraine after the main body marched north to participate in the Race to the Sea. The Staff of the Ersatz Corps and its commander took command of the Armee-Abteilung and the Ersatz Corps ceased to exist.

== See also ==
- German Army order of battle (1914)

== Bibliography ==
- Cron, Hermann (2002). Imperial German Army 1914-18: Organisation, Structure, Orders-of-Battle [first published: 1937]. Helion & Co. ISBN 1-874622-70-1.
- Ellis, John; Cox, Michael (1993). The World War I Databook. Aurum Press Ltd. ISBN 1-85410-766-6.
- Busche, Hartwig (1998). Formationsgeschichte der Deutschen Infanterie im Ersten Weltkrieg (1914 bis 1918) (in German). Institut für Preußische Historiographie.
- Histories of Two Hundred and Fifty-One Divisions of the German Army which Participated in the War (1914-1918), compiled from records of Intelligence section of the General Staff, American Expeditionary Forces, at General Headquarters, Chaumont, France 1919. The London Stamp Exchange Ltd. 1989 [1920]. ISBN 0-948130-87-3.
- The German Forces in the Field; 7th Revision, 11th November 1918; Compiled by the General Staff, War Office. Imperial War Museum, London and the Battery Press. 1995 [1918]. ISBN 978-1-870423-95-3.
