= XV Royal Bavarian Reserve Corps =

World War I military unit

XV Royal Bavarian Reserve Corps XV. Königlich Bayerisches Reserve-Korps
- Flag of the Staff of a Generalkommando (1871–1918)
- Active: 1 September 1914 - post November 1918
- Country: Bavaria / German Empire
- Type: Corps
- Engagements: World War I

Insignia
- Abbreviation: XV Bavarian RK

The XV Royal Bavarian Reserve Corps / XV Bavarian RK (German: XV. Königlich Bayerisches Reserve-Korps) was a corps level command of the Royal Bavarian Army, part of the German Army, in World War I. (Note: From the late 1800s, the Prussian Army was effectively the German Army as, during the period of German unification (1866-1871), the states of the German Empire entered into conventions with Prussia regarding their armies. Only the Bavarian Army remained fully autonomous and came under Prussian control only during wartime.)

== History ==
The Corps was formed on 1 September 1914 as the temporary Corps Eberhardt, named for its commander General der Infanterie Magnus von Eberhardt, military governor of Strasbourg, then in the German Imperial territory of Alsace-Lorraine. On 1 December 1914, it was established as XV Reserve Corps and, on 1 September 1916, it was renamed as XV Bavarian Reserve Corps. It was still in existence at the end of the war in Armee-Abteilung A, Heeresgruppe Herzog Albrecht von Württemberg on the Western Front.

On 15 September 1914, Corps Eberhardt totalled 43 battalions, 6 squadrons, 30 batteries (172 guns) & 9 Pioneer companies. It was organized as follows:

Corps	Division	Brigade	Units
Korps Eberhardt		Donon-Brigade	Reserve Infantry Regiment 70 (2 Btns)
Korps Eberhardt		Donon-Brigade	III. Battalion/ Landwehr Infantry Regiment 120
Korps Eberhardt		Donon-Brigade	Ersatz Battalion/ Landwehr Infantry Regiment 99
Korps Eberhardt		Donon-Brigade	1st Squadron/ Reserve Hussar Regiment 9
Korps Eberhardt		Donon-Brigade	1st Battery/ Field Artillery Ersatz Abteilung 13
Korps Eberhardt		Donon-Brigade	One Battery, 9-cm cannons (8 guns)
Korps Eberhardt		Donon-Brigade	Landwehr Pioneer Battalion 15 (2 Cos.)
Korps Eberhardt		Donon-Brigade	Ersatz Pioneer Co. 15
Korps Eberhardt		Donon-Brigade	Landsturm Pioneer Co., XV A.K.
Korps Eberhardt	30th Reserve Division	10th Bavarian Reserve Infantry Brigade	Bavarian Reserve Infantry Regiment 11 (2 Btns)
Korps Eberhardt	30th Reserve Division	10th Bavarian Reserve Infantry Brigade	Bavarian Reserve Infantry Regiment 14
Korps Eberhardt	30th Reserve Division	55th Ersatz Brigade	55th, 56th, 57th, 58th, 82nd & 84th Brigade Ersatz Btns.
Korps Eberhardt	30th Reserve Division	55th Ersatz Brigade	Cavalry Ersatz Abteilung Karlsruhe (1/3 sq.)
Korps Eberhardt	30th Reserve Division	55th Ersatz Brigade	Field Artillery Ersatz Abteilungen 14 & 76 (each 2 Btys)
Korps Eberhardt	30th Reserve Division	5th Bavarian Ersatz Brigade	5th, 6th, 7th & 8th Bavarian Brigade Ersatz Battalions
Korps Eberhardt	30th Reserve Division	5th Bavarian Ersatz Brigade	Cavalry Ersatz Abteilung Landau (1/3 sq.)
Korps Eberhardt	30th Reserve Division	5th Bavarian Ersatz Brigade	2nd & 12th Bavarian Field Artillery Ersatz Abteilungen (each 2 Btys)
Korps Eberhardt	30th Reserve Division	42nd Landwehr Brigade	II Battalion/ Landwehr Infantry Regiment 80
Korps Eberhardt	30th Reserve Division	42nd Landwehr Brigade	Landwehr Infantry Regiment 81
Korps Eberhardt	30th Reserve Division	Divisional Units	2nd Squadron/ Reserve Hussar Regiment 9
Korps Eberhardt	30th Reserve Division	Divisional Units	Ersatz Squadron/ Dragoon Regiment 20
Korps Eberhardt	30th Reserve Division	Divisional Units	Field Artillery Ersatz Abteilungen 15, 31, 51, 80 & 84 (each 2 Btys)
Korps Eberhardt	30th Reserve Division	Divisional Units	Bavarian Field Artillery Ersatz Abteilung 4 (3 Btys)
Korps Eberhardt	30th Reserve Division	Divisional Units	5th Battery/ Reserve Foot Artillery Rgt. 10 (heavy field howitzers)
Korps Eberhardt	30th Reserve Division	Divisional Units	3rd Battery/ Reserve Foot Artillery Rgt. 14 (10-cm cannons)
Korps Eberhardt	30th Reserve Division	Divisional Units	4th & 1st Reserve Cos./ Pioneer Battalion 15
Korps Eberhardt	Bavarian Ersatz Division	1st Bavarian Ersatz Brigade	1st, 2nd, 3rd & 4th Bavarian Brigade Ersatz Battalions
Korps Eberhardt	Bavarian Ersatz Division	1st Bavarian Ersatz Brigade	Bavarian Reserve Infantry Regiment 4 (4 Btns)
Korps Eberhardt	Bavarian Ersatz Division	1st Bavarian Ersatz Brigade	Cavalry Ersatz Abteilung Munich (1/3 sq.)
Korps Eberhardt	Bavarian Ersatz Division	1st Bavarian Ersatz Brigade	1st & 4th Bavarian Field Artillery Ersatz Abteilungen (each 2 Btys)
Korps Eberhardt	Bavarian Ersatz Division	1st Bavarian Ersatz Brigade	2nd Ersatz Co./ Bavarian Pioneer Battalion 1
Korps Eberhardt	Bavarian Ersatz Division	9th Bavarian Ersatz Brigade	9th, 10th, 11th & 12th Bavarian Brigade Ersatz Battalions
Korps Eberhardt	Bavarian Ersatz Division	9th Bavarian Ersatz Brigade	Bavarian Reserve Infantry Regiment 15
Korps Eberhardt	Bavarian Ersatz Division	9th Bavarian Ersatz Brigade	II. Battalion/ Reserve Infantry Regiment 60
Korps Eberhardt	Bavarian Ersatz Division	9th Bavarian Ersatz Brigade	Cavalry Ersatz Abteilung Nuremberg (1/3 sq.)
Korps Eberhardt	Bavarian Ersatz Division	9th Bavarian Ersatz Brigade	8th & 10th Bavarian Field Artillery Ersatz Abteilungen (each 2 Btys)
Korps Eberhardt	Bavarian Ersatz Division	9th Bavarian Ersatz Brigade	1st Ersatz Co./ Bavarian Pioneer Battalion 3
Korps Eberhardt	Bavarian Ersatz Division	Divisional Units	3rd Squadron/ Reserve Hussar Regiment 9
Korps Eberhardt	Bavarian Ersatz Division	Divisional Units	Bavarian Cavalry Ersatz Abteilung
Korps Eberhardt	Bavarian Ersatz Division	Divisional Units	Bavarian Field Artillery Ersatz Abteilungen 1 (2 Btys), 2 & 3 (each 3 Btys)
Korps Eberhardt	Bavarian Ersatz Division	Divisional Units	7th Battery/ Foot Artillery Rgt. 13 (10-cm cannons)
Korps Eberhardt	Bavarian Ersatz Division	Divisional Units	3rd Battery/ Reserve Foot Artillery 13 (heavy field howitzers)
Korps Eberhardt	Bavarian Ersatz Division	Divisional Units	2nd Bavarian Ersatz Pioneer Company
Korps Eberhardt	Abteilung Ferling	Brigade Rekowski	I. & II. Battalions/ Landwehr Infantry Regiment 120
Korps Eberhardt	Abteilung Ferling	Brigade Rekowski	I. & III. Battalions/ Landwehr Infantry Regiment 80
Korps Eberhardt	Abteilung Ferling	Brigade Rekowski	III. Battalion/ Landwehr Infantry Regiment 71
Korps Eberhardt	Abteilung Ferling	Brigade Rekowski	One Landwehr Squadron
Korps Eberhardt	Abteilung Ferling	Brigade Rekowski	2nd Battery/ Field Artillery Ersatz Abteilung 13
Korps Eberhardt	Abteilung Ferling	Brigade Rekowski	2nd Battery/ Bavarian Field Artillery Ersatz Abteilung 1
Korps Eberhardt	Abteilung Ferling	Brigade Rekowski	4th Battery/ Reserve Foot Artillery Rgt 14 (10-cm cannons)
Korps Eberhardt	Abteilung Ferling	Brigade Rekowski	2nd Reserve Co./ Pioneer Battalion 15

On 10 December 1914, XV Reserve Corps was organized as follows:

Corps	Division	Brigade	Units
XV Reserve Corps	30th Reserve Division	10th Bavarian Reserve Infantry Brigade	Bavarian Reserve Infantry Regiment 11 (2 Btns)
XV Reserve Corps	30th Reserve Division	10th Bavarian Reserve Infantry Brigade	Bavarian Reserve Infantry Regiment 14
XV Reserve Corps	30th Reserve Division	5th Bavarian Ersatz Brigade	2nd Bavarian Ersatz Regiment
XV Reserve Corps	30th Reserve Division	5th Bavarian Ersatz Brigade	4th Bavarian Ersatz Regiment
XV Reserve Corps	30th Reserve Division	Divisional Units	1st & 2nd Squadrons/ Reserve Hussar Regiment 9
XV Reserve Corps	30th Reserve Division	Divisional Units	Field Artillery Ersatz Abteilungen 31, 51 & 80
XV Reserve Corps	30th Reserve Division	Divisional Units	4th Co./ Pioneer Battalion 15
XV Reserve Corps	30th Reserve Division	Divisional Units	Attached: 3rd Battery/ Reserve Foot Artillery Rgt. 14 (10-cm cannons)
XV Reserve Corps	39th Reserve Division	1st Bavarian Ersatz Brigade	1st Bavarian Ersatz Regiment
XV Reserve Corps	39th Reserve Division	1st Bavarian Ersatz Brigade	3rd Bavarian Ersatz Regiment
XV Reserve Corps	39th Reserve Division	9th Bavarian Ersatz Brigade	2nd & 9th Bavarian Brigade Ersatz Battalions
XV Reserve Corps	39th Reserve Division	9th Bavarian Ersatz Brigade	Landwehr Infantry Regiment 81
XV Reserve Corps	39th Reserve Division	Divisional Units	3rd Squadron/ Reserve Hussar Regiment 9
XV Reserve Corps	39th Reserve Division	Divisional Units	Bavarian Field Artillery Ersatz Abteilung 10
XV Reserve Corps	39th Reserve Division	Divisional Units	2nd Battery/ Bavarian Field Artillery Ersatz Abteilung 4
XV Reserve Corps	39th Reserve Division	Divisional Units	1st Battery/ Bavarian Field Artillery Ersatz Abteilung 8
XV Reserve Corps	39th Reserve Division	Divisional Units	2nd Ersatz Co./ Bavarian Pioneer Battalion 1
XV Reserve Corps	39th Reserve Division	Divisional Units	1st Ersatz Co./ Bavarian Pioneer Battalion 3
XV Reserve Corps	39th Reserve Division	Divisional Units	Attached: 5th Battery/ Reserve Foot Artillery Rgt. 10 (heavy field howitzers), 2/3 2nd Battery/ Bavarian Landwehr Foot Artillery Btl 1. (heavy field howitzers), 7th Battery/ Foot Artillery Rgt. 13 (10-cm cannons), 1/2 1st Battery/ Reserve Foot Artillery Rgt. 10 (13-cm cannons), 2nd Landwehr Pioneer Co., XIII A.K.
XV Reserve Corps	Attached	52nd Landwehr Brigade	Landwehr Infantry Regiment 80
XV Reserve Corps	Attached	52nd Landwehr Brigade	Ersatz Infantry Regiment 29
XV Reserve Corps	Attached	52nd Landwehr Brigade	1st Landwehr Squadron, XIV A.K.
XV Reserve Corps	Attached	52nd Landwehr Brigade	2nd Battery/ Field Artillery Ersatz Abteilung 13
XV Reserve Corps	Attached	52nd Landwehr Brigade	Attached: 2nd Battery/ Landwehr Foot Artillery Btl. 10 (heavy field howitzers), 4th Battery/ Reserve Foot Artillery Rgt 14 (10-cm cannons), 1/2 2nd Battery/ Reserve Foot Artillery Rgt. 10 (13-cm cannons), 2nd Reserve Co./ Pioneer Btl. 15, Pioneer Co. 14
XV Reserve Corps	Attached	84th Landwehr Brigade	I. & II. Battalions/ Reserve Infantry Regiment 70
XV Reserve Corps	Attached	84th Landwehr Brigade	Ersatz Battalion/ Landwehr Infantry Regiment 99
XV Reserve Corps	Attached	84th Landwehr Brigade	1st Battery/ Field Artillery Ersatz Abteilung 13
XV Reserve Corps	Attached	84th Landwehr Brigade	Attached: 1/3 2nd Bavarian Landwehr Foot Artillery Btl. 1 (heavy field howitzers), Landsturm Pioneer Co., XV A.K.

== Commanders ==
Korps Eberhardt / XV Reserve Corps / XV Bavarian Reserve Corps had the following commanders during its existence:

From	Rank	Name
1 September 1914	General der Infanterie	Magnus von Eberhardt
16 October 1916	General der Artillerie	Maximilian von Höhn
8 August 1918	Generalleutnant	Paul von Kneussl

== See also ==
- Bavarian Army
- 30th Bavarian Reserve Division
- 39th Bavarian Reserve Division
- XV Corps (German Empire)
- German Army order of battle, Western Front (1918)

== Bibliography ==
- Cron, Hermann (2002). Imperial German Army 1914-18: Organisation, Structure, Orders-of-Battle [first published: 1937]. Helion & Co. ISBN 1-874622-70-1.
- Ellis, John; Cox, Michael (1993). The World War I Databook. Aurum Press Ltd. ISBN 1-85410-766-6.
- Histories of Two Hundred and Fifty-One Divisions of the German Army which Participated in the War (1914-1918), compiled from records of Intelligence section of the General Staff, American Expeditionary Forces, at General Headquarters, Chaumont, France 1919. The London Stamp Exchange Ltd. 1989 [1920]. ISBN 0-948130-87-3.
- The German Forces in the Field; 7th Revision, 11th November 1918; Compiled by the General Staff, War Office. Imperial War Museum, London and the Battery Press. 1995 [1918]. ISBN 978-1-870423-95-3.
- Der Weltkrieg 1914 Bis 1918. Berlin: Mittler. 1929.
