= High command =

The phrase high command may refer to:

== Non-fiction high commands ==
- High Command of Capital Hanoi (Bộ tư lệnh Thủ đô Hà Nội) of Vietnam
- German high commands up to and during World War I:
  - German Imperial Naval High Command (Kaiserliches Oberkommando der Marine), 1889-1899 German naval command
  - High Command of Coastal Defence (Küstenverteidigung), World War I German coastal defence
- German high commands up to and during World War II:
  - German High Command (Oberkommando der Wehrmacht, OKW), German armed-forces command structure, 1938-1945
    - German Army High Command (Oberkommando des Heeres, OKH), de facto World War II German command on the Eastern front
    - Oberkommando der Luftwaffe (OKL), Luftwaffe high command, 1935-1945
    - Oberkommando der Marine (OKM), Kriegsmarine high command, 1936-1945
  - German High SS and Police Leader command (Höhere SS und Polizeiführer, HSSPF), 1939–1945, reporting only to Reichsführer SS Heinrich Himmler
- High Command Trial, post-World War II war-crimes trial
- Norwegian High Command (Forsvarets Overkommando), Norway's top military leadership from 1970 to 2003
- Mobile Barracks of High Command (行轅), Chinese government regional office on behalf of a military commander
- Stavka, the military high command of Russian and Soviet armed forces

== In fiction ==
- Vulcan High Command, in the fictional Star Trek universe
- Squirrel High Command, in the action-adventure video game series Conker
- The High Command, a 1938 British drama film
- Squadron Supreme: High Command, a collected edition of the Marvel Comics series Squadron Supreme

== See also ==
- Commander-in-Chief
- Defence minister
- Chain of command
- Command (military formation)
- Staff (military)
- Warlord
