= General von Falkenhausen =

May refer to:

- Ludwig von Falkenhausen (1844–1936), military governor of Belgium during the German occupation of Belgium in World War I.
- Alexander von Falkenhausen (1878–1966), military governor of Belgium during the German occupation of Belgium in World War II.
