= 243rd Division =

243rd Division may refer to:

- 243rd Infantry Division (German Empire)
- 243rd Static Infantry Division, Wehrmacht, Germany
- 243rd Rifle Division, Soviet Union

== See also ==
- List of military divisions by number
