= Bavarian Ersatz Division =

Bavarian division of the Imperial German Army in World War I

Bavarian Ersatz Division (Bayerische Ersatz Division)
- Active: 1914-1919
- Country: Bavaria/Germany
- Branch: Army
- Type: Infantry
- Size: Approx. 15,000
- Engagements: World War I: Battle of the Frontiers, Race to the Sea, Verdun, Second Battle of the Aisne, Battle of Passchendaele, Romanian Campaign, Hundred Days Offensive

The Bavarian Ersatz Division (Bayerische Ersatz Division) was a Bavarian division of the Imperial German Army in World War I. It was formed in August 1914 and dissolved on 6 October 1918. It was initially a Bavarian formation but soon received several non-Bavarian units which served with the division until 1917.

== Combat narrative ==
The division first saw action in 1914 in the Battle of the Frontiers, including the battles before Nancy and Epinal. The division participated in the Race to the Sea and then settled into trench warfare. The divisional commander, General der Infanterie Eugen Ritter von Benzino, was killed in action on November 28, 1915. In 1916, the division entered into the Battle of Verdun and fought on the Somme in October. The division also was engaged in 1917 in the Second Battle of the Aisne, also called the Third Battle of Champagne and referred to in German sources as the Dual Battle of Aisne-Champagne (Doppelschlacht Aisne-Champagne). After a short spell in the trenches near Verdun, in the latter part of 1917, the division was sent to Flanders in response to the Allied offensive there. In October 1917, the division went to the Romanian Front and then to Ukraine after the armistice in Romania. It returned to the Western Front in April 1918, occupying the line near Verdun, then Reims and then engaged in mobile defense. It ended the war facing Allied forces in the Hundred Days Offensive. The division was rated as a third class division by Allied intelligence.

== Formation and organization on mobilization ==
On mobilization, the Bavarian Army formed twelve Brigade Replacement Battalions (Brigade-Ersatz-Bataillone) by grouping companies taken from the replacement (Ersatz) battalion of each infantry regiment. These battalions were then formed into three mixed brigades of four battalions each, together with Ersatz cavalry, artillery and engineer units, which were formed from the replacement detachments and companies of the cavalry and artillery regiments and the engineer battalions.

The order of battle of the Bavarian Ersatz Division on mobilization was:

- Stab/1. Königlich Bayerische gemischte Ersatz-Brigade
  - Königlich Bayerisches Brigade-Ersatz-Bataillon Nr. 1
  - Königlich Bayerisches Brigade-Ersatz-Bataillon Nr. 2
  - Königlich Bayerisches Brigade-Ersatz-Bataillon Nr. 3
  - Königlich Bayerisches Brigade-Ersatz-Bataillon Nr. 4
  - Kavallerie-Ersatz-Abteilung München/I. Königlich Bayerisches Armeekorps (1/3 squadron)
  - Königlich Bayerische Feldartillerie-Ersatz-Abteilung Nr. 1 (2 batteries)
  - Königlich Bayerische Feldartillerie-Ersatz-Abteilung Nr. 4 (2 batteries)
  - 2. Ersatz-Kompanie/Königlich Bayerisches 1. Pionier-Bataillon
- Stab/5. Königlich Bayerische gemischte Ersatz-Brigade
  - Königlich Bayerisches Brigade-Ersatz-Bataillon Nr. 5
  - Königlich Bayerisches Brigade-Ersatz-Bataillon Nr. 6
  - Königlich Bayerisches Brigade-Ersatz-Bataillon Nr. 7
  - Königlich Bayerisches Brigade-Ersatz-Bataillon Nr. 8
  - Kavallerie-Ersatz-Abteilung Landau/II. Königlich Bayerisches Armeekorps (1/3 squadron)
  - Königlich Bayerische Feldartillerie-Ersatz-Abteilung Nr. 2 (2 batteries)
  - Königlich Bayerische Feldartillerie-Ersatz-Abteilung Nr. 12 (2 batteries)
- Stab/9. Königlich Bayerische gemischte Ersatz-Brigade
  - Königlich Bayerisches Brigade-Ersatz-Bataillon Nr. 9
  - Königlich Bayerisches Brigade-Ersatz-Bataillon Nr. 10
  - Königlich Bayerisches Brigade-Ersatz-Bataillon Nr. 11
  - Königlich Bayerisches Brigade-Ersatz-Bataillon Nr. 12
  - Kavallerie-Ersatz-Abteilung Nürnberg/III. Königlich Bayerisches Armeekorps (1/3 squadron)
  - Königlich Bayerische Feldartillerie-Ersatz-Abteilung Nr. 8 (2 batteries)
  - Königlich Bayerische Feldartillerie-Ersatz-Abteilung Nr. 10 (2 batteries)
  - 1. Ersatz-Kompanie/Königlich Bayerisches 3. Pionier-Bataillon

== Organizational changes and late-war organization ==
The 5th Mixed Replacement Brigade (5. gemischte Ersatz-Brigade) was transferred to the 30th Reserve Division on August 17, 1914.

The order of battle of the Bavarian Ersatz Division on September 15, 1914 was:

Bavarian Ersatz Division

- 1st Bavarian Ersatz Brigade
  - 1st, 2nd, 3rd & 4th Bavarian Brigade Ersatz Battalions
  - Bavarian Reserve Infantry Regiment 4 (four battalions)
  - Cavalry Ersatz Abteilung Munich (1/3 sq.)
  - 1st & 4th Bavarian Field Artillery Ersatz Abteilungen (four batteries)
  - 2nd Ersatz Co./Bavarian Pioneer 1
- 9th Bavarian Ersatz Brigade
  - 9th, 10th, 11th & 12th Bavarian Brigade Ersatz Battalions
  - Bavarian Reserve Infantry Regiment 15
  - II. Battalion/ Reserve Infantry Regiment 60
  - Cavalry Ersatz Abteilung Nuremberg (1/3 sq.)
  - 8th & 10th Bavarian Field Artillery Ersatz Abteilungen (four batteries)
  - 1st Ersatz Co./Bavarian Pioneer 3
- Divisional Troops
  - 3rd Squadron/ Reserve Hussar Regiment 9
  - Bavarian Cavalry Ersatz Abteilung
  - Bavarian Field Artillery Ersatz Abteilungen 1 (two batteries), 2 & 3 (each three batteries)
  - 7th Battery/ Foot Artillery Rgt. 13 (10-cm cannons)
  - 3rd Battery/ Reserve Foot Artillery 13 (heavy field howitzers)
  - 2nd Bavarian Ersatz Pioneer Company

On October 3, 1914, the new Bavarian 3rd Reserve Brigade joined the division from the 30th Reserve Division. In addition, the 1st and 9th Mixed Replacement Brigades were redesignated as the 1st and 9th Replacement Brigades and their cavalry, artillery and engineer units were moved to division level. Three battalions from each brigade were reorganized into Kgl. Bayer. Ersatz-Infanterie-Regiment Nr.1 (1st Replacement Brigade) and Kgl. Bayer. Ersatz-Infanterie-Regiment Nr.3 (9th Replacement Brigade). Prior to November 20, these two regiments were transferred to "Division von Rekowski" (which later became the 39th Bavarian Reserve Division). Kgl. Bayer. Ersatz-Infanterie-Regiment Nr.2 was formed from two battalions of the 5th Mixed Replacement Brigade as well as troops drawn from elsewhere in the Bavarian Army; it was attached to the Bavarian Ersatz Division.

On November 22, 1914, the 59th Replacement Infantry Brigade (Ersatz-Infanterie-Brigade), a non-Bavarian unit, was renamed the 59th Landwehr Infantry Brigade (59. Landwehr-Infanterie-Brigade) and attached to the Bavarian Ersatz Division.

On December 10, 1914, the division consisted of:

- Bavarian 3rd Reserve Infantry Brigade:
  - Bavarian Reserve Infantry Regiment 4 (4 battalions)
  - Bavarian Reserve Infantry Regiment 15
- 59th Landwehr Infantry Brigade
  - Landwehr Infantry Regiment 120
  - Ersatz Infantry Regiment 28
- Divisional Troops
  - Cavalry Ersatz Abteilungen des I, II & III Bavarian A.K.
  - Bavarian Field Artillery Ersatz Abteilungen 1, 2, 12
  - 1st Battery/Bavarian Field Artillery Ersatz Abteilung 4
  - 2d Battery/Bavarian Field Artillery Ersatz Abteilung 8
  - 1st Company/Reserve Pioneer Battalion 15

The organization of the division on April 7, 1918 was as follows:

- 3.Kgl. Bayer. Reserve-Infanterie-Brigade:
  - Kgl. Bayer. 4. Reserve-Infanterie-Regiment
  - Kgl. Bayer. 15. Reserve-Infanterie-Regiment
  - Kgl. Bayer. 18. Reserve-Infanterie-Regiment
- 1. Eskadron/Kgl. Bayer. 6. Reserve-Kavallerie-Regiment
- Kgl. Bayer. Artillerie-Kommandeur 19:
  - Kgl. Bayer. Ersatz-Feldartillerie-Regiment
  - Fußartillerie-Bataillon Nr. 89
- Stab Kgl. Bayer. 13. Pionier-Bataillon:
  - Kgl. Bayer. 4. Landwehr-Pionier-Kompanie
  - Kgl. Bayer. 6. Landwehr-Pionier-Kompanie
  - Kgl. Bayer. 100. Minenwerfer-Kompanie
- Kgl. Bayer. Divisions-Nachrichten-Kommandeur 551
