= 9th Bavarian Reserve Division =

9th Bavarian Reserve Division (9. Bayerische Reserve-Division)
- Active: 1916-1918
- Country: Bavaria/Germany
- Branch: Army
- Type: Infantry
- Size: Approx. 12,500
- Engagements: World War I: Second Battle of the Aisne, Passchendaele, Battle of Cambrai (1917), German spring offensive, First Battle of the Somme (1918), Montdidier-Noyon

The 9th Bavarian Reserve Division (9. Bayerische Reserve-Division) was a unit of the Imperial German Army in World War I. The division was formed on September 26, 1916, and entered the line in October. It was a Bavarian unit and was part of a large wave of new divisions (approximately 40) formed in the summer and autumn of 1916. It was disbanded in June 1918 and its assets distributed to other units.

== Order of battle on formation ==
The 9th Bavarian Reserve Division was formed as a triangular division. The order of battle of the division on October 25, 1916, was as follows:

- 17. Bayer. Reserve-Infanterie-Brigade
  - Kgl. Bayer. Ersatz-Infanterie-Regiment Nr. 3
  - Kgl. Bayer. Landwehr-Infanterie-Regiment Nr. 8
  - Kgl. Bayer. Reserve-Infanterie-Regiment Nr. 14
- 1. Eskadron/Kgl. Bayer. Reserve-Kavallerie-Regiment Nr. 1
- Kgl. Bayer. Reserve-Feldartillerie-Regiment Nr. 11
- 4. Kompanie/Kgl. Bayer. 2. Pionier-Bataillon
- Minenwerfer-Kompanie Nr. 209

== Combat chronicle ==
The 9th Bavarian Reserve Division fought on the Western Front, seeing its first action on the Aisne, where it remained until December 1916 when it went into reserve until late January. It then returned to the trenchlines along the Aisne, and fought in the Second Battle of the Aisne, also called the Third Battle of Champagne. The division then went to the trenchlines in Lorraine. It went to Flanders in August and saw action in the Battle of Passchendaele, also known as the Third Battle of Ypres. It then returned to the southern part of the front and went into the St. Mihiel salient. The division returned to Flanders in November 1917 and saw action in the Allied tank attack in the Battle of Cambrai, as well as the subsequent German counterattack. In 1918, the division fought in the German spring offensive, seeing action in the First Battle of the Somme (1918), also known as the Second Battle of the Somme (to distinguish it from the 1916 battle). They were decisively beaten by the 15th Australian Brigade in a counterattack at Villers-Bretonneux that effectively ended the offensive. The 9th Bavarian Reserve Division's last major action was in the German attack in the Montdidier-Noyon sector in June 1918. The division was dissolved soon thereafter. Allied intelligence rated the division as second class.

== Order of battle on March 21, 1918 ==
Over the course of the war, various structural changes took place, including the formation of artillery and signals commands and the expansion of combat engineer support to a full pioneer battalion. The order of battle on March 21, 1918, was as follows:

- 17. Bayer. Reserve-Infanterie-Brigade:
  - Kgl. Bayer. Ersatz-Infanterie-Regiment Nr. 3
  - Kgl. Bayer. Reserve-Infanterie-Regiment Nr. 11
  - Kgl. Bayer. Reserve-Infanterie-Regiment Nr. 14
- 1. Eskadron/Kgl. Bayer. Reserve-Kavallerie-Regiment Nr. 1
- Kgl. Bayer. Artillerie-Kommandeur 9
  - Kgl. Bayer. 4. Feldartillerie-Regiment König
  - Fußartillerie-Bataillon Nr. 50
- Kgl. Bayer. Pionier-Bataillon Nr. 21
  - Kgl. Bayer. Pionier-Kompanie Nr. 8
  - Kgl. Bayer. Reserve-Pionier-Kompanie Nr. 12
  - Kgl. Bayer. Minenwerfer-Kompanie Nr. 209
- Kgl. Bayer. Divisions-Nachrichten-Kommandeur 409
