= 10th Bavarian Infantry Division =

10th Bavarian Infantry Division (10. Bayerische Infanterie-Division)
- Active: 1915–1918
- Country: Bavaria; Germany
- Branch: Army
- Type: Infantry
- Size: Approx. 12,500
- Engagements: World War I: Battle of the Somme, Romanian campaign, Passchendaele, Second Battle of the Marne

The 10th Bavarian Infantry Division (10. Bayerische Infanterie-Division) was a unit of the Royal Bavarian Army, part of the Imperial German Army, in World War I. The division was formed on March 3, 1915, and organized over the next few weeks. It was part of a wave of new infantry divisions formed in the spring of 1915. The division was disbanded in August 1918 and its assets distributed to other units.

The division was formed primarily from the excess infantry regiments of existing divisions which were being triangularized. The division's 20th Bavarian Infantry Brigade was formerly the 1st Bavarian Infantry Brigade of the 1st Bavarian Infantry Division. The 16th Bavarian Infantry Regiment also came from the 1st Bavarian Infantry Division; the 6th Bavarian Reserve Infantry Regiment came from the 5th Bavarian Reserve Division; and the 8th Bavarian Reserve Infantry Regiment came from the 4th Bavarian Infantry Division.

== Combat chronicle ==
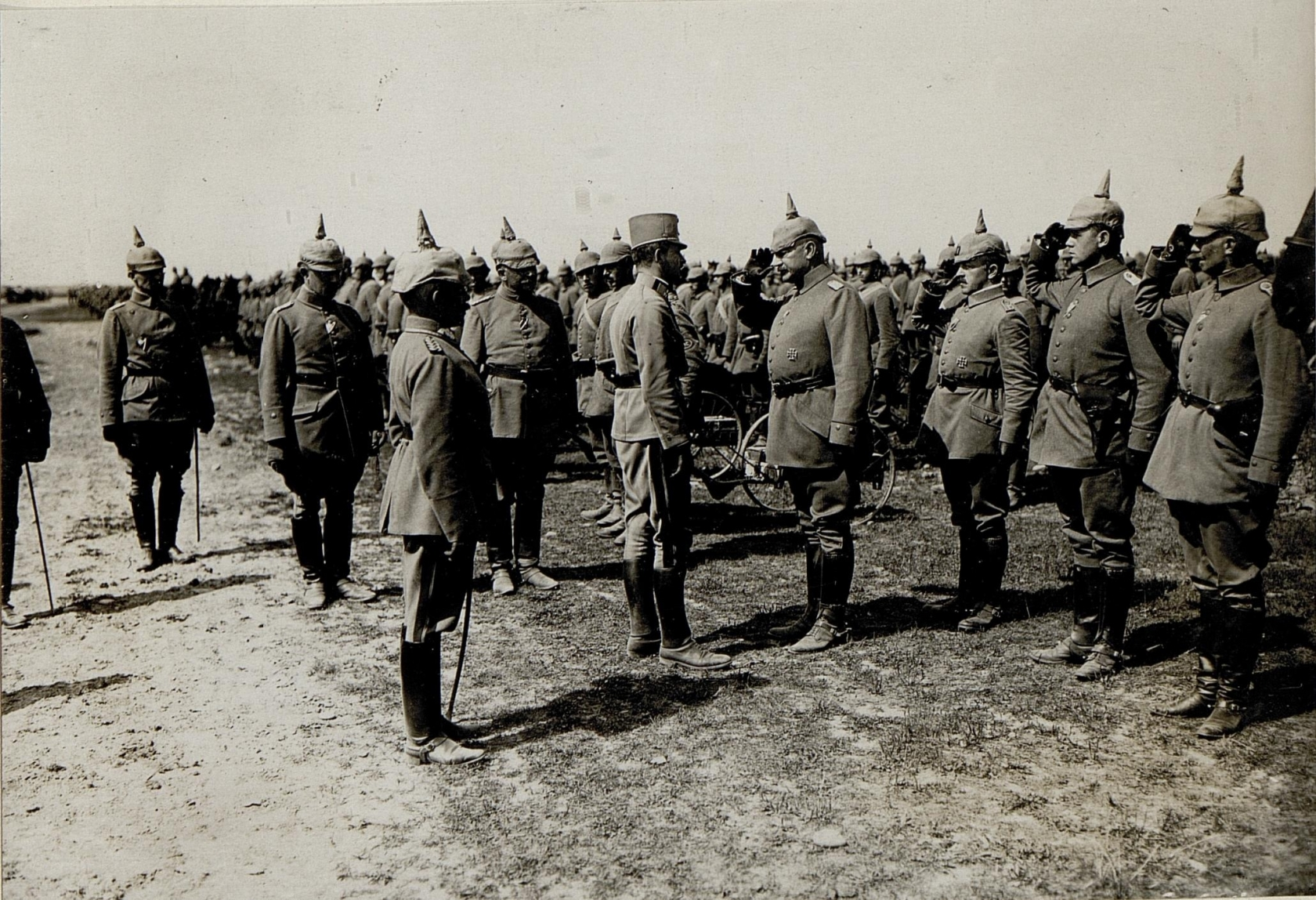
Charles I of Austria visits the 10th Bavarian Division, 19 August 1916

The 10th Bavarian Infantry Division initially served on the Western Front, entering the line on the Somme in March 1915. It remained on the Somme into 1916 and fought in the Battle of the Somme in June and July 1916. It was then transferred to the Eastern Front, arriving in Galicia in August. It then fought in the Romanian campaign, fighting in Bukovina and Transylvania. From February to May 1917, the division served on the Galician front under the Austro-Hungarian 2nd Army against the Russian Army, where it engaged in several assault troop (Stoßtrupp) operations. It then returned to the Western Front, arriving in Alsace at the end of May and remaining in the line there for several weeks. It then fought in the battles in Flanders known generally as the Battle of Passchendaele. In October 1917, the division left the line and returned to the Eastern Front, deploying along the Upper Styr and Stokhod rivers but reportedly seeing no action. In late November, it went back to the Western Front, and went into the line in Lorraine until May 1918. It then fought near Soissons for the next several months and in the Second Battle of the Marne. On August 6, 1918, the division was dissolved, with its assets distributed to other units. Allied intelligence rated the division as second class.

== Order of battle on formation ==
The 10th Bavarian Infantry Division was formed as a triangular division. The order of battle of the division on March 4, 1915, was as follows:

- 20. bayerische Infanterie-Brigade
  - Kgl. Bayerisches Reserve-Infanterie-Regiment Nr. 6
  - Kgl. Bayerisches Reserve-Infanterie-Regiment Nr. 8
  - Kgl. Bayerisches 16. Infanterie-Regiment Großherzog Ferdinand von Toskana
  - Kgl. Bayerische Radfahrer-Kompanie Nr. 10
- 3.Eskadron/Kgl. Bayerisches 5. Chevaulegers-Regiment Erzherzog Friedrich von Österreich
- 10. bayerische Feldartillerie-Brigade
  - Kgl. Bayerisches 19. Feldartillerie-Regiment
  - Kgl. Bayerisches 20. Feldartillerie-Regiment
  - Kgl. Bayerisches 10. Fußartillerie-Bataillon
- Kgl. Bayerische Pionier-Kompanie Nr. 19
- Kgl. Bayerische Pionier-Kompanie Nr. 20

== Late-war order of battle ==
The division underwent relatively few organizational changes over the course of the war. Artillery and signals commands were formed, and combat engineer support was expanded to a full pioneer battalion. The order of battle on February 15, 1918, was as follows:

- 20. bayerische Infanterie-Brigade
  - Kgl. Bayerisches Reserve-Infanterie-Regiment Nr. 6
  - Kgl. Bayerisches Reserve-Infanterie-Regiment Nr. 8
  - Kgl. Bayerisches 16. Infanterie-Regiment Großherzog Ferdinand von Toskana
- 3.Eskadron/Kgl. Bayerisches 5. Chevaulegers-Regiment Erzherzog Friedrich von Österreich
- Kgl. Bayerischer Artillerie-Kommandeur 10
  - Kgl. Bayerisches 20. Feldartillerie-Regiment
  - Kgl. Bayerisches 17. Fußartillerie-Bataillon
- Kgl. Bayerisches Pionier-Bataillon Nr. 10
  - Kgl. Bayerische Pionier-Kompanie Nr. 20
  - Kgl. Bayerische Pionier-Kompanie Nr. 23
  - Kgl. Bayerische Minenwerfer-Kompanie Nr. 10
- Kgl. Bayerischer Divisions-Nachrichten-Kommandeur 10

== Gallery ==
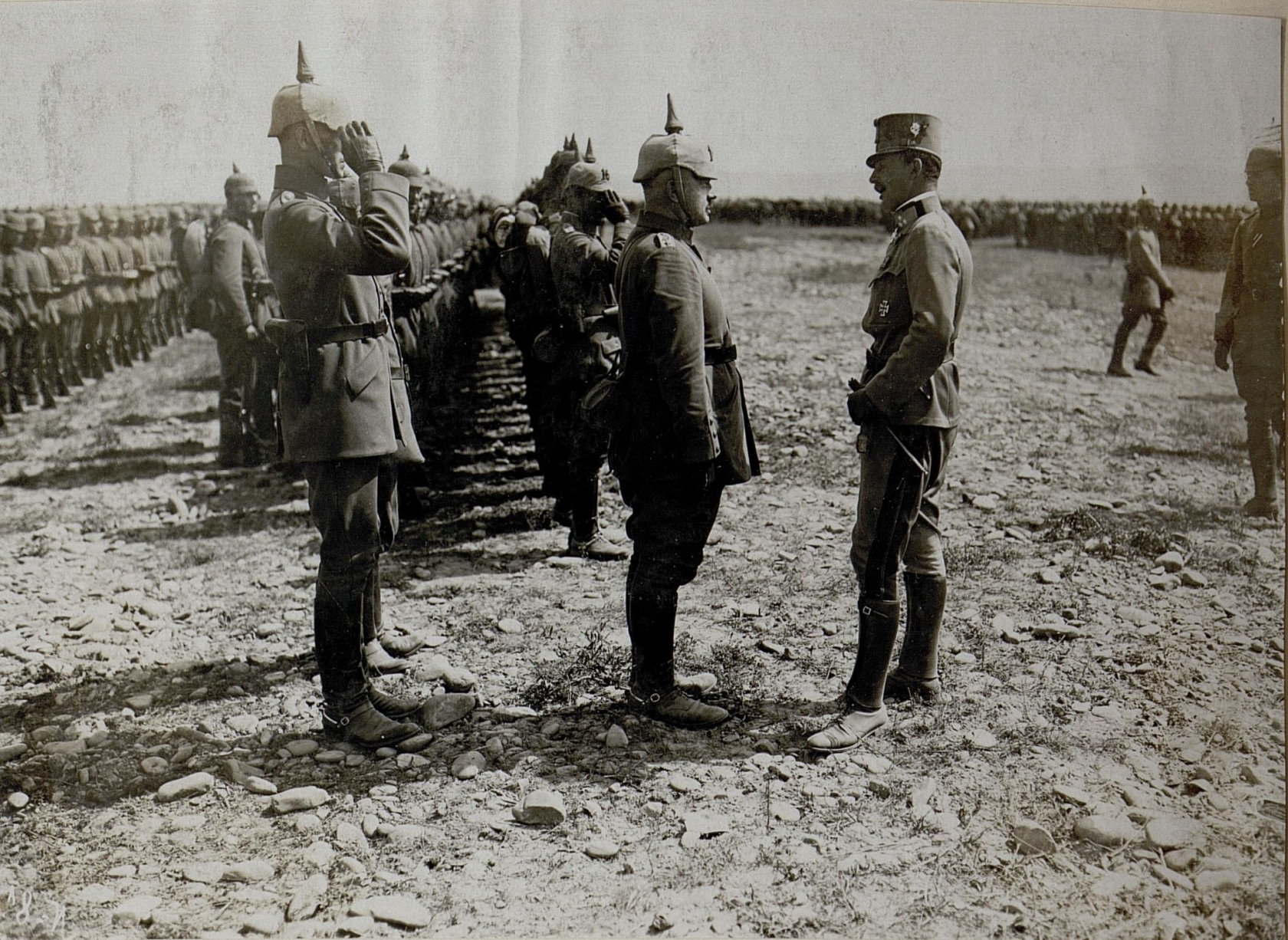
19 August 1916

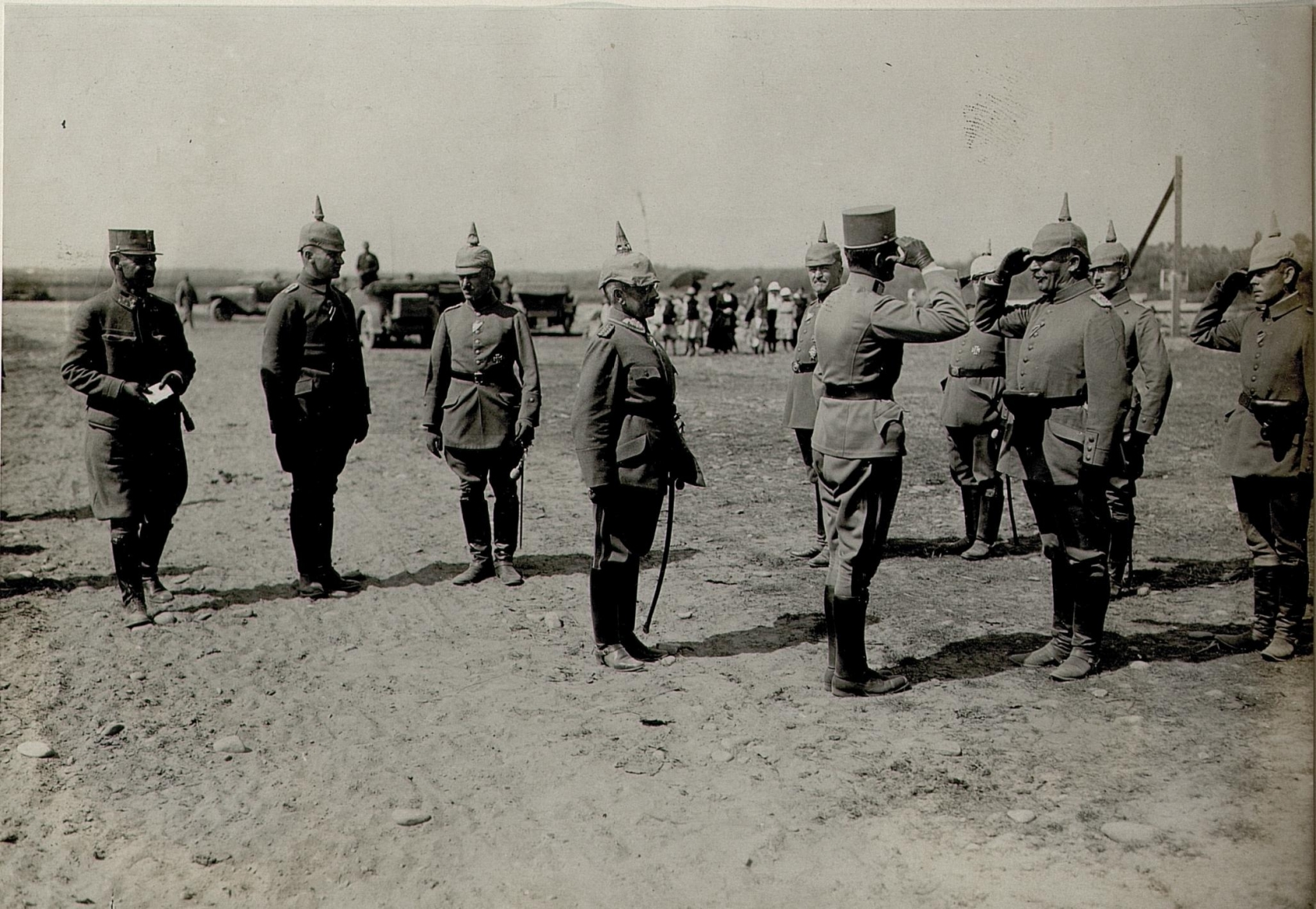
19 August 1916

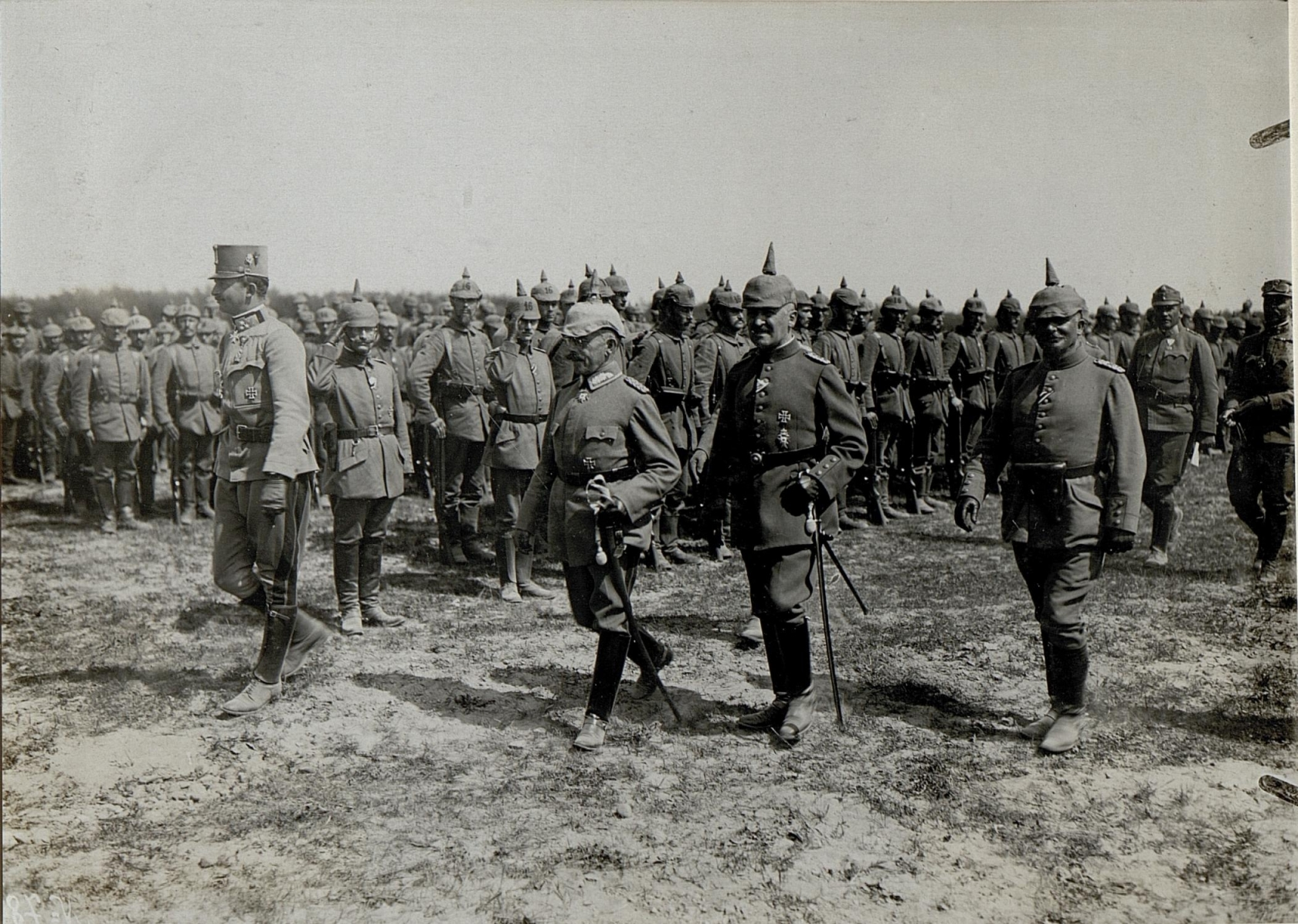
19 August 1916

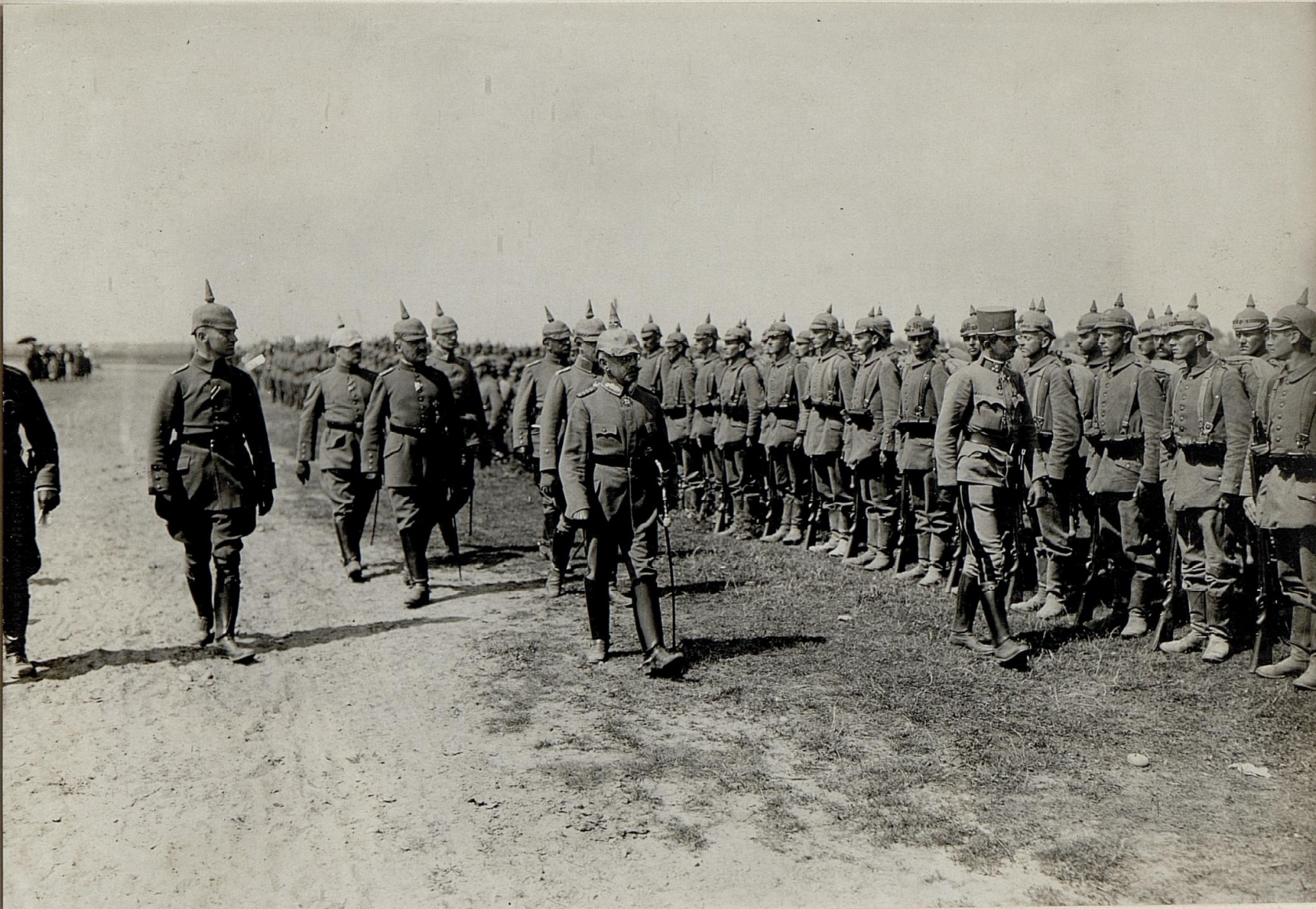
19 August 1916

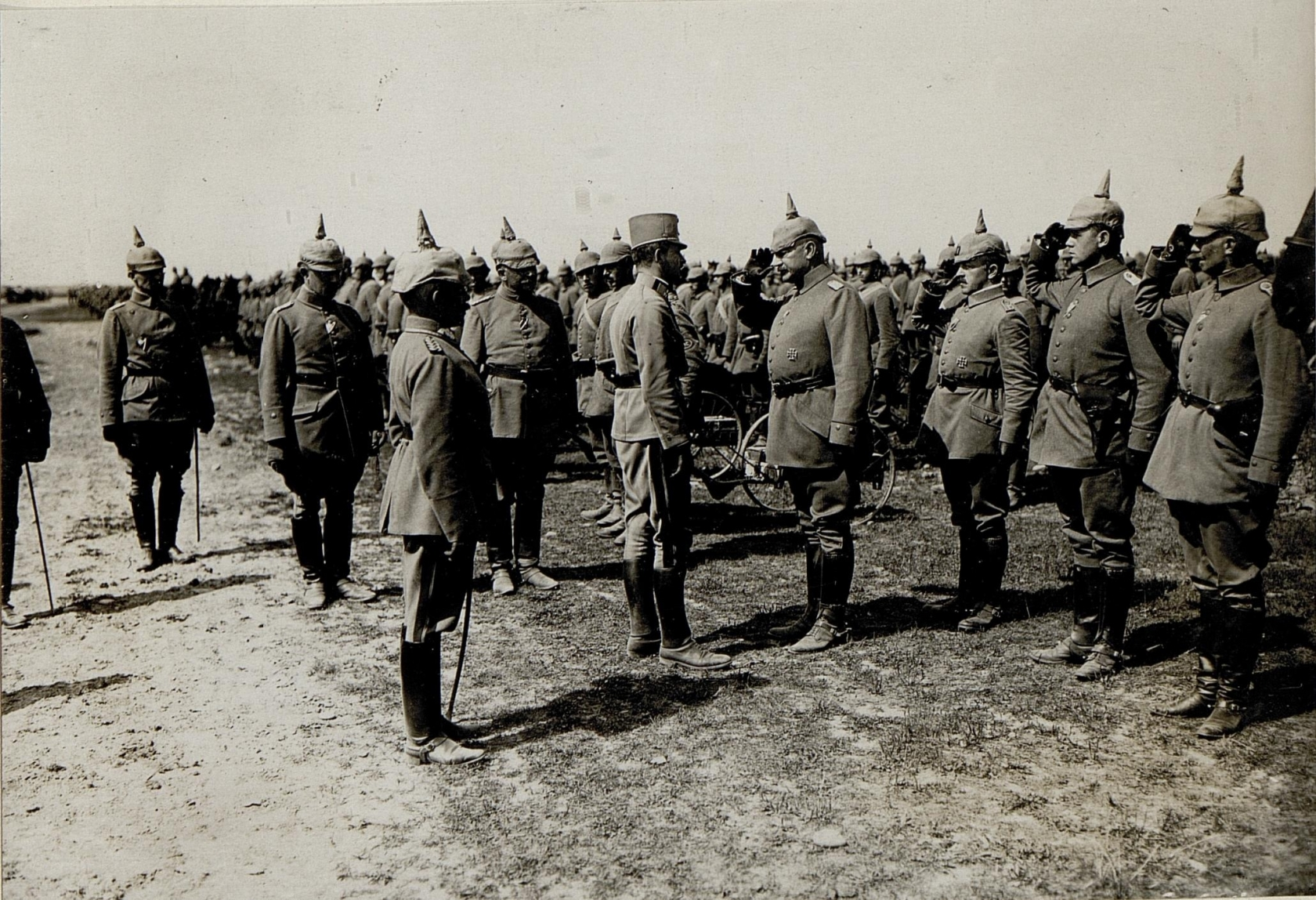
19 August 1916

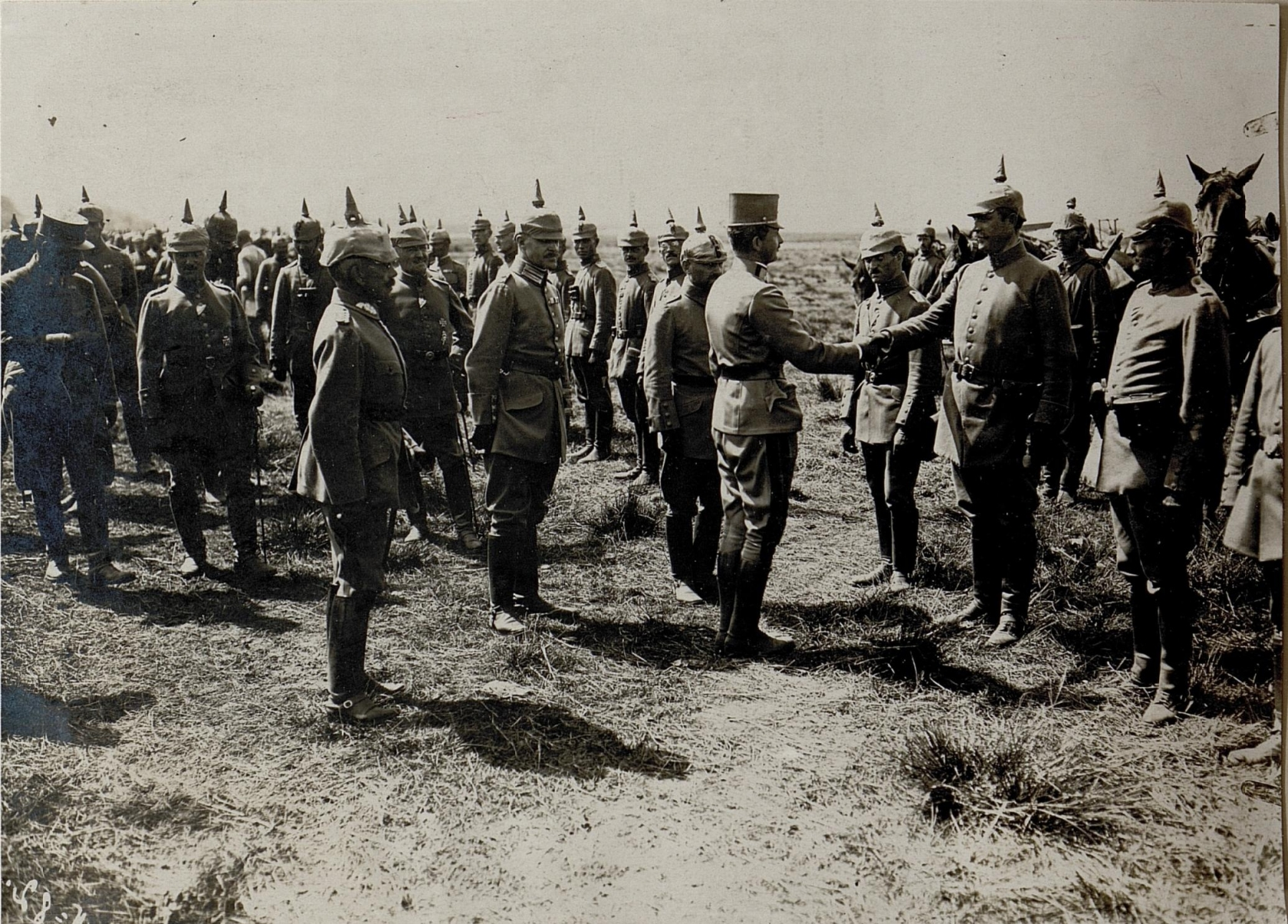
19 August 1916

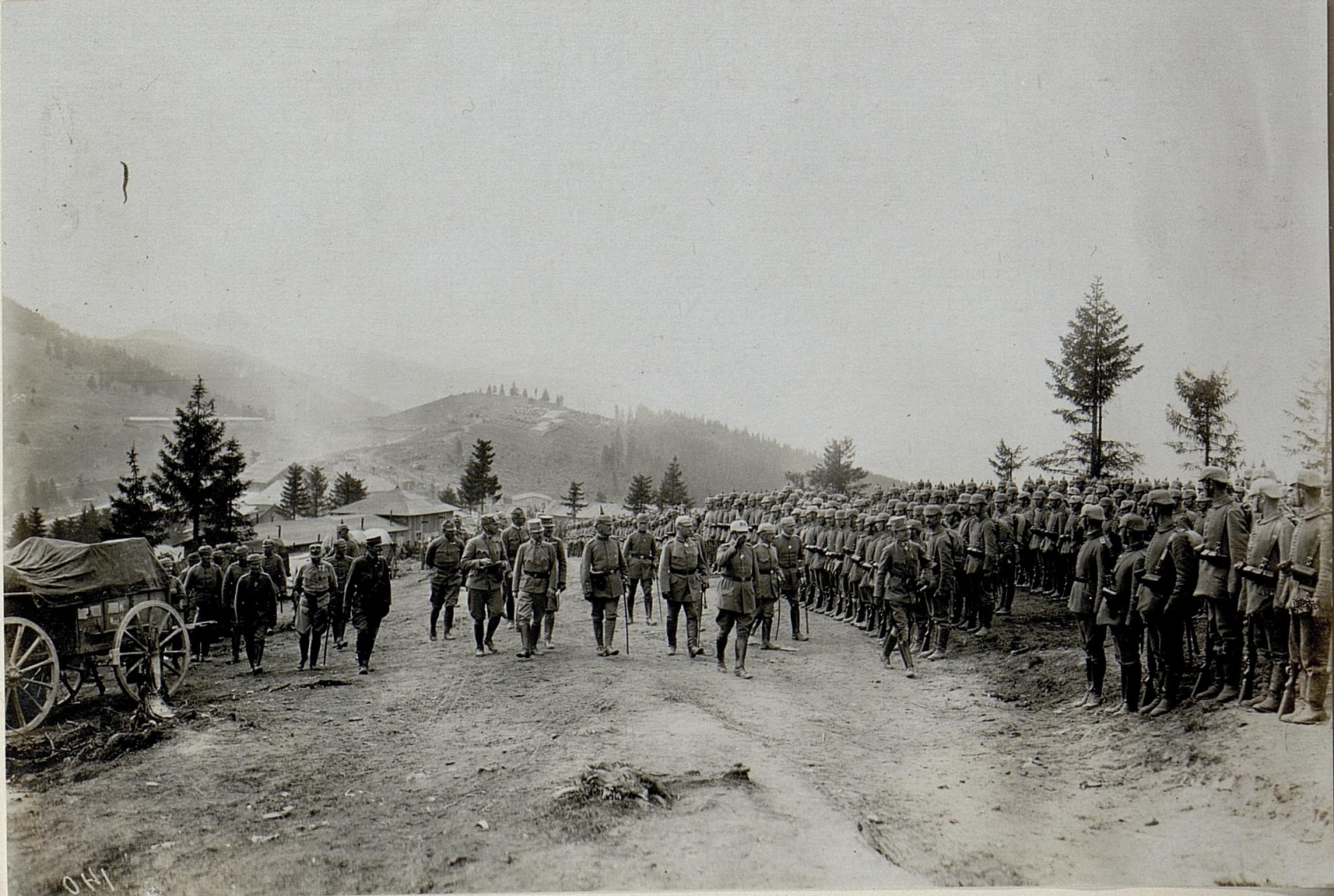
11 September 1916
