= 243rd Infantry Division (German Empire) =

243rd Infantry Division (243. Infanterie-Division)
- Active: 1917–19
- Country: Württemberg, German Empire
- Branch: Army
- Type: Infantry
- Size: About 15,000
- Engagements: World War I: Second Battle of the Aisne; Spring Offensive; Hundred Days Offensive

The 243rd Infantry Division (243. Infanterie-Division) was a division of the Imperial German Army during World War I. The division was established on April 1, 1917, by the renaming of the 8th Ersatz Division. The 8th Ersatz Division had been officially redesignated a Royal Württemberg infantry division two months earlier and the 243rd Infantry Division retained the ties to that kingdom.

The division fought in the Second Battle of the Aisne, also called the Third Battle of Champagne, in the spring of 1917. It spent the rest of 1917 and the first part of 1918 in positional warfare near Reims and in fighting around Verdun. In 1918, the division participated in the German spring offensive, in the Somme region. The division was on the defensive thereafter, including during the Allied Hundred Days Offensive. The division was demobilized in 1919. In 1917, Allied intelligence rated the division a good division, but of mediocre combat value, and by 1918 it was rated a third class division.

== Organization ==
The organization of the division on March 24, 1918, was as follows:

- 247. Infanterie-Brigade:
  - Füsilier-Regiment Kaiser Franz Josef von Österreich, König von Ungarn (4. Württembergisches) Nr. 122
  - Württembergisches Infanterie-Regiment Nr. 478 (former Ersatz-Infanterie-Regiment Nr. 51)
  - Württembergisches Infanterie-Regiment Nr. 479 (former Ersatz-Infanterie-Regiment Nr. 52)
  - Maschinengewehr-Scharfschützen-Abteilung Nr. 77
- 3.Eskadron/Ulanen-Regiment König Karl (1. Württembergisches) Nr. 19
- Artillerie-Kommandeur 135:
  - Württembergisches Feldartillerie-Regiment Nr. 238
  - Fußartillerie-Bataillon Nr. 82
- Pionier-Bataillon Nr. 243
- Divisions-Nachrichten-Kommandeur 243
