= Ludwig von Falkenhausen =

German general

Freiherr Ludwig von Falkenhausen
- Falkenhausen in 1914
- Born: 13 September 1844; Guben, Province of Brandenburg, Kingdom of Prussia, German Confederation
- Died: 4 May 1936 (aged 91); Görlitz, Gau Silesia, German Reich
- Military career
- Allegiance: (Kingdom of Prussia) Prussia; German Confederation; North German Confederation; German Empire
- Branch: Prussian Army; Imperial German Army
- Service years: 1862–1902; 1914–1918
- Rank: Generaloberst
- Commands: Garde-Grenadier Regiment 4; 29th Infantry Brigade; XIII Corps; 6th Army
- Conflicts: Second Schleswig War; Austro-Prussian War; Franco-Prussian War; World War I
- Awards: Pour le Mérite
- Other work: Representative in the Reichsrat

Ludwig Alexander Friedrich August Philipp Freiherr von Falkenhausen (13 September 1844 – 4 May 1936) was a German officer most notable for his activities during World War I.

== Before World War I ==
Falkenhausen was born in Guben. His parents were the Prussian Lieutenant-General D. Alexander von Falkenhausen (1821–1889) and his wife Catherine née Rouanet (1825–1907). Falkenhausen first attended a private school in Berlin and then, from May 1856, was a Cadet in Potsdam at the age of 11. In 1859, he moved to the main military academy in Berlin.

On 6 May 1862, he was transferred to the 1st Foot Guards as a 2nd Lieutenant. Later, he was regimental adjutant of the combined Guards Reserve Infantry Regiment. At this position, Falkenhausen participated in both Second Schleswig War and 1866 campaign with the main army. Between October 1868 and May 1869, he served with the Guards Field Artillery as regimental adjutant.

In the Franco-Prussian War (1870–71), he participated in the battles of Gravelotte-St.Privat, Beaumont & Sedan and at the Siege of Paris. At the end of 1870, he was released from the position as regimental adjutant, and, from July 1871, he served as adjutant of the 28th Division in Karlsruhe.

In subsequent years, he was transferred several times: from the 40th Fusiliers to the Army General Staff, then to the General Staff of the 16th Division in Trier and the General Staff of the VIII Army Corps (Koblenz). In 1885, he was transferred as commander of the First Battalion (Cologne) in the 65th Infantry.

In March 1887, Falkenhausen was Chief of Staff of the Guards Corps (Berlin). In June 1890, he commanded the Queen Augusta Garde-Grenadier Regiment Nr 4 (Koblenz). Two years later, he led the 29th Infantry Brigade (Cologne) and 1893 was chief quartermaster of the Chief of General Staff of the Army. Between 1893 and 1895, he was also a member of the Study Commission of the Military Academy.

After working at the War Department, in January 1895 he became director of the General War Department in the Ministry of War. In February 1895, he was appointed representative in the Bundesrat.

In January 1897, he became commander of the 2nd Guards Infantry Division (Berlin), and then, in 1899, he became the commanding general of the XIII (Royal Württemberg) Corps. In March 1902, he retired but kept busy with military science studies.

== World War I ==
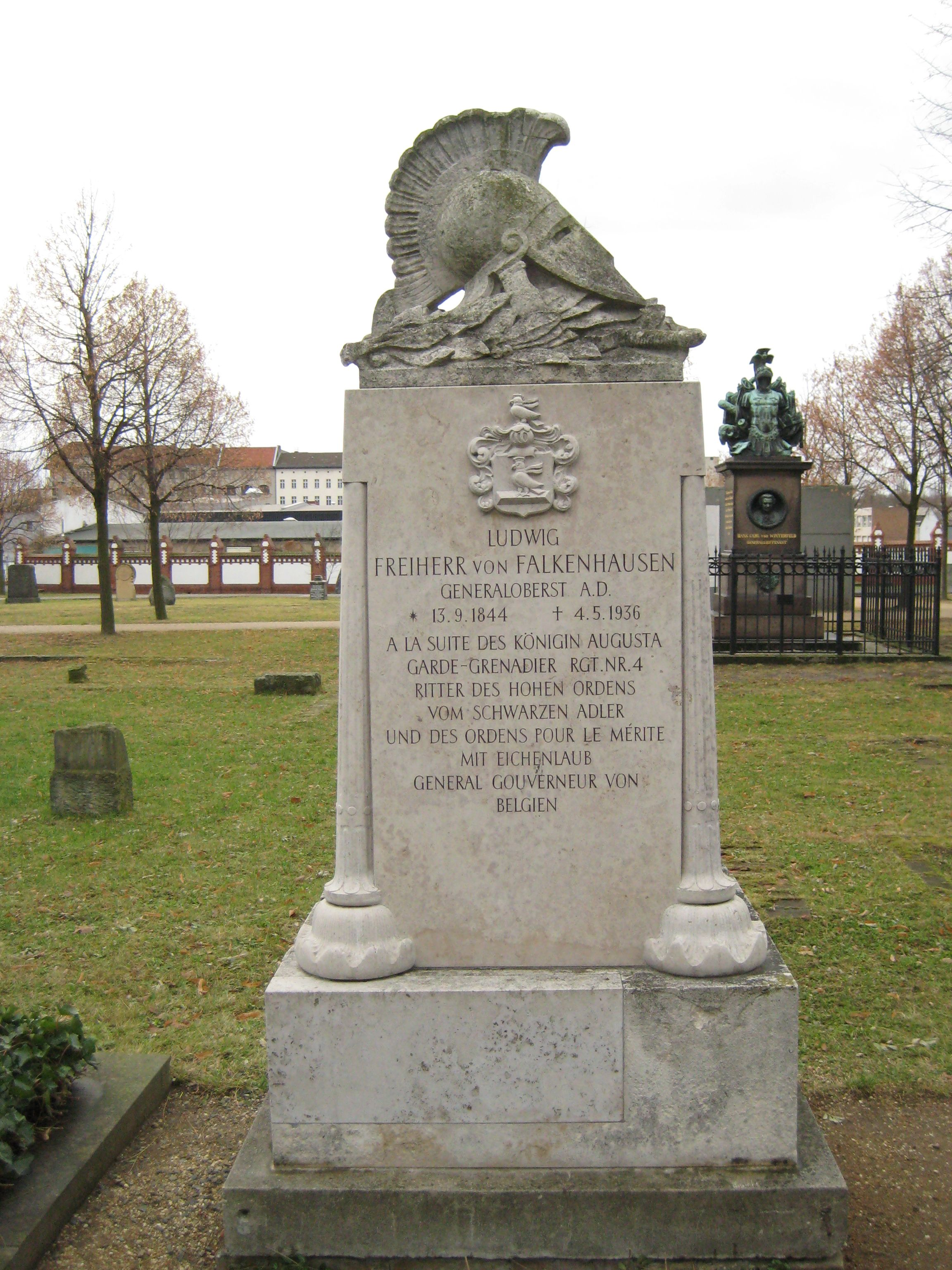
Falkenhausen's grave at Invalidenfriedhof, Berlin

Upon mobilization in August 1914, Falkenhausen became commanding general of the Ersatz Corps of the 6th Army. As commander of Armee-Abteilung Falkenhausen, he commanded the German troops during the battles for the 1914/15 Delmer back and in the trench warfare in Lorraine (1915-1916).

He was highly successful during the first half of World War I and was awarded the Pour le Mérite on 23 August 1915, with oak leaves following on 15 April 1916.

After having commanded the coastal defenses near Hamburg (April–September 1916), on 28 September 1916 Falkenhausen was given command of the 6th Army at the Battle of Arras in April 1917. He failed to deploy correctly the newly developed defence in depth to counter new British and Dominion tactics and was removed from field command by General Erich Ludendorff.

Thereafter, on 22 April 1917, he succeeded Moritz von Bissing and served as governor-general of the General Governorate of Belgium during the German occupation, from May 1917 until November 1918. In early 1918, The Times published an article – entitled Falkenhausen's reign of terror – describing 170 military executions of Belgian civilians that had taken place since he had been appointed governor.

== Death ==
Generaloberst a. D. Freiherr von Falkenhausen died on 4 May 1936 in Görlitz, Nazi Germany and was ceremoniously buried at the Invalidenfriedhof in Berlin.

== Family ==
During the Second World War, his nephew Alexander von Falkenhausen served as military governor of Belgium (22 May 1940 – 15 July 1944).

== Awards and decorations (excerpt) ==
German honours

- Knight of the Order of the Black Eagle, 27 January 1917 (Prussia)
- Pour le Mérite (military), 23 August 1915; with Oak Leaves, 25 April 1916 (Prussia)
- Iron Cross, 2nd Class (1870); 1st Class (1914) (Prussia)
- Knight of the Order of the Red Eagle, 2nd Class with Oak Leaves (Prussia)
- Knight of the Order of the Prussian Crown, 1st Class, 15 January 1899 (Prussia)
- Knight of Justice of the Johanniter Order (Prussia)
- Knight of the Order of the Zähringer Lion, 1st Class with Swords, 1878; Commander 1st Class with Oak Leaves, 1893 (Baden)
- Knight of the Military Merit Order, 2nd Class (Bavaria)
- Knight of the Military Order of St. Henry, 15 September 1915 (Saxony)

Foreign honours

- Commander of the Imperial Order of Leopold, 1889 (Austria-Hungary)
- Commander of the Order of Saints Maurice and Lazarus (Italy)
- Order of the Rising Sun, 3rd Class (Japan)
- Knight of the Order of St. Anna, 2nd Class in Diamonds (Russia)
- Commander of the Order of the Sword, 2nd Class, 31 August 1888 (Sweden-Norway)

Military offices
Preceded by New Formation	Commander, Ersatz Corps; 18 August – 18 September 1914	Succeeded by Upgraded to Armee-Abteilung Falkenhausen
Preceded by From Ersatz corps	Commander, Armee-Abteilung Falkenhausen; 17 September 1914 – 17 April 1916	Succeeded by General der Infanterie Karl d'Elsa
Preceded by New Formation	Commander, High Command of Coastal Defence; 15 April – 29 August 1916	Succeeded by Generaloberst Josias von Heeringen
Preceded by Generalfeldmarschall Rupprecht, Crown Prince of Bavaria	Commander, 6th Army; 28 August 1916 – 23 April 1917	Succeeded by General der Infanterie Otto von Below
