= Mobile Barracks of High Command =

Chinese government regional office on behalf of a military commander

In the Republic of China between 1912 and 1949, a Mobile Barracks of High Command (Chinese: 行轅; pinyin: Xíngyuán) was a government regional special office opened on behalf of the military supreme commander in a particular region, where there was a high-ranking government or military official as the regional representative of the supreme commander in chief. The term was in use since the time of ancient China.

Generally speaking, a Mobile Barracks of High Command would have the operational authority over the affairs of military, civilians, and Nationalist Party within its area of responsibility, if it was military-related. For example, He Yingqin, a four-star army general of ROC, was once the director of Mobile Barracks of High Command at Chongqing. His official title was, in fact, "Director of Mobile Barracks of the Chairman of the National Government Office at Chongqing." Simply put: He spoke for the Chairman of the National Government of Republic of China in the great area of Chongqing. He was, de facto and de juro, the military governor over several provinces west of Sichuan (included).

Hence, the director of Mobile Barracks of High Command functioned as a provincial governor in the Qing Dynasty. In wartime, due to military considerations, the Director of Mobile Barracks would take over the administrative power of civil affairs and therefore also known as military general governor. Similarly, there were other Mobile Barracks of High Command at northeast China, Xifeng, Xichang, Guangzhou, and so on. Equivalently, another kind of regional special office, "Forward Command Camp of the Chief of the National Military Council" would be in charge of the operational planning and command functions in its administrative district.
