= High Command of Coastal Defence =

High Command of Coastal Defence Küstenverteidigung
- Flag of the Staff of an Armee Oberkommando (1871–1918)
- Active: 15 April 1916 – 1 November 1918
- Country: German Empire
- Type: Army
- Engagements: World War I

High Command of Coastal Defence (German: Küstenverteidigung) was an army level command of the German Army in World War I. It served in Germany throughout its existence.

== History ==
The High Command of Coastal Defence was set up on 14 April 1916, with headquarters in Hamburg, to guard against the possibility of an attack on the German coast (North Sea or Baltic Sea) or mainland Denmark. It was to maintain the coastal defences in a state of readiness and to assemble a defensive army if needed. It took command of all Deputy Corps Commanders bordering the sea (I Corps District, II Corps District, IX Corps District, X Corps District) and XVII Corps District. From September 1916, it also commanded those bordering the Netherlands (VII Corps District and VIII Corps District). On 18 September 1918, the post of Supreme Commander was discontinued; on 1 November 1918, the High Command was taken off active status and was dissolved on 24 January 1919.

== Commanders ==
High Command of Coastal Defence had the following commanders during its existence:

High Command of Coastal Defence
From	Commander	Previously	Subsequently,
15 April 1916	Generaloberst Ludwig von Falkenhausen	Armee-Abteilung Falkenhausen	6th Army
29 August 1916	Generaloberst Josias von Heeringen	7th Army	
19 September 1918	No commander		

== Glossary ==
- Armee-Abteilung or Army Detachment in the sense of "something detached from an Army". It is not under the command of an Army so is in itself a small Army.
- Armee-Gruppe A group within an Army and under its command, generally formed as a temporary measure for a specific task.
- Heeresgruppe or Army Group in the sense of a number of armies under a single commander.

== Bibliography ==
- Cron, Hermann (2002). Imperial German Army 1914–18: Organisation, Structure, Orders-of-Battle [first published: 1937]. Helion & Co. ISBN 1-874622-70-1.
