= 10th Ersatz Division =

10th Ersatz Division (10. Ersatz-Division)
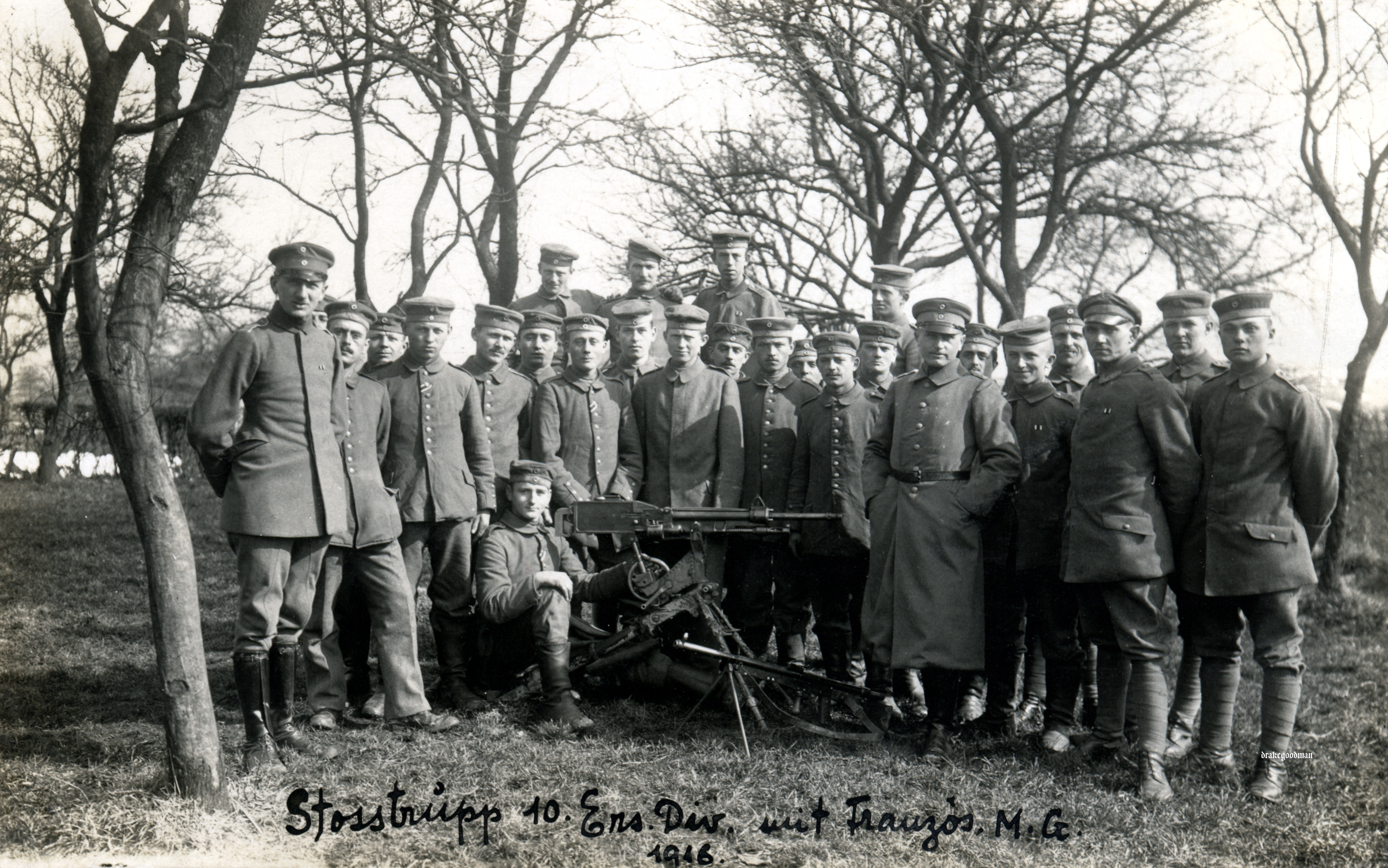
- The 10th Ersatz Division in 1916
- Active: 1914 – 1918
- Country: German Empire
- Branch: Army
- Type: Infantry
- Size: Approx. 15,000
- Engagements: World War I: Battle of the Frontiers; Battle of the Somme; Second Battle of the Aisne; Passchendaele; Battle of the Lys; Battle of Cambrai (1918)

The 10th Ersatz Division (10. Ersatz-Division) was a unit of the German Army in World War I. The division was formed on the mobilization of the German Army in August 1914. The division was disbanded in 1919 during the demobilization of the German Army after World War I.

== Formation and recruitment ==
The 10th Ersatz Division was formed on mobilization from 12 brigade replacement battalions (Brigade-Ersatz-Bataillone). Each brigade replacement battalion was numbered after its parent infantry brigade, and was formed with two companies taken from the replacement battalion of each of the brigade's two infantry regiments. Thus, collectively, the 12 brigade replacement battalions represented troop contributions from 24 different infantry regiments. The division represented a broad cross-section of the German Empire. The units of the 25th Mixed Ersatz Brigade were from the VII Army Corps area, which included the Prussian Province of Westphalia, the Lower Rhine portion of the Prussian Rhine Province, the Principality of Lippe, and the Principality of Schaumburg-Lippe. The units of the 37th Mixed Ersatz Brigade were from the X Army Corps area, which included most of the Prussian Province of Hanover, the Grand Duchy of Oldenburg, and the Duchy of Brunswick. The units of the 43rd Mixed Ersatz Brigade were from the XI Army Corps area, which included the Hesse-Kassel (or Hesse-Cassel) portion of the Prussian Province of Hesse-Nassau, the Grand Duchy of Saxe-Weimar-Eisenach, the Duchies of Saxe-Coburg-Gotha and Saxe-Meiningen, the Principalities of Reuss Elder Line, Reuss Younger Line, Schwarzburg-Rudolstadt, Schwarzburg-Sondershausen, and Waldeck, and portions of the Prussian Province of Saxony, including the region around Erfurt.

== Combat chronicle ==
The 10th Ersatz Division initially fought on the Western Front in World War I. It fought in the Battle of the Frontiers, seeing action in Lorraine and against the French defensive line from Nancy to Epinal. From December 1914 to February 1916, the division occupied the trenchlines in the Woëvre region. The division fought in the Battle of the Somme in September 1916. After a period in the trenchlines in the Champagne and near Verdun, the division saw action in 1917 in the Second Battle of the Aisne, also called the Third Battle of Champagne, and in the Battle of Passchendaele. In October 1917, the division was transferred to the Eastern Front, fighting in eastern Galicia until the armistice on that front. In January/February 1918, the division was in army reserve and was transferred back to the Western Front. It was in the trenchlines in Flanders and the Artois until April 1918, when it fought in the Battle of Armentières, part of the Battle of the Lys, also known as the German Lys Offensive or the Fourth Battle of Ypres. The division remained in the Flanders/Artois region after the German offensives and faced the various Allied counteroffensives, seeing action in the late-1918 Battle of Cambrai. It ended the war fighting in the Battle of Valenciennes and in the German retreat to its Antwerp-Meuse position. Allied intelligence rated the division as third class and of moderate value.

== Order of battle on mobilization ==
The order of battle of the 10th Ersatz Division on mobilization was as follows:

- 25.gemischte Ersatz-Brigade
  - Brigade-Ersatz-Bataillon Nr. 25
  - Brigade-Ersatz-Bataillon Nr. 26
  - Brigade-Ersatz-Bataillon Nr. 27
  - Brigade-Ersatz-Bataillon Nr. 28
  - Kavallerie-Ersatz-Abteilung/VII. Armeekorps
  - Feldartillerie-Ersatz-Abteilung Nr. 43 (Ersatz-Abteilung/Feldartillerie-Regiment Nr. 43)
- 37.gemischte Ersatz-Brigade
  - Brigade-Ersatz-Bataillon Nr. 37
  - Brigade-Ersatz-Bataillon Nr. 38
  - Brigade-Ersatz-Bataillon Nr. 39
  - Brigade-Ersatz-Bataillon Nr. 40
  - Kavallerie-Ersatz-Abteilung/X. Armeekorps
  - Feldartillerie-Ersatz-Abteilung Nr. 42 (Ersatz-Abteilung/Feldartillerie-Regiment Nr. 42)
  - Feldartillerie-Ersatz-Abteilung Nr. 62 (Ersatz-Abteilung/Feldartillerie-Regiment Nr. 62)
  - 1.Ersatz-Kompanie/Pionier-Bataillon Nr. 10
- 43.gemischte Ersatz-Brigade
  - Brigade-Ersatz-Bataillon Nr. 43
  - Brigade-Ersatz-Bataillon Nr. 44
  - Brigade-Ersatz-Bataillon Nr. 76
  - Brigade-Ersatz-Bataillon Nr. 83
  - Kavallerie-Ersatz-Abteilung/XI. Armeekorps
  - Feldartillerie-Ersatz-Abteilung Nr. 47 (Ersatz-Abteilung/Feldartillerie-Regiment Nr. 47)
  - Feldartillerie-Ersatz-Abteilung Nr. 55 (Ersatz-Abteilung/Feldartillerie-Regiment Nr. 55)
  - 3.Ersatz-Kompanie/Pionier-Bataillon Nr. 11

== Order of battle on February 20, 1918 ==
The division underwent several structural changes as the war progressed. The mixed Ersatz brigades were converted to Ersatz infantry brigades as cavalry, artillery, and pioneer Ersatz units were grouped and reorganized. The brigade replacement battalions were grouped into infantry regiments. The 10th Ersatz Division was triangularized in October 1916. Cavalry was later reduced, pioneers were increased to a full battalion, and an artillery command and a divisional signals command were created. The division's order of battle on February 20, 1918, was as follows:

- 43.Ersatz-Infanterie-Brigade
  - Infanterie-Regiment Nr. 369
  - Infanterie-Regiment Nr. 370
  - Infanterie-Regiment Nr. 371
- 1.Eskadron/Regiment Königs-Jäger zu Pferde Nr. 1
- Artillerie-Kommandeur 136
  - Feldartillerie-Regiment Nr. 95
  - Fußartillerie-Bataillon Nr. 156
- Pionier-Bataillon Nr. 510
  - Pionier-Kompanie Nr. 246
  - Pionier-Kompanie Nr. 308
  - Minenwerfer-Kompanie Nr. 163
- Divisions-Nachrichten-Kommandeur 560

== Bibliography ==
- 10. Ersatz-Division (Chronik 1914/1918) - Der erste Weltkrieg
- Hermann Cron et al., Ruhmeshalle unserer alten Armee (Berlin, 1935)
- Hermann Cron, Geschichte des deutschen Heeres im Weltkriege 1914-1918 (Berlin, 1937)
- Günter Wegner, Stellenbesetzung der deutschen Heere 1815-1939. (Biblio Verlag, Osnabrück, 1993), Bd. 1
- Histories of Two Hundred and Fifty-One Divisions of the German Army Which Participated in the War (1914-1918). Document (United States. War Department) No. 905. Washington, D.C.: Government Printing Office. 1920. OCLC 1387464.
