= 8th Ersatz Division =

8th Ersatz Division (8. Ersatz-Division)
- Active: 1914-1917
- Country: Prussia/Württemberg/Germany
- Branch: Army
- Type: Infantry
- Size: Approx. 15,000
- Engagements: World War I: Battle of the Frontiers, Somme (1916)

The 8th Ersatz Division (8. Ersatz-Division) was a unit of the German Army in World War I. The division was formed on mobilization of the German Army in August 1914. The division was a composite division, formed from 14 brigade replacement battalions (Brigade-Ersatz-Bataillone) from the Kingdom of Württemberg, the Grand Duchy of Hesse, the Rhine Province, the Province of Hesse-Nassau and the Imperial Territory of Alsace-Lorraine. It became more Württemberg as the war progressed; and, in February 1917, it was officially designated a Royal Württemberg division. It was redesignated the 243rd Infantry Division in April 1917.

== Formation ==
The division was formed on mobilization with 14 brigade replacement battalions. Each brigade replacement battalion was numbered after its parent infantry brigade, and was formed with two companies taken from the replacement battalion of each of the brigade's two infantry regiments. In two cases, a brigade replacement battalion drew from three regiments. Thus, collectively, the 12 brigade replacement battalions represented troop contributions from 30 different infantry regiments. Four brigade replacement battalions were from the Kingdom of Württemberg; two were from the Grand Duchy of Hesse; four were from the Prussian Rhine Province; two were from the Prussian Province of Hesse-Nassau (one with troops from the former Duchy of Nassau, the other from the former Electorate of Hesse); and two from the Imperial Territory of Alsace-Lorraine. The infantry units were augmented with cavalry, artillery and combat engineers, also drawn from Ersatz formations.

== Combat chronicle ==
The division initially fought in the Battle of the Frontiers in 1914, including the battle before Nancy-Epinal. From September 1914 to October 1916, it was in the trenchlines and fought in the region between the Meuse and Moselle Rivers, especially in an area known as the Priest's Forest (German: Priesterwald, French: Bois Le Prêtre). In October 1916, it entered the Battle of the Somme. Afterwards, it returned to the Priesterwald, where it was converted into the 243rd Infantry Division. Allied intelligence rated the division's elements as good.

== Order of battle on mobilization ==
The order of battle of the 8th Ersatz Division on mobilization was as follows:

- 29. gemischte Ersatz-Brigade
  - Brigade-Ersatz-Bataillon Nr. 29
  - Brigade-Ersatz-Bataillon Nr. 30
  - Brigade-Ersatz-Bataillon Nr. 31
  - Brigade-Ersatz-Bataillon Nr. 32
  - Brigade-Ersatz-Bataillon Nr. 80
  - Brigade-Ersatz-Bataillon Nr. 86
  - Kavallerie-Ersatz-Abteilung Nr. 29
  - Feldartillerie-Ersatz-Abteilung Nr. 23
  - Feldartillerie-Ersatz-Abteilung Nr. 44
- 51. (kgl. württemb.) gemischte Ersatz-Brigade
  - Brigade-Ersatz-Bataillon Nr. 51
  - Brigade-Ersatz-Bataillon Nr. 52
  - Brigade-Ersatz-Bataillon Nr. 53
  - Brigade-Ersatz-Bataillon Nr. 54
  - Kavallerie-Ersatz-Abteilung Nr. 51
  - Feldartillerie-Ersatz-Abteilung Nr. 29
  - Feldartillerie-Ersatz-Abteilung Nr. 65
- 41. gemischte Ersatz-Brigade
  - Brigade-Ersatz-Bataillon Nr. 41
  - Brigade-Ersatz-Bataillon Nr. 42
  - Brigade-Ersatz-Bataillon Nr. 49
  - Brigade-Ersatz-Bataillon Nr. 50
  - Kavallerie-Ersatz-Abteilung Nr. 41
  - Feldartillerie-Ersatz-Abteilung Nr. 25
  - Feldartillerie-Ersatz-Abteilung Nr. 27
  - 1. Ersatz-Kompanie/Pionier-Bataillon Nr. 21

== Order of battle on February 2, 1917 ==
Divisions underwent many changes during the war, with regiments moving from division to division, and some being destroyed and rebuilt. The 8th Ersatz Division was reorganized and triangularized in July 1915, losing its two non-Württemberg Ersatz brigades. The brigade replacement battalions were consolidated and converted into infantry regiments. Over the course of the war, units were exchanged with other divisions, cavalry was reduced, engineers increased, and an artillery command and a divisional signals command were created. The 8th Ersatz Division's order of battle on February 2, 1917, when it was officially named a Royal Württemberg division and shortly before being renamed the 243rd Infantry Division, was as follows:

- 51. Ersatz-Infanterie-Brigade
  - Kgl. Württembergisches Ersatz-Infanterie-Regiment Nr. 51
  - Kgl. Württembergisches Ersatz-Infanterie-Regiment Nr. 52
  - Füsilier-Regiment Kaiser Franz Josef von Österreich, König von Ungarn (4. Württembergisches) Nr. 122
- 3. Eskadron/Ulanen-Regiment König Karl (1. Württembergisches) Nr. 19
- Artillerie-Kommandeur 135
  - Kgl. Württembergisches Ersatz-Feldartillerie-Regiment Nr. 65
  - Feldartillerie-Regiment Nr. 92
- Stab Pionier-Bataillon Nr. 508
  - Pionier-Kompanie Nr. 253
  - Pionier-Kompanie Nr. 306
  - Minenwerfer-Kompanie Nr. 162
