= Guard Ersatz Division (German Empire) =

Guard Ersatz Division (Garde-Ersatz-Division)
- Active: 1914-1919
- Country: Germany
- Branch: Army
- Type: Infantry
- Size: Approx. 15,000
- Engagements: World War I: Frontiers, Race to the Sea, Verdun

Commanders
- Notable commanders: Maximilian von Poseck

The Guard Ersatz Division (Garde-Ersatz-Division) was a division of the Imperial German Army during World War I. Ersatz is German for "replacement"; the division was formed from companies of the replacement battalions (Ersatz-Bataillone) of the regiments of Prussian Guards and several other Prussian regiments. The division was formed on the mobilization of the German Army in August 1914.

The Guard Ersatz Division fought in the opening phases of the war in the Battle of the Frontiers and then participated in the Race to the Sea. In 1916, the division fought in the Battle of Verdun. In 1917, the division participated in the Second Battle of the Aisne. In July 1917, the division was sent to the Eastern Front, where it fought in the Baltic region. It returned to the Western Front in September, entering the line in October near Verdun. The division remained on the Western Front until the Armistice on November 11, 1918.

== Order of battle on mobilization ==
- 1. gemischte Garde-Ersatz-Brigade:
  - Garde-Brigade-Ersatz-Bataillon Nr. 1
  - Garde-Brigade-Ersatz-Bataillon Nr. 2
  - Garde-Brigade-Ersatz-Bataillon Nr. 3
  - Garde-Brigade-Ersatz-Bataillon Nr. 4
  - Garde-Brigade-Ersatz-Bataillon Nr. 5
  - Garde-Brigade-Ersatz-Bataillon Nr. 6
  - Garde-Kavallerie-Ersatz-Abteilung Berlin (later Garde-Kavallerie-Eskadron Nr. 1)
  - 1. Garde-Feldartillerie-Ersatz-Abteilung
  - 2. Garde-Feldartillerie-Ersatz-Abteilung
  - 1. Ersatz-Kompanie/Garde-Pionier-Bataillon
- 5. gemischte Ersatz-Brigade:
  - Brigade-Ersatz-Bataillon Nr. 5
  - Brigade-Ersatz-Bataillon Nr. 6
  - Brigade-Ersatz-Bataillon Nr. 7
  - Brigade-Ersatz-Bataillon Nr. 8
  - Kavallerie-Ersatz-Abteilung Pasewalk (II. Armeekorps)
  - Vorpommersches Feldartillerie-Ersatz-Abteilung Nr. 38
  - Hinterpommersches Feldartillerie-Ersatz-Abteilung Nr. 53
  - 1.Ersatz-Kompanie/Pionier-Bataillon Nr. 2
- 17. gemischte Ersatz-Brigade:
  - Brigade-Ersatz-Bataillon Nr. 17
  - Brigade-Ersatz-Bataillon Nr. 18
  - Brigade-Ersatz-Bataillon Nr. 19
  - Brigade-Ersatz-Bataillon Nr. 20
  - Kavallerie-Ersatz-Abteilung Posen (V. Armeekorps)
  - Posensches Feldartillerie-Ersatz-Abteilung Nr. 20
  - Niederschlesisches Feldartillerie-Ersatz-Abteilung Nr. 41

It is possible that 17. gemischte Ersatz-Brigade remained in the east and was assigned to 3. Landwehr-Division - the sources are in conflict. By 26 August, it was with the Landwehr Division.

== Order of battle on March 8, 1918 ==
- Garde-Ersatz-Brigade:
  - 6. Garde-Regiment
  - 7. Garde-Regiment
  - Infanterie-Regiment Nr. 399
  - MG-Scharfschützen-Abteilung Nr. 29
- 5. Eskadron/2.Garde-Ulanen-Regiment
- Garde-Artillerie-Kommandeur 6:
  - 7. Garde-Feldartillerie-Regiment
  - Fußartillerie-Bataillon Nr. 89
- Stab Pionier-Bataillon Nr. 501:
  - Garde-Pionier-Kompanie Nr. 301
  - Pionier-Kompanie Nr. 302
  - 7. Garde-Minenwerfer-Kompanie
- Garde-Divisions-Nachrichten-Kommandeur 551
