= 39th Bavarian Reserve Division =

39th Bavarian Reserve Division (39. Bayerische Reserve-Division)
- Active: 1914–19
- Country: Bavaria, German Empire
- Branch: Army
- Type: Infantry
- Size: Approx. 12,500
- Engagements: World War I

The 39th Royal Bavarian Reserve Division (39. Kgl. Bayerische Reserve-Division) was a reserve infantry division of the Imperial German Army in World War I. It was raised to division status on October 2, 1914, from an ad hoc unit, "Brigade von Rekowski", and named "Division von Rekowski" ("Rekowski's Division"). On December 8, 1914, it was renamed the 39th Reserve Division. As it was heavily made up of Bavarian units, on December 26, 1916, it was again renamed, this time as the 39th Royal Bavarian Reserve Division. It spent the war engaged in positional warfare in the Alsace-Lorraine region. It was dissolved in 1919 during the demobilization of the German Army after the Armistice.

Order of Battle on November 20, 1914 (Division von Rekowski):

- 1. bayerische Ersatz-Brigade:
  - Kgl. Bayerisches Ersatz-Infanterie-Regiment Nr. 1
  - Kgl. Bayerisches Ersatz-Infanterie-Regiment Nr. 3
- 9. bayerische Ersatz-Infanterie-Brigade:
  - Landwehr-Infanterie-Regiment Nr. 80
  - Landwehr-Infanterie-Regiment Nr. 81
- 3.Eskadron/Reserve-Husaren-Regiment Nr. 9
- Kgl. Bayerische Feldartillerie-Ersatz-Abteilung Nr. 10
- 2.Batterie/Kgl. Bayerisches Feldartillerie-Ersatz-Abteilung Nr. 4
- 1.Batterie/Kgl. Bayerisches Feldartillerie-Ersatz-Abteilung Nr. 8
- 2.Ersatz-Kompanie/Kgl. Bayerisches 1. Pionier-Bataillon
- 1.Ersatz-Kompanie/Kgl. Bayerisches 3. Pionier-Bataillon

Order of Battle on February 20, 1918:

- Kgl. Bayerische 1. Ersatz-Brigade:
  - Kgl. Bayerisches 1. Ersatz-Regiment
  - Kgl. Bayerisches 2. Ersatz-Regiment
  - Kgl. Bayerisches 5. Ersatz-Regiment
- 1.Eskadron/Kgl. Bayerisches 2. Chevaulegers-Regiment
- Kgl. Bayerischer Artillerie-Kommandeur 21:
  - Kgl. Bayerisches 10. Reserve-Feldartillerie-Regiment
- Stab Kgl. Bayerisches Pionier-Bataillon Nr. 23:
  - Kgl. Bayerische 21. Reserve-Pionier-Kompanie
  - Kgl. Bayerische 239. Minenwerfer-Kompanie
  - Kgl. Bayerischer 439. Divisions-Nachrichten-Kommandeur
