= 30th Bavarian Reserve Division =

30th Bavarian Reserve Division (30. Bayerische Reserve-Division)
- Active: 1914-1918
- Country: Bavaria/Germany
- Branch: Army
- Type: Infantry
- Size: Approx. 12,500
- Engagements: World War I

The 30th Royal Bavarian Reserve Division (30. Kgl. Bayerische Reserve-Division) was a reserve infantry division of the Imperial German Army in World War I. It was initially the Main Reserve, Fortress Strasbourg (Hauptreserve/Festung Straßburg) and was designated the 30th Reserve Division (30. Reserve-Division) from mobilization in August 1914. It was almost entirely made up of Bavarian units and thus, on December 26, 1916, it was renamed the 30th Royal Bavarian Reserve Division. It spent the war engaged in positional warfare in the Vosges mountains of France and the Alsace-Lorraine region.

On mobilization, the division comprised three brigades: the non-Bavarian 60. Reserve-Infanterie-Brigade (Reserve-Infanterie-Regiment Nr. 60, 99), 3. bayerische Reserve-Infanterie-Brigade (4. und 15. bayerisches Reserve-Infanterie-Regimenten) and 10. bayerische Reserve-Infanterie-Brigade, together with divisional cavalry, artillery and pioneer components. On August 17, 5. bayerische Ersatz-Brigade transferred into the division from the Bavarian Ersatz Division. By the end of August, 60. Reserve-Infanterie-Brigade had been broken up and its constituent regiments had left the division.

Order of Battle on August 18, 1914:

- 10. bayerische Reserve-Infanterie-Brigade
  - Kgl. Bayerisches 11. Reserve-Infanterie-Regiment
  - Kgl. Bayerisches 14. Reserve-Infanterie-Regiment
  - Festungs-MG-Kompanie Nr. 2
  - Reserve-MG-Abteilung Nr. 3
- 5. bayerische Ersatz-Brigade
  - Bayerisches Brigade-Ersatz-Bataillon Nr. 5 (mob.Ers.Btl./Kgl. Bay. 23.Inf.Regt.)
  - Bayerisches Brigade-Ersatz-Bataillon Nr. 6 (mob.Ers.Btl./Kgl. Bay. 18.Inf.Regt. Prinz Ludwig Ferdinand)
  - Bayerisches Brigade-Ersatz-Bataillon Nr. 7 (mob.Ers.Btl./Kgl. Bay. 5.Inf.Regt. Großherzog Ernst Ludwig von Hessen)
  - Bayerisches Brigade-Ersatz-Bataillon Nr. 8 (mob.Ers.Btl./Kgl. Bay. 8.Inf.Regt. Großherzog Friedrich II. von Baden)
- Kavallerie-Ersatz-Abteilung Landau/II. Bayerisches Armeekorps (1/3 Eskadron)
- Kgl. Bayerisches 2. Feldartillerie-Regiment
- 1. Ersatz-Batterie/Kgl. Bayerisches 12. Feldartillerie-Regiment
- Ersatz-Abteilung/Feldartillerie-Regiment Nr. 80
- 1.Ersatz-Batterie/Feldartillerie-Regiment Nr. 84
- 3.Batterie/Reserve-Feldartillerie-Regiment Nr. 14

Order of Battle on January 1, 1918:

- 5. Kgl. Bayerische Ersatz-Brigade
  - Kgl. Bayerisches 4. Ersatz-Regiment
  - Kgl. Bayerisches 8. Landwehr-Infanterie-Regiment
  - Kgl. Bayerisches 15. Landwehr-Infanterie-Regiment
- 2.Eskadron/Reserve-Husaren-Regiment Nr. 9
- Kgl. Bayerischer Artillerie-Kommandeur 20:
  - Reserve-Feldartillerie-Regiment Nr. 239
- Stab Kgl. Bayerisches 22. Pionier-Bataillon:
  - Kgl. Bayerische 13. Reserve-Pionier-Kompanie
  - Kgl. Bayerische 5. Landwehr-Pionier-Kompanie
  - Minenwerfer-Kompanie Nr. 230
- Kgl. Bayerischer Divisions-Nachrichten-Kommandeur 430
