= Vistula–Bug offensive =

1915 German offensive on the Eastern Front of World War I

Vistula-Bug offensive
- Part of the Eastern Front of World War I
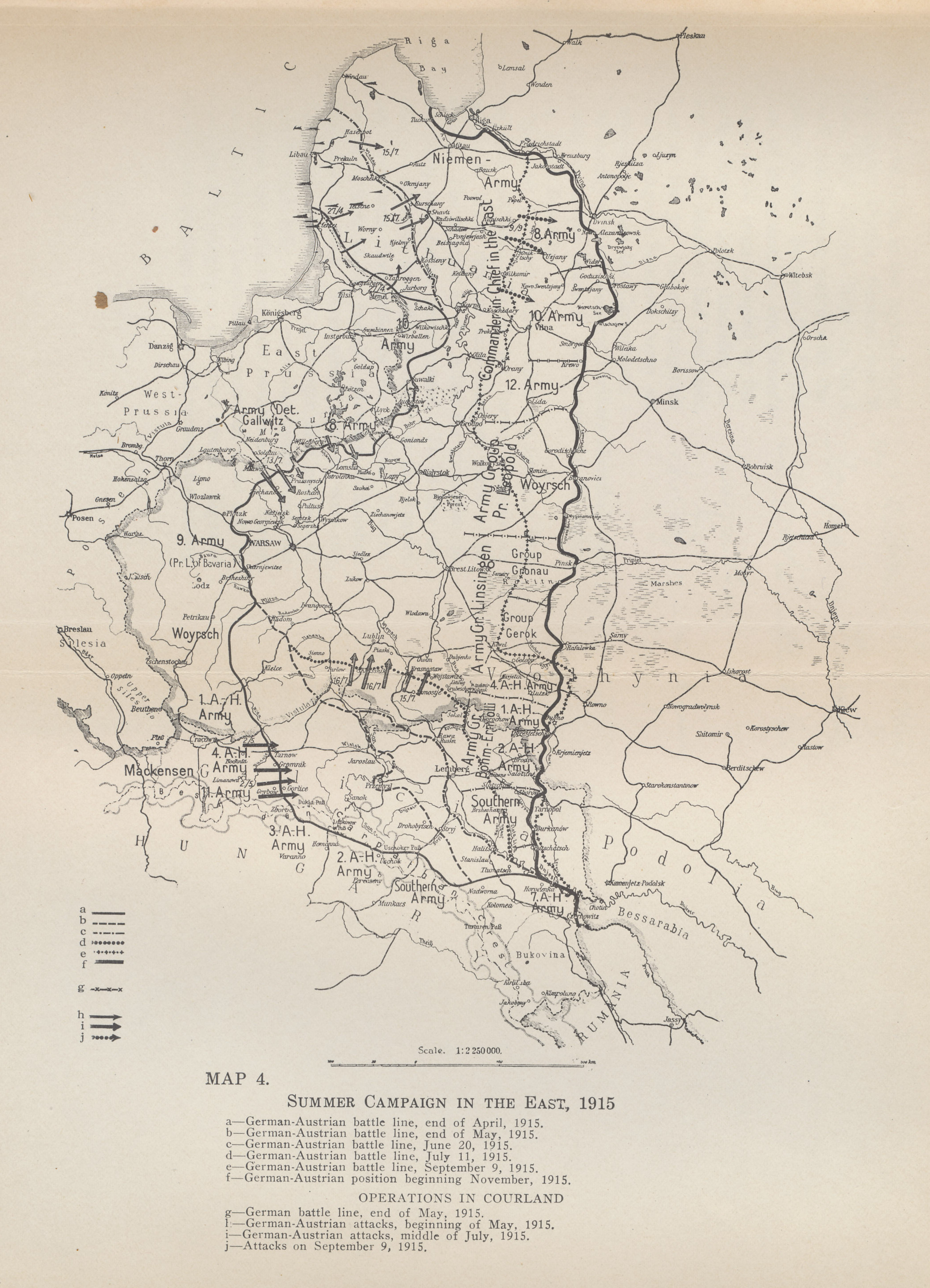
- German summer offensive in the Eastern Front 1915
Date	14 July – 28 August 1915
Location	Bug and Vistula area, (present-day Poland)
Result	Central Powers’ victory: part of Great Retreat

Belligerents
Germany; Austria-Hungary	Russian Empire

Commanders and leaders
(German Empire) A. von Mackensen (German Empire) A. von Linsingen (German Empire) Remus von Woyrsch	Mikhail Alekseyev; Nikolai Ivanov; Leonid Lesh

Units involved
(German Empire) 11th Army (German Empire) 4th Army (German Empire) Army of the Bug (Austria-Hungary) 1st Army (Austria-Hungary) 2nd Army (Austria-Hungary) 4th Army	3rd Army; 4th Army; 8th Army; 13th Army

Strength
On 28 July 1915; Total: 1,193,768 men 2,475 guns 1,490 machine guns	On 28 July 1915; Total: 1,078,897 men 2,933 guns 1,496 machine guns

Casualties and losses
Total: 185,535 men German Empire: Total 93,474 men 24,984 KIA; 63,699 WIA; 4,791 MIA; Austria-Hungary: Total 92,061 men 12,474 KIA; 55,521 WIA; 24,006 MIA	Total 379,101 men 39,654 KIA; 155,413 WIA; 184,034 MIA

The Vistula–Bug offensive from July 13 to August 28, 1915, was a major Central Powers offensive with the decisive role of the German Imperial Army during World War I on the Eastern Front to defeat the forces of the Russian army in South Poland and Galicia.

== Background ==
The German General Staff and the Austro-Hungarian Army High Command paid great attention to the actions of the Army Group of Field Marshal A. von Mackensen, which was to play the role of the southern blade of the “scissors” that cut off the Russian armies from the escape routes to Brest-Litovsk. On July 11, A. von Mackensen received a directive to go on the offensive from July 15–16, first with the forces of the Army of the Bug, and then with the 11th and 4th Armies. The main blow was delivered on both banks of the Wieprz River to capture Russian positions on the Wolica and Voislavka rivers. To the right, the Army of the Bug advanced on the Hill, to the left, the Austro-Hungarian 4th Army, to Lublin. The operation was supported by active actions: from the left flank - by the army of Colonel-General Remus von Woyrsch against Russian positions from Pilica to the Vistula, from the right flank - by crossing the Bug and advancing to Vladimir-Volynsky of the Austro-Hungarian 1st Army.

The task of the 4th, 3rd and 13th Armies on the left flank of the Northwestern Front was to prevent the breakthrough of the Central Powers to Brest-Litovsk and ensure the evacuation of Warsaw. The left flank of the 13th Army on the Bug River is provided by the 8th Army of the Southwestern Front (Russian Empire). The right flank of the 4th Army on the western bank of the Vistula was supported by the 2nd Army, which was defending the approaches to Warsaw. By the directive of the Stavka of July 5, it was precisely the southern front of the armies of the North-Western Front that was considered as the arena of the main and decisive blow of the German and Austro-Hungarian troops. However, the events on the Narew River in July 1915 shook this confidence.

The armies of A. von Mackensen did not have such a rich supply of shells as the army group of Max von Gallwitz, but they could provide both the conduct of defensive operations and try to break through fortified positions. By the beginning of July, the Russian armies from the Vistula to the Bug were supplied with ammunition to a degree that made it possible to conduct defensive and offensive battles for a short time.

== Battle ==
On July 13, the German Army of the Bug of General of Infantry Alexander von Linsingen captured Starogród in the sector of the Russian 4th Cavalry Corps and pushed back the 2nd Caucasian Army Corps. On July 15, the German armies began to approach the Russian positions, and Linsingen struck the Beskids, XXIV Reserve and XXXXI Reserve Corps against the Russian troops of the 13th Army, Infantry General V. Gorbatovsky. The Germans captured a well-fortified position, but the Russian 2nd Caucasian, 29th and 31st Army Corps organised defences on the main fortified line.

On July 16, the German 11th Army attacked the positions of the Russian 3rd Army west of the Wieprz River with a shock group from the Guards, X Corps and XXII Reserve Corps. The 9th, 10th, 3rd Caucasian and partly the 14th Army Corps were pushed back. But despite the capture of 6,000 Russian prisoners and the introduction of reserves (1st Cavalry and 119th Infantry Divisions) into battle, the Germans failed to break through the main defensive zone. At the same time, the Austro-Hungarian 1st Army went on the offensive against the junction of the Russian 13th and 8th Armies. On July 14, the Austro-Hungarian troops completely captured the western bank of the Bug River near Krystynopol, and on the night of July 16 they crossed the river north of Sokal. In the evening, the 2nd Siberian Army Corps arrived in the Russian 3rd Army. On July 17, he was thrown into counterattacks in order to restore the situation, but by the end of the day it was only possible, together with the 10th Army Corps, to gain a foothold in the forest near the Orchowiec village. The pressure of the German strike group on the 3rd Caucasus Army Corps managed to create a bridgehead on the eastern bank of the Wieprz River and create a threat to the flank and rear of the Russian troops. As a result, in front of the Austro-Hungarian 4th Army, Russian troops began to retreat. In the evening, two guards regiments arrived in Krasnostav, but soon the city was captured by the German Guards Corps. Both flanking armies of Army Group's Mackensen failed to move forward.

On July 18, the Austro-Hungarian I and II Corps crossed the Bug River in the sector of the 8th Army of the Southwestern Front. The Russian 12th Infantry Division was outflanked and pushed back. A gap formed between the 19th and 60th Infantry Divisions; Aleksei Brusilov sent the 14th Infantry and 11th Cavalry Divisions there. The centre and the right flank of the army from 7 am went on the offensive against the Bug army and partially recaptured the lost trenches. However, events in the neighbouring 3rd Army forced V. Gorbatovsky at midnight on July 9 to order the withdrawal of the right flank and centre of the 13th Army.

In the 3rd Army on the morning of July 18, the commander of the 2nd Siberian Corps Radko Dimitriev, under pressure from the Germans, unexpectedly withdrew troops, which also caused the withdrawal of the 9th Army Corps and the 3rd Caucasian Corps. The Austro-Hungarian VI Corps broke through the Russian positions and took 3,500 prisoners, but suffered significant losses (almost 7,000 men). Meanwhile, the Russian Guards Corps, the last reserve of the front on the southern flank, was advanced towards the Germans. The Germans were stopped, but L. Lesh doubted the possibility of holding an unfortified, accidentally occupied line. In the evening, the Germans resumed the offensive, broke through the orders of the 21st Infantry Division, forced the 14th Army and Guards Corps to retreat. The Izmailovsky Life Guards Regiment was almost destroyed. At night, the defence of the 9th Army Corps was broken through. M. Alekseyev was forced to allow the 3rd Army to withdraw further.

The breakthrough was 32 km along the front and 12 km in depth, the Germans from the beginning of the operation captured 16,250 prisoners and 23 machine guns. Using the success of their neighbors, the Austro-Hungarian 4th Army pushed back the Russian 4th Army. On July 17, the army of Remus von Woyrsch delivered a blow to the Grenadier Corps of the 4th Army with the Landwehr Corps. The breakthrough reached 10 km along the front and 6 km in depth. On July 18, the Grenadier Corps tried to counterattack, but was driven back, losing only 2,000 prisoners.

The withdrawal of the 4th Army as a whole went without interference from the German army. On the afternoon of July 19, at the request of M. Alekseyev, the Supreme Commander, Grand Duke Nikolai Nikolayevich, arrived in Siedlce, where, having familiarised himself with the situation, he allowed the Chief of Staff of the North-Western Front to independently order the withdrawal of armies, if necessary, from the line of the Vistula River to the east, including evacuate Warsaw. In the evening, the 4th, 3rd and 13th Armies resumed their withdrawal, interrupting the fighting, regardless of their success. The complaint of the commander of the Guards Corps, General of the Cavalry V. Bezobrazov, about the actions of the commander of the 3rd Army, Leonid Lesh, who did not allow him to go on the offensive, was left without attention by M. Alekseyev.

Von Mackensen's Army Group pursued the retreating. After the arrival of the 13th and 14th Infantry Divisions, Brusilov ordered to go on the offensive and take the right bank of the Bug River. Throughout the day of July 20, a stubborn battle went on in the sector of the 8th Army, many points and trenches passed from hand to hand. The 12th and 28th Army Corps managed to capture the first line of trenches. But against the 8th Army Corps, the Austro-Hungarians launched an offensive, expanding the bridgehead across the Bug River, and in the evening threw back the 12th Infantry Division and cavalry. By the morning of July 21, the Russian 12th, 13th and 19th Infantry Divisions reached the banks of the Bug River near Lake Bely Stok, captured 27 officers and 1,466 soldiers, 2 machine guns, but could not recapture Sokal and suffered heavy losses. A. Brusilov noted the "extraordinary stubbornness of the enemy."

On July 20, the Army of the Bug attacked the left flank of the 13th Army, pushing the 2nd Caucasian Corps. Counterattacks were not successful. The 29th and 31st Army and 4th Cavalry Corps were driven back. Gorbatovsky will anxiously inform Alekseyev that there are no more prepared defensive positions in the rear of the 13th Army. The German 11th Army successfully repelled Russian counterattacks, but could not move forward. The Russian and German Guards Corps fought a stubborn battle north of Krasnostav, but to the right of the Guards the 2nd Siberian Army Corps was thrown back; on the morning of July 21, the 5th Siberian Rifle Division retreated. Only by noon counterattacks of the 9th Army Corps and the Guards Rifle Brigade managed to restore the situation. By evening, the Germans forced the 9th and 14th Army Corps to withdraw. The Austro-Hungarian 4th Army approached the Russian positions until noon on July 20 and fired at them. In the afternoon, in a stubborn battle, the IX and X Corps broke through the centre of the Russian 4th Army. The Russian 15th and 25th Army Corps lost 6,000 prisoners.

Evert and Lesh accused each other of untimely and too far withdrawal of troops. To return the lost positions from 5 o'clock on July 21, a detachment of Major General A. Veselovsky (three regiments of infantry) went on the offensive, he was supported by the combined brigades of the 6th and 8th Infantry Divisions. 400 Austro-Hungarian soldiers were taken prisoner, the Austro-Hungarian 24th Infantry Division was driven back to their original positions. The 37th Honvéd Infantry Division and the 47th Reserve Division, brought into battle, drove out the Russian 15th and 25th Army Corps from their position. The situation on the left bank of the Vistula was even more unfortunate. The 16th Army and Grenadier Corps retreated beyond the Vistula.

On July 22, Alekseyev was forced to issue a directive on the gradual withdrawal of the 3rd, 4th and 13th Armies to the previously prepared position of Ivangorod-Kovel. The 4th Army retreated under constant pressure from the Germans. The Austro-Hungarian VIII, IX and X Corps drove back the 15th and swept the 25th Army Corps. At the front of 23 km, 48 officers and 12,400 Russian soldiers, 23 machine guns were captured. A. Evert considered the positions near Lublin more advantageous for defence than the line along the Wieprz River, but he asked for the assistance of the 3rd Army to organise stubborn resistance.

On the site of the Russian 3rd Army, by the morning of July 22, the situation had strengthened: the Guards Corps was able to hold positions and captured 12 officers and 277 soldiers. Considering that the Germans was tired, suffered huge losses and was experiencing an acute shortage of ammunition (according to the testimony of the prisoners), L. Lesh ordered to go on the offensive with all his might. The remnants of the 10th Army Corps were in reserve. The Russian attack began on the night of 23 July. Mackensen decided to go on the defensive until July 29 in order to exhaust the Russian forces and grind their reserves. The offensive of the central corps of the 3rd Army at first developed successfully: 5 guns and 2 machine guns were captured, but from 5 o'clock the German Guards and XXII Reserve Corps launched a counterattack; they repulsed the guns and threw the Russian Guard back to their original position. At 4 p.m. on July 23, the order was given to withdraw the 3rd Army, although L. Lesh considered the situation strong. At the same time, a conflict broke out between Lesh and the commander of the Guards Corps, V. Bezobrazov. The latter accused the army commander of inept leadership.

The Bug army tried to capitalise on its success, but met with increased resistance from the troops of the 13th Army Gorbatovsky relieved by combining the efforts of the 56th and 51st Divisions to return the positions of the 2nd Caucasian Corps. The trenches at Putnowice Wielkie were recaptured, 160 prisoners, 6 guns and a machine gun from the Beskid Corps were captured. In the afternoon, the Germans launched a counterattack with the XXXXI and XXIV Reserve Corps. On the night of July 23, the Russian 13th Army began to withdraw to new positions. Stubborn fighting continued near Sokal on the front of the 8th Army. The Austro-Hungarian 2nd Army joined the battles on the Bug River. After the retreat of the 13th Army, F. Rerberg's corps was forced to leave the bend of the Bug River and return to their previous positions. By the morning of July 23, with strong counterattacks and dense artillery fire, the Austro-Hungarian 1st Army pushed the 12th and 28th Army Corps back to their original position. The 8th Army went on the defensive.

While the Landwehr Corps began preparations for forcing the Vistula above Ivangorod, fierce disputes were going on between Falkenhayn and Hötzendorf about the direction of the further offensive of the army of R. von Woyrsch. Falkenhayn insisted on an attack in the direction of Siedlce and Łuków, with its unification together with the 9th Army in the hands of the German command: the chief of staff of the AOK objected, considering it necessary to reinforce the flank of the 4th Army with this army and capture Ivangorod. The chief of staff of the Woyrsch army, Lieutenant Colonel Wilhelm Heye, considered the crossing at Nowa Aleksandria to be meaningless, since it would have met strong opposition from the Russians. On the night of July 25, when the first pontoons were already launched and reached the Russian coast under fire, the crossing was canceled by order of E. von Falkenhayn.

On the night of July 24, the Russian 3rd Army did not go on the offensive: the order of the commander was transferred to the corps too late. The Guards Corps was generally not able to advance without preparation. The attacks of the 24th Army Corps were repelled by the Germans by 1 a.m., and the 9th Army Corps withdrew to their previous positions. If the fighting subsided in the sectors of the 4th and 3rd Armies, then the 13th Army had to repel the onslaught of the Army of the Bug, especially at the junction of fronts. On July 23–24, attempts were made to go on the offensive with the forces of the 2nd Caucasian and 31st Army Corps, but the superiority of the enemy in heavy artillery led to the exhaustion of the forces of the Russian troops. However, on the night of July 25, the Beskid Corps attacked the trenches of the 5th Caucasian Corps, and the 24th Reserve Division of the 29th Army Corps. After a stubborn battle, the Russian divisions retreated to the north, but in the evening they launched counterattacks and partially recaptured their positions. At the same time, under the onslaught of the Beskid Corps, the 2nd Caucasian Corps retreated. After another conflict with L. Lesh, the commander of the Guards Corps V. Bezobrazov was "released for treatment."

During July 26, the 13th Army tried to turn the tide of the struggle on the outskirts of the Bug west of Volodymyr-Volynskyi. The onslaught of the Central Powers's troops continued on July 27–28, but was almost everywhere repulsed, only the 2nd and 5th Caucasian Corps were pushed back. On the front of the 3rd Army continued. By the evening of July 26, the Austro-Hungarian XI and German Beskid Corps pushed back the 3rd Caucasian and 14th Army Corps. Attempts to counterattack until the morning of July 27 led to an advance of 600 steps towards the enemy, well entrenched in the captured positions. In two days, 2,000 Russian and 427 German soldiers were taken prisoner. The situation escalated in the sector of the 8th Army of the Southwestern Front. The Austro-Hungarian 2nd Army of Cavalry General E. von Böhm-Ermolli went on the offensive on July 25 and crossed the Bug the next day. Having received the 4th Finnish Rifle Division from the reserve, A. Brusilov organised counterattacks with the forces of the 8th, 12th, 17th and 28th Army Corps. During July 26–28, it was possible to localise the advance of the Austro-Hungarians. However, the heavy losses suffered in the battles affected the combat capabilities of the 8th Army: it was not possible to liquidate the enemy bridgeheads on the Bug River.

At 1.30 am on July 29, the Landwehr Corps of the army of R. von Woyrsch began to cross the Vistula with four detachments. The selected section of the 16th Army Corps of the Russian 4th Army was weakened by the direction of two brigades to Ivangorod and the Narew River. By 4.30 all the detachments were transferred to the east coast and were able to gain a foothold. Attempts to throw the Germans into the Vistula failed, by 7 o'clock a 1160-meter bridge was built, along which the last regiment of the 3rd Landwehr Division crossed the river. At 15 o'clock, the chief of the staff of the North-Western Front, M. Alekseyev, ordered the 2nd and 4th Armies to throw the enemy into the Vistula River. Despite the damage to the bridge by Russian artillery, the Germans entrenched themselves on the eastern bank of the Vistula by evening with the forces of the 3rd and 4th Landwehr Divisions.

At the same time, on the morning of July 29, the strike group of Otto von Emmich from the German 11th Army broke through the positions of the 2nd Siberian Army Corps to a depth of 8 km and cut the railway between Lublin and Kholm. The commander of the 2nd Siberian Army Corps, Radko Dmitriev, reported that he would not be able to hold on to a new position; the commander of the 3rd Army, L. Lesh, was ordered to hold out to the last drop of blood and threw into battle the reserve - the 10th Army Corps. L. Lesh was sure that the line of the Wieprz river could be held, but at 18 o'clock the German guard on pontoons crossed the river and occupied the prepared Russian trenches until the approach of the 10th Army Corps. The unexpected entry of the enemy on the flanks of the Russian Guards and the 5th Siberian Rifle Division caused a disorderly withdrawal. On the night of July 30, L. Lesh, in view of the unreliability of the army's position, asked for permission to withdraw troops. Departure began at 3 o'clock.

Despite the difficult situation in the 3rd Army, the troops of the 13th Army managed to repel the attacks of the Army of the Bug. To a large extent, the actions of the troops of V. Gorbatovsky were facilitated by the transition to the offensive of the 8th Army of the South-Western Front on the night of July 29. The 1st Austro-Hungarian Army was pinned down. At 5 o'clock on July 30, the withdrawal of the Russian armies to new positions was discovered by the enemy. The Austro-Hungarian 4th and German 11th Armies began the pursuit. All free forces of the Russianh 4th Army were thrown against the Landwehr Corps, which had already captured a 25-km section of the right bank of the Vistula. Between the trenches of the opponents was only 400–500 metres, the battles were fierce and stubborn. During July 30, the 11th and Bug Armies reached the new positions of the 3rd and 13th Armies. On the night of August 1, the 13th Army retreated. L. Lesh, after the news of the retreat of the troops of V. Gorbatovsky, withdrew the 3rd Army at night.

To develop success, Mackensen created two strike groups in the German 11th Army. At midnight on August 1, the shock groups of the German 11th Army went on the offensive. At the main position of the corps of the Russian 3rd Army, they were able to hold on and repel enemy attacks, but the Army of the Bug crossed the Bug River. On August 2, the corps of X. von Köves occupied all the fortifications of the first line of the Ivangorod fortress, capturing 32 guns. During the day, all remaining artillery and ammunition were removed from the fortress; stocks of flour, cereals and oats were transferred directly to the troops of A. Evert. Throughout the front, the Russian 4th Army held its positions and was forced to retreat on the left flank only by order of the commander-in-chief of the armies of the North-Western Front M. Alekseyev - due to a breakthrough in the 3rd Army.

In the 3rd Army in the afternoon, the Central Powers's struck at the 10th and 2nd Siberian Army Corps, which hastily retreated. Lesh brought the 24th Army Corps into battle; he complained to Alekseev that "the stubbornness of the defence in the 2nd Siberian Corps is completely absent, for the third time a sudden retreat for me has begun." The 9th Army Corps was also in a difficult situation, and the 14th Army and Guards Corps were also pushed back. At night, the 3rd Army launched counterattacks, but they were repulsed by the German 11th Army. By the morning of August 3, the 3rd Army retreated to a new position prescribed by the directive of Alekseyev.

On the night of August 3, the 13th Army also began a gradual withdrawal under the blows of the Army of the Bug army. Alekseyev, taking into account the situation on the southern wing of the front, on August 2 ordered the 2nd Army to retreat to the right bank of the Vistula on the night of August 3. On August 3–4, the Russians continued to retreat. The regrouping of Mackensen's army group forces on August 4 allowed the Russian armies as a whole to freely occupy new defence lines and fortify them.

On the night of August 5, Russian troops left Ivangorod and Warsaw. In the capital of the Kingdom of Poland, during the retreat, fortress artillery and the entire supply of shells were taken out, railway stations and bridges were blown up. The option of flooding Warsaw and Novogeorgievsk was also considered, for which Major General A. von Schwartz (commandant of Ivangorod) was called to the headquarters of the armies of the North-Western Front. In the morning, the German troops of the 9th Army entered Warsaw. Together with the army of Remus von Woyrsch, they formed the army group of Field Marshal Prince Leopold of Bavaria. During August 5, the troops of the Russian 4th Army freely retreated to a new line of defence and managed to fortify themselves on it. In the sector of the 3rd Army, German troops broke through the positions of the Guards Corps at noon and brought large forces into the breakthrough. In other sectors of the front, the troops of the Central Powers continued to gradually move forward. As a result of the withdrawal of the Russian 2nd Army, A. Evert was also forced to withdraw the 4th Army on the night of August 7 to the line of the Wieprz River.

In the 4th Army on August 7, the Russian 15th Army Corps failed to repel new attacks of the Asto-Hungarians. The army of Archduke Josef Ferdinand in a sector of 15 km advanced up to 20 km deep. Up to 6,000 Russian soldiers were taken prisoner. The Russian 6th Infantry Division had 2,200 soldiers left. At 11 p.m., the withdrawal of the Russian 4th Army began. The failure of the 4th Army caused the retreat of the right flank of the 3rd Army. At the new position, the commander of the 3rd Army, Lesh, ordered "to settle down for a stubborn defence, since a withdrawal from it, according to the current situation, cannot be made in the near future."

The situation was complicated by the difficult position of the 1st and 12th Armies on the Narew and Bug rivers. Not only from the armies of the Southwestern Front, but also from the 13th Army, several divisions were taken to stop the onslaught of the German troops of Gallwitz. On August 6, the 61st and 62nd Infantry Divisions were sent to Białystok. The Germans took advantage of the weakening of the army of Gorbatovsky. The Army of the Bug on August 8 launched an offensive. The German 11th Army pushed back the troops of the 3rd Army during the day. The Austro-Hungarian 4th Army, together with the German group of O. von Emmich, attacked the 6th Siberian Army Corps of the 4th Russian Army. By the morning of August 9, the 4th Army was withdrawn. On August 10–11, the troops of the Central Powers continued their offensive with success in certain sectors of the front, meeting stubborn resistance from the Russians.

But to the north, in the 12th and 1st Armies, the situation became more and more dangerous, the German troops reached the lower reaches of the Bug River. Going on the offensive of the army group of Prince Leopold of Bavaria led to a hasty withdrawal of the Russian 2nd Army. Around noon on August 11 Alekseyev issued a directive on the general withdrawal of the armies of the southern wing on the night of August 12.

All three armies of the southern wing occupied new positions almost unhindered by 8 o'clock on August 12. At a meeting of the commanders-in-chief of the Central Powers on the Eastern Front in Lublin, it was decided to allocate large Austro-Hungarian forces for the upcoming operation in Eastern Galicia and Volhynia and to develop the offensive of the Mackensen's army group in the northeast direction. On the night of August 13, Evert, Lesh and Gorbatovsky, on the orders of Alekseyev, continued the withdrawal of troops to Brest-Litovsk.

The German High Command has not yet lost hope of "setting up little Cannes" by encircling the Russian troops between the Bug River and Białowieża Forest. To do this, Mackensen had to ensure the direction to Brest-Litovsk, the army group of Prince Leopold of Bavaria near Nemyriv and Kleszczele went to the rear of the Russian troops retreating across the Bug River, and the army of M. von Gallwitz was supposed to close the ring at Belsk.

On August 13, the Central Powers discovered the withdrawal of Russian troops early in the morning and began a pursuit. On August 14–20, the retreat of the Russian army continued. As a result of the German armies of Prince Leopold of Bavaria and Mackensen reaching the Bug River, Brest-Litovsk was in a semi-encirclement. The Russian 77th Infantry Division and the 24th Home Guard Brigade were urgently transferred to the fortress, where the 22nd, 32nd, 82nd State Militia Brigades and the 81st Infantry Division were already concentrated. But the Germans, having left on the morning of August 17 to the outer forts, began preparations for the assault: 30.5 cm mortars were brought to Brest-Litovsk.

On August 24, 11 batteries of heavy howitzers were brought to the forts of the outer contour of Brest-Litovsk, a battery of 10 cm and 15 cm guns, 3 batteries of 21 cm mortars, 6 Austrian and one German 30.5 cm mortar batteries, a battery of 42 cm guns. 24,800 heavy shells were fired to bombard the fortress, including 1,310 for 30.5 cm mortars and 170 for 42 cm mortars. The 6th Austro-Hungarian, Beskidenkorps and XXII Reserve Corps attacked the positions of the defenders of Brest-Litovsk on August 25, when explosions began in the fortress and the city and a giant flame rose from warehouses set on fire by Russian troops. The 119th Infantry Division occupied the forts, the 43rd Reserve Division entered the citadel, and at 3 o'clock on August 26, the corps of Arthur Arz von Straußenburg occupied the city, immediately starting to extinguish fires. Not wanting to repeat the fate of Novogeorgievsk in Brest, Alekseyev agreed to the immediate abandonment of the fortress. The 4th Army was also withdrawn, although the enemy only approached its positions during the day. In 2-3 transitions starting from the night of August 26 the 2nd, 3rd and 4th Armies were withdrawn. During the retreat, it was necessary to spoil and fill up roads with fences, blow up bridges and gati. “The Commander-in-Chief orders to remember the great war of 1812 and to draw from it teaching and deep faith in our final victory,” Evert appealed to the troops.

Radio messages from the headquarters of the armies of the North-Western Front about the withdrawal of armies to new positions on the night of August 26 were intercepted and decoded at the headquarters of Hindenburg, Mackensen and Prince Leopold of Bavaria. From the night began the pursuit of the retreating Russian troops.

With the fall of Brest-Litovsk, the Vistula–Bug offensive ended.

== Outcome ==
The offensive of the armies of the Central Powers on the southern wing of the Russian North-Western Front in July–August 1915 acquired the character of a frontal operation, but the Central Powers failed to carry out a deep breakthrough of the Russian positions. The Russian troops of the 4th, 3rd and 13th Armies stubbornly and skillfully defended themselves. But in the face of a shortage of ammunition not only for artillery, but also for hand weapons, which escalated precisely during this period, not only attempts at counterattacks, but also a long-term defence of positions broken by gun fire, turned into the extermination of Russian troops. Therefore, the Russian side continued to adhere to the tactics of combining the stubborn defence of the occupied lines and nightly retreat marches.

The trophies of the Central Powers were 113,975 prisoners (of which 457 officers), 228 machine guns and 38 field guns, partly - weapons and supplies of the fortresses Ivangorod and Brest-Litovsk. From intense firing or shell hits, 50 machine guns and 230 guns failed (of which 8 were broken). Russian troops captured 16,709 prisoners (256 of them officers), several machine guns, 2 aircraft (fallen or crashed at the location of the Russian armies).

The retreat of the Russian armies from the Kingdom of Poland was accompanied by the removal of valuable property, the destruction of crops and crops, and the burning of settlements. As a result of arson and hostilities, 119,880 farms were destroyed, more than half of them with an allotment of less than 5 hectares, 698,600 horses and 213,000 cattle were stolen or slaughtered, 12,428 houses were burned. 124,000 Jews and 200,000 Germans were subjected to forced deportation to the eastern provinces.
