= Linsingen =

Linsingen may refer to:

- Linsingen (Frielendorf), a constituent community of Frielendorf, Hesse, Germany
- Army Group Linsingen, a German army group which operated in Poland during World War I
- Alexander von Linsingen (1850–1935), German general during World War I
- Wilhelm von Linsingen, commander in the Anglo-allied army in the battle of Waterloo (1815), see order of battle of the Waterloo Campaign
- Karl von Linsingen, commander of Hesse-Kassel troops in the Battle of Boxtel (1794)
