= II Royal Bavarian Reserve Corps =

II Royal Bavarian Reserve Corps II. Königlich Bayerisches Reserve-Korps
- Flag of the Staff of a Generalkommando (1871–1918)
- Active: December 1914 – 7 July 1915
- Country: Bavaria / German Empire
- Type: Corps
- Engagements: World War I

Insignia
- Abbreviation: II Bavarian RK

The II Royal Bavarian Reserve Corps / II Bavarian RK (German: II. Königlich Bayerisches Reserve-Korps) was a corps level command of the Royal Bavarian Army, part of the German Army during World War I. (Note: From the late 1800s, the Prussian Army was effectively the German Army as, during the period of German unification (1866-1871), the states of the German Empire entered into conventions with Prussia regarding their armies. Only the Bavarian Army remained fully autonomous and came under Prussian control only during wartime.) The corps only existed for a few months before the Staff was used to form a new Staff for the South Army on the Eastern Front.

== History ==
In peacetime, the German Army only conscripted about half of those eligible to serve, as the population was too numerous for its establishment. (Note: The peacetime German Army was limited by law to 1% of the population, about 65 million in 1910.) The remainder were posted to the Landsturm or the Ersatz Reserve.

At the outbreak of the War, a large number of volunteers flocked to the colours. In October 1914, these formed the XXII–XXVII Reserve Corps (43rd–54th Reserve Divisions) plus the 6th Bavarian Reserve Division). Similarly, in December 1914, a second wave of corps (XXXVIII–XXXXI (Note: In German military nomenclature, "40" was rendered as "XXXX" in Roman numerals rather than the more conventional "XL".) Reserve Corps) and divisions (75th–82nd Reserve Divisions along with 8th Bavarian Reserve Division) was formed. The personnel predominantly comprised kriegsfreiwillige (wartime volunteers) who did not wait to be called up.

In keeping with the then normal practice of two divisions forming a corps, the II Royal Bavarian Reserve Corps was formed in December 1914. It was commanded by General der Infanterie Felix Graf von Bothmer, who was brought out of retirement. The Corps was renamed as Corps Bothmer on 22 March 1915. The Corps had a relatively brief existence: on 7 July 1915, the headquarters was upgraded to that of South Army on the Eastern Front when the original command was transformed into the Army of the Bug.

== Commanders ==
II Bavarian Reserve Corps was commanded throughout its existence by General der Infanterie Felix Graf von Bothmer.

== See also ==
- Bavarian Army
- 6th Bavarian Reserve Division
- 8th Bavarian Reserve Division
- South Army

== Bibliography ==
- Cron, Hermann (2002). Imperial German Army 1914-18: Organisation, Structure, Orders-of-Battle [first published: 1937]. Helion & Co. ISBN 1-874622-70-1.
- Ellis, John; Cox, Michael (1993). The World War I Databook. Aurum Press Ltd. ISBN 1-85410-766-6.
- Haythornthwaite, Philip J. (1996). The World War One Source Book. Arms and Armour. ISBN 1-85409-351-7.
- Histories of Two Hundred and Fifty-One Divisions of the German Army which Participated in the War (1914-1918), compiled from records of Intelligence section of the General Staff, American Expeditionary Forces, at General Headquarters, Chaumont, France 1919. The London Stamp Exchange Ltd. 1989 [1920]. ISBN 0-948130-87-3.
- The German Forces in the Field; 7th Revision, 11th November 1918; Compiled by the General Staff, War Office. Imperial War Museum, London and the Battery Press. 1995 [1918]. ISBN 978-1-870423-95-3.
