= Hans Ritter von Hemmer =

- Native name: Hans Ritter von Hemmer
- Born: Hans Hemmer; June 26, 1869; Munich, Kingdom of Bavaria
- Died: 15 December 1931 (aged 62) Munich, Bavaria, Weimar Germany
- Allegiance: Kingdom of Bavaria; German Empire; Weimar Republic
- Branch: (Kingdom of Bavaria) Royal Bavarian Army; Imperial German Army; Reichswehr
- Service years: 1886–1925
- Rank: Oberst, Generalmajor (Charakter)
- Conflicts: World War I
- Awards: Pour le Mérite; Military Order of Max Joseph

Hans Ritter (Note: "Ritter" (knight) is a German title of nobility roughly translating as "Sir". For knights of the Bavarian Order of Merit of the Bavarian Crown and the Military Order of Max Joseph who were not already members of the nobility, the title was a personal, non-hereditary, one.) von Hemmer (26 June 1869 – 15 December 1931), was a general staff officer in the Royal Bavarian Army. A highly decorated veteran of World War I, he was a recipient of both the Knight's Cross and the Commander's Cross of the Military Order of Max Joseph, the Kingdom of Bavaria's highest military honor, as well as the Pour le Mérite, the Kingdom of Prussia's highest military honor.

== Life and career ==
Hans Hemmer was born on 26 June 1869 in Munich, Kingdom of Bavaria as the son of Oberst (Colonel) Anton Hemmer and his wife Ida, née Weißmann.

After graduation from the humanistic Gymnasium in Regensburg, on 12 August 1888 Hemmer entered the Royal Bavarian 11th Infantry Regiment "Von der Tann" (Königlich Bayerisches 11. Infanterie-Regiment „von der Tann“) as an officer candidate. On 7 July 1889, he was transferred to the Royal Bavarian 2nd Infantry Regiment "Crown Prince" (Königlich Bayerisches 2. Infanterie Regiment „Kronprinz“) and on 6 March 1890 he was commissioned a Sekondelieutenant. Hemmer served as a battalion adjutant in that regiment from 15 February 1893 to 1 June 1896, after which he was sent for 3 years of general staff training to the Bavarian War Academy.

In 1900, he began two one-year temporary assignments with the general staff of the Bavarian Army. From 1902 to 1906, he served as adjutant of the 3rd Infantry Brigade of the 2nd Royal Bavarian Division, during which time he was promoted to Hauptmann. On 20 October 1907, he was named a company commander in the Royal Bavarian 8th Infantry Regiment "Grand Duke Friedrich II of Baden" (Königlich Bayerisches 8. Infanterie-Regiment „Großherzog Friedrich II. von Baden“). Two years later, he was assigned as a general staff officer in the staff of the 5th Royal Bavarian Division.

In 1910, he was transferred to the Central Office (Zentralstelle) of the Bavarian General Staff in Munich and commanded to the Prussian Great General Staff (Großer Generalstab) in Berlin. Concurrently, Hemmer served as the statutory member of the Bavarian senate in the Reich Military Court (Reichsmilitärgericht). On 19 September 1912, Hemmer was assigned as 1st General Staff Officer on the general staff of the I Royal Bavarian Army Corps, a position he held through the start of World War I.

=== World War I ===
In World War I, Hemmer participated in the fighting in August 1914 at the Battle of Lorraine, and along of the Somme on the Western Front. On 30 November 1914, he was promoted to Oberstleutnant (lieutenant colonel) and on 28 December 1914, he was named chief of the general staff of the I Royal Bavarian Reserve Corps.

Having been transferred to the Eastern Front, Hemmer distinguished himself as chief of the general staff of the South Army in Galicia under General Felix Graf von Bothmer, and was decorated with the Knight's Cross of the Military Order of Max Joseph, Bavaria's highest military honor. The order was awarded on 8 November 1915 and he was elevated to the nobility as "Ritter von Hemmer" on 4 December 1915. The grounds for the award was "for his outstanding activity as chief of the general staff during the storming of Zwinin on 9 April 1915 and in the battle by Stryi on 31 May 1915."

On 6 July 1915, he was officially named chief of the general staff of the South Army. In 1916, he was involved in the heavy fighting in Galicia and the Carpathians. In recommending him for the Commander's Cross of the Military Order of Max Joseph, Graf von Bothmer cited him "for his outstanding merits, characterized by exceptional intelligence, energy and tireless perseverance, in the preparation and successful execution of the challenging defensive battles during the Russian summer offensive of 1916." The award was approved on 22 March 1917.

Ritter von Hemmer continued to serve as chief of the general staff of the South Army in the fighting on the Eastern Front in 1917. He was awarded the Order Pour le Mérite, Prussia's highest military honor, on 25 August 1917, and was promoted to Oberst (colonel) on 14 December 1917. After the peace of Brest-Litovsk with the Russians, he was transferred back to the Western Front.

On 4 February 1918, he was named chief of the general staff of the 19th Army, again under General Graf von Bothmer, serving in Lorraine. After the Armistice on November 11, he and General der Infanterie Karl Ritter von Fasbender, who had assumed command of the 19th Army on 8 November, oversaw the withdrawal of the 19th Army back to German territory.

== Post-war service ==
The 19th Army was demobilized on 18 December 1918, and in January 1919, Ritter von Hemmer was again named a statutory member of the Bavarian Senate of the Reichsmilitärgericht (Reich Military Court). He retired on 1 October 1920, and a day later was given the Charakter of Generalmajor.

He died on 15 December 1931 in Munich of a heart attack.

== Decorations and awards ==
- Kingdom of Bavaria:
  - Military Order of Max Joseph, Knight's Cross for actions on 9 April 1915, awarded on 8 November 1915, entered into the Adelsmatrikel on 4 December 1915
  - Military Order of Max Joseph, Commander's Cross for actions on 4 June 1916, awarded on 22 March 1917
  - Military Merit Order, Officer's Cross with Swords (26 October 1916)
  - Military Merit Order, 3rd Class with Crown and Swords (2 May 1915)
  - Military Merit Order, 4th Class
  - Jubilee Medal of the Bavarian Army
  - Officer's Service Decoration Cross, 2nd Class
- Kingdom of Prussia:
  - Order Pour le Mérite (25 August 1917)
  - Order of the Red Eagle, 3rd Class with Swords (15 May 1915)
  - Order of the Crown, 4th Class
  - Royal House Order of Hohenzollern, Knight's Cross with Swords (18 November 1916)
  - Iron Cross 1st (5 December 1914) and 2nd Class (16 October 1914)
- Kingdom of Saxony: Albert Order, Officer's Cross with Swords (26 July 1917)
- Kingdom of Württemberg: Friedrich Order, Knight's Cross 1st Class
- Grand Duchy of Baden: Order of the Zähringer Lion, Knight's Cross 2nd Class with Oakleaves
- Duchy of Anhalt: Friedrich Cross (19 July 1917)
- Free and Hanseatic City of Hamburg: Hanseatic Cross (13 December 1916)
- Austria-Hungary:
  - Order of Leopold, Knight's Cross with War Decoration (4 January 1916)
  - Order of the Iron Crown, 2nd Class with War Decoration ( 5 September 1916)
  - Military Merit Cross, 2nd Class with War Decoration (10 November 1917)
  - Military Merit Cross, 3rd Class with War Decoration (28 July 1915)
- Ottoman Empire:
  - Liakat Medal in Silver with Sabers
  - War Medal (22 January 1916)

== Bibliography ==
- Karl-Friedrich Hildebrand, Christian Zweng: Die Ritter des Ordens Pour le Mérite des I. Weltkriegs. Band 2: H–O. Biblio Verlag, Bissendorf 2003, ISBN 3-7648-2516-2, pp. 66–67.
- Konrad Krafft von Dellmensingen, Friedrichfranz Feeser, Das Bayernbuch vom Weltkriege 1914–1918, Chr. Belser AG, Verlagsbuchhandlung, Stuttgart 1930.
- Rudolf von Kramer, Otto Freiherr von Waldenfels and Dr. Günther Freiherr von Pechmann: Virtuti Pro Patria: Der königlich bayerische Militär-Max-Joseph-Orden, Selbstverlag des k. b. Militär-Max-Joseph-Ordens, München 1966.
- Hanns Möller: Geschichte der Ritter des Ordens pour le mérite im Weltkrieg. Band I: A–L. Verlag Bernard & Graefe, Berlin 1935, pp. 469–471.
