= G39 =

G39, G-39 or G.39 may refer to:

- Glock 39, a firearm
- SMS G39, an Imperial German Navy torpedo boat
