= Pohulanka =

Pohulanka may refer to the following places in Poland:

- Pohulanka, Chełm County in Lublin Voivodeship (east Poland)
- Pohulanka, Parczew County in Lublin Voivodeship (east Poland)
- Pohulanka, Podlaskie Voivodeship (north-east Poland)
- Pohulanka, Masovian Voivodeship (east-central Poland)

== See also ==
- Pohulanka Theatre, the former name of the Old Theatre of Vilnius
