= Felix Graf von Bothmer =

German general (1852–1937)

- Born: 10 December 1852; Munich, Kingdom of Bavaria, German Confederation
- Died: 18 March 1937 (aged 84); Munich, Nazi Germany
- Relatives: ∞ 1882 Auguste von Baldinger
- Military career
- Allegiance: Kingdom of Bavaria; German Empire
- Branch: Bavarian Army; Imperial German Army
- Service years: 1871–1918
- Rank: Colonel General
- Commands: 6th Bavarian Reserve Division; II Bavarian Reserve Corps; South Army; 19th Army; Heimatschütz Süd
- Conflicts: World War I
- Awards: Military Order of Max Joseph, Grand Cross; Pour le Mérite with oak leaves Order of the Dannebrog, Knight's Cross

Felix Ludwig Graf von Bothmer (10 December 1852 – 18 March 1937) was a German general from Bavaria. He notably served in the Brusilov offensive of World War I.

== Military Career and After ==
After completing the royal pagery, Graf von Bothmer joined the Bavarian Army on 12 February 1871 serving with the Royal Bavarian Life Guards. He spent most of the following forty years serving in the Bavarian War Ministry or on the Royal Bavarian Army General Staff, with stints of line duty and three years in Berlin with the Prussian General Staff. Rising through the ranks; in 1910 he was promoted to General der Infanterie. Before World War I Bothmer fractured a leg which rendered him unfit for field duty, resulting in him having to wait for a command until December. On 30 November 1914 he was appointed to command the 6th Bavarian Reserve Division at Ypres.

On 22 March 1915 he was given the command of Corps Bothmer, a unit raised to help defend the passes of the Carpathian Mountains against Russian attacks that directly threatened Hungary. He won the Battle of Zwinin which took place from 5 February – 9 April 1915, and was thus in the right place to take part in the great German advance after the breakthrough during the Gorlice–Tarnów Offensive in May 1915.

After 6 July 1915, Hans Ritter von Hemmer was his Chief of General Staff. On 7 July, he was awarded the Pour le Mérite for outstanding leadership and distinguished military planning and successful operations during the battles of Dniester, Gnila-Lipa, and Zlota-Lipa. A day later Bothmer succeeded Alexander von Linsingen as commander of the South Army, which consisted of German and Austrian units. He was awarded the oak leaves to his Pour le Merite on 25 July 1917 for his actions during the battle around the city of Brzezany during the German summer offensive on the eastern front, as well as for his leadership and during the battle at the bridgehead at Zbrucz. He also received the Grand Cross of the Bavarian Military Order of Max Joseph.

His units stood firm against the Brusilov Offensive of June 1916. In 1917, he was appointed to command the 19th Army in Lorraine. He remained there until 8 November 1918, while to the north the German front crumbled. Bothmer retired from the army in November 1918. Bothmer's last job in the army, again along with von Hemmer, was as an adviser for the Bavarian Ministry for Military Affairs from November to December 1918, mostly overseeing the demobilization of the soon-to-be-disbanded Bavarian Army.

After the war, he lived in Munich. After the Beer Hall Putsch, Bothmer said during the trials of Adolf Hitler that the putsch was well prepared.

Count Bothmer died in Munich on 18 March 1937 and, contrary to his family's wishes, Adolf Hitler's government ordered a state funeral. He was eulogized by Prince Rupprecht of Bavaria.

== Family ==
Bothmer's father was Lieutenant General Maximilian "Max" Joseph Graf von Bothmer (1816–1878) and belonged to an old German nobility. His uncle was General der Infanterie Friedrich Ludwig Carl Ernst Graf von Bothmer (1805–1886). Felix Graf von Bothmer married his fiancée Auguste von Baldinger (1855–1941) on 22 July 1882. They had 2 daughters together.

== Military ranks ==
- Officiers-Aspirant 1. Classe: 12 February 1871
- Unterlieutenant (renamed Second-Lieutenant in 1872): 28 November 1871
- Premier-Lieutenant: 23 November 1882
- Hauptmann: 31 October 1888 without Patent
  - received Patent on 15 February 1889
- Major: 22 September 1893
- Oberst-Lieutenant: 17 March 1897
- Oberst: 21 July 1900
- Generalmajor: 18 May 1903
- Generalleutnant: 15 September 1905
- General der Infanterie: 4 May 1910
- Generaloberst: 9 April 1918

== Decorations and Honours ==
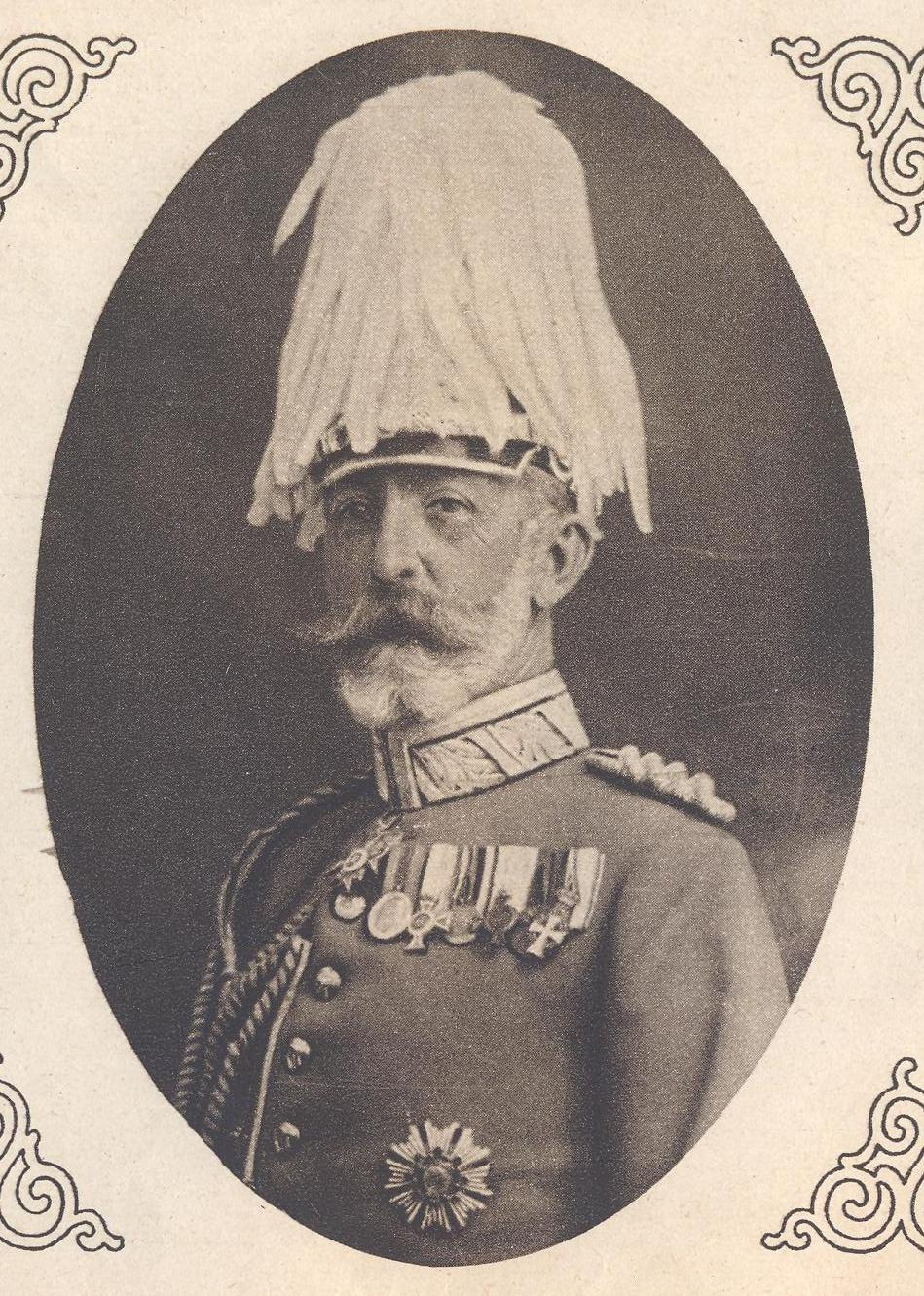
Bothmer in 1915

Bavaria

- Military Order of Max Joseph, Knight's Cross (1915), Commander's Cross (1915) and Grand Cross (1916)
- Military Merit Order, 1st Class, Swords to 1st Class and Grand Cross with Swords
- Service Decoration, 1st Class
- Ludwigs-Orden, Honor Cross
- Jubilee Medal
- Merit Order of St. Michael, 1st Class

Prussia

- Order of the Red Eagle, 1st Class
- Pour le Mérite with Oakleaves
- 1914 Iron Cross 1st Class
- 1914 Iron Cross 2nd Class
- War Commemorative Medal of 1870/71 in Steel on the Ribbon for Combatants (German Award)
- Centenary Medal
- Prussian Order of the Crown, 1st Class
- The Honour Cross of the World War 1914/1918 (German Award)

Other German states

- Anhalt: Friedrich Cross
- Bremen: Hanseatic Cross
- Brunswick: House Order of Henry the Lion, Grand Cross
- Hesse-Darmstadt: Order of Philip the Magnanimous, Grand Cross with Crown
- Hohenzollern: Princely House Order of Hohenzollern, 1st Class with Swords
- Lübeck: Hanseatic Cross
- Saxony: Albert Order, Grand Cross and Star and Swords to Grand Cross
- Saxony: Military Order of St. Henry, Knight's Cross and Commander's Cross
- Württemberg: Order of the Württemberg Crown, Grand Cross

Other countries

- Austria-Hungary: Imperial Austrian Order of Leopold, Grand Cross with War Decoration
- Austria-Hungary: Imperial Austrian Order of the Iron Crown, Knight 1st Class with War Decoration
- Austria-Hungary: Military Merit Cross, 1st Class with War Decoration
- Austria-Hungary: Large Military Merit Medal in Gold (Grand Military Merit Medal) on the Ribbon of the Medal for Bravery
- Austria-Hungary: Red Cross Decoration 1st Class with War Decoration
- Ottoman Empire: Imtiaz Medal in Gold with Swords
- Ottoman Empire: Liakat Medal in Gold with Swords
- Ottoman Empire: Turkish War Medal (so-called "Gallipoli Star")
- Ottoman Empire: Order of Medjidie, 1st Class with Swords

Foreign awards (pre-WWI)

- Denmark: Order of the Dannebrog, Knight
- Japan: Order of the Sacred Treasure, Grand Officer's Cross
- Spain: Grand Cross of the Order of Military Merit (Spain)

The orders above which were from Allied nations were awarded prior to World War I.

== Additional Reading ==
- Konrad Krafft von Dellmensingen, Friedrichfranz Feeser, "Das Bayernbuch vom Weltkriege 1914-1918", I. Band, Chr. Belser AG, Verlagsbuchhandlung, Stuttgart 1930
- Günter Wegner, Deutschlands Heere bis 1918, Band 10, Bayern, Biblio Verlag, Osnabrück, 1984
- Rudolf v. Kramer, Otto Freiherr von Waldenfels, Der königlich bayerische Militär-Max-Joseph-Orden, Selbstverlag des k. b. Militär-Max-Joseph-Ordens, München 1966

Military offices
Preceded by New Formation	Commander, II Royal Bavarian Reserve Corps; December 1914 – 7 July 1915	Succeeded by Upgraded to new South Army
Preceded by General der Infanterie Alexander von Linsingen	Commander, South Army; 8 July 1915 – 25 January 1918	Succeeded by Dissolved
Preceded by New Formation	Commander, 19th Army; 4 February 1918 – 8 November 1918	Succeeded by General der Infanterie Karl von Fasbender
