= Frederickscross =

Frederick-Cross (Friedrich-Kreuz)
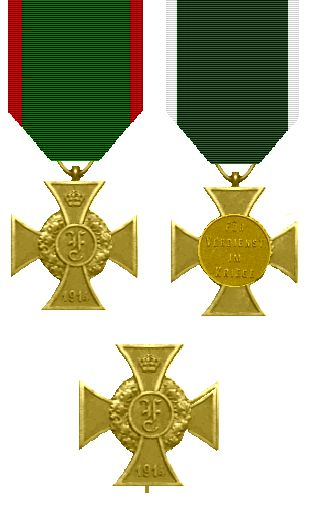
- Type: Military decoration
- Awarded for: War merit
- Presented by: Anhalt
- Established: 1914
- Final award: 1918
- Ribbon awarded to combatants

The Frederickcross (German: Friedrich Kreuz or Friedrich-Kreuz) was instituted in 1914 by the ruling Duke of Anhalt, Frederick II of Anhalt as a decoration not unlike the Iron Cross for merit in time of war.

There are three versions of the Frederickcross

- A bronze cross on a green ribbon with red borders for combatants.
- A bronze cross on a green ribbon with white borders for non-combatants.
- A cross as a brooch (in German a "steckkreuz") that was worn without a ribbon. (Note: The statutes of the Friedrich Cross provided for only a single class worn from a ribbon. While there was some consideration in 1918 toward establishing a pinback 1st class version similar to the Iron Cross 1st Class, the war ended without any official action being taken. Thus the pinback versions produced after the war were unofficial.)

This cross pattée bore a crown on the upper arm and the date "1914" on the lower arm. In the central medallion is the monogram of the duke, two intertwined "F"'s. The reverse is flat but the central medallion bears the text "Für Verdienst" (For Merit")

In 1918 the Anhalt monarchy fell and the decoration was abolished.

Ribbon awarded to non-combatants

== Recipients ==
- Friedrich II, Duke of Anhalt
- Prince Aribert of Anhalt
- Rupprecht, Crown Prince of Bavaria
- Wilhelm II, German Emperor
- Prince Friedrich Leopold of Prussia
- Oswald Boelcke
- Felix Graf von Bothmer
- Franz Breithaupt
- Leopold Bürkner
- Gerhard Conrad
- Karl Dönitz
- Theodor Duesterberg
- Hans Heinrich XV, Prince of Pless
- Paul Hausser
- Hans Ritter von Hemmer
- Paul von Hindenburg
- Hans-Valentin Hube
- Max Immelmann
- Robert Kosch
- Georg von Küchler
- Wilhelm Friedrich Loeper
- Oswald Lutz
- Theo Osterkamp
- Friedrich von Rabenau
- Friedrich Sixt von Armin
