= Battle of Kowel =

1916 WWI battle on the Eastern Front

- Part of The Brusilov offensive (World War I)
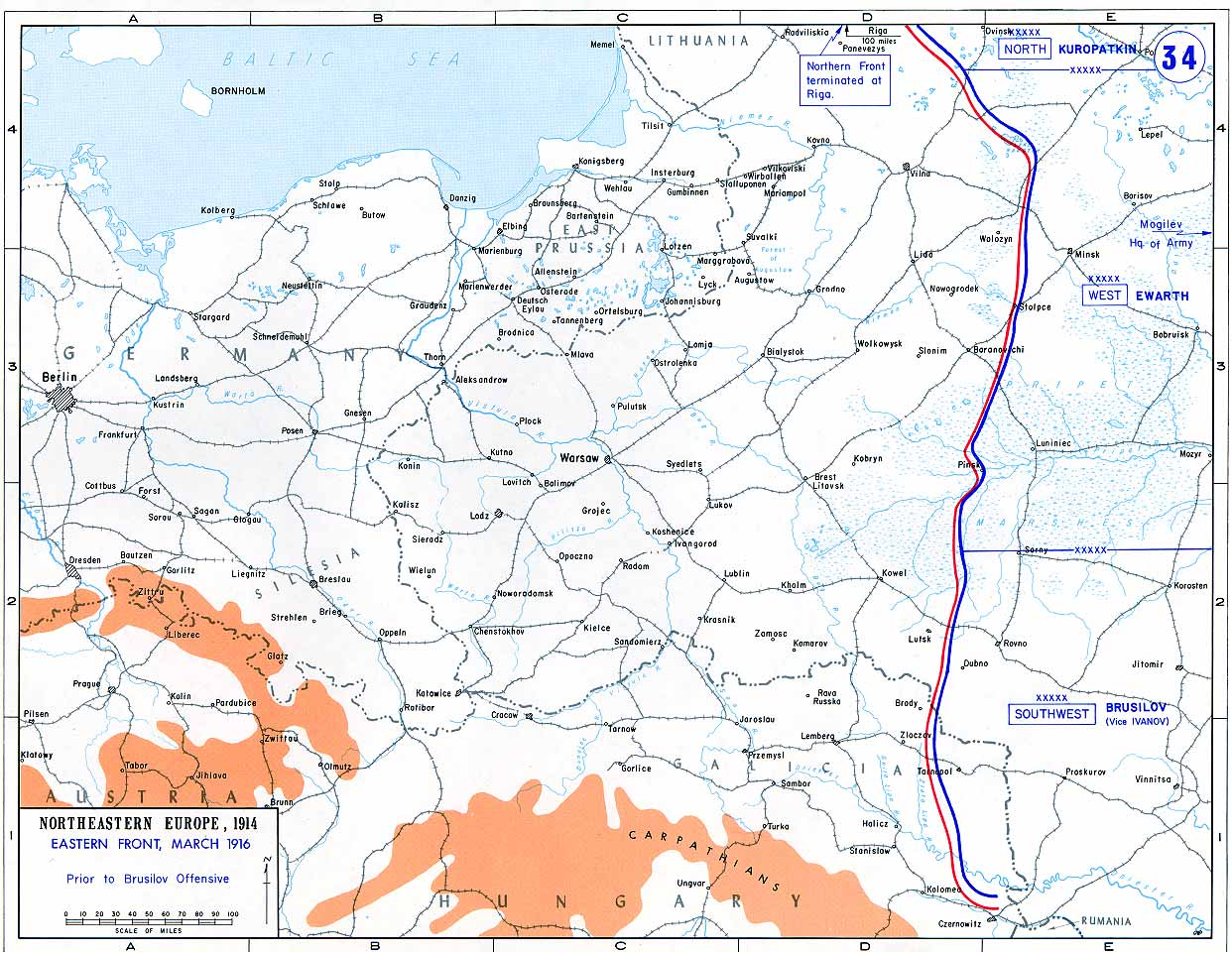
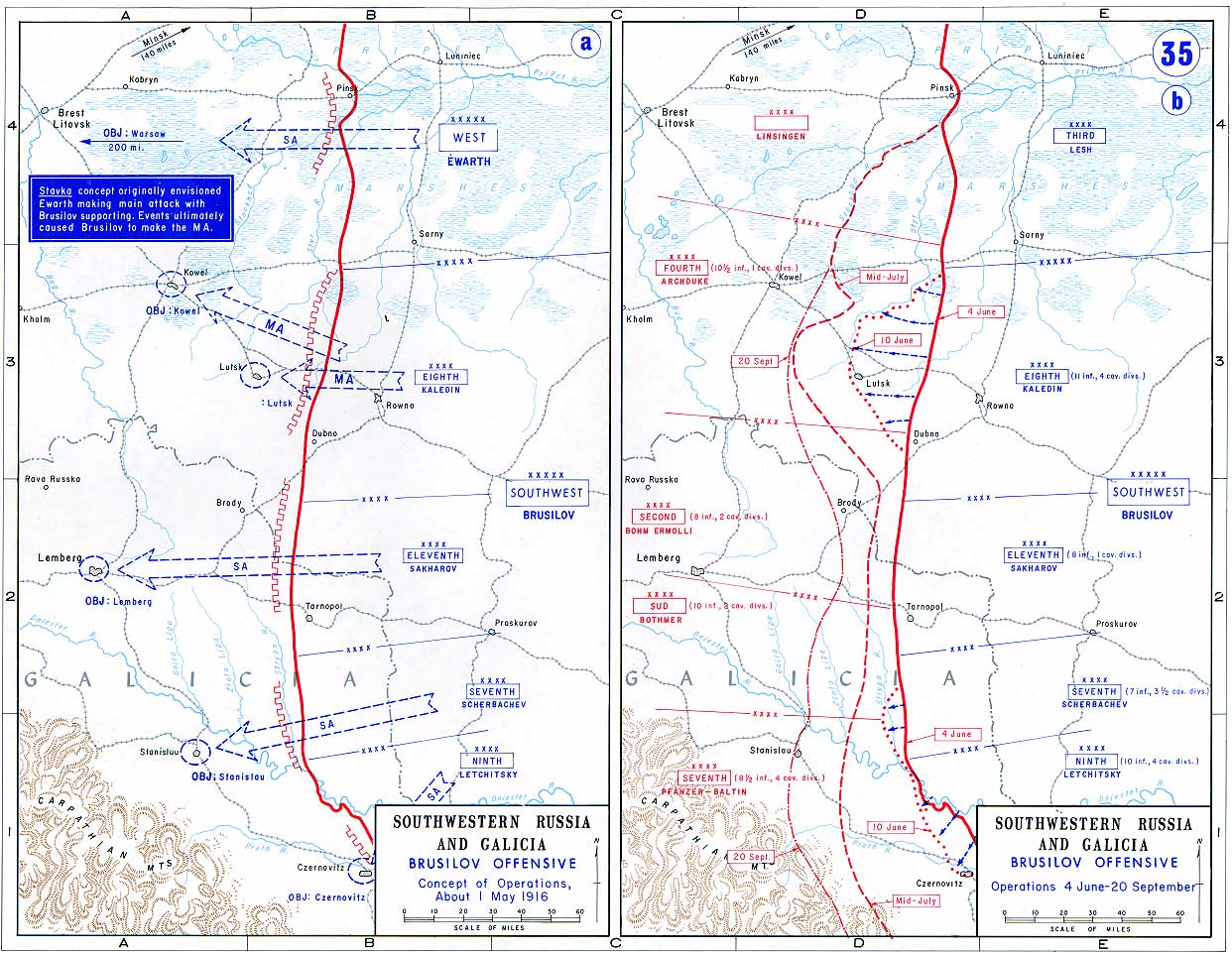
- The Eastern Front before and during the Brusilov Offensive
Date	28 July 1916 – 8 August 1916
Location	Galicia and Volhynia
Result	Central Powers victory

Belligerents
Austria-Hungary; German Empire	Russian Empire

Commanders and leaders
(Austria-Hungary) Conrad von Hötzendorf (German Empire) Alexander von Linsingen	Aleksei Brusilov; Vladimir Sakharov; Vladimir Bezobrazov

Strength
12 divisions (23,000 infantry) and 11 cavalry divisions	29 divisions (30,000 infantry), 12 cavalry divisions and elements of the Imperial Guard

Casualties and losses
9,000	11,000 infantry and cavalry 30,000 guardsmen

The Battle of Kowel (also known as the Battle of Kovel or the Battle of Kovel-Stanislav) took place during World War I, from 28 July to 8 August 1916. It began with an Austrian counter-attack by Alexander von Linsingen south of Kowel, a city located in the Volyn Oblast (province), in north-western Ukraine. Linsingen intended to halt the Russian offensive under the command of General Aleksei Alekseevich Brusilov.

== Background ==
The Brusilov offensive began on 4 June 1916, it was the greatest Russian feat of arms during World War I, and among the most lethal battles in world history. It was a major offensive against the armies of the Central Powers on the Eastern Front. Mounting pressure from the western Allies caused the Russians to hurry their preparations. Brusilov amassed four armies totalling 40 infantry divisions and 15 cavalry divisions. He faced 39 Austrian infantry divisions and 10 cavalry divisions formed in a row of three defensive lines, although later German reinforcements were brought up.

The breakthrough came when, on 4 June, the Russians opened the offensive with a massive, accurate, but brief artillery barrage against the Austro-Hungarian lines. On 8 June Russian forces of the South-western Front took Lutsk. By now the Austrians were in full retreat and the Russians had taken over 200,000 prisoners; however, Brusilov's forces were becoming overextended. In a meeting held on the same day Lutsk fell, German chief of staff Erich von Falkenhayn persuaded Austrian field marshal Franz Conrad von Hötzendorf to redeploy troops from the Italian Front to counter the Russians in Galicia. General Paul von Hindenburg was again able to capitalize on good railroads to bring German reinforcements east. At last, on 18 June, a weak and poorly prepared offensive commenced under Alexei Evert, and on 24 July Alexander von Linsingen commenced his own counter-attack. Brusilov and Russian Tsar Nicholas II ordered other Russian commanders to commence their own attacks, however high casualties and internal rivalry meant that this did not occur.

== The battle ==
The Tsar had provided large amounts of artillery and shells for Brusilov's army; however, this had repercussions for the Russians as Brusilov reverted to the tactic of extensive barrages followed by waves of advancing soldiers, a tactic that had proved unsuccessful since 1915 with German commanders observing the new similarities between Kowel and the Western Front.

The German commander, Linsingen, sought to check the Russian army under the command of General Brusilov. The Russian force of 29 Infantry and 12 Cavalry divisions faced only 12 Austrian divisions, however the ineffective barrage and the tactic of using 'waves' of attacking soldiers resulting in significant Russian casualties and the stalling of the Brusilov offensive.

== Consequences ==
The 500,000 Russian casualties during the offensive, culminating in the battle of Kowel "finished Russia as an active participant in the war" with its consumption of men and resources. Sir George Buchanan (diplomat) British Ambassador to the Russian Empire, expressed his view about results in the battle: “The losses which Russia has suffered are so colossal that whole country is mourning. So many lives have been uselessly sacrificed in the recent unsuccessful attacks against Kovel and other places, that the impression is gaining ground that is useless continuing the struggle, and that Russia, unlike Great Britain, has nothing to gain by prolonging the war.” The battle also had a far reaching impact on Austria, as it illustrated the country's reliance on Germany as well as deprived the nation of large numbers of fighting men. Romania, relying on a Russian success during the conflict, was overrun by Austria-Hungary, Germany and Bulgaria shortly after Russia's defeat. With the armed forces of both Germany and Austria-Hungary losing confidence in their monarchs as a result of the engagement, and with its effective removal of Russia from the war, the battle of Kowel remains one of the most influential of the war.
