= Witoldów, Chełm County =

Witoldów
- Village
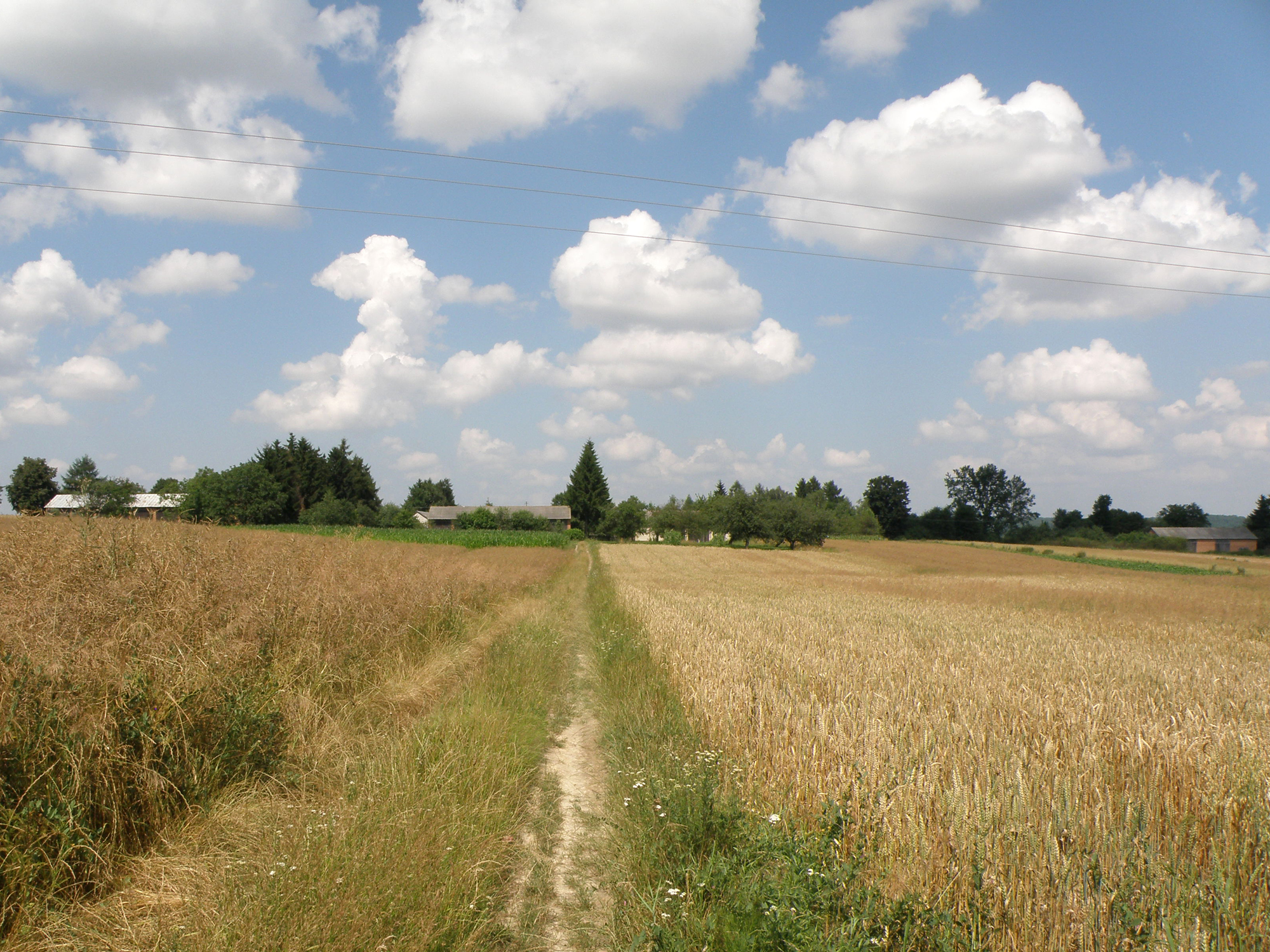

- Location within Poland
- Coordinates: 50°55′N 23°30′E
- Country: Poland
- Voivodeship: Lublin
- County: Chełm
- Gmina: Wojsławice

Witoldów (Polish pronunciation: [viˈtɔlduf]) is a village in the administrative district of Gmina Wojsławice, within Chełm County, Lublin Voivodeship, in eastern Poland.
