= Nowy Majdan, Chełm County =

Nowy Majdan
- Village
- Location within Poland
- Coordinates: 50°53′18″N 23°33′52″E
- Country: Poland
- Voivodeship: Lublin
- County: Chełm
- Gmina: Wojsławice

Nowy Majdan (Polish pronunciation: [ˈnɔvɨ ˈmajdan]) is a village in the administrative district of Gmina Wojsławice, within Chełm County, Lublin Voivodeship, in eastern Poland.
