= Majdan Kukawiecki =

- Village
- Location within Poland
- Coordinates: 50°54′N 23°29′E
- Country: Poland
- Voivodeship: Lublin
- County: Chełm
- Gmina: Wojsławice

Majdan Kukawiecki (Polish pronunciation: [ˈmajdaŋ kukaˈvjɛtskʲi]) is a village in the administrative district of Gmina Wojsławice, within Chełm County, Lublin Voivodeship, in eastern Poland.
