= Gmina Wojsławice =

Gmina Wojsławice Wojsławice Commune
- Gmina
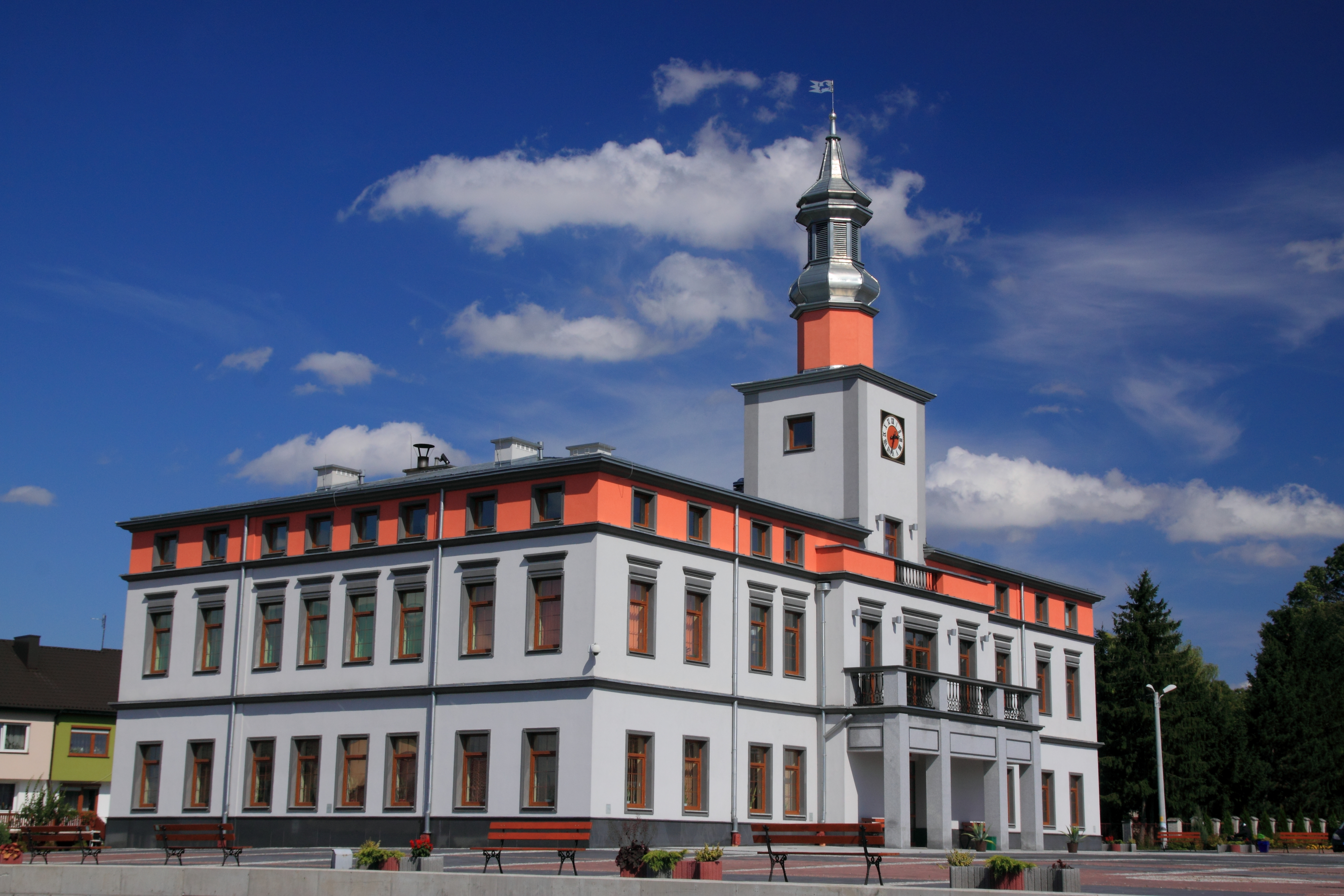

- Coat of arms

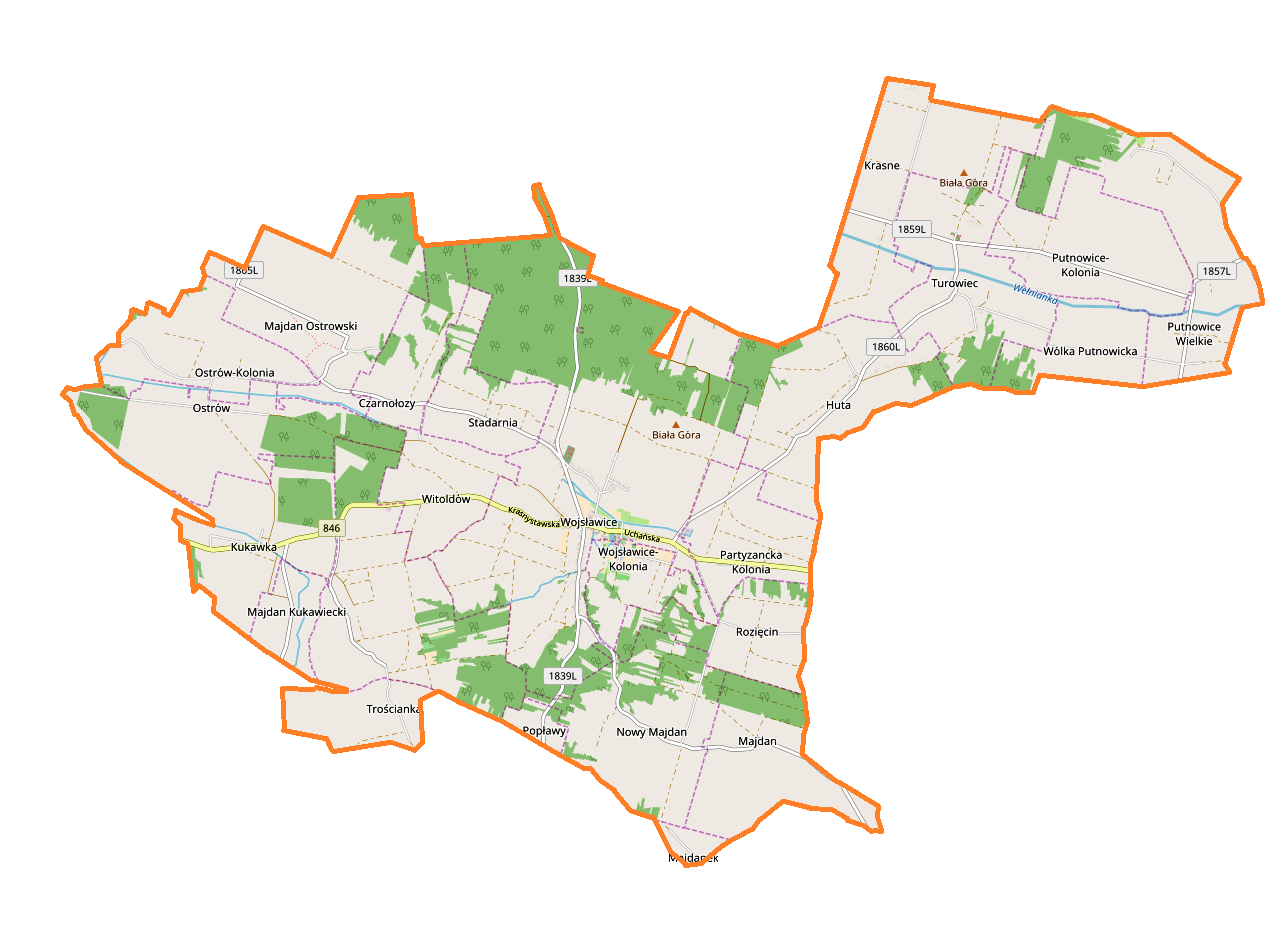
- Coordinates (Wojsławice): 50°55′9″N 23°32′48″E
- Country: Poland
- Voivodeship: Lublin
- County: Chełm County
- Seat: Wojsławice

Area
  - Total: 110.18 km^{2} (42.54 sq mi)

Population (2006)
  - Total: 4,267
  - Density: 38.73/km^{2} (100.3/sq mi)
- Website: http://www.wojslawice.lubelskie.pl

Gmina Wojsławice is a rural gmina (administrative district) in Chełm County, Lublin Voivodeship, in eastern Poland. Its seat is the village of Wojsławice, which lies approximately 26 kilometres (16 mi) south of Chełm and 78 km (48 mi) south-east of the regional capital Lublin.

The gmina covers an area of 110.18 square kilometres (42.5 sq mi), and as of 2006 its total population is 4,267.

== Villages ==
Gmina Wojsławice contains the villages and settlements of:

- Czarnołozy
- Cztery Słupy
- Góra Blachowa
- Góra Łosiów
- Góra Pudełkowa
- Huta
- Krasne
- Kukawka
- Majdan
- Majdan Kukawiecki
- Majdan Ostrowski
- Nowy Majdan
- Ostrów
- Ostrów-Kolonia
- Partyzancka Kolonia
- Pohulanka
- Popławy
- Przecinek
- Putnowice Wielkie
- Putnowice-Kolonia
- Rozięcin
- Stadarnia
- Stary Majdan
- Trościanka
- Turowiec
- Witoldów
- Wojsławice
- Wólka Putnowicka
- Zadebra

== Neighbouring gminas ==
Gmina Wojsławice is bordered by the gminas of Białopole, Grabowiec, Kraśniczyn, Leśniowice, Uchanie and Żmudź.
