= Czarnołozy =

- Village
- Location within Poland
- Coordinates: 50°56′N 23°30′E
- Country: Poland
- Voivodeship: Lublin
- County: Chełm
- Gmina: Wojsławice

Czarnołozy [t͡ʂarnɔˈwɔzɨ] is a village in the administrative district of Gmina Wojsławice, within Chełm County, Lublin Voivodeship, in eastern Poland.
