= Leopold Bürkner =

German naval officer

- Born: 29 January 1894; Zerbst, Anhalt, German Empire
- Died: 15 July 1975 (aged 81); Frankfurt, West Germany
- Military career
- Allegiance: German Empire; Weimar Republic; Nazi Germany
- Branch: Imperial German Navy; Reichsmarine; Kriegsmarine
- Service years: 1912–1945
- Rank: Vice Admiral
- Units: Admiral Scheer; Deutschland; Abwehr
- Commands: Emden
- Conflicts: World War I; Spanish Civil War; World War II

Leopold Bürkner (29 January 1894 - 15 July 1975) was a German naval officer who served on torpedo boats in World War I. In the post-war period he served on a pocket battleship that patrolled the Spanish coast during the Spanish Civil War and then commanded a light cruiser. In 1938 he became head of the foreign liaison section of the Abwehr, the General Staff intelligence department. During World War II he rose to the rank of Vice Admiral.

== Naval career ==
Leopold Bürkner was born on 29 January 1894 in Zerbst, Anhalt. He joined the Imperial navy on 1 April 1912. He undertook basic training on the heavy cruiser Hansa. From 1 April 1913 to 31 July 1914, he attended the Naval Academy, where he was appointed a midshipman.

From 1 August 1914 to 28 September 1915 Bürkner served in various capacities on the battleships SMS Wettin and SMS Schwaben and the battlecruisers SMS Seydlitz and SMS Moltke. On 22 March 1915 he became a lieutenant. From 29 September 1915 Bürkner was assigned to the Torpedo Boat Division. Bürkner was employed on various torpedo boats from 17 January 1916 until the end of the war. His last boat was SMS G39, which was scuttled on 21 June 1919 in Scapa Flow. Bürkner was taken captive and held until 29 January 1920.

Bürkner was cadet company commander at the Naval Academy Mürwik from 1 August 1920 to 26 September 1923. He was a flag lieutenant of the First Torpedo Boat Flotilla from 27 October 1923 to 25 September 1927. He then became a lecturer in the Education department of the Navy until 30 September 1931. Bürkner was chief of a half-flotilla of torpedo boats from October 1931 to September 1933. He was liaison officer for foreign naval attachés from 9 October 1933 to 30 September 1935. On 25 April 1935 he officially informed the British Naval attaché to Germany, Captain Gerard Muirhead-Gould, that Germany had laid down twelve 250-ton U-boats at Kiel.

Bürkner was First Officer on the newly commissioned pocket battleship Admiral Scheer from 1 October 1935 until 26 July 1937. In July 1936 the ship was sent to Spain to evacuate German civilians caught in the midst of the Spanish Civil War. From 8 August 1936 she served with her sister ship Deutschland on non-intervention patrols off the Republican-held coast of Spain. Deutschland was attacked on 29 May 1937 by Spanish Republican Air Force aircraft off Ibiza. In reprisal, on 31 May 1937 Admiral Scheer arrived off Almería and opened fire on shore batteries, naval installations and ships in the harbor. She returned to Wilhelmshaven on 1 July 1937. Bürkner commanded the Emden light cruiser from 30 July 1937 to 15 June 1938.

== Military intelligence ==
On 15 June 1938, Bürkner was appointed head of the foreign liaison section (Abteilung Ausland, later Amt Ausland) of the Abwehr, the intelligence organization of the German general staff.

The other four sections handled secret espionage abroad, sabotage, counterespionage and administration. Bürkner reported to Admiral Wilhelm Canaris, the head of the Abwehr, and was one of Canaris's closest collaborators.

After World War II began, Canaris was disgusted by the brutal executions conducted by the SS in Poland. He told Burkner that "a war conducted in contempt of all ethics cannot be won. There is a divine justice even on this earth". Later, Canaris was to try to stir up a revolt against Hitler.

In March 1941, Bürkner was involved in discussions concerning setting up a network of Arabs in Palestine to engage in sabotage and armed uprisings. This was to be done without consultation with the Italians to whom the Germans in the past had deferred on matters involving the Arabs.

After Canaris was removed from office in February 1944, Bürkner took temporary command of the Abwehr. In March 1944, he led the Abwehr representatives at a conference on creating a unified intelligence organization, combining the Abwehr with Amt VI, the foreign affairs unit of the SS's Sicherheitsdienst (SD) intelligence agency. Walter Schellenberg, Chief of Amt VI, favored forming a new Amt Mil office for purely-military intelligence, working closely with Amt VI.

Bürkner retained command of the residual organization. Canaris was later executed. Bürkner was briefly Chief of Protocol in the Dönitz Government after Hitler had killed himself.

== Post-war ==
The Dönitz government was arrested and dismissed by Allied troops on 23 May 1945 in Flensburg. Bürkner was imprisoned in Ansbach until 25 June 1947. While in captivity he was one of the former high-ranking officers of the armed forces who assisted in creating 2,500 military history studies. During the Nuremberg Trials he was called as a witness for Alfred Jodl. After his release he became director of the German staff of the Dutch airline KLM in Frankfurt. From 1949 he acted at times as an adviser to the Foreign Office. He was involved in the rearmament of West Germany.

Bürkner died on 15 July 1975 in Frankfurt. He was aged 81.

== Ranks ==
Bürkner held the following ranks:

- Fähnrich zur See (Midshipman) 12 April 1913
- Leutnant zur See (Sub-lieutenant) 22 March 1915
- Oberleutnant zur See (Lieutenant) 25 December 1917
- Kapitänleutnant (Lieutenant commander) 1 May 1924
- Korvettenkapitän (Commander - Junior grade) 1 October 1931
- Fregattenkapitän (Commander - Senior grade) 1 September 1936
- Kapitän zur See (Captain) 1 November 1937
- Konteradmiral(counter admiral) 1 April 1942
- Vizeadmiral (vice admiral) 1 October 1943

== Awards and decorations ==
- Iron Cross of 1914, 1st and 2nd class
- Friedrich Cross
- Honour Cross of the World War 1914/1918
- Officer's Cross of the Order of the Crown of Italy (2 August 1935)
- Wehrmacht Long Service Award, 4th to 1st class
- Order of the Sword, knight 1st class (Sweden, 30 April 1936)
- Commander of the Royal Order of Merit of Hungary (10 August 1938)
- Memel Medal
- Spanish Cross in Silver
- War Merit Cross (1939), 1st and 2nd class with Swords
- Order of the Cross of Liberty, 1st Class with Swords (Finland, 10 December 1941)
- Commander of the Order of the Star of Romania (7 October 1942)
- Knight's Cross of the War Merit Cross with Swords (2 May 1945)
