= Popławy, Chełm County =

Popławy
- Village
- Location within Poland
- Coordinates: 50°53′22″N 23°32′13″E
- Country: Poland
- Voivodeship: Lublin
- County: Chełm
- Gmina: Wojsławice

Popławy [pɔˈpwavɨ] is a village in the administrative district of Gmina Wojsławice, within Chełm County, Lublin Voivodeship, in eastern Poland.
