= Army Group Mackensen (Poland) =

Imperial German Army unit

The Army Group Mackensen (German: Heeresgruppe Mackensen, HGr. Mackensen) which operated in Poland between 22 April 1915 and 8 September 1915 during World War I under the command of Field Marshal August von Mackensen, was an army group of the Imperial German Army.

On 8 September 1915 it was renamed Army Group Linsingen when Alexander von Linsingen became its new commander. In June 1916, the Army Group faced the Brusilov Offensive. After an initial retreat, it checked the Russian advance at the Battle of Kowel. After the signing of the Treaty of Brest-Litovsk in March 1918, the Army Group occupied Ukraine.

On 31 March 1918, von Linsingen was replaced by Hermann von Eichhorn and the Army Group was dissolved; its troops merged into the Army Group Eichhorn-Kiev (German: Heeresgruppe Eichhorn-Kiew). It was again renamed on 3 April to Army Group Eichhorn and a last time on 13 August to Army Group Kiev after the murder of General Eichhorn. His successor was Günther von Kirchbach. The Army Group was disbanded on 7 February 1919.

== Composition April – September 1915 ==
- German Eleventh Army (August von Mackensen)
- Austro-Hungarian Fourth Army (Archduke Joseph Ferdinand of Austria)
- Austro-Hungarian Second Army (Eduard von Böhm-Ermolli), from June 1915
- German Army of the Bug (Alexander von Linsingen), from 8 July 1915

== Composition September 1915 – March 1918 ==
- Austro-Hungarian Fourth Army (Archduke Joseph Ferdinand of Austria, succeeded by Karl Tersztyánszky von Nádas)
- German Bug Army (Alexander von Linsingen)
