= Cztery Słupy =

- Village
- Location within Poland
- Coordinates: 50°58′16″N 23°36′52″E
- Country: Poland
- Voivodeship: Lublin
- County: Chełm
- Gmina: Wojsławice

Cztery Słupy [ˈt͡ʂtɛrɨ ˈswupɨ] is a village in the administrative district of Gmina Wojsławice, within Chełm County, Lublin Voivodeship, in eastern Poland.
