= Ostrów-Kolonia, Chełm County =

Ostrów-Kolonia
- Village
- Location within Poland
- Coordinates: 50°56′28″N 23°28′4″E
- Country: Poland
- Voivodeship: Lublin
- County: Chełm
- Gmina: Wojsławice

Population
  - Total: 110

Ostrów-Kolonia [ˈɔstruf kɔˈlɔɲa] is a village in the administrative district of Gmina Wojsławice, within Chełm County, Lublin Voivodeship, in eastern Poland.
