= Przecinek, Lublin Voivodeship =

Przecinek
- Village
- Location within Poland
- Coordinates: 50°57′6″N 23°41′9″E
- Country: Poland
- Voivodeship: Lublin
- County: Chełm
- Gmina: Wojsławice

Przecinek [pʂɛˈt͡ɕinɛk] is a village in the administrative district of Gmina Wojsławice, within Chełm County, Lublin Voivodeship, in eastern Poland.
