= Majdan, Gmina Wojsławice =

Majdan
- Village
- Location within Poland
- Coordinates: 50°53′15″N 23°35′20″E
- Country: Poland
- Voivodeship: Lublin
- County: Chełm
- Gmina: Wojsławice

Majdan (Polish pronunciation: [ˈmajdan]) is a village in the administrative district of Gmina Wojsławice, within Chełm County, Lublin Voivodeship, in eastern Poland.
