= Góra Łosiów =

- Village
- Location within Poland
- Coordinates: 50°54′19″N 23°29′41″E
- Country: Poland
- Voivodeship: Lublin
- County: Chełm
- Gmina: Wojsławice

Góra Łosiów [ˈɡura ˈwɔɕuf] is a village in the administrative district of Gmina Wojsławice, within Chełm County, Lublin Voivodeship, in eastern Poland.
