= Ostrów, Gmina Wojsławice =

Ostrów
- Village
- Location within Poland
- Coordinates: 50°56′10″N 23°27′44″E
- Country: Poland
- Voivodeship: Lublin
- County: Chełm
- Gmina: Wojsławice

Population
  - Total: 160

Ostrów [ˈɔstruf] is a village in the administrative district of Gmina Wojsławice, within Chełm County, Lublin Voivodeship, in eastern Poland.
