= Rozięcin =

- Village
- Location within Poland
- Coordinates: 50°54′N 23°35′E
- Country: Poland
- Voivodeship: Lublin
- County: Chełm
- Gmina: Wojsławice

Rozięcin [rɔˈʑɛnt͡ɕin] is a village in the administrative district of Gmina Wojsławice, within Chełm County, Lublin Voivodeship, in eastern Poland.
