= Turowiec, Lublin Voivodeship =

Turowiec
- Village
- Location within Poland
- Coordinates: 50°57′N 23°38′E
- Country: Poland
- Voivodeship: Lublin
- County: Chełm
- Gmina: Wojsławice

Turowiec [tuˈrɔvʲɛt͡s] is a village in the administrative district of Gmina Wojsławice, within Chełm County, Lublin Voivodeship, in eastern Poland.
