= Wolica (river) =

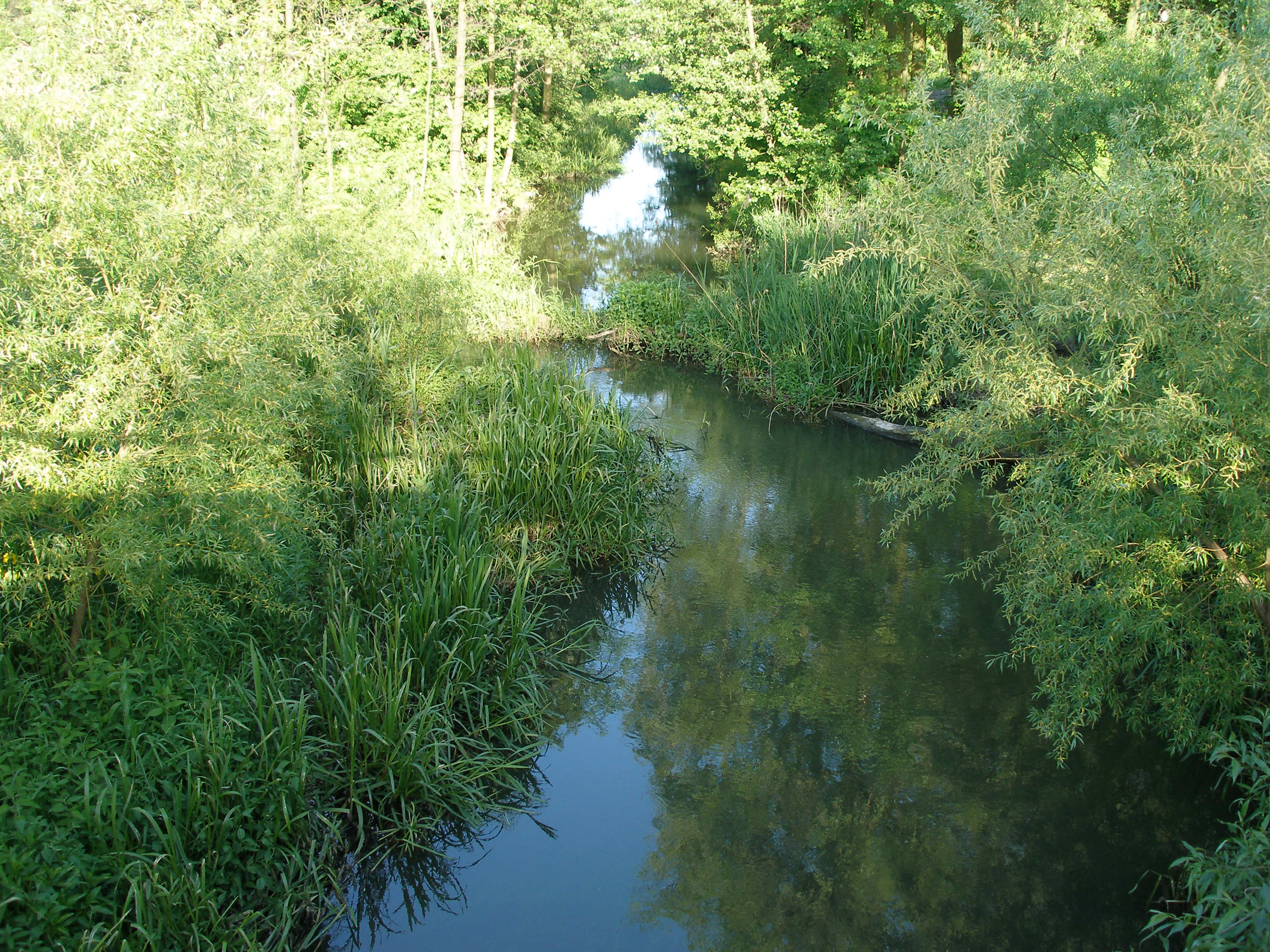
- Wolica in Skierbieszów

Location
- Country: Poland
- Voivodeship: Lublin

Physical characteristics
- Source
  - location: near Trościanka, Chełm County
  - coordinates: 50°53′30″N 23°30′19″E
  - elevation: 300 m (980 ft)
- Mouth: Wieprz
  - location: east of Dworzyska, Krasnystaw County
  - coordinates: 50°56′08″N 23°10′03″E
  - elevation: 179.6 m (589 ft)
- Length: 47 km (29 mi)

Basin features
- Progression: Wieprz→ Vistula→ Baltic Sea

Wolica is a river of Poland, a tributary of the Wieprz south of Krasnystaw.
