= Putnowice-Kolonia =

- Village
- Location within Poland
- Coordinates: 50°57′15″N 23°40′24″E
- Country: Poland
- Voivodeship: Lublin
- County: Chełm
- Gmina: Wojsławice

Putnowice-Kolonia [putnɔˈvit͡sɛ kɔˈlɔɲa] is a village in the administrative district of Gmina Wojsławice, within Chełm County, Lublin Voivodeship, in eastern Poland.
