= Partyzancka Kolonia =

- Village
- Location within Poland
- Coordinates: 50°54′49″N 23°34′58″E
- Country: Poland
- Voivodeship: Lublin
- County: Chełm
- Gmina: Wojsławice

Population
  - Total: 150

Partyzancka Kolonia [partɨˈzant͡ska kɔˈlɔɲa] is a village in the administrative district of Gmina Wojsławice, within Chełm County, Lublin Voivodeship, in eastern Poland.
