= Stadarnia =

- Village
- Location within Poland
- Coordinates: 50°55′53″N 23°32′14″E
- Country: Poland
- Voivodeship: Lublin
- County: Chełm
- Gmina: Wojsławice

Stadarnia [staˈdarɲa] is a village in the administrative district of Gmina Wojsławice, within Chełm County, Lublin Voivodeship, in eastern Poland.
