= Krasne, Gmina Wojsławice =

Krasne
- Village
- Location within Poland
- Coordinates: 50°58′29″N 23°37′19″E
- Country: Poland
- Voivodeship: Lublin
- County: Chełm
- Gmina: Wojsławice

Krasne [ˈkrasnɛ] is a village in the administrative district of Gmina Wojsławice, within Chełm County, Lublin Voivodeship, in eastern Poland.
