= SMS G39 =

Imperial German Navy torpedo boat

History

German Empire
- Ordered: 1914 Peacetime order
- Builder: Germaniawerft, Kiel, Germany
- Launched: 16 January 1915
- Commissioned: 20 August 1915
- Fate: Interned at Scapa Flow 22 November 1918; Scuttled at Scapa Flow 21 January 1919

General characteristics
- Displacement: 1,051 tonnes
- Length: 79.5 meters
- Beam: 8.33 m
- Draft: 3.74 m (fwd); 3.45 meters (aft)
- Speed: 34.5 knots (63.9 km/h)
- Range: 1,100 nautical miles at 20 knots; (2,040 km at 37 km/h)
- Complement: 83 officers and sailors
- Armament: 3 × 8.8 cm (3.5 in) SK L/45 guns; 6 × 500 mm torpedo tubes; 24 mines

SMS G39 was a 1913 Type Large Torpedo Boat (Großes Torpedoboot) of the Imperial German Navy (Kaiserliche Marine) during World War I, and the 15th ship of its class.

== Construction ==
Built by Germaniawerft in Kiel, Germany, she was commissioned in August 1915. The "G" in G39 refers to the shipyard at which she was constructed.

== Service ==
G39 was assigned to the High Seas Fleet of the Kaiserliche Marine when she participated in the Battle of Jutland. She served as the leader of the First Torpedo Boat Flotilla in this action under the command of Commander Conrad Albrecht. Admiral Hipper transferred from Lützow to G39 during the Battle of Jutland prior to his transfer to the Moltke.

After the end of hostilities, G39, as a part of the 1st Torpedo Half Flotilla under Kapitänleutnant Reinhold Henrici (SMS G. 38, SMS G. 39, SMS G. 40, SMS G. 86 and SMS V. 129), was interned at Scapa Flow and scuttled. One of the crew members on her last voyage was Leopold Bürkner, who later became head of foreign affairs intelligence during the Third Reich. He was interned until 29 January 1920.

The boat was salvaged by Ernest Cox on 3 July 1925.

== See also ==
- Scuttling of the German fleet at Scapa Flow
