= Army of the Bug =

Bugarmee Army of the Bug
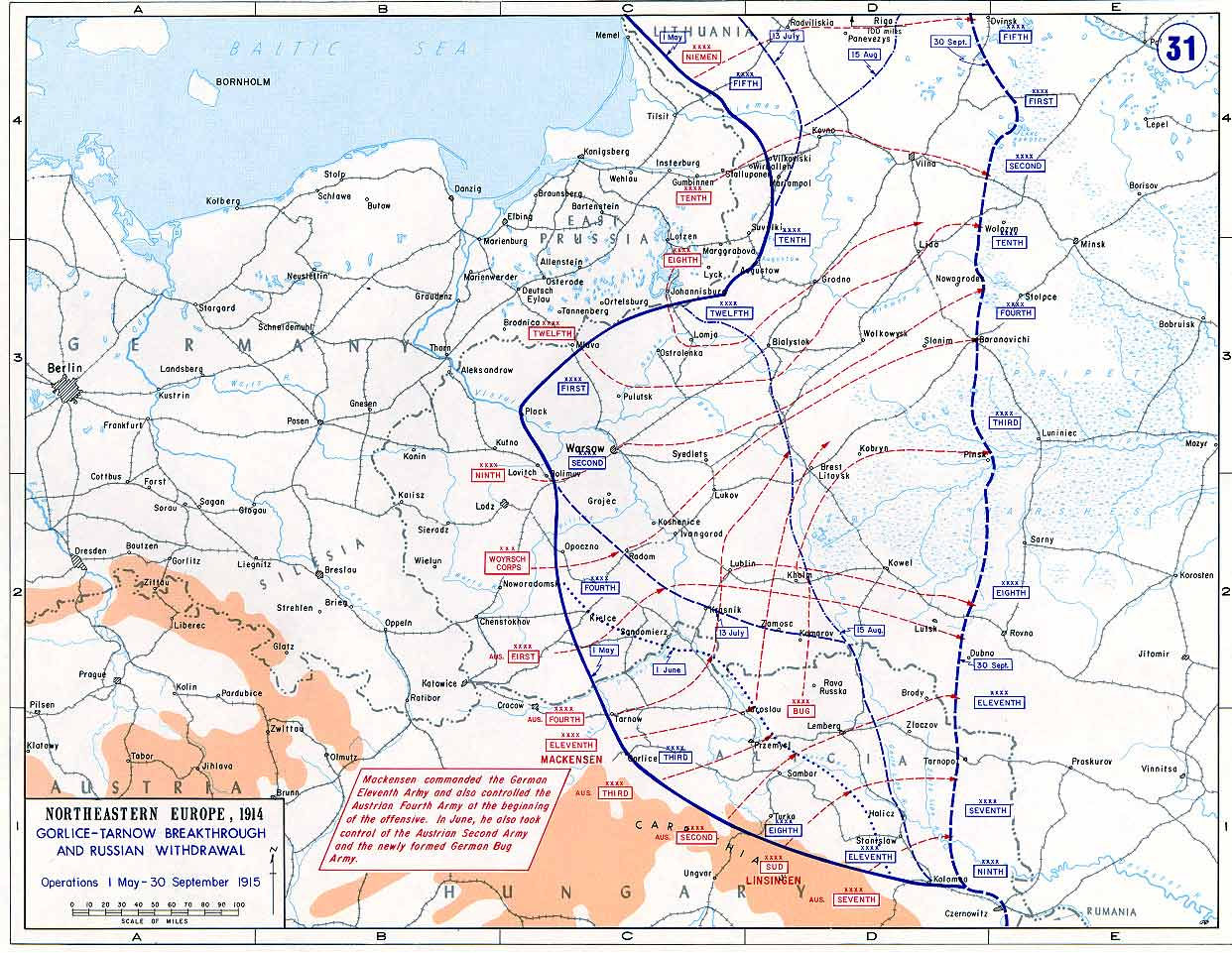
- Eastern Front in the second half of 1915.
- Active: 8 July 1915 – 31 March 1918
- Country: German Empire
- Type: Army
- Engagements: World War I

Insignia
- Abbreviation: A.O.K. Bug

The Army of the Bug (German: Bugarmee / Armeeoberkommando Bug / A.O.K. Bug) was an army level command of the German Army in World War I named for the Bug River. It was formed against Russia on 8 July 1915 and served exclusively on the Eastern Front. It was dissolved on 31 March 1918.

== History ==
The Army of the Bug was formed on 8 July 1915 by renaming the previous South Army with headquarters in Lemberg. After the commander, General der Infanterie Alexander von Linsingen, had been appointed to simultaneous command of Heeresgruppe Linsingen on 20 September 1915, the Army of the Bug was split into Armee-Gruppen that were under the direct command of the Heeresgruppe. At various times, these included

Armee-Gruppe Gronau (formerly XXXXI Reserve Corps) 20 September 1915 – 18 September 1916 (then raised to the status of an Armee-Abteilung)
Armee-Gruppe Marwitz (formerly VI Corps) 15 June 1916 – 22 August 1917
Armee-Gruppe Litzmann (formerly XXXX Reserve Corps) 28 July 1916 – 28 January 1918

The dissolution of the last of these on 28 January 1918 marked the end of the Army of the Bug as well.

== Commanders ==
The Army of the Bug was commanded throughout its existence by General der Infanterie Alexander von Linsingen (previously commander of South Army). Linsingen was simultaneously commander of Heeresgruppe Linsingen from 20 September 1915 and remained its commander when the Army of the Bug was disbanded.

== Glossary ==
- Armee-Abteilung or Army Detachment in the sense of "something detached from an Army". It is not under the command of an Army so is in itself a small Army.
- Armee-Gruppe or Army Group in the sense of a group within an Army and under its command, generally formed as a temporary measure for a specific task.
- Heeresgruppe or Army Group in the sense of a number of armies under a single commander.

== See also ==
- Great Retreat (Russian)
- Vistula–Bug offensive

== Bibliography ==
- Cron, Hermann (2002). Imperial German Army 1914–18: Organisation, Structure, Orders-of-Battle [first published: 1937]. Helion & Co. ISBN 1-874622-70-1.
- Ellis, John; Cox, Michael (1993). The World War I Databook. Aurum Press Ltd. ISBN 1-85410-766-6.
