= Putnowice Wielkie =

- Village
- Location within Poland
- Coordinates: 50°57′20″N 23°41′27″E
- Country: Poland
- Voivodeship: Lublin
- County: Chełm
- Gmina: Wojsławice
- Time zone: UTC+1 (CET)
  - Summer (DST): UTC+2 (CEST)

Putnowice Wielkie [putnɔˈvit͡sɛ ˈvjɛlkʲɛ] is a village in the administrative district of Gmina Wojsławice, within Chełm County, Lublin Voivodeship, in eastern Poland.

== History ==
18 Polish citizens were murdered by Nazi Germany in the village during World War II.
