= South Army (German Empire) =

Südarmee South Army
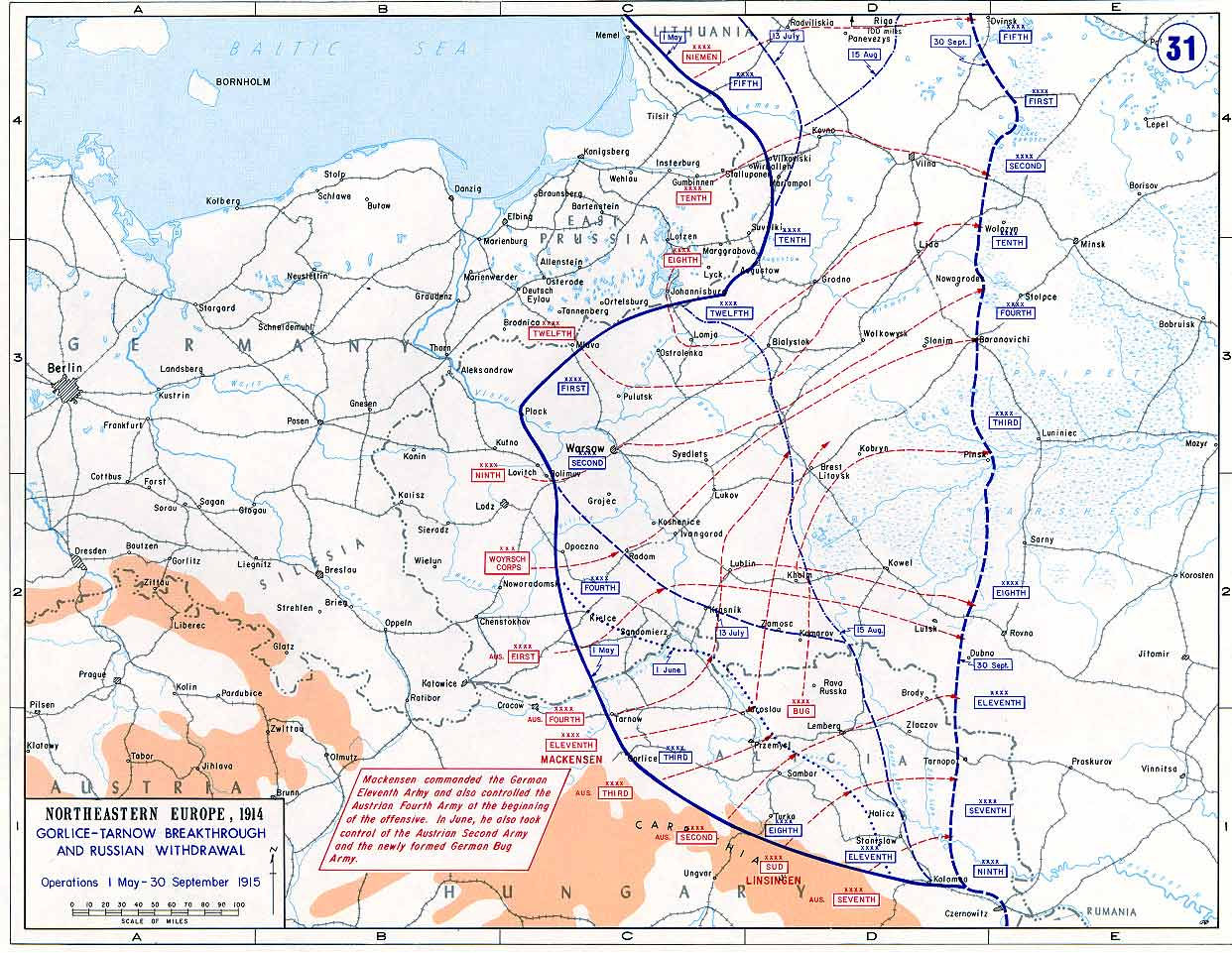
- Eastern Front in the second half of 1915.
- Active: 11 January 1915 – 25 January 1918
- Country: German Empire
- Type: Army
- Engagements: World War I Eastern Front Brusilov Offensive Kerensky Offensive

Insignia
- Abbreviation: A.O.K. Süd

The South Army (German: Südarmee / Armeeoberkommando Süd / A.O.K. Süd) was an army level command of the German Army in World War I. It was formed on 11 January 1915 to fight against Russia and served exclusively on the Eastern Front. It was dissolved on 25 January 1918.

== History ==
The South Army was formed in Breslau, on 11 January 1915, by the transformation of II Corps for the Hungarian Carpathian Front. II Corps commander, General der Infanterie Alexander von Linsingen took over the new army command. On 8 July 1915, von Linsingen transferred as commander of the new Army of the Bug. In his place, General der Infanterie Felix Graf von Bothmer of II Bavarian Reserve Corps took command of the South Army. With the Russians withdrawing from the war (Treaty of Brest-Litovsk) and the run down of German forces on the Eastern Front, the army was dissolved on 25 January 1918.

The headquarters of the army was located in Mukachevo (from 11 January 1915), Stryi (from 5 June 1915), Berezhany (from 4 September 1915), Khodoriv (from 15 November 1916) and Chortkiv (from 4 August 1917).

== Commanders ==
The South Army had the following commanders during its existence:

8th Army
From	Commander	Previously	Subsequently
11 January 1915	General der Infanterie Alexander von Linsingen	II Corps	Army of the Bug
8 July 1915	General der Infanterie Felix Graf von Bothmer	II Bavarian Reserve Corps	19th Army

== Glossary ==
- Armee-Abteilung, or Army Detachment, in the sense of "something detached from an Army". It is not under the command of an Army, so is, in itself, a small Army.
- Armee-Gruppe, or Army Group, in the sense of a group within an Army and under its command, generally formed as a temporary measure for a specific task.
- Heeresgruppe, or Army Group, in the sense of a number of armies under a single commander.

== See also ==
- Great Retreat (Russian)

== Bibliography ==
- Cron, Hermann (2002). Imperial German Army 1914–18: Organisation, Structure, Orders-of-Battle [first published: 1937]. Helion & Co. ISBN 1-874622-70-1.
- Ellis, John; Cox, Michael (1993). The World War I Databook. Aurum Press Ltd. ISBN 1-85410-766-6.
