= Trościanka =

- Village
- Location within Poland
- Coordinates: 50°53′34″N 23°30′12″E
- Country: Poland
- Voivodeship: Lublin
- County: Chełm
- Gmina: Wojsławice

Trościanka [trɔɕˈt͡ɕaŋka] is a village in the administrative district of Gmina Wojsławice, within Chełm County, Lublin Voivodeship, in eastern Poland.
