= Alexander von Linsingen =

German general (1850–1935)

- Born: 10 February 1850; Hildesheim, Kingdom of Hanover
- Died: 5 June 1935 (aged 85); Hannover, Nazi Germany
- Military career
- Allegiance: German Empire
- Service years: 1868–1918
- Rank: Generaloberst
- Commands: 4th (3rd East Prussian) Grenadiers "King Frederick the Great"; 81st Infantry Brigade; 27th Division; II Corps; South Army; Army of the Bug; Heeresgruppe Linsingen
- Conflicts: World War I First Battle of the Marne First Battle of Ypres Brusilov Offensive Battle of Kowel
- Awards: Pour le Mérite with Oak Leaves

Alexander Adolf August Karl von Linsingen (10 February 1850 – 5 June 1935) was a German general during World War I.

== Military service ==
Linsingen joined the Prussian Army in 1868 and rose to Corps Commander (II Corps) in 1909. He was one of the very few top German generals not to have served on the general staff.

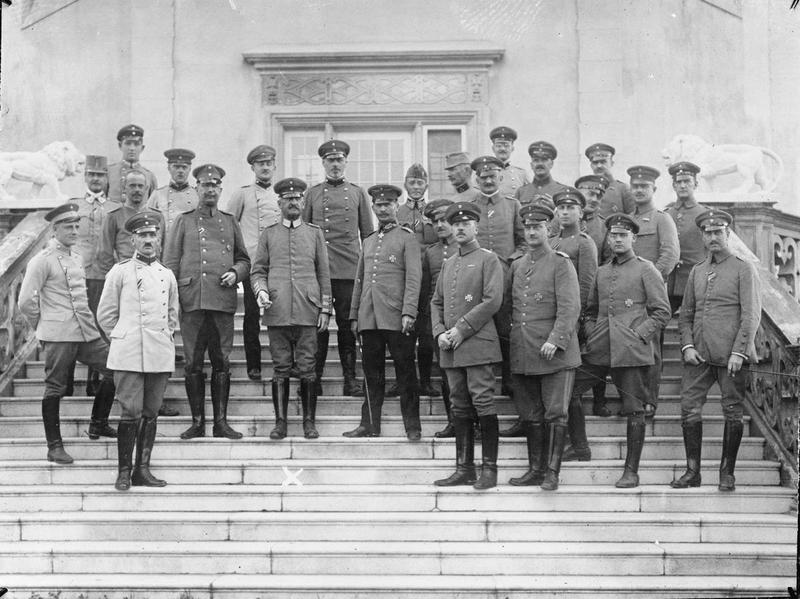
General von Linsingen and Staff. Army and army group Commander on Russian Front.

At the beginning of World War I, Linsingen was a Corps commander in the First Battle of the Marne. Transferred to the Eastern Front where German and Austrian armies were threatened by a Russian offensive in Galicia, Linsingen took command of South Army (1915). He defeated the Russian armies in the Battle of Stryi in 1915, capturing 60,000 Russian prisoners. He was awarded the Pour le Mérite on 14 May 1915 and the Oakleaves (for a second award) on 3 July 1915.

In 1915, he took command of the Army of the Bug and was concurrently commander of Heeresgruppe Linsingen. In June 1916, his Army Group faced the Brusilov offensive. After an initial retreat, he checked the Russian advance at the Battle of Kowel. He was promoted to Colonel-General, the second highest rank for a general in the Imperial German Army (4 stars). In 1917-1918 and especially after the signing of the Treaty of Brest-Litovsk, he led the German advance into Ukraine.

On 31 March 1918, his Army Group was disbanded and von Linsingen became the Military Governor of Berlin (June 1918). Alexander von Linsingen died on 5 June 1935 and is interred at the Neuen St. Nikolai-Friedhof in Hannover, Germany.

== Decorations and awards ==
- Iron Cross of 1870, 2nd class
- Order of the Crown, 2nd class with Star (Prussia)
- Knight of Justice of the Order of Saint John (Bailiwick of Brandenburg)
- Service Award (Prussia)
- Commander 2nd Class of the Order of Albert the Bear (Anhalt)
- Knight's Cross 2nd Class of the Order of the Zähringer Lion with Oak Leaves (Baden)
- Military Merit Order, 2nd class with Star (Bavaria)
- Grand Cross with Gold Crown in the House Order of the Wendish Crown (Mecklenburg)
- Grand Commanders Cross of the Order of the Griffon (Mecklenburg)
- Grand Cross of the Friedrich Order
- Commander Grand Cross of the Order of the Sword (1911)
- Iron Cross of 1914, 1st class
- Grand Cross of the Royal Hungarian Order of Saint Stephen (1915)
- Pour le Mérite (14 May 1915); Oak Leaves added on 3 July 1915
- Order of the Black Eagle (27 January 1917)
- Grand Cross of the Order of the Red Eagle with Swords (27 January 1917)

== Glossary ==
- Armee-Abteilung or Army Detachment in the sense of "something detached from an Army". It is not under the command of an Army so is in itself a small Army.
- Armee-Gruppe or Army Group in the sense of a group within an Army and under its command, generally formed as a temporary measure for a specific task.
- Heeresgruppe or Army Group in the sense of a number of armies under a single commander.

== Bibliography ==
- Cron, Hermann (2002). Imperial German Army 1914-18: Organisation, Structure, Orders-of-Battle [first published: 1937]. Helion & Co. ISBN 1-874622-70-1.

Military offices
| Preceded by General der Infanterie Josias von Heeringen | Commander, II Corps; 1 September 1909 - 10 January 1915 | Succeeded by Upgraded to South Army |
| Preceded by New Formation | Commander, South Army; 11 January 1915 - 8 July 1915 | Succeeded by General der Infanterie Felix Graf von Bothmer |
| Preceded by New Formation | Commander, Army of the Bug; 8 July 1915 - 31 March 1918 | Succeeded by Dissolved |
| Preceded by Heeresgruppe Mackensen | Commander, Heeresgruppe Linsingen; 9 September 1915 - 31 March 1918 | Succeeded by Heeresgruppe Eichhorn-Kiew |
