= Vladimir Bezobrazov (soldier) =

Russian general (1857–1932)

Vladimir Mikhailovich Bezobrazov
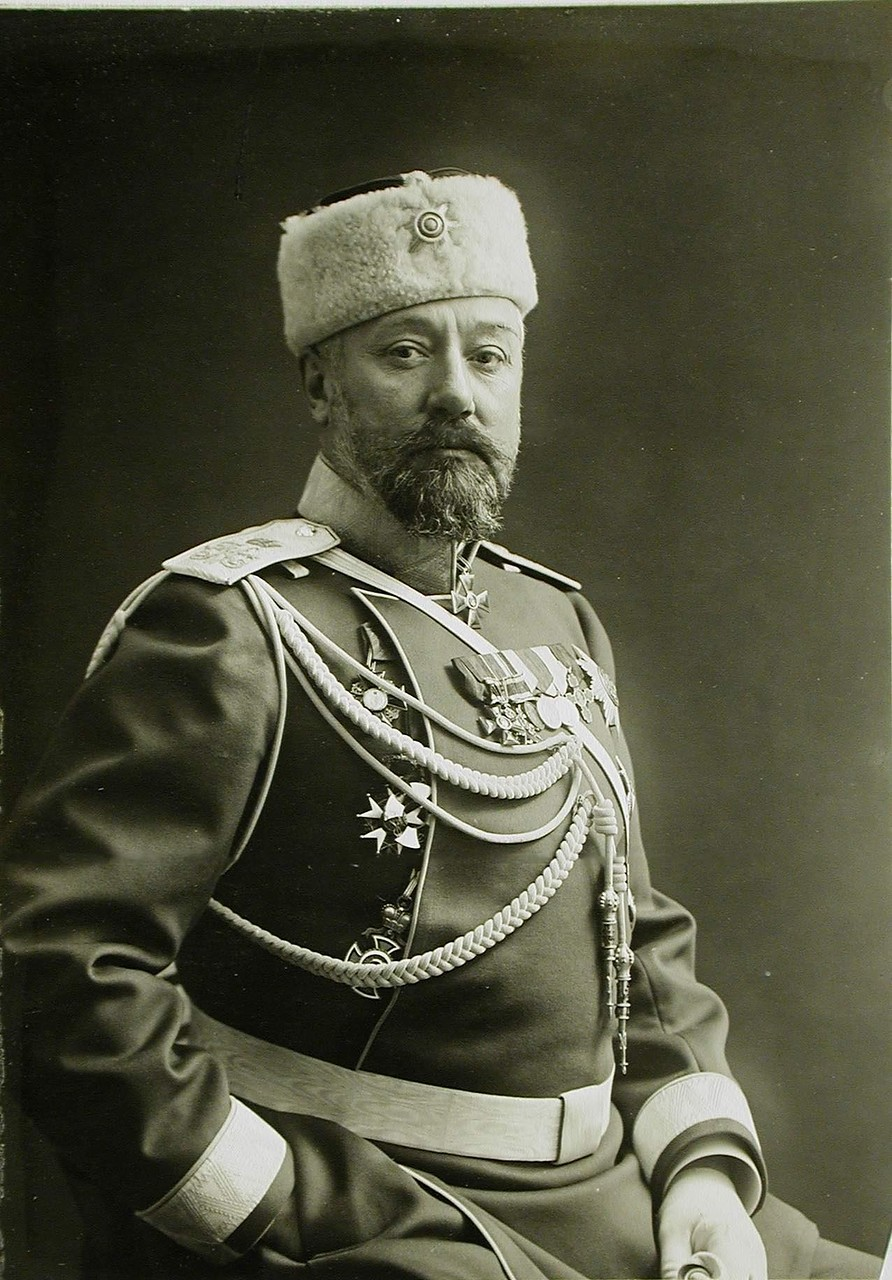
- Born: 1857; Saint Petersburg, Russian Empire
- Died: 1932 (aged 74–75) Nice, France
- Allegiance: Russian Empire
- Branch: Imperial Russian Army
- Commands: 1st Guards Corps
- Conflicts: Russo-Turkish War; World War I

Vladimir Mikhailovich Bezobrazov (Russian: Влади́мир Миха́йлович Безобра́зов; 1857 – 1932) was a Russian military leader from the Bezobrazov family, general from the cavalry, adjutant general. From 1915 to 1916 he was commander of the Guard.

== Biography ==
The younger brother of the Secretary of State A. Mikhailovich Bezobrazov. Grandson of General G.I. Nostits and Senator A.M. Bezobrazov, great-grandson of Count F.G. Orlov. Born in St. Petersburg, was baptized on February 10, 1857, in the Simeonovskaya church on Mokhovaya with the perception of his grandfather A. M. Bezobrazov and aunt M. A. Shelashnikova.

=== Achievement list ===
- 1877 - Graduated from the Page Corps. Released as a cornet to the 8th Lancers of the Ascension Regiment, with a secondment to the Life Guards Hussars Regiment.
- He participated in the Russo-Turkish War (1877-1878).
- September 8, 1896 - Commander of the 9th Lancers of the Bug Regiment.
- May 30, 1900 - Commander of the Cavalier Guard regiment with the rank of colonel.
- July 22, 1900 - Major General.
- April 6, 1904 - Commander of the 1st Brigade of the 1st Guards Cavalry Division (Russian Empire).
- November 6, 1906 - Head of the Officer Cavalry School.
- January 5, 1909 - Head of the 2nd Guards Cavalry Division (Russian Empire).
- January 29, 1912 - Commander of the Guards Corps (as part of the 1st and 2nd Guards Infantry Divisions, the Guards Rifle Brigade).
- April 14, 1913 - cavalry general.
- August 1914 - The corps became part of the 1st Army of General Paul von Rennenkampf in East Prussia.
- August 1914 - The corps was transferred to the 4th Army of General A.E. Evert.
- August 26–27, 1914 - In the battles of Targavka, he defeated the German group of General R. von Wojrsch and the X Austro-Hungarian Corps. He was awarded the St. George arms

“Because, having received the order to take possession of the strongly fortified positions of the enemy at the village Kosarzhev and on the front of. Eziorki-f. Dombrovki, occupied by him after a failed round of our left flank, secured from the right flank of the swamps of the river. Steam and giving the enemy the opportunity to fire cross-section artillery, rifle and machine gun fire, our attacking units, with excellent courage, order and stamina, fought stubborn battles from 23 to 27 Aug. 1914 inclusive, ending with the complete defeat of the enemy, who began to quickly retreat, throwing guns and surrendering in the hundreds, more than 60 officers and more than 3,000 lower ranks were taken prisoner in these battles."

- November 8, 1914 - During the Czestochowa-Krakow operation, he liquidated the resulting breakthrough of the enemy at the junction of the 4th and 9th armies.
- December 15, 1914 - Adjutant General.
- 1915 - The corps was transferred to the 12th Army.
- June 1915 - The corps was transferred to the 3rd Army of General L.V. Lesha.
- 3-5 July 1915 - Defeated the Prussian Guard during the Battle of Krasnosostav.
- August 25, 1915 - Transferred to the Supreme Commander.
- November 26, 1915 - Commander of the Guards detachment, consisting of two guards infantry corps and the guards cavalry corps (at the personal choice of Nicholas II).
- November 1915 - In preparation for the advance of the Northern Front, the detachment is concentrated at Volochisk.
- June 2, 1916 - Commander of the Guard.
- June 26, 1916 - The detachment was transferred to the South-Western Front of General A. A. Brusilov.
- July 6, 1916 - A detachment advanced between the 3rd and 8th armies with the task of crossing the river Stokhod and attack Kovel from the south. To fulfill the task, Bezobrazov was subordinated to the I and XXX army corps and V cavalry corps.
- July 15, 1916 - He went on the offensive, having achieved private success. The 2nd Guards Corps defeated the group of General Baron V. von Lutwitz (reinforced X Army Corps) at Tresten and Voronchin. In total, the Bezobrazov group took about 20.5 thousand prisoners (including two generals) and captured 56 guns.
- July 26, 1916 - Started a repeated unsuccessful attack on Kovel.
- July 27, 1916 - Made an unsuccessful attempt to attack Vitonezh with the forces of the 2nd Guards Infantry Corps.
- July 30, 1916 - The Army Group was transferred to the Western Front and officially renamed the Special Army.
- August 14, 1916 - Bezobrazov removed from command.
- During the February Revolution he was in Petrograd. On February 28, 1917, he arrived at General S.S. Khabalov and demanded decisive measures to suppress the unrest, he pointed to the Tauride Palace, where at that time the Council of Workers 'and Soldiers' Deputies was already sitting as the center for leading the uprising.

“A little sovereign had such, with all his heart and soul of his loving, selflessly devoted to him, subjects. That’s why Bezobrazov removed, in advance of the revolution, his connection with the guard (F. Vinberg)."

After the revolution he emigrated to France. He died in Nice.

General Bezobrazov was one of the fifteen founders of the Imperial Russian Automobile Society, which was created on May 15, 1903, at the initiative of motorist P. P. Beckel. At the first meeting of the company, Bezobrazov was elected chairman of the Committee of the Company.

== Family ==
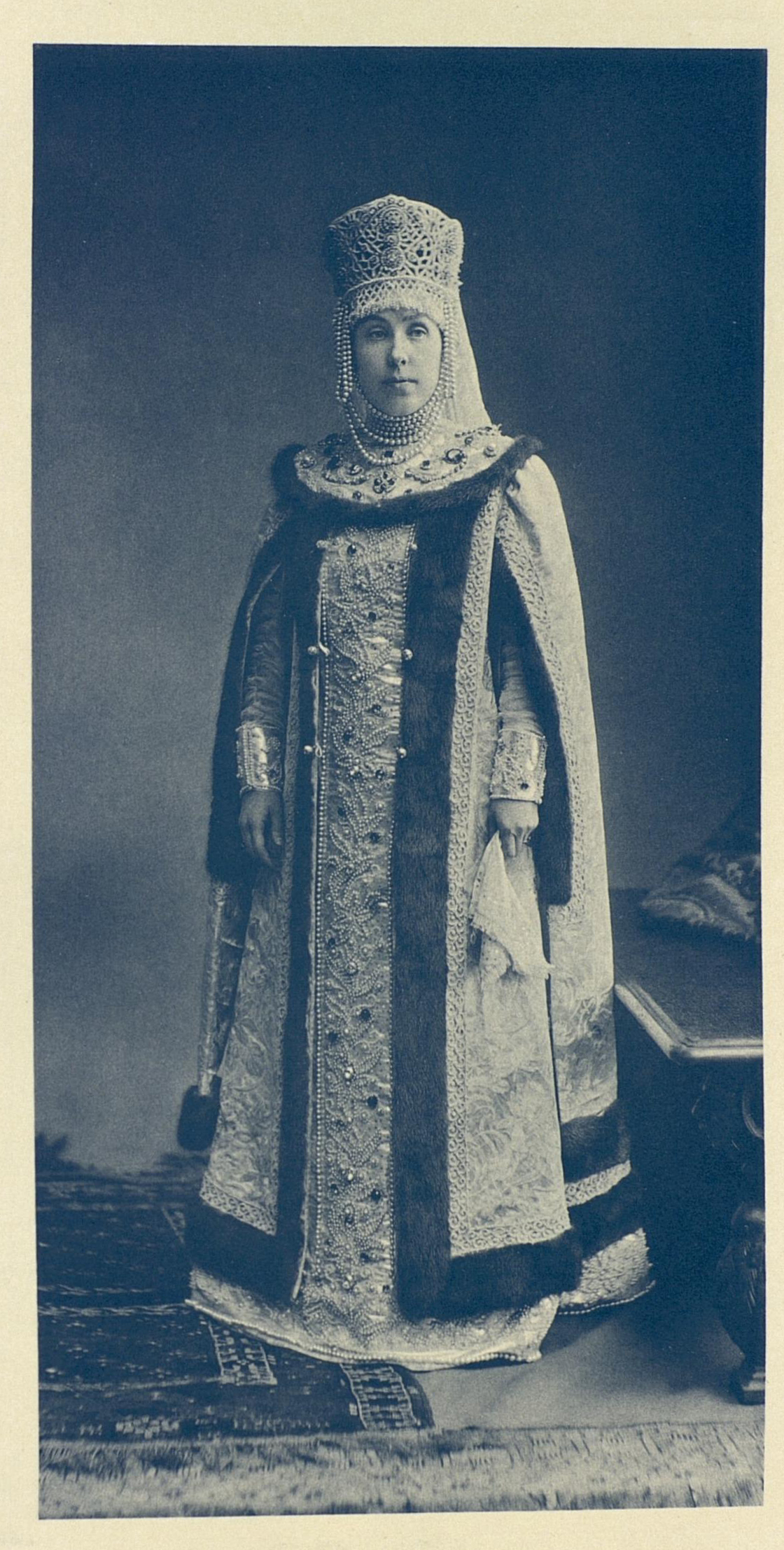
Nadezhda Vladimirovna Steinbock-Fermor (Bezobrazova)

He was married to Countess Nadezhda Vladimirovna Stenbock-Fermor (1871-1944), maid of honor of the court (1891), daughter of Count Vladimir Alexandrovich Stenbock-Fermor (1849-1897) from his marriage with Evdokia Ivanovna Apraksina (1850-1875). Died in exile in Nice. They had nine children - Vladimir, Nadezhda, Evdokia, Mikhail, Olga, George, Elizabeth, Maria, Irina.

== Military ranks ==
- Cornet (01.24.1877)
- Lieutenant (08.30.1880)
- Head Captain (04/08/1884)
- Captain (04.24.1888)
- Polkovnik (08/30/1891)
- Major General (07/22/1900)
- Lieutenant General (04.22.1907)
- General of the cavalry (04/14/1913)

== Awards ==
- Order of St. Anne of the 4th degree (1878)
- Order of St. Stanislav 3rd degree with swords and bow (1878)
- Order of St. Anne of the 3rd degree (1885)
- Order of St. Stanislav 2nd degree (1889)
- Order of St. Anne of the 2nd degree (1893)
- Order of St. Vladimir 4th degree (1900)
- Order of St. Stanislav 1st degree (1905)
- Order of St. Anne 1st degree (1910)
- Order of St. Vladimir, 2nd degree (1913)
- Order of St. George 4th degree (VP 22.10.1914)
- St. George's Arms (VP 30.01.1915)

=== Foreign ===
- Montenegrin Order of Prince Daniel I, 3rd Art. (1889)
- French Legion of Honor, Commander's Cross (1901)

Preceded by Vladimir Danilov	Commander of the 1st Guards Corps; 1912–1915	Succeeded by Vladimir Apollonovich Olokhov

== Literature ==
- Zalessky K. A. Who was who in the First World War. - M .: AST; Astrel, 2003 .-- 896 p. - 5,000 copies. - ISBN 5-17-019670-9 (ACT); ISBN 5-271-06895-1 (Astrel).

== Works ==
- Vladimir Mikhailovich Bezobrazov. Diary of the Commander of the Russian Imperial Guard 1914—1917. Edited by Marvin Lyons. Boynton Beach, FL, Dramco Publishers. 1994.
