= Pan Samochodzik =

Fictional character

Pan Samochodzik (Polish for 'Mister Automobile', also known as Tomasz N.N.) is a fictional art historian, journalist, renowned adventurer and historical detective created by Polish writer Zbigniew Nienacki. He is a main character in a series of adventures centering on historical mysteries and treasures. As a museum and government employee, Pan Samochodzik not only has to discover treasures, but protect them from thieves. His nickname comes from his fantastic (heavily customized) automobile.

== Characters ==
=== Pan Samochodzik ===
Pan Samochodzik, a.k.a. Tomasz N.N., is an employee of the fictional Department of Artifact Protection in the Polish Ministry of Culture and Art. He is a special envoy with extensive knowledge in the areas of history, riddle-solving, finding treasures and protecting them from thieves. As such, he is sometimes called a Polish version of Robert Langdon, Dirk Pitt or Indiana Jones.

His nickname, Pan Samochodzik (Polish for 'Mr. Automobile'; French (this version also appeared in one of the books): 'Monsieur La Bangnolette'), comes from his unique vehicle: a heavily modified by his uncle Ferrari 410 SuperAmerica (a wreck after a serious car crash on the way to Zakopane; the only thing that remained functional was the engine—Mr Automobile's uncle bought it and installed in his self-constructed vehicle). The car can reach a very high speed and is capable of traversing water and difficult terrain. Many people perceived this vehicle as ugly because of its dubledore-like design.

His other name, Tomasz N.N., comes from the author's real name, Zbigniew Tomasz Nowicki, the second "N" representing his adopted surname, Nienacki.

=== Allies ===
Pan Samochodzik is sometimes accompanied by youngsters—often Polish Boy Scouts.

Novels written by authors other than Nienacki also feature Paweł Daniec, a young art historian, ex-commando and sidekick of Samochodzik.

=== Villains ===
Pan Samochodzik's nemesis is Waldemar Batura, former art historian, smuggler and thief.

Novels written by authors other than Nienacki feature Jerzy Batura, new villain, son and successor of Waldemar.

== Novels ==
=== Original Nienacki novels ===
Note: The dates of the following novels may be inaccurate, as some of them may have been published in a different order than they were written.

In the first three novels (Pozwolenie na przywóz lwa, 'Skarb Atanaryka and Uroczysko), Pan Samochodzik is a journalist, not a government employee. In the 1990s, Nienacki rewrote those three books so they would be consistent with the series. The books were released by various publishers, and it was not until 1987 that a single publisher (Pojezierze) decided to rerelease the series with one graphic design.

- Pozwolenie na przywóz lwa — Permit for the transport of a lion (new title: Pierwsza przygoda Pana Samochodzika — First Adventure of Pan Samochodzik) (1961)
- Skarb Atanaryka — The Treasure of Athanaric (new title: Pan Samochodzik i skarb Atanaryka — Pan Samochodzik and the Treasure of Athanaric) (1960)
- Uroczysko — Sacred place (new title: Pan Samochodzik i święty relikwiarz — Pan Samochodzik and the Holy Reliquary) (1957)
- Wyspa Złoczyńców — The Island of Villains (new title: Pan Samochodzik i Wyspa Złoczyńców — Pan Samochodzik and the Island of Villains) (1964)
- Pan Samochodzik i templariusze — Pan Samochodzik and the Knights Templar (1966)
- Niesamowity dwór — Unearthly Mansion (new title: Pan Samochodzik i niesamowity dwór — Pan Samochodzik and the Unearthly Mansion) (1970)
- Nowe przygody Pana Samochodzika — New Adventures of Pan Samochodzik (new title: Pan Samochodzik i Kapitan Nemo — Pan Samochodzik and Captain Nemo) (1970)
- Pan Samochodzik i Fantomas — Pan Samochodzik and Fantômas (1973)
- Pan Samochodzik i zagadki Fromborka — Pan Samochodzik and the Riddles of Frombork (1972)
- Księga strachów — The Book of Fear (new title: Pan Samochodzik i dziwne szachownice — Pan Samochodzik and Strange Checkerboards) (1967)
- Pan Samochodzik i tajemnica tajemnic — Pan Samochodzik and the Secret of Secrets (1975)
- Pan Samochodzik i Winnetou — Pan Samochodzik and Winnetou (1976)
- Pan Samochodzik i Niewidzialni — Pan Samochodzik and the Invisible (1977)
- Pan Samochodzik i złota rękawica — Pan Samochodzik and the Golden Gauntlet (1979)
- Pan Samochodzik i człowiek z UFO — Pan Samochodzik and the Man from UFO (new title: Pan Samochodzik i Nieśmiertelny — Pan Samochodzik and the Immortal) (1985)

=== Nienacki novels completed by Jerzy Ignaciuk ===
- Pan Samochodzik i nieuchwytny kolekcjoner (1997) (Only partially written, completed by Jerzy Ignaciuk)
- Pan Samochodzik i... Testament rycerza Jędrzeja (1997) (re-written by Jerzy Ignaciuk, originally unconnected with the Pan Samochodzik series and named Zabójstwo Herakliusza Pronobisa)

=== Novels by other authors ===
After Nienacki's death in 1994, his publishers (Warmia) received permission from his estate to continue the series. The new novels take place in post-communist Poland, introduce two new main characters (sidekick Paweł Daniec and villain Jerzy Batura), and in the newest book, replace the old vehicle with a new, Jeep-based variant.

- (17) Pan Samochodzik i Kindżał Hasan-Beja by Jerzy Szumski (1997)
- (18) Pan Samochodzik i Bursztynowa Komnata (2 parts), by Jerzy Szumski (1998)
- (19) Pan Samochodzik i Złoto Inków (2 parts) by Jerzy Szumski (1999)
- (20) Pan Samochodzik i Arka Noego by Andrzej Pilipiuk (under the pen name Tomasz Olszakowski) (1999)
- (21) Pan Samochodzik i Rubinowa tiara by Andrzej Pilipiuk (under the pen name Tomasz Olszakowski) (1999)
- (22) Pan Samochodzik i Twierdza Boyen by Sebastian Miernicki (1999)
- (23) Pan Samochodzik i Floreny z Zalewa by Jerzy Szumski (2000)
- (24) Pan Samochodzik i Tajemnice warszawskich fortów by Andrzej Pilipiuk (under the pen name Tomasz Olszakowski) (2000)
- (25) Pan Samochodzik i Skarby Wikingów (2 parts) by Arkadiusz Niemirski (2000)
- (26) Pan Samochodzik i Zaginiony pociąg by Tomasz Olszakowski (2000)
- (27) Pan Samochodzik i Skarb generała Samsonowa (2 parts) by Sebastian Miernicki (2000)
- (28) Pan Samochodzik i Sekret alchemika Sędziwoja by Andrzej Pilipiuk (under the pen name Tomasz Olszakowski) (2001)
- (29) Pan Samochodzik i Kaukaski Wilk by Sebastian Miernicki (2001)
- (30) Pan Samochodzik i Arsen Lupin (2 parts) by Arkadiusz Niemirski (2001)
- (31) Pan Samochodzik i Zaginione poselstwo by Andrzej Pilipiuk (under the pen name Tomasz Olszakowski) (2001)
- (32) Pan Samochodzik i Skrytka Tryzuba by Sebastian Miernicki (2001)
- (33) Pan Samochodzik i Łup barona Ungerna by Andrzej Pilipiuk (under the pen name Tomasz Olszakowski) (2001)
- (34) Pan Samochodzik i Amerykańska przygoda, by Arkadiusz Niemirski (2002)
- (35) Pan Samochodzik i Europejska przygoda by Arkadiusz Niemirski (2002)
- (36) Pan Samochodzik i Zagubione miasto by Andrzej Pilipiuk (under the pen name Tomasz Olszakowski) (2002)
- (37) Pan Samochodzik i Wilhelm Gustloff by Sebastian Miernicki (2002)
- (38) Pan Samochodzik i Przemytnicy by Arkadiusz Niemirski (2002)
- (39) Pan Samochodzik i Wynalazek inżyniera Rychnowskiego by Andrzej Pilipiuk (under the pen name Tomasz Olszakowski) (2002)
- (40) Pan Samochodzik i Potomek szwedzkiego admirała by Andrzej Pilipiuk (under the pen name Tomasz Olszakowski) (2002)
- (41) Pan Samochodzik i Operacja Królewiec by Sebastian Miernicki, (2002)
- (42) Pan Samochodzik i Ikona z Warszawy by Andrzej Pilipiuk (under the pen name Tomasz Olszakowski) (2002)
- (43) Pan Samochodzik i Buzdygan hetmana Mazepy by Sebastian Miernicki (2002)
- (44) Pan Samochodzik i Czarny książę by Andrzej Pilipiuk (under the pen name Tomasz Olszakowski) (2002)
- (45) Pan Samochodzik i Fałszerze by Arkadiusz Niemirski (2002)
- (46) Pan Samochodzik i Bractwa rycerskie by Sebastian Miernicki (2002)
- (47) Pan Samochodzik i Więzień Jasnej Góry by Andrzej Pilipiuk (under the pen name Tomasz Olszakowski) (2003)
- (48) Pan Samochodzik i Zagadka kaszubskiego rodu by Arkadiusz Niemirski (2003)
- (49) Pan Samochodzik i Pruska korona by Sebastian Miernicki (2003)
- (50) Pan Samochodzik i Brązowy notes by Andrzej Pilipiuk (under the pen name Tomasz Olszakowski) (2003)
- (51) Pan Samochodzik i Krzyż lotaryński by Arkadiusz Niemirski (2003)
- (52) Pan Samochodzik i Szaman by Sebastian Miernicki (2003)
- (53) Pan Samochodzik i Gocki książę by Sebastian Miernicki (2003)
- (54) Pan Samochodzik i Stara księga by Arkadiusz Niemirski (2003)
- (55) Pan Samochodzik i Relikwia krzyżowca by Sebastian Miernicki (2003)
- (56) Pan Samochodzik i Adam z Wągrowca by Andrzej Pilipiuk (under the pen name Tomasz Olszakowski) (2003)
- (57) Pan Samochodzik i Złoty Bafomet by Arkadiusz Niemirski (2003)
- (58) Pan Samochodzik i Baszta Nietoperzy by Jacek Mróz (2003)
- (59) Pan Samochodzik i Rodzinny talizman by Józef Burny (2003)
- (60) Pan Samochodzik i Pasażer Von Steubena by Sebastian Miernicki (2003)
- (61) Pan Samochodzik i Zakładnicy by Arkadiusz Niemirski (2004)
- (62) Pan Samochodzik i Zamek Czocha by Sebastian Miernicki (2004)
- (63) Pan Samochodzik i Mumia egipska by Andrzej Pilipiuk (under the pen name Tomasz Olszakowski) (2004)
- (64) Pan Samochodzik i Diable wiano by Andrzej Pilipiuk (under the pen name Tomasz Olszakowski) (2004)
- (65) Pan Samochodzik i Joannici by Sebastian Miernicki (2004)
- (66) Pan Samochodzik i Kradzież w Nieporęcie by Arkadiusz Niemirski (2004)
- (67) Pan Samochodzik i Królewska baletnica by Sebastian Miernicki (2004)
- (68) Pan Samochodzik i Relikwiarz świętego Olafa by Andrzej Pilipiuk (under the pen name Tomasz Olszakowski) (2004)
- (69) Pan Samochodzik i Strachowisko by Józef Burny (2004)
- (70) Pan Samochodzik i Rękopis z Poznania by Jacek Mróz (2005)
- (71) Pan Samochodzik i Włamywacze by Arkadiusz Niemirski (2005)
- (72) Pan Samochodzik i Siódmy wojownik by Sebastian Miernicki (2005)
- (73) Pan Samochodzik i Sztolnia 'Hexe' by Sebastian Miernicki (2005)
- (74) Pan Samochodzik i Wawelskie regalia by Krzysztof Zagórski (2005)
- (75) Pan Samochodzik i Projekt 'Chronos' by Arkadiusz Niemirski (2005)
- (76) Pan Samochodzik i Perły księżnej Daisy by Iga Karst (2005)
- (77) Pan Samochodzik i Zamek w Chęcinach by Andrzej Pilipiuk (under the pen name Tomasz Olszakowski) (2005)
- (78) Pan Samochodzik i Przesyłka z Petersburga by Sebastian Miernicki (2005)
- (79) Pan Samochodzik i Szyfr profesora Kraka by Sebastian Miernicki (2005)
- (80) Pan Samochodzik i święty Graal by Arkadiusz Niemirski (2006)
- (81) Pan Samochodzik i Listy Mikołaja Kopernika by Sebastian Miernicki (2006)
- (82) Pan Samochodzik i Atlantyda by Arkadiusz Niemirski (2006)
- (83) Pan Samochodzik i Zamek w Malborku by Sebastian Miernicki (2006)
- (84) Pan Samochodzik i Knyszyńskie klejnoty by Krzysztof Zagórski (2006)
- (85) Pan Samochodzik i Wyspa Sobieszewska by Sebastian Miernicki (2006)
- (86) Pan Samochodzik i Podziemia Wrocławia by Iga Karst (2007)
- (87) Pan Samochodzik i Truso by Maciek Horn (2007)
- (88) Pan Samochodzik i 'Lalka' by Jakub Czarny (2007)
- (89) Pan Samochodzik i Janosik by Sebastian Miernicki (2007)
- (90) Pan Samochodzik i Zamek w Baranowie Sandomierskim by Sebastian Miernicki (2007)
- (91) Pan Samochodzik i Zamek w Rynie by Sebastian Miernicki (2007)
- (92) Pan Samochodzik i Pałac Kultury i Sztuki by Jakub Czarny (2007)
- (93) Pan Samochodzik i El Greco by Jakub Czarny (2007)
- (94) Pan Samochodzik i Wyklęci mistrzowie by Jakub Czarny (2008)
- (95) Pan Samochodzik i Eldorado by Iga Karst (2008)
- (96) Pan Samochodzik i Toruńska tajemnica by Marek Żelech (2008)
- (97) Pan Samochodzik i Castrum Doloris by Jakub Czarny (2009)
- (98) Pan Samochodzik i Płonący miecz by Jakub Czarny (2009)
- (99) Pan Samochodzik i Bractwo Dębu by Marek Żelech (2009)
- (100) Pan Samochodzik i Napoleoński Dragon by Sebastian Miernicki (2009)
- (101) Pan Samochodzik i Obraz Rafaela by Jakub Czarnik (2009)
- (102) Pan Samochodzik i Biblia Lutra by Jakub Czarnik (2009)
- (103) Pan Samochodzik i Fortepian Chopina by Jakub Czarnik (2010)
- (104) Pan Samochodzik i Klasztor w Zagórzu by Jakub Czarnik (2010)
- (105) Pan Samochodzik i Skarby iławskiego ratusza by Jakub Czarnik (2011)
- (106) Pan Samochodzik i Willa 'Anna' by Jakub Czarnik (2011)
- (107) Pan Samochodzik i Królestwo na krańcu świata by Marek Żelech (2011)
- (108) Pan Samochodzik i Promienie śmierci by Marek Żelech (2012)
- (109) Pan Samochodzik i Machina chaosu by Marek Żelech (2012)
- (110) Pan Samochodzik i Skarb UB by Andrzej Irski (2012)
- (111) Pan Samochodzik i Zagubiony rękopis by Marek Żelech (2013)
- (112) Pan Samochodzik i Leśna samotnia by Andrzej Irski (2013)
- (113) Pan Samochodzik i Depozyt hrabiego Paca by Andrzej Irski (2013)
- (114) Pan Samochodzik i Duchy piramidy w Rapie by Andrzej Irski (2013)
- (115) Pan Samochodzik i Wieczne miasto by Paweł Wiliński (2013)
- (116) Pan Samochodzik i Sekret drewnianej kapliczki by Paweł Wiliński (2013)
- (117) Pan Samochodzik i Ukryta biblioteka by Marek Żelech (2013)
- (118) Pan Samochodzik i Tablice mormonów by Andrzej Irski (2014)
- (119) Pan Samochodzik i Skrzynie Sturmbannführera by Luiza Frosz (2014)
- (120) Pan Samochodzik i Pałac w Samostrzelu by Paweł Wiliński (2014)
- (121) Pan Samochodzik i Ostatnia komandoria by Konrad Kuśmirak (2014)
- (122) Pan Samochodzik i Pamiętniki Gaudiego by Kamil Kozakowski (2014)
- (123) Pan Samochodzik i Lwy ze Starej Wody by Amos Oskar Ajchel (2014)
- (124) Pan Samochodzik i Sztucery Göringa by Andrzej Irski (2014)
- (125) Pan Samochodzik i Dwór Artusa w Toruniu by Paweł Wiliński (2014)
- (126) Pan Samochodzik i Projekt 'Perseusz' by Marek Żelech (2014)
- (127) Pan Samochodzik i Powstańcza kasa by Andrzej Irski (2014)
- (128) Pan Samochodzik i Ciechocińska macewa by Paweł Wiliński (2015)
- (129) Pan Samochodzik i Zamek w Głogówku by Bartłomiej Giziński (2015)
- (130) Pan Samochodzik i Jacht ze Sztynortu by Andrzej Irski (2015)
- (131) Pan Samochodzik i Skrzynia z Egiptu by Paweł Wiliński (2015)
- (132) Pan Samochodzik i Oficer Widmo by Luiza Frosz (2015)
- (133) Pan Samochodzik i Karolinka z Gogolina by Bartłomiej Giziński (2015)
- (134) Pan Samochodzik i Rabusie w sanktuarium by Andrzej Irski (2015)
- (135) Pan Samochodzik i Kosztowności rodu Paców by Bartłomiej Giziński (2016)
- (136) Pan Samochodzik i Mysia Wieża w Kruszwicy by Paweł Wiliński (2016)
- (137) Pan Samochodzik i Klątwa Jacwingów by Andrzej Irski (2016)
- (138) Pan Samochodzik i Bibliofilka z Inowrocławia by Paweł Wiliński (2016)
- (139) Pan Samochodzik i Spadek księcia światopełka by Andrzej Irski (2016)
- (140) Pan Samochodzik i Taśmy zbrodni by Andrzej Irski (2016)
- (141) Pan Samochodzik i Labirynt Behemota by Marek Żelech (2017)
- (142) Pan Samochodzik i Duch z Kazimierza Dolnego by Luiza Frosz (2017)
- (143) Pan Samochodzik i Kronikarz z UPA by Andrzej Irski (2017)
- (144) Pan Samochodzik i śledztwo w Brześciu Kujawskim by Paweł Wiliński (2017)
- (145) Pan Samochodzik i Upiór znad Biebrzy by Andrzej Irski (2017)
- (146) Pan Samochodzik i Kuferek ojca Alfonsa by Andrzej Irski (2017)
- (147) Pan Samochodzik i ślad wilkołaka by Andrzej Irski (2017)
- (148) Pan Samochodzik i Wiedzma ze świętajna by Andrzej Irski (2018)
- (149) Pan Samochodzik i Zaginiony autobus by Łukasz Supel (2018)
- (150) Pan Samochodzik i Droga na złomowisko by Marek Żelech (2018)
- (151) Pan Samochodzik i Szkatułka 'Lupaszki' by Andrzej Irski (2019)
- (152) Pan Samochodzik i Escape Castle by Marek Żelech (2019)
- (153) Pan Samochodzik i Zagadka wrocławskiego toru by Łukasz Supel (2019)
- (154) Pan Samochodzik i Strachy z Ublika by Andrzej Irski (2020)
- (155) Pan Samochodzik i Tajemniczy Sarkofag by Grzegorz Szmatuła (2020)
- (156) Pan Samochodzik i Okruchy przeszłości by Marek Żelech (2020)
- (157) Pan Samochodzik i Pocztówka z Grunwaldu by Łukasz Supel (2020)
- (158) Pan Samochodzik i Artefakty z Godziszewa by Stefan Kot (2021)
- (159) Pan Samochodzik i Rzymska kohorta by Maciej Burski-Walden (2021)
- (160) Pan Samochodzik i Korona króla Popiela by Łukasz Supel (2021)
- (161) Pan Samochodzik i Romański krzyż by Stefan Kot (2021)
- (162) Pan Samochodzik i Zaszyfrowana przeszłość by Marek Żelech (2022)
- (163) Pan Samochodzik i Zabytek z koprolitu by Stefan Kot (2022)

== Pan Samochodzik in other media ==
=== Film ===
- Wyspa Złoczyńców (1965, directed by Stanisław Jędryka), based on Wyspa Złoczyńców
- Pan Samochodzik i niesamowity dwór (1986, directed by Janusz Kidawa), based on Niesamowity dwór
- Pan Samochodzik i praskie tajemnice (1988, directed by Kazimierz Tarnas), based on Pan Samochodzik i tajemnica tajemnic
- Latające machiny kontra Pan Samochodzik (1991, directed by Janusz Kidawa), based on Pan Samochodzik i złota rękawica

=== Television ===
- Samochodzik i templariusze (1971, five-episode miniseries directed by Hubert Drapella), based on Pan Samochodzik i templariusze

== Crossovers ==
Pan Samochodzik has crossovers with Jakub Wędrowycz and the protagonists of the Kuzynki series, both written by Andrzej Pilipiuk.

== Pan Samochodzik series writers ==
- Zbigniew Nienacki—17 novels
- Sebastian Miernicki (Sebastian Mierzyński)—27 novels
- Tomasz Olszakowski (Andrzej Pilipiuk)—19 novels
- Andrzej Irski (Ireneusz Sewastianowicz)—19 novels
- Arkadiusz Niemirski—16 novels
- Jakub Czarny (Jakub Czarny)—12 novels
- Marek Żelech (Marek Żelkowski)—12 novels
- Paweł Wiliński—9 novels
- Jerzy Szumski (Jerzy Ignaciuk)—4 novels
- Luiza Frosz—3 novels
- Bartłomiej Giziński—3 novels
- Iga Karst—3 novels
- Łukasz Supel—3 novels
- Józef Burny (Józef Burniewicz)—2 novels
- Maciej Burski-Walden—1 novel
- Jacek Mróz (Józef Jacek Rojek)—2 novels
- Krzysztof Zagórski—2 novels
- Amos Oskar Ajchel—1 novel
- Maciek Horn (Maciej Książek)—1 novel
- Stefan Kot—1 novel
- Kamil Kozakowski—1 novel
- Konrad Kuśmirak—1 novel
- Grzegorz Szmatuła—1 novel
