= Dzikie Pola (role-playing game) =

- Cover of Dzikie Pola 2nd edition is based on "Towarzysz pancerny", oil on canvas by Józef Brandt.
- Designers: Jacek Komuda, Maciej Jurewicz, Marcin Baryłka
- Publishers: Wydawnictwo MAG
- Publication: 1997 (1st edition); 2005 (2nd edition)
- Genres: Historical fiction
- Systems: Custom

Dzikie Pola (Wild Fields) is a Polish role-playing game, set in the historical setting of the 17th century Polish–Lithuanian Commonwealth. It had two editions: first in 1997 and second in 2005.

== History ==
Cover of the first edition.

The first edition of the game was released in 1997. Its authors were Jacek Komuda, Maciej Jurewicz and Marcin Baryłka, and there were two expansions: W stepie szerokim (In the wide steppe) and Ogniem i mieczem (With fire and sword). The second edition of the game has been released in 2005, and its authors were Jacek Komuda, Michał Mochocki and Artur Machlowski.

The game is only available in Polish and is one of the most popular role-playing games in Poland. The second edition rulebook contains long and extensive sections describing the historical setting of the 17th century Commonwealth, some of which are presented from the viewpoint of contemporary storytellers, others resemble modern encyclopedic entries.

== Setting ==
The game is set in the historical setting of the 17th century Polish–Lithuanian Commonwealth. Players characters are the Polish nobility (szlachta), and most of the adventures are set in the turbulent, south-eastern region of Zaporizhzhia (region known then in Poland as 'Dzikie Pola', today mostly in Ukraine). It's the twilight time of the Polish Golden Age, with looming destabilization of Golden Liberty and government sliding into anarchy due to magnates plots and mounting serfdom-related tensions, especially involving the Cossacks. Conflicts between numerous nobles, duels and increasing internal unrest are common themes, while magic is rare (and depends on how far the gamemaster wants to move away from historical reality).

== Mechanic ==
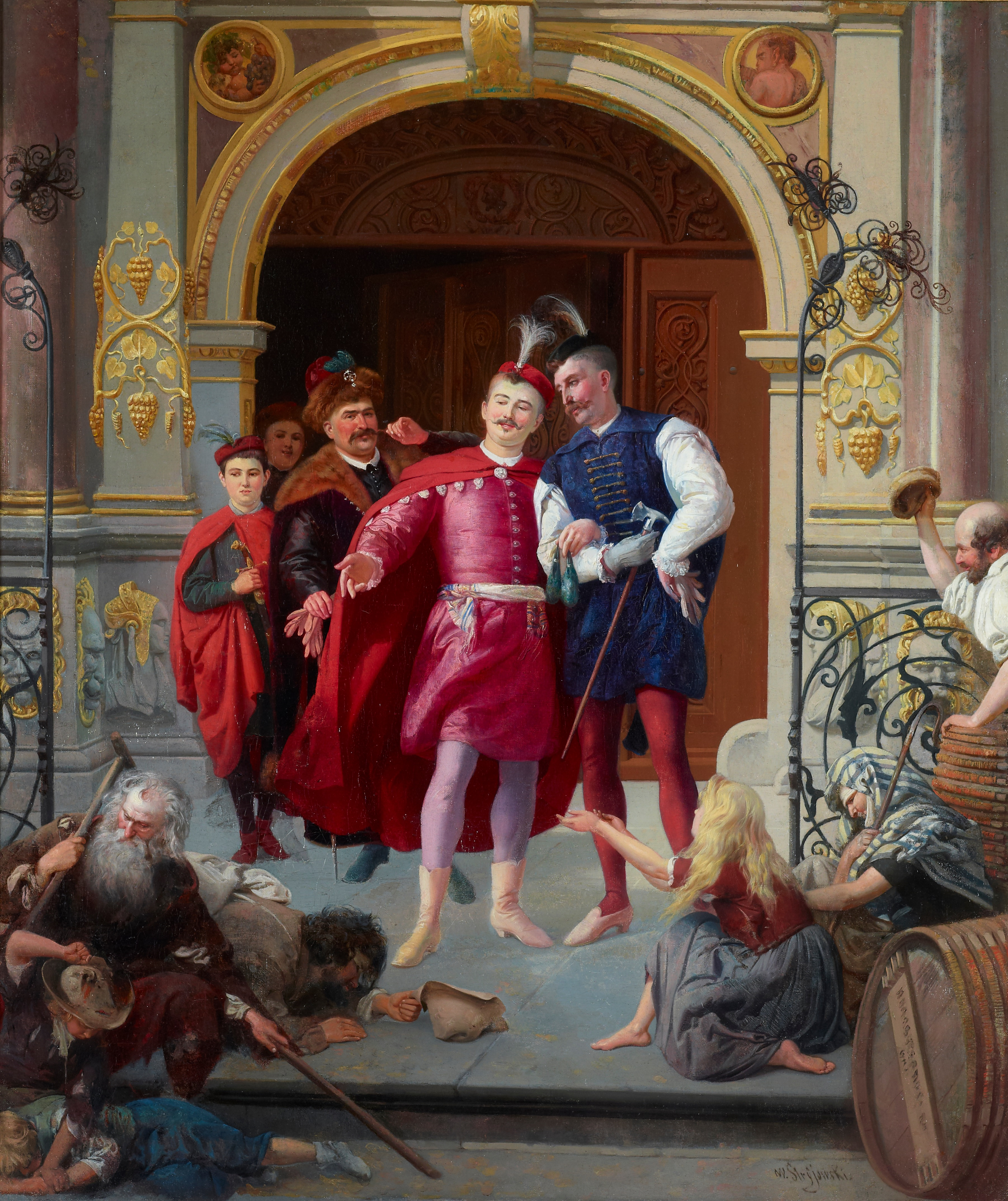
Polish szlachta in Gdańsk. Painting by Wilhelm August Stryowski.

Dzikie Pola second edition has its own unique game mechanic, based on the d20 die.

There are no die rolls needed during the character creation. Player characters abilities and skills are simply bought for a set number of points. Hit points are not dependent on advancement level (each character has the same number of wounds he can take before dying) and character advancement is fairly slow, making it a more realistic than heroic system. Player characters are usually those of Polish nobles, but foreigners are also permitted. Some of the abilities or (dis)advantages are unique to this historical setting, like playing with a character sentenced to banishment or infamy, a fake noble, a newly ennobled character or a character with an official title.

During the game, tests are made with a simple d20 die roll, modified by testing characters' attributes, skills and other situation modifiers. If the roll is higher than the difficulty level, the action is successful.

Most of the mechanic is dedicated to the combat system. Game has mechanics for both the mêlée combat and firearm combat, but it is the former — with szablas (a Polish type of a sabre) or rapiers (used mostly by foreigners) — that most rules are dedicated to. Players can use more than 30 different moves during combat, and thus at the time of combat, especially between experienced players, the games take on an almost tactical flavour.

== Reviews ==
Marcin Bauer from the Polish magazine "Talizman" gave the first edition of Dzikie Pola a positive review, deeming it "a good system, worth recommending" to both those interested in historical games and a wider audience of gamers. He praised the game mechanics, which he described as successful, and found the ability to assign players the roles of Podstarosty (Sub-Game Master) allowing them to play as NPCs, to be a particularly interesting idea. He also praised the rulebook's style, finding it interesting and well-written. The reviewer also positively opined on the illustrations included in the chapters devoted to combat. However, he criticized the map of the Polish-Lithuanian Commonwealth, which did not account for changes in the country's borders over the broad historical period adopted by the authors, and recommended using maps from historical atlases during play. Among the publication's shortcomings, Bauer also cited insufficient proofreading of the final section of the rulebook. He criticized the overly narrow price list, the lack of information on horse breeds found in Poland and their prices, the limited number of presented coats of arms of the Polish and Lithuanian nobility, and numerous errors in the dates of office held by hetmans and the years of reign of the Muscovite princes. He also noted errors in the use of Latin in the terminology of the game mechanics and in the dedication to Stefan Batory.

Other reviews:

- Adriano Kuc, Dzikie Pola Review: Wild Fields, RPG REVIEW Issue #12, June 2011
- Robert Dudziński, „Dzikie pola: Rzeczpospolita w ogniu” - recenzja i ocena systemu RPG, Histmag, 16 October 2005
- Michał Sołtysiak, Dzikie Pola - Edycja Druga, polter.pl, 20 March 2006
- Pan Brat, Rebel Times, Numer 33 / Czerwiec 2010
- Dzikie Pola, Rebel Times, Numer 17 / Luty 2009

== See also ==
=== Historical setting ===
- History of Poland in the early modern period (1569–1795)
- Polish–Lithuanian Commonwealth
- Sarmatism

=== Games set in similar historical setting ===
- Veto

=== Games with similar mechanic ===
- 7th Sea
- The Riddle of Steel
