= Veto (card game) =

Polish collectible card game set in the 17th-century

Szlachecka Gra Karciana Veto! (transl. Noble Card Game Veto!) is a Polish collectible card game (CCG) set in the 17th-century Polish–Lithuanian Commonwealth, with an alternate history inspired by historical events, literature, and legends (the Czarty i Upiory season [Chorts and Upiórs]). Players control factions during the free election. The goal of the game is to either place their candidate on the throne (the elected king) or defeat the opposing faction.

The game had two editions. The first edition of the game was released between 2004 and 2005. The second edition was released between 2007 and 2017. It was one of the first Polish CCGs.

== History ==
The first edition of the game was released between 2004 and 2005 by the Krakowska Grupa Kreacyjna (consisting of Kuba Janicki, Krzysztof Schechtel, Tomasz Majkowski, Marcin Tomczyk, Michał Rokita). After just four months, the creators estimated that nearly a thousand people were playing the game.

The second edition was released between 2007 and 2017 and had several publishers. It debuted in 2007 (published by Imperium Publishing), and from June 2009 until 2013, the game was published by Kuźnia Gier. In 2014, the publisher became Fabryka Gier Historycznych, and in 2015, the game was taken over by Veto Publishing. In 2017, Veto Publishing announced a "temporary suspension of publishing activities".

The game had an active tournament scene. There was a national player ranking, and for several years Fabryka Gier Historycznych organized national championships under the name Individual Polish Championships, as well as the Elite Sarmatian Tournament.

In a 2009 review on the Poltergeist website, the game was described as one of "the most popular Polish card games". According to one of the creators, the game's golden period was from 2009 to 2012, when it was the second most popular collectible card game in Poland (after Magic: The Gathering). During this period, the game had "hundreds of tournaments annually, hundreds of active players, and even more silent supporters". The decline in popularity after 2012 was attributed to the theme of the Czarty i Upiory season, which was criticized for "departing from the Sienkiewicz-like atmosphere" and focusing on "supernatural phenomena" (such as introducing characters like the Devil Boruta or monsters like utopce), as well as competition from the growing popularity of LCG titles (e.g., Android: Netrunner). According to a 2015 article in Komputer Świat, the game was "experiencing a renaissance and was once again entering a phase of glory".

In 2010, a standalone expansion, Veto! Konfrontacja (Veto! Confrontation), was also released. Veto! received spin-offs in the form of board games: Veto: The Boardgame in 2013 (authors: Krzysztof Schechtel, Michał Stachyra, Maciej Zasowski) and Liberum Veto in 2016.

== Mechanics ==
The game is designed for two players, each controlling a faction during the free election. The objective is to either secure the throne for their candidate (the elected king) or defeat the opposing faction. Players collect and build decks of cards representing various heroes, armaments, locations, fencing maneuvers, and events, both specific (such as particular battles) and generic to the game's era. The game also features tokens, which represent ducats and votes in the Sejm. Ducats are used to deploy and upgrade heroes (for example, with armament cards). Heroes then carry out agitation actions or engage in duels, gathering votes and weakening the opponent.

=== Factions ===
There are five factions in the game: Awanturnicy, Dworscy, Radziwiłłowie, Osmanowie, and Wiśniowieccy, each with a different play style.

- Awanturnicy (Troublemakers) – the faction most oriented towards aggressive and plundering play. Formerly associated with noble infamis and brawlers, it is now filled with Cossacks. The Troublemakers' elected king is Bohdan Khmelnytsky.
- Dworscy (Courtly) – primarily covering central Poland. The main figure of the Courtly faction is John II Casimir Vasa, and their emblem is the Vaza coat of arms. The Courtly faction relies on wealth and influential figures, staying out of reach of opponents and avoiding duels.
- Radziwiłłowie (Radziwiłłs) – their territory is Lithuania. The Radziwiłłs focus mainly on conspiracies and inciting crowds, winning primarily through agitation. The elected king of the Radziwiłłs is Janusz Radziwiłł.
- Wiśniowieccy (Wiśniowieckis) – originating from Ruthenia, they focus on combat and using their fame to gain support through prominent figures like Jan Skrzetuski, Longinus Podbipięta, and Michał Wołodyjowski. The elected king of the Wiśniowieckis is Prince Jeremi Wiśniowiecki.
- Osmanowie (Ottomans) – from the Ottoman Empire, they gained control over Poland (King Ibrahim I) during the Szpiedzy i Dyplomaci (Spies and Diplomats) season, but their rule was overthrown with its end. Since the release of the Czarty i Upiory season, this faction is no longer supported.

== Analysis ==
The game is considered one of the examples of the significance of Sarmatian (noble, First Commonwealth) culture in Polish pop culture and the gaming industry. Veto! draws its direct inspiration from the role-playing game Dzikie Pola (Wild Fields) and the works of Jacek Komuda. The game contains numerous historical elements but mixes time periods and includes ahistorical elements – fictional characters and fantastic elements. Michał Machocki notes that the game features characters such as the deceased Stanisław Stadnicki (1610), the born-in-1612 Jeremi Wiśniowiecki, and fictional characters like Athos, Porthos, and Aramis, as well as other figures from the works of Henryk Sienkiewicz and Jacek Komuda.

Both the game creators and players agree that the game has educational value (in terms of historical information) and popularizes Sarmatian culture and, to some extent, patriotic values. Michał Machocki observes that Veto! presents the material and spiritual heritage of the Commonwealth in a broad but superficial way. The game conveys historical information in a simplified manner for gameplay purposes; however, even the basic game mechanism (gathering votes – kreski) includes information on the free election system and social structure (lack of voting rights among non-noble Polish men). He also writes that "the potential for historical education can be seen in the multitude of elements of material culture (types of weapons, armor, horses, drinks, clothing, economic buildings), social (social and professional groups, political and social events), and military (names and features of military formations), as well as the presence of historical figures". Beyond elements directly related to the game, the popularization of Sarmatian culture occurs through organizing events associated with Veto! tournaments, such as Sarmatian culture knowledge contests or the use of historical costumes (cosplay, historical reenactment).

The game is considered the first fully Polish collectible card game, i.e. developed in Poland and not using foreign IP; instead being based on Polish history and folklore. Veto! is not the first Polish-language CCG (that would be Swedish Doomtrooper, whose Polish edition was released in 1995); 2002 in turn saw the release of Thorgal: Kolekcjonerska Gra Karciana, developed in Poland but based on Belgian IP).

== Reception ==
In 2009, Mateusz Nowak reviewed the game for the magazine Rebel Times. He rated it positively (8/9 out of 10), praising the "solid and aesthetically pleasing" design, well-developed rules, atmosphere, and "enjoyable" gameplay, as well as the price. However, he criticized the weak instruction manual, noting that learning the game sometimes required "tedious searching for information on the Internet".

In the same year, a reviewer from the site Poltergeist praised the game for its accessible price, atmosphere, educational value, and recommended it "to anyone who enjoys good fun and intense competition", giving it a rating of 9.5.

In 2011, Justyna Lenda reviewed the game positively for the zine Esensja, commending its historical background, humor, and "juicy gameplay, full of dynamism, possibilities, and twists".

In 2012, Przemysław Mrówka reviewed the game positively for the site Histmag, describing it as "interesting, colorful, engaging, set in historical realities, and referencing the Sienkiewicz trilogy".

== See also ==
- Liberum veto
