= Kuzynki =

2003 novel by Andrzej Pilipiuk

- Author: Andrzej Pilipiuk
- Language: Polish
- Genre: fantasy
- Publisher: Fabryka Słów
- Publication date: 2003
- Publication place: Poland
- Media type: novel
- Followed by: Księżniczka

Kuzynki (Womenfolk) is a fantasy novel for young adults by Andrzej Pilipiuk; the first part of a series about the fates of the Kruszewska cousins, Monika Stiepankovic, and Master Sendivogius. It was first published by Fabryka Słów in 2003. The subsequent volumes are Księżniczka (The Princess, 2004), Dziedziczki (The Heiresses, 2005), and Zaginiona (The Lost One, 2014).

Originally, there was a short story published in the magazine Science Fiction, which won the Janusz A. Zajdel Award for 2002. The later book with the same title received a nomination for this award in 2003.

The story follows three women: the first, Princess Monika Stiepankovic, is a vampire; the second, Stanisława Kruszewska, possesses the philosopher's stone; the third, Katarzyna Kruszewska, a computer scientist and Central Investigation Bureau of Police agent, is a distant cousin of Stanisława and the youngest of the three heroines (although Monika appears younger, as she is frozen at the age of sixteen as a vampire). All three are seeking Michael Sendivogius, who can renew their dwindling supply of the philosopher's stone.

== Plot ==
Each of the three main heroines has her own life, comes from a different era, and was raised under different circumstances. The plot of the book unfolds as the paths of the three women converge. Initially, a strong bond forms between Katarzyna and Stasia – cousins. They both teach at the same girls' high school, where Monika is admitted. From then on, they share common interests, learn from each other, and complement each other in both knowledge and behavior. Despite resigning from the Central Investigation Bureau of Police, Katarzyna maintains contact with the general – her former boss – and uses the "company" database to find Sendivogius for Stanisława. Meanwhile, the women befriend a new student who astonishes with her intellectual abilities. Monika, who does not exert much effort in her studies, appears to be sixteen years old, but in reality, she has lived for 1,200 years. She possesses immense knowledge and manages well in life. For a time, she lives in an orphanage but struggles to acclimate. She moves to the forest and builds a shelter there. Money is not an issue for her – she earns by tutoring students. From time to time, she visits her teachers, who, by all means and various tricks, try to find the master before Dymitr. Princess Stiepankovic is kidnapped by the biology teacher Sieklucki and Dymitr – a treacherous student of Sendivogius. Severely injured by silver, she loses strength and consciousness. Her cousins find her, seeking revenge on Dymitr. However, he has already been killed by his teacher. Eventually, the girls meet the great alchemist. Invited by Michael, they participate in the creation of the philosopher's stone, which will grant them another 400 years of life.

== Characters ==
- Monika Stiepankovic – a girl who was rescued by Polish troops in Kosovo from a group of people who wanted to kill her. It turned out she was an Orthodox Bosnian princess, a vampire born in the 9th century. At the military base, she began learning Polish and was sent to an orphanage in Poland as a refugee from Kosovo (she appeared to be 16 years old). Feeling free, she started attending the school where Katarzyna and Stanisława taught. She was very beautiful and intelligent, admired by boys. Her vampire origins were discovered by two teachers with whom she became friends. She tried to adapt to the modern world – she specifically bought a mobile phone, a watch, and a portable laptop to facilitate her tutoring students. Since the beginning of the year, Monika set a high standard for her classmates. She had some academic gaps, but she was knowledgeable in most subjects, fluent in French, Serbian, Latin, and Greek. She was very strong and skilled in using weapons.
- Katarzyna Kruszewska – an employee of the Central Investigation Bureau of Police, the main brain behind operations, and an IT specialist. After leaving the bureau, she began teaching IT at a girls' high school. She is Stanisława's cousin. She became very fond of both her cousin, with whom she lived, and the little vampire Monika. Her life revolved around work. She was deeply involved in creating databases, often working late into the night. She also used the system for herself – searching for her cousin, whom she saw in many images from at least 400 years ago. She was a beautiful woman with a braid in which she kept a thin weapon, always ready for attack, and very cautious. She was clever, a computer and electronics expert – setting up cameras, surfing the internet, and fixing equipment were her specialties.
- Stanisława Kruszewska – according to family legend, she is immortal thanks to the philosopher's stone. She is highly educated, intelligent, and elegant. She knows several languages. After arriving from Ethiopia, she teaches French and physical education at a high school. She is composed and adheres to her principles. She comes from the Borderlands – in the 16th century, she was a student of Sendivogius. She had many acquaintances among historical figures – princes, kings, and politicians. She read extensively, trying to fill gaps in her memory. She was always prepared for an attack – she practiced martial arts, forced by frequent world travels. She was pedantic, and her attire and behavior did not fit the contemporary era, so Monika quickly realizes who she is.
- Dymitr – one of the five students of Sendivogius. He kills his classmates to gain a larger share of the philosopher's stone. He is killed by the alchemist in his own home after a failed attempt to murder the Master.
- Michael Sendivogius – an alchemist and teacher (Master) of five students, including Dymitr, Stanisława Kruszewska, and Jan Skórzewski. Always elegant and chivalrous. He only killed when necessary. He knew the method of creating the philosopher's stone. He loved attending meetings at a tavern with a group of nobles, writers, historians, and archaeologists dedicated to the 16th to 18th centuries.
- Sieklucki – a teacher at the same girls' high school as the cousins. In the back of his workshop, he cultivates a smallpox virus. He is involved in Monika's kidnapping and is later imprisoned by the Polish CIA.

== Editions ==
- Fabryka Słów, Lublin 2003, p. 295, ISBN 83-89011-13-1.
- (Revised): Fabryka Słów, Lublin 2007, p. 320, ISBN 978-83-60505-49-6 (softcover); ISBN 978-83-60505-50-2 (hardcover).
- Fabryka Słów, Lublin 2010, p. 320, ISBN 978-83-7574-247-3 (softcover).
- Fabryka Słów, Lublin 2012, p. 320, ISBN 978-83-7574-599-3 (softcover with flaps).
- Fabryka Słów, Lublin 2014, p. 320, ISBN 978-83-7574-915-1 (integrated cover).

== Awards ==
- Nominated for the Janusz A. Zajdel Award, 2003.
- Nominated for the Nautilus Award, 2003.

== Reception ==
In 2003, Paweł Dunin-Wąsowicz reviewed the book for Przekrój. The reviewer criticized the book, describing it as a hodgepodge of overused ideas painstakingly scavenged from the trash by the author and forcefully set in contemporary Polish realities. Dunin-Wąsowicz also criticized historical errors which he found egregious given that Pilipiuk considers himself an independent historian, citing two examples: a kapo in a camp is not a functional prisoner, but an uniformed Nazi (!), and the revolver Nagant described with affection was invented by the French (not the Belgians).

In the same year, an anonymous reviewer for Nowa Fantastyka gave a more positive review. The reviewer described the book as a light and pleasant... to the core Polish fantasy novel. However, they noted some minor flaws, including the author's unnecessary fondness for historical digressions and a style, sometimes excessively simplistic. Nevertheless, the review concluded that, while it is a book that one might forget shortly after reading, it allows one to feel the childlike joy of a summer adventure.

For the Poltergeist portal, the book was positively reviewed at the same time by two reviewers: Marcin Segit and Maciek Dzierżek. Segit praised the book for the successful change in the author's style, which had been mostly associated with his Jakub Wędrowycz series. According to Segit, instead of coarse, rough humor, Pilipiuk wrote a subtle story, occasionally bordering on a domestic novel and simultaneously fantasy at its best. Segit commended the engaging plot and characters, which he found vivid and lively but criticized the minor details – the mixing of narrative times and a somewhat overly journalistic style, the excessive use of ellipses, and occasional factual errors (such as locating the city of Tula in Siberia). Dzierżek praised the descriptions of Kraków and the well-measured pace of the captivating action but criticized the occasional flood of the author's personal views. In summary, he rated the book as very, very good.

Also in 2003, Agnieszka Szady reviewed the book for the zine Esensja. She noted that the book was written in a lively, easy-to-read language and warmly and with faith in people, with the main theme being friendship. She praised the digressive descriptions of curiosities (such as information about brewing tea in a samovar), the engaging plot, and the sympathetic characters.

In 2007, Jarosław Machura reviewed the book for the Histmag portal. The reviewer praised the plot for avoiding overused motifs in literature to the limits of possibility and the author for well-constructed characters, describing the three main characters as a truly original and highly intriguing trio. The reviewer also praised the adventurous dimension, considering the book full of... amazing plot twists [and] extraordinary [and] amusing... intrigues and conspiracies. He appreciated the author's personal reflections, or critique of contemporary civilization, which was, according to the reviewer, intelligently and gracefully written, as well as the various historical curiosities in the book, especially those concerning the history of Kraków. In conclusion, he rated the book as not only a good fantasy novel but above all excellent entertainment literature.
