= Wojsławice, Lublin Voivodeship =

Wojsławice
- Village
- Location within Poland
- Coordinates: 50°55′9″N 23°32′48″E
- Country: Poland
- Voivodeship: Lublin
- County: Chełm
- Gmina: Wojsławice

Population (approx.)
  - Total: 1,600

Wojsławice [vɔi̯swaˈvʲit͡sɛ] is a village in Chełm County, Lublin Voivodeship, in eastern Poland. It is the seat of the gmina (administrative district) called Gmina Wojsławice.

The village is a common setting of many literary works by Polish writer Andrzej Pilipiuk, in particular, related to his fictional character Jakub Wędrowycz, who lives in the nearby village of Stary Majdan. Since 2006, an annual fandom convention dedicated to has been taking place in Wojsławice, and a 3-meter tall wooden statue of the character has been raised in 2013.

There is an Orthodox Church of Our Lady of Kazan and Saint Elijah in the village, constructed in the Baroque style between 1771 and 1774 as a Uniate church. It became an Orthodox parish church during the Conversion of Chełm Eparchy. The Wojsławice parish remained active until the expulsion of the local Ukrainian Orthodox population in the 1940s, when it was closed due to a lack of worshippers. The abandoned church, used as a warehouse, gradually fell into ruin. It was only at the turn of the 20th and 21st centuries that it was renovated, but the absence of an Orthodox community in the town means it is only opened for religious services occasionally. The church has no iconostasis, and the only preserved piece of its original furnishings is a historic thurible.
