= Andrei Belyanin =

Russian writer (born 1967)

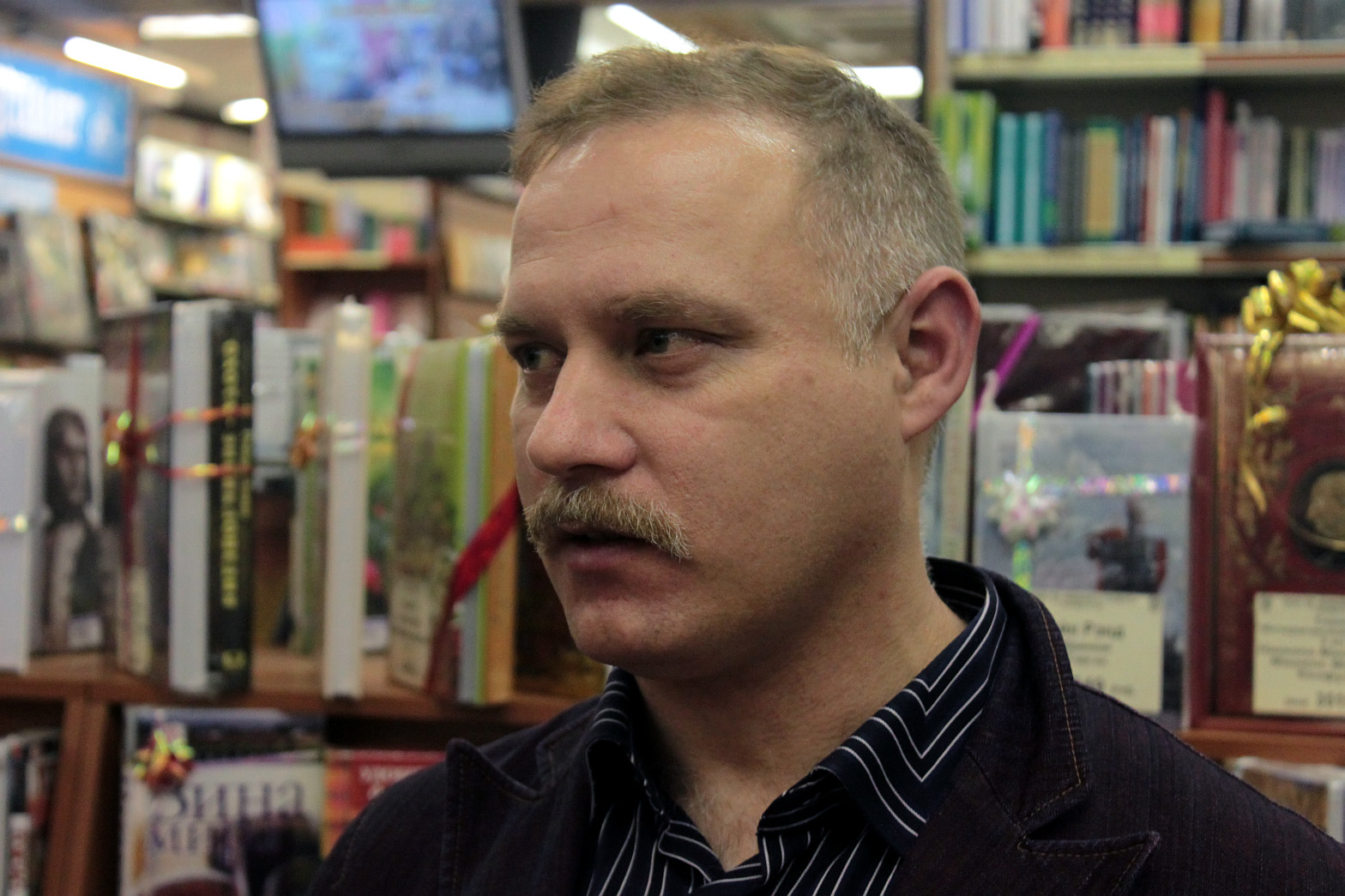
Andrei Belyanin (2009)

Andrei Olegovich Belyanin (born 24 January 1967, in Astrakhan) is a Russian science fiction and fantasy writer, who wrote at least 15 novels. He is especially known for humour and parody in his fiction. Many Belyanin's novels are mostly ironical stories about popadantsy, where humour is based on anachronisms.

== Personal ==
Belyanin had a son, Ivan, who was kidnapped in 2004 for sake of ransom. Although the kidnappers were arrested a few days after, Ivan Belyanin was found dead, as they killed him at the day of the kidnapping. The criminals, brothers Kirill and Ivan Kostylev, both were sentenced to prison.

== Works ==
=== Novels ===
==== Series ====
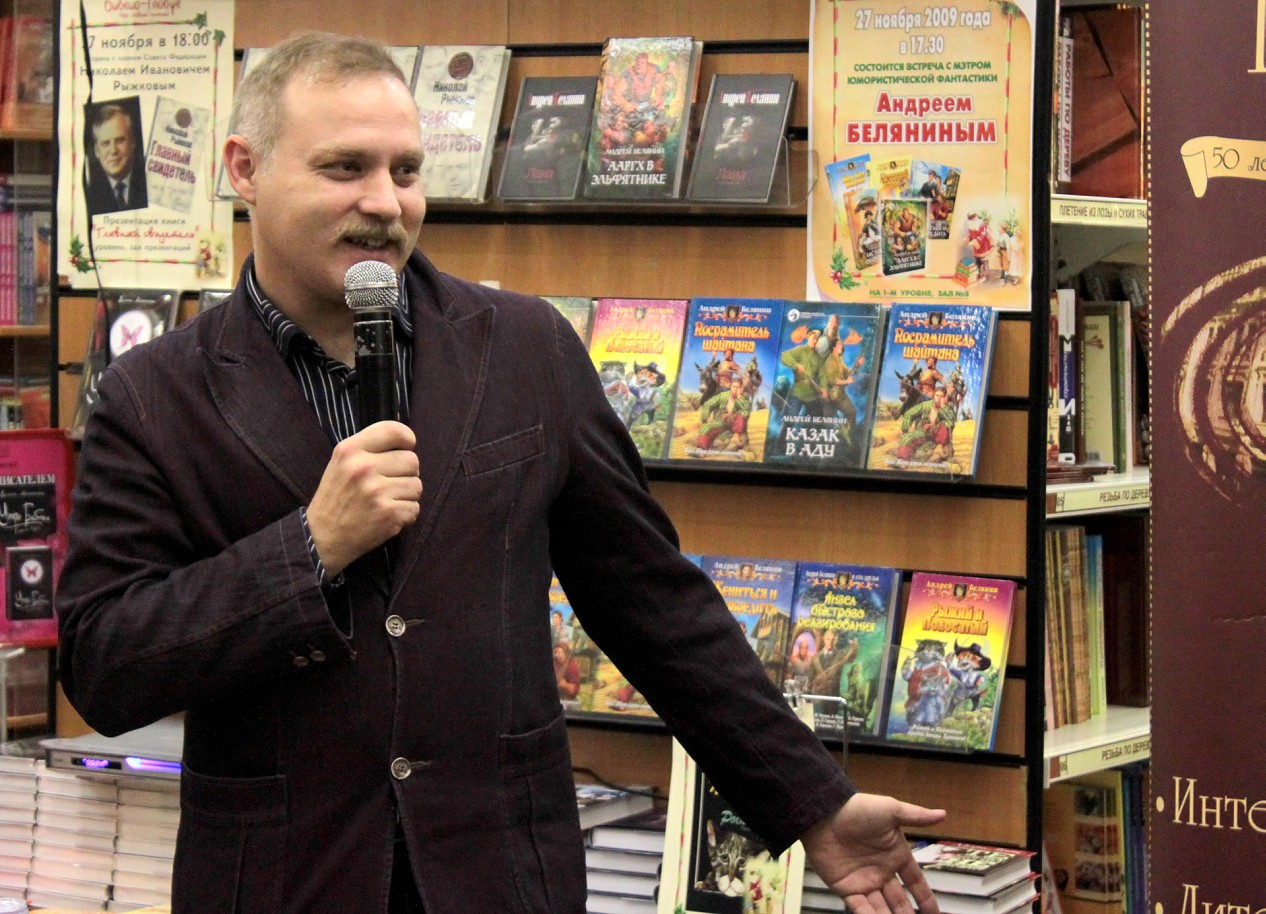
Andrei Belyanin and his books

- Sword with No Name ("Меч Без Имени")
  - Sword with No Name ("Меч Без Имени", 1997) - a modern-day man visits a medieval castle. After trying to show off to his wife by fighting with a fake sword, he comes upon the sword without a name, which chooses him as its wielder. He is transported into a kingdom which an evil sorcerer has taken over after the rightful king's death. As the wielder of the mystical "Sword with No Name", the man must end the threat of the sorcerer, while trying to preserve his own skin and find a way home.
  - The Furious Landgrave ("Свирепый Ландграф", 1998) - the protagonist of the first novel returns to the medieval land to find that the son of the sorcerer he defeated is scouring the land for his father's teeth, which he plans to use to revive his father's soul in his own son. Reunited with his "Sword with No Name", the hero must save the day once more.
  - The Age of Saint Skiminok ("Век Святого Скиминока", 1998) - the final book of the trilogy has the protagonist of the series taking on Lucifer, while trying to find a trace of his kidnapped son and, finally, sort out all the women in his life.
- Jack the Mad King ("Джек Сумасшедший Король")
  - Jack the Mad King (1996) - An amnesiac of clearly royal blood shows up on the doorstep of an old wizard. Naming him Jack, the wizard and his apprentice follow him on his quest to rediscover his identity. On the way, they encounter a beautiful daughter of a knight, who joins them for the time being. On their way they are pursued by the queen's assassins, and feeling that this is linked to Jack's lost identity, they travel to the capital to confront the queen herself.
  - Jack and the Mystery of the Ancient Castle ("Джек и Тайна Древнего Замка", 1997) - Jack and his companions enter a strange land where the people are being ruled by an odd woman from an old castle. As the woman makes the travellers her guests, things get even stranger.
  - Jack in the East ("Джек на Востоке", 1999) - Jack and his friends travel to a kingdom in the East to find the sultan's missing daughter.
- Tsar Gorokh's Detective Agency ("Тайный Сыск Царя Гороха")
  - Tsar Gorokh's Detective Agency("Тайный Сыск Царя Гороха", 1999) - Junior lieutenant Nikita Ivashov is a modern-day fresh-out-of-training policeman who finds himself in the ancient fairy tale tsardom ruled by the benevolent Gorokh, who asks the cop to open up a detective agency. The agency consists of Ivashov, Baba Yaga (specialist in all things magical and an amazing cook), and Mit'ka (strong but simple-minded assistant). Their first case - a stolen ring and a chest of gold. The simple case unravels into a race to stop a conspiracy take over the tsardom.
  - The Plot of the Black Mass ("Заговор Черной Мессы", 1999) - a series of minor crimes take place after a German ambassador arrives to the tsardom along with a Catholic priest. Investigation into the crimes uncovers a plot to summon a demon to upset the delicate balance between good and evil.
  - The Flying Ship ("Летучий Корабль", 2000) - when the tsar's mistress is found dead and the royal blueprints for a flying ship are discovered missing, the detectives must rush to find and recover them, before the thief can sell them to a foreign power. As the investigation progresses, Ivashov begins to feel attracted to a young woman that seems to be involved in the case. However, an old adversary may be responsible for the crimes committed.
  - Bride Elimination ("Отстрел Невест", 2002) - the tsar's palace is overrun... by princesses from all over the world, seeking to marry the tsar. However, as princess after princess begins to turn up comatose, Tsar Gorokh and the detectives must find the person responsible before the whole thing turns into a big international scandal and, possibly, a war.
  - The Case of the Sober Buffoons ("Дело Трезвых Скоморохов", 2004) - Girls begin to turn up missing in the tsardom. All clues point to a travelling circus. As Mladshiy Leytenant Ivashov investigates the circus, several characters enter the scene to complicate the case: a comic-book hero, a familiar young woman, and an old enemy who seeks to make open war on the tsardom.
  - Detectives on Vacation ("Опергруппа в Деревне", 2006) - Tsar Gorokh sends the detectives to the countryside to rest after their last case. However, strange persons are after Ivashov, allegedly working for the greatest criminal mastermind in all the world - Koschei the Deathless.
  - To Marry and Neutralize ("Жениться и обезвредить", 2009) The detectives finally return home after their vacation, only to encounter new problems in the capital, the tsar has turned Japanese, Ivashov's bride-to-be will arrive any minute, and a new threat to take over the tsardom has taken root.
  - Tsar Gorokh's Rusty Sword ("Ржавый меч царя Гороха", 2014) During a relatively quiet period, Nikita reminisces about an old case that, chronologically, took place between The Plot of the Black Mass and The Flying Ship. The Tsar's cousin has returned from a convent and expresses her desire to get married. By Russian tradition, the Tsar has to hand over half of the tsardom to her future husband, so the choice needs to be well thought out.
  - Tsar Koschei's Black Sword ("Чёрный меч царя Кощея", 2015) A mysterious force kidnaps the Tsarina, Mit'ka's fiancée, and Nikita's wife. Worse, Koschei is dead, Baba Yaga has fallen for a suspect, and Mit'ka has become a Gray Wolf with the same strength and irrepressible imagination.
  - The Dead Must Be Taken Alive ("Взять живым мёртвого", 2017) It seems Baba Yaga's criminal past has caught up to her. The European nations demand that she be handed over to be tried for the alleged murder of Prince Johann. The entire team heads to Europe to prove her innocence.
- My Wife Is a Witch ("Моя Жена - Ведьма")
  - My Wife Is a Witch ("Моя Жена - Ведьма", 1999) - Sergey is a poet who finds out that the librarian he recently married is descended from a long line of witches. After he burns a lock of wolf fur he finds in his wife's hair, she vanishes. Along with his personal angel and devil, Sergey must go into the realms of magic to find his wife and discover an ancient prophecy involving him. The novel makes a point that not everything "other" is necessarily "evil".
  - The Little Sister from Hell ("Сестрёнка из Преисподней", 2001) - when Sergey's wife's cousin comes to visit them, he finds that she is dressed and behaves like Sailor Moon. Things turn for the worse when she disappears after touching his wife's amulet. Sergey, his wife, his angel, and his devil must once again travel to the magical worlds to find the girl, who, apparently, gains the powers of the above-mentioned cartoon character. They must find who is behind this transformation and what that person plans to do with her.
- The Thief of Baghdad ("Багдадский Вор", 2002)
  - The Thief of Baghdad - Andrei Belyanin retells the story of a friend of his who describes how he was sent to ancient Baghdad by a genie to become the famous Thief of Baghdad. He loses all his memories, but has one goal, to somehow put an end to the Emir's tyranny, and somehow stay alive himself.
  - The Shamer of Shaitan ("Посрамитель Шайтана", 2006) - Belyanin continues the story, as the Thief of Baghdad returns to Ancient Arabia to continue his adventures in other cities. This time, he must face Shaitan himself.
- Professional Werewolf ("Профессиональный Оборотень") — co-authored by Galina Chornaya.
  - Professional Werewolf ("Профессиональный Оборотень", 2002) - Life was normal for a young female college student. Everything changed the night she was bitten by a werewolf in an alley. She was taken in by a duo of agents (a man and a talking cat) from the future, who travel to different time periods stopping evil creatures from gaining foothold. They persuade her to join them until they can find a cure for her condition, before she fully turns into a werewolf.
  - Werewolves' Vacation ("Каникулы Оборотней", 2003)
  - Werewolves' Chronicles ("Хроники Оборотней", 2004)
  - The Return of the Werewolves ("Возвращение Оборотней", 2007)
  - Werewolves' Stories ("Истории Оборотней", 2009)
- Cossack ("Казак")
  - Cossack in Heaven ("Казак в Раю", 2005) - a modern-day man dressed as a cossack is hit by a car. At the same moment, a suicide bomber kills a female soldier in Israel. Both find themselves in what they believe to be Heaven. They soon find out that afterlife may not be same as what they were taught since childhood.
  - Cossack in Hell ("Казак в Аду", 2008)
- Aargh ("Ааргх", 2007)
  - Aargh ("Ааргх", 2007)
  - Aargh in the elf-nursery ("Ааргх в эльфятнике", 2007)
  - Aargh on the throne ("Ааргх на троне", 2007)

==== Single books ====
- The Redheaded Knight ("Рыжий Рыцарь", 2000) - a medieval knight travelling to the Holy Lands to join his king in a Crusade gets kidnapped by an evil witch and sent to modern-day Russia. He encounters a teenage girl, who, at first, doesn't take him seriously. However, when strange creatures begin to attack them, she changes her mind. The two, along with the girl's gay friend, embark on an incredible adventure to find and put an end to an ancient evil kingdom that was trapped in time by the forces of good. Their adventures will take them to times both past and future, unknowingly fulfilling a prophecy spelling an end for the witch.
- Taste of the Vampire ("Вкус Вампира", 2003) – vampires?! Imagination quickly draws a pale infernal creature with bloodred lips and... well, the avant-garde artist Dan Titovsky from Astrakhan is not at all like that. He is an energy vampire who feeds on the "silver feelings of trusting girls." Despite the long trail of broken hearts, he has a long attachment - a mostly harmless female member of the local Shadowless Clan. She is the magnificent vamp Sabrina von Strastenberg. It is she who is the target of the pointing finger of Destiny. The stormclouds are gathering above her in the person of the irreconcilable warrior - the green-eyed threat to vampires Eve Lopatkova, who stepped on the hunting path as per the task given to her by the secret Hound Order.
- The Hunt for the Hussar ("Охота на Гусара", 2004)

=== Short stories ===
- Cossacks' Fairy Tales ("Казачьи сказки", 2006)
- Diary of Cat with Lemonade Name ("Дневник кота с лимонадным именем", 2007)
- The Wishes of Demons ("Чего хотят демоны", 2008)

=== Fairy tales ===
- Red and Striped ("Рыжий и Полосатый") series
  - Red and Striped ("Рыжий и Полосатый", 2000) - a children's story about two kittens born on the same day to two different families but share the same taste for adventure.
  - The Return of Red and Striped ("Возвращение Рыжего и Полосатого", 2000)
- The Order of Porcelain Knights ("Орден Фарфоровых Рыцарей", 2000)

=== Verses ===
- Bear Guard ("Пастух медведей", 2003)

=== Translations into Russian and editions ===
- Khristo Poshtakov. Sword, Might and Magic ("Меч, Магия и Челюсти", 2005) – a down-on-his-luck knight attempts to impress a princess by killing a local dragon. To this end, he enlists the help of a half-educated wizard. The dragon turns out to be just like them - a loser who can barely find food. The wizard attempts to cast a spell, but it goes awry and sends them to modern-day Hollywood, where the three are forced to live.
- Khristo Poshtakov. The Conquest of America ("Гаси Америку!", 2009)
- Andrzej Pilipiuk. Jakub Wędrowycz ("Якуб Вендерович", 2006–2007) series
- Karen Mahony & Alex Ukolov. Shadow of the Vampuss ("Тень кота-вампира", 2007)
