= Szewc z Lichtenrade =

Collection of short stories by Andrzej Pilipiuk

- Author: Andrzej Pilipiuk
- Language: Polish
- Genre: speculative fiction
- Publisher: Fabryka Słów
- Publication date: 2012
- Publication place: Poland
- Preceded by: Aparatus
- Followed by: Carska manierka

Szewc z Lichtenrade (The Cobbler from Lichtenrade) is a collection of short stories published in November 2012 by Andrzej Pilipiuk. The collection is considered volume 5 of the Światy Pilipiuka (Worlds of Pilipiuk) series published by Fabryka Słów.

The book includes 10 stories, each serving as a separate chapter, including the titular story, Szewc z Lichtenrade.

The stories in the anthology are not connected chronologically or thematically, but sometimes they are linked by recurring characters – including Dr. Paweł Skórzewski, historian-antiquarian Robert Storm, and archaeologist Tomasz Olszakowski (partially, an alter ego of the author himself). These characters also appear in other collections of short stories by Andrzej Pilipiuk. The stories cover historical events related to Poland, as well as associated legends and ancient beliefs.

The book received a range of reviews in the year of its publication. Reviews were generally positive, though there was no consensus among reviewers regarding the assessment of individual stories.

== Plot ==
In the story Wunderwaffe, an alternative post-war Berlin is depicted where Adolf Hitler and Hermann Göring are homeless in a shelter, and Josef Mengele is a morphine dealer supplying them, pursued by a rival Jewish mafia.

In Traktat o higienie (Treatise on Hygiene), which references positivist models, the protagonist is Dr. Paweł Skórzewski, known from earlier stories by the author. The plot describes the lice treatment of peasants in the Zamoyski family entail.

Ślady stóp w wykopie (Tracks in the Excavation) features antiquarian Storm and archaeologist Olszakowski and portrays the fate of archaeological excavations in a city park.

Parowóz (The Locomotive) concerns a journalistic investigation related to a suspicious series of deaths among rural populations and also includes a parallel world motif.

In Ludzie, którzy wiedzą (People Who Know), antiquarian Storm reappears, this time running an antique shop in a small town.

W okularze stereoskopu (In the Stereoscope) is set in the 1980s, with the main character being a young teenager who helps his elderly, sick neighbor with daily tasks, such as picking up a repaired backpack from a craftsman. The plot centers around a mystery: why does the elderly person, who moves with crutches, need a cake and provisions for a trip?

Yeti ciągną na zachód (Yeti Head West) sees Storm again, this time exploring the mystery of a mysterious photograph and a related organization – the pre-war Institute of Cryptozoology, where experiments on yetis may have been conducted.

Sekret Wyspy Niedźwiedziej (The Secret of Bear Island) is another story featuring Dr. Skórzewski, who participates in an expedition to the far North because the Russian tsar's brother has commissioned him to find a unique species of goose.

In Świątynia (The Temple), the plot revolves around archaeological excavations and the conflict between archaeologists and local administration.

In the final story, Szewc z Lichtenrade (The Cobbler from Lichtenrade), the protagonist is the well-known Storm, searching for historical shoemaking tools. The action takes place in Berlin, where Storm is tracing a Nazi war criminal.

== Reception ==
The book was reviewed by Krzysztof Cieślik for Polityka magazine. He noted that the book will not surprise those already familiar with the author's work. Positively, he mentioned that Pilipiuk... creates gripping texts enriched with a substantial amount of historical knowledge, often leaning more towards realistic prose than speculative fiction and that some texts are less convincing, others more so, but almost all provide a solid dose of entertainment and humor. Cieślik considered Wunderwaffe the weakest story in the collection.

For the zine Esensja, Agnieszka Szady reviewed the book, observing that the collection lacks much speculative fiction and action, being mostly composed of nostalgic tales and outlines of plots rather than well-developed stories. She found the collection interesting for both new and old readers. According to the reviewer, the quality of the collection is quite uneven; she considered the titular story and Sekret Wyspy Niedźwiedziej the best. She praised the former for its intriguing and well-written narrative with a neat ending, and the latter for its engaging plot, neatly closed with a compositional frame, carefully dosed information, and an explosive (in the literal sense) punchline. She also praised Parowóz for combining a grim mood with good humor, though she viewed it as almost a sketch, and criticized Ludzie, którzy wiedzą for a weak ending and Świątynia for being overwhelmed with details on iron smelting using ancient methods. While praising the successful ending of Yeti ciągną na zachód, she criticized the political allusions as humor at the level of a graffiti in an outhouse (similarly negative remarks were made about the humor in the titular Szewc z Lichtenrade). She also considered Traktat o higienie and Ślady stóp w wykopie among the weaker stories in the collection.

For the zine Fahrenheit, Jagna Rolska reviewed the collection, considering the volume worth recommending with a consistent and high level of stories, and identifying Sekret Wyspy Niedźwiedziej as the best (Surprising. Excellent and atmospheric). The reviewer also praised the titular Szewc z Lichtenrade for its masterfully conducted narrative and the intriguing topic of wartime fates of Warsaw shoemakers, as well as W okularze stereoskopu.

For the Poltergeist portal, a reviewer using the pseudonym Camillo evaluated the collection as containing moderately interesting and quasi-fantastical stories, writing that it is neither a gem nor a masterpiece, but it fulfills the playful and 'time-killing' role of literature. The reviewer praised Traktat o higienie and Wunderwaffe as short, concise pieces distinguished by unforced situational humor and amusing dialogues, but found the rest of the stories in the collection lacking originality and distinctiveness. Ludzie, którzy wiedzą and Ślady stóp w wykopie were criticized as a patchwork of genre scenes, lacking a clear plot axis and meaningful plot development, with elements of speculative fiction forcefully inserted. Sekret Wyspy Niedźwiedziej and W okularze stereoskopu were criticized for narrative imperfections (respectively, being overwhelmed by too many secondary characters, and having low emotional impact, though good in other respects), while the rest of the stories were deemed to not stand out in any special way.

An anonymous reviewer for Onet.pl also reviewed the book, writing that the stories in the collection are full of extraordinary ideas and absurd humor. The reviewer noted that the author repeats motifs from his earlier work (criticism of Nazism, communism, and mass production), and found constant marveling at the ear of a century-old cup or a bent belt buckle tiresome, but praised the stories, writing that the author still has no shortage of ideas and that the punchlines always surprise.

Paweł Dunin-Wąsowicz, in a review for the magazine Lampa, positively addressed the book, writing that Pilipiuk's short story collections are stronger than his novels and that despite some shortcomings in the collection, he awaits the sixth volume of the series. However, he criticized some historical and stylistic errors, such as incorrect terminology regarding Jewish ghettos and an excessive number of characters with the same name.
