= Czerwona gorączka =

Collection of short stories by Andrzej Pilipiuk

- Author: Andrzej Pilipiuk
- Language: Polish
- Genre: fantasy
- Publisher: Fabryka Słów
- Publication date: 2007
- Publication place: Poland
- Preceded by: 2586 kroków
- Followed by: Rzeźnik drzew

Czerwona gorączka (Red Fever) is a collection of eleven short stories by Andrzej Pilipiuk. It is the author's second volume of short stories and the second volume in the Światy Pilipiuka (Worlds of Pilipiuk) series.

The collection consists of the following stories: Czerwona Gorączka (Red Fever), Grucha (Pear), Błękitny Trąd (Blue Leprosy), Silnik z Łomży (The Engine from Łomża), Zeppelin L59/2, Wujaszek Igor (Uncle Igor), Po drugiej stronie (On the Other Side), Gdzie diabeł mówi dobranoc (Where the Devil Says Goodnight), Piórko w żywopłocie (A Feather in the Hedge), Operacja Szynka (Operation Ham), Samolot von Ribbentropa (Von Ribbentrop's Plane). Some of them had been previously published. The stories in this volume are not connected by plot, although some of them reference threads from Pilipiuk's earlier collection, 2586 kroków (2,586 Steps).

== Plot ==
In Czerwona gorączka, the main character is Doctor Paweł Skórzewski, who also appears in two stories from the collection 2586 kroków. The action takes place during the October Revolution in post-revolutionary Petrograd, now under communist rule, where Skórzewski meets Felix Dzerzhinsky, searches for a serial killer, and investigates the titular "red fever", which is connected to the hypothesis that the revolutionary events have a disease-related origin.

Samolot von Ribbentropa takes place in the same alternate history as Atomowa ruletka (Atomic Roulette) from the previous collection. The story depicts Poland as a global superpower, the victor of World War II, and the country responsible for the atomic bombing of Berlin during the war. Its protagonist is an investigative journalist researching the circumstances surrounding the interception of the titular airplane.

The story Gdzie diabeł mówi dobranoc presents a depiction of Europe (including Poland) controlled by Islamists (with Poland being the Sheikhdom of Lechistan), described through the perspective of two American businessmen visiting the country.

Zeppelin L59/2 combines the theme of time warps (parallel worlds and alternate histories) with a journey to Africa on a restored zeppelin with a Polish-German crew, descendants of the original crew of the airship.

Wujaszek Igor is the story of a train engineer – formerly a Siberian exile – and an ambitious Secret Police officer in 1953, investigating the phenomenon of a ghost train spreading fear among communist officials in post-war Poland. This train carries the coffin of Józef Piłsudski, whose spirit, once summoned, also appears in the story.

Po drugiej stronie is the story of an antique collector who exists in two parallel worlds.

In Piórko w żywopłocie, aliens appear, and a CIA agent of Polish descent investigates the phenomenon of temporally appearing "enclaves" of another reality. The story is written in two timelines, depicting the protagonist's childhood and his contemporary adventures.

The protagonist of Operacja Szynka is an archaeologist named Tomasz Olszakowski, who travels through time to save Christmas and, in the process, patch the budget gap – by turning mammoths into ham.

Silnik z Łomży is a humorous tale about a tabloid reporter investigating unexplained phenomena, which some reviewers suggest is inspired by the work of Konrad T. Lewandowski.

Błękitny trąd is an unusual fantasy for the author, featuring dwarves. The protagonists are convicts investigating a mysterious epidemic and a genocidal conspiracy.

Grucha is a satire about the injustices of the educational system.

== Reception ==
Jarosław Machura reviewed the book positively for the Histmag portal, calling Pilipiuk a celebrator of Polishness in the most patriotic sense. He considered Samolot von Ribbentropa the best story, praising it for depicting a powerful, globally significant Poland that even Uncle Sam's powerful homeland fears. Po drugiej stronie was also noted as one of the better stories. Machura criticized Piórko w żywopłocie as having a poorly utilized idea and observed that Pilipiuk often displays his beliefs and views on the existing government in a sometimes overly blatant manner.

Michał Kubalski reviewed the collection for the zine Esensja. He appreciated the anthology overall, noting it was a volume full of decent reads but criticized the literary recycling, pointing out repeated themes and scenes. He found Zeppelin L59/2 weak due to its sudden and senseless ending and similarly criticized Piórko w żywopłocie. He found Gdzie diabeł mówi dobranoc to be an unconvincing world and Samolot von Ribbentropa as jingoistic. He described Błękitny trąd as surprisingly reminiscent of the comic Thorgal. However, he praised Operacja Szynka as unrealistic but amusing and deemed Wujaszek Igor the best story in the collection.

Piotr Brewczyński and Michał Smętek reviewed the anthology for the Poltergeist portal. Brewczyński rated the book positively as a collection of generally equal and interesting stories but considered Czerwona gorączka the worst due to its most contrived and naive nature. He also criticized Grucha as predictable and not of the highest quality but praised Zeppelin L-59/2 for its very atmospheric feel and Po drugiej stronie as the best for being excellent, surprising, and shocking. Samolot von Ribbentropa was seen as an extremely engaging journalistic investigation.

Krzysztof Księski reviewed the volume for Paradoks, calling it a very good collection with some average texts. He found Grucha and Piórko w żywopłocie as the weakest, noting their lackluster endings. He praised Zeppelin L59/2 and Po drugiej stronie for their intriguing narratives and Czerwona gorączka for its very interesting concept. He also commended Błękitny trąd, Silnik z Łomży, and Wujaszek Igor.

Adam Szymonowicz reviewed the anthology for the Katedra portal, calling it a generally successful mix of good stories but lacking a standout piece. He criticized Czerwona gorączka and Piórko w żywopłocie for being among the weaker stories due to their predictable and less engaging content. He found Silnik z Łomży a satire on today's tabloids and praised Po drugiej stronie, Gdzie diabeł mówi dobranoc, and Samolot von Ribbentropa for their engaging and imaginative content.

Paweł Dunin-Wąsowicz reviewed the book for the Lampa magazine, highlighting the author's original concepts and historical passion. He found the collection uneven, criticizing Grucha and Po drugiej stronie as written with the left hand. He praised Gdzie diabeł mówi dobranoc as political fiction, Piórko w żywopłocie for its evocative description, and Silnik z Łomży as a humorous tale. He criticized the author's language and noted an intrusive anti-communism, but praised the book's attractive edition with features like faux Russian stamps and red-dusted edges.

== Adaptations ==
In 2020, the titular story was adapted into a theater production directed by Michał Białecki and Piotr Zawadzki. In 2021, it was adapted into a television film on Telewizja Republika, directed by Krzysztof Prus.
