= Belyanin =

Belyanin, feminine Belyaniana is a Russian surname. Notable people with the surname include:

- Andrei Belyanin, Russian science fiction and fantasy writer
- Boris Belyanin (1907-1991) - Soviet scientist in the field of aerodynamics
- Tatyana Belyanina, taxonomic authority on fish
- Vitaly Belyanin, underground alias of Vitaly Bianki (1894–1959), Russian children's writer and an author of books on nature
- Valery Belyanin (musician) (1953–2016),Russian musician and songwriter
- Valery Belyanin (psycholinguist) (born 1965), Russian psycholinguist and psychoterapist
