= Zbigniew Nienacki =

Polish writer (1929–1994)

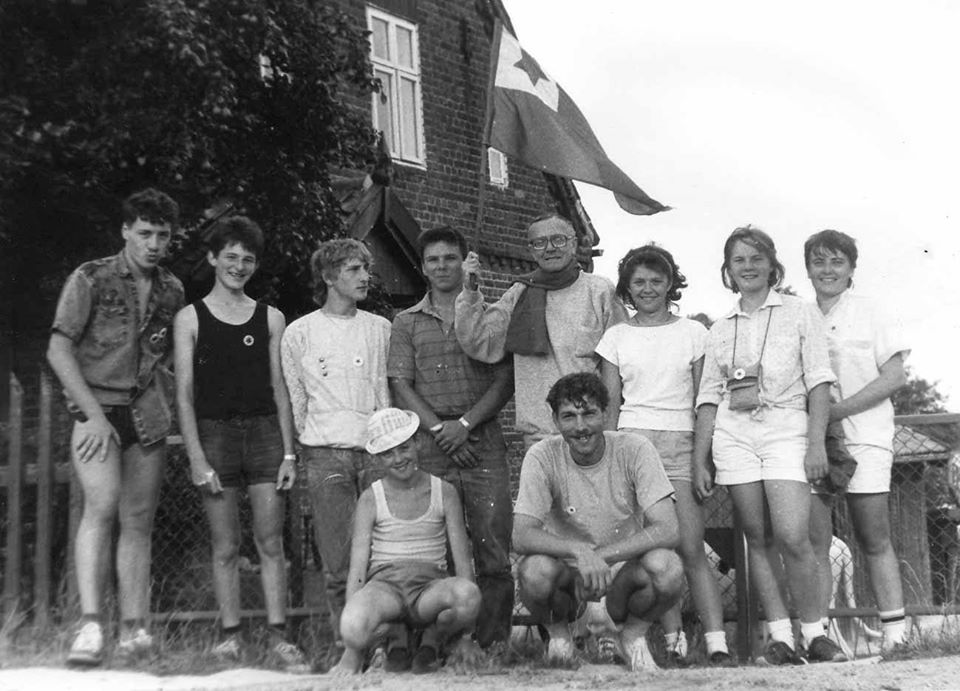
- Nienacki (fifth from left) in 1991
- Born: Zbigniew Tomasz Nowicki; 1 January 1929; Łódź, Poland
- Died: 23 September 1994 (aged 65); Morąg, Poland
- Occupations: writer; journalist
- Writing career
- Notable work: Pan Samochodzik series

Zbigniew Nienacki (Polish: [ˈzbiɡɲɛf ɲɛˈnat͡skʲi]; January 1, 1929 in Łódź – September 23, 1994 in Morąg) was a pen name of Polish writer, Zbigniew Tomasz Nowicki. He was most known for his popular Pan Samochodzik (Mister Automobile) series of adventure novels.

== Biography ==
His works consist of adventure stories aimed at teenagers as well as adult novels. He achieved his greatest acclaim for his Pan Samochodzik series, a sequence of historical detective stories centering on a museum employee and his fantastic automobile (samochodzik means a little car in Polish). The works Uwodziciel, Raz w roku w Skiroławkach, Wielki Las, and Dagome Iudex contain erotic themes, especially erotic fantasies, that caused some controversy in Poland, especially Raz w roku w Skirolawkach was strongly criticised by the Communist Poland's media. Series Dagome Iudex is, outside erotica, is an attempt to weave Polish Piast history and Slavic, Norse and folk traditions into the historical adult novel, where main character is every bit like Machiavelli's Prince.

Aside from being forcibly relocated during World War II and his brief studies in cinematography in Moscow, he spent most of his life until 1967 in Łódź. In 1967 he moved to Masuria (Polish: Mazury), a lake filled region in northeastern Poland, where he remained until his death. Mazury are sometimes the setting for Pan Samochodzik and feature in some of his other works.

In 1962 he joined Polish United Workers' Party.

== Works ==
=== Pan Samochodzik Series ===
Note: The dates of the following novels may be inaccurate, as some of them may have been published in a different order than they were written.

- Uroczysko (new title: Pan Samochodzik i święty relikwiarz) (1957)
- Skarb Atanaryka (new title: Pan Samochodzik i skarb Atanaryka) (1960)
- Pozwolenie na przywóz lwa (new title: Pierwsza przygoda Pana Samochodzika) (1961)
- Wyspa Złoczyńców (new title: Pan Samochodzik i Wyspa Złoczyńców) (1964)
- Pan Samochodzik i templariusze (1966)
- Księga strachów (new title: Pan Samochodzik i dziwne szachownice) (1967)
- Niesamowity dwór (new title: Pan Samochodzik i niesamowity dwór (1970)
- Nowe przygody Pana Samochodzika (new title: Pan Samochodzik i Kapitan Nemo) (1970)
- Pan Samochodzik i zagadki Fromborka (1972)
- Pan Samochodzik i Fantomas (1973)
- Pan Samochodzik i tajemnica tajemnic (1975)
- Pan Samochodzik i Winnetou (1976)
- Pan Samochodzik i Niewidzialni (1977)
- Pan Samochodzik i złota rękawica (1979)
- Pan Samochodzik i człowiek z UFO (new title: Pan Samochodzik i Nieśmiertelny) (1985)
- Pan Samochodzik i nieuchwytny kolekcjoner (1997) (Only partially written, completed by Jerzy Ignaciuk)

=== Other Novels ===
- Worek Judaszuw (1961)
- Podniesienie (1963)
- Laseczka i tajemnica (1963)
- Z głębokości (1964)
- Sumienie (1965)
- Liście dębu (vol. 1 - 1967, vol. 2 - 1969)
- Mężczyzna czterdziestoletni (1971)
- Uwodziciel (1978)
- Raz w roku w Skiroławkach (vol. 1 and 2 - 1983)
- Wielki las (1987)
- Dagome ludex (albo published as Historia sekretna) (vol. 1 & 2 - 1989, vol. 3 - 1990)

=== Plays ===
- Termitiera (1962)
- Golem (1963)
- Styks (1963–1966)
- Opowieść o Bielinku (1966)

== Accolades ==
- Medal of the 10th Anniversary of People's Poland (19 January 1955)
