= Church of Our Lady of Kazan and Saint Elijah, Wojsławice =

Orthodox church in Wojsławice, Poland

Church of Our Lady of Kazan and Saint Elijah
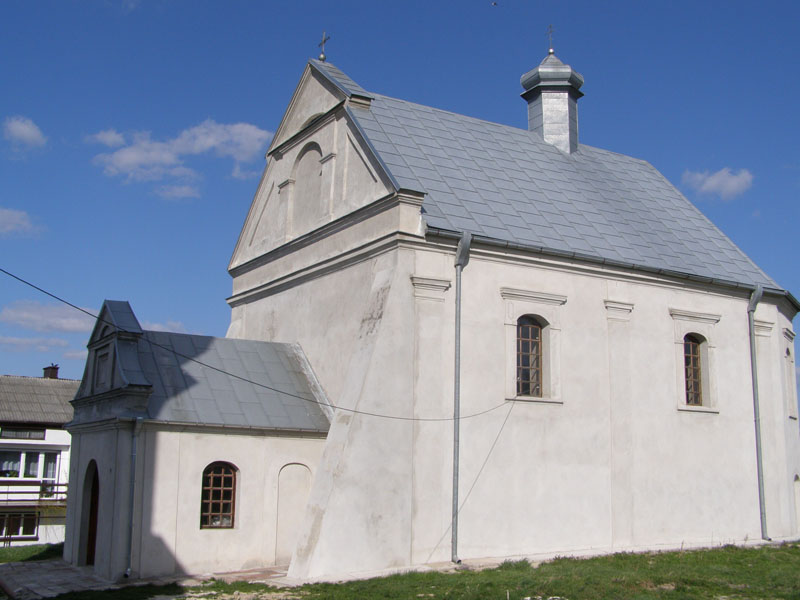
- General view of the church
- Church of Our Lady of Kazan and Saint Elijah
- 50°55′11.2″N 23°33′02.6″E
- Location: Wojsławice
- Country: Poland
- Denomination: Eastern Orthodoxy
- Churchmanship: Polish Orthodox Church

History
- Status: active Orthodox church
- Dedication: Our Lady of Kazan; Elijah

Architecture
- Style: Baroque
- Completed: 1771

Specifications
- Materials: brick

Administration
- Diocese: Diocese of Lublin and Chełm

The Church of Our Lady of Kazan and Saint Elijah is an Orthodox filial church in Wojsławice. It belongs to the Parish of St. John the Theologian in Chełm, within the Chełm Deanery of the Diocese of Lublin and Chełm of the Polish Orthodox Church.

Orthodox churches have existed in Wojsławice since the town's founding in the 15th century. The present building was constructed in the Baroque style between 1771 and 1774 as a Uniate church. It became an Orthodox parish church during the Conversion of Chełm Eparchy. The Wojsławice parish remained active until the expulsion of the local Ukrainian Orthodox population in the 1940s, when it was closed due to a lack of worshippers. The abandoned church, used as a warehouse, gradually fell into ruin. It was only at the turn of the 20th and 21st centuries that it was renovated, but the absence of an Orthodox community in the town means it is only opened for religious services occasionally. The church has no iconostasis, and the only preserved piece of its original furnishings is a historic thurible.

== History ==
=== First churches in Wojsławice ===
The first church in Wojsławice was mentioned in the town's founding charter around 1440. It was dedicated to St. Elijah. This wooden structure was likely destroyed during a Tatar raid. Another church with the same dedication was built before 1508. By the 16th century, Wojsławice had three Orthodox churches serving a congregation of 2,600 people. A monastery operated alongside St. Elijah's Church.

=== 1771 church ===
The present church in Wojsławice was constructed between 1771 and 1774 in the Baroque style. It was funded by Marianna of the Daniłowicz family. Originally built as a Uniate church, it had a masonry structure, except for the wooden church porch. In 1841, the church porch was rebuilt in brick, making the entire church a masonry structure.

The church remained the seat of a Uniate parish until the Conversion of Chełm Eparchy. In 1874, a year before the formal liquidation of the diocese, the Wojsławice parish was incorporated into the Chełm Vicariate of the Orthodox Eparchy of Chełm and Warsaw. In 1880, a series of frescoes by Michał Olechwier was added to the interior. The church underwent renovations in the following decade. A brick bell tower was built next to it before World War I.

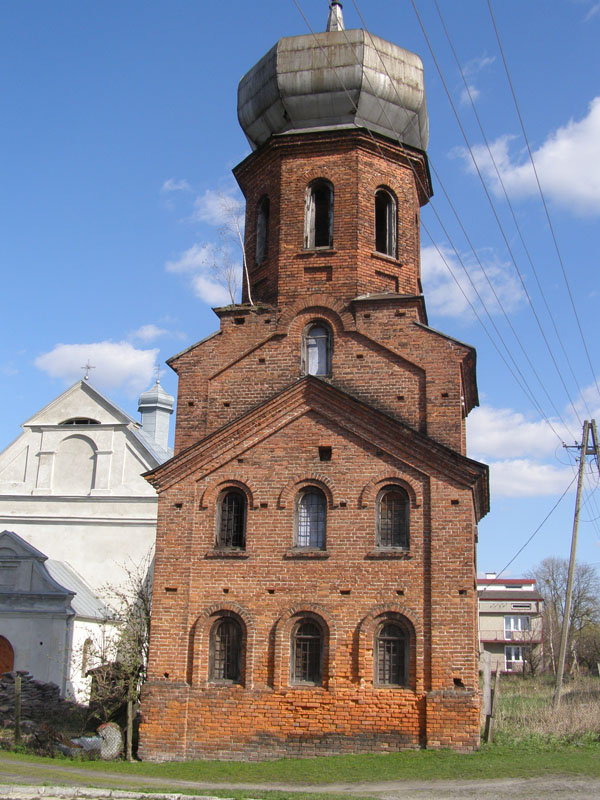
Bell tower next to the church

After Poland regained independence, the church in Wojsławice was legally recognized as an active Orthodox parish from the beginning. In 1919, the Ministry of Religious Affairs and Public Education included it on the list of churches designated for reopening. By mid-1921, an Orthodox parish was already operating in Wojsławice as one of 14 pastoral centers within the Chełm Deanery of the Diocese of Warsaw and Chełm and one of 13 Orthodox churches in Chełm County.

=== After World War II ===
The church in Wojsławice remained in use until the 1940s, when the local Orthodox Ukrainian population was deported, and the building ceased to serve its religious function. The church's entire furnishings were taken from Wojsławice by an Orthodox priest.

The abandoned church was repurposed as a storage facility for chemical substances and later for fuel and lubricants. The stored chemicals caused severe damage to the historic frescoes. During this period, the fence surrounding the church grounds and the Orthodox cemetery was also destroyed. The lower level of the bell tower was converted into a store and later into a waiting room for the state bus service before being entirely abandoned.

From the 1960s, the church was used as a museum storage facility. However, this did not improve its condition, and the remaining frescoes continued to deteriorate. In the 1980s, local authorities became interested in restoring the deteriorating church and planned to reopen it for religious use by 1990. However, restoration efforts did not begin until the 1990s and were soon halted due to a lack of funding. Poorly executed renovation attempts ultimately destroyed Olechwier's frescoes, and the plaster was removed from the walls. In the 1990s, the church began to be referred to as the Church of Our Lady of Kazan, a dedication previously held by a wooden Orthodox chapel on Grabowiecka Street that was destroyed in 1938. A successful renovation was finally carried out in the early 21st century under the initiative of the Orthodox Diocese of Lublin and Chełm. Between 2007 and 2009, the building hosted several concerts.

In 2009, for the first time since 1944, a religious service – a Great Vespers – was held in the church as part of the Three Cultures Festival organized by the Wojsławice Enthusiasts' Association. Since then, such services have been conducted annually during the festival. In 2012, the first Divine Liturgy since the wartime deportations was celebrated in Wojsławice. However, as there are no longer any Orthodox residents in the town, religious services are held only on special occasions.

== Architecture ==
The church in Wojsławice was built of brick in the Baroque style. It features a church porch, a single nave, a chancel with a polygonal termination, and a sacristy. The matroneum inside the church is supported by two brick pillars. The exterior walls are divided by Tuscan pilasters that support a profiled cornice. The church is covered with a sheet metal roof, crowned with an onion-shaped dome. Before World War II, the church's façade was adorned with images of St. Nicholas, St. Elijah, and the Mother of God – modeled on Viktor Vasnetsov's composition from St Volodymyr's Cathedral in Kyiv. The façade also featured Church Slavonic inscriptions: Błagosłowien griadyj wo imia Gospodnie (Blessed is he who comes in the name of the Lord) and Oswiati lubiaszczych błagolepije domu Twojego (Sanctify those who love the splendor of Your house).

Before its closure following the deportation of its parishioners, the church housed a four-tiered iconostasis. Since its removal, no replacement has been installed. There were also two icon cases displayed before the iconostasis – one containing an image of Christ the Savior and the other holding a copy of the Chełm Icon of the Mother of God. The only surviving piece of the church's original furnishings is a thurible. Individual icons originally kept in the church are occasionally returned to it on days when services are held in Wojsławice. During the fourth edition of the Three Cultures Festival in 2012, the church displayed a copy of an icon of St. Nicholas from one of the former churches in Wojsławice.

The church was added to the register of historical monuments on 31 January 1970 under the number A/478.
