= Aparatus =

Collection of short stories by Andrzej Pilipiuk

- Author: Andrzej Pilipiuk
- Language: Polish
- Genre: speculative fiction
- Publisher: Fabryka Słów
- Publication date: 2011
- Publication place: Poland
- Preceded by: Rzeźnik drzew
- Followed by: The Cobbler from Lichtenrade

Aparatus is a collection of short stories by Andrzej Pilipiuk. It was published in November 2011.

The collection consists of eight stories, among them is the titular story, Aparatus. Others include Choroba białego człowieka (The White Man's Disease), Dzwon Wolności (The Liberty Bell), Księgi drzewne (The Wooden Books), Ostatni biskup (The Last Bishop), Ośla opowieść (The Donkey's Tale), Staw (The Pond), and Za kordonem. Lwów (Beyond the Border: Lviv). Four of the stories are reprints. Illustrations for this edition, including the cover, were done by Daniel Grzeszkiewicz.

While the stories in the collection are not chronologically or narratively linked, they sometimes share main characters – Dr. Paweł Skórzewski or the collector-antiquarian Robert Storm. These characters also appear in other collections by Andrzej Pilipiuk. The collection is considered the fourth volume in the Światy Pilipiuka (The Worlds of Pilipiuk) series, published by Fabryka Słów. The book was reissued in November 2018.

== Plot ==
Three of the stories (Choroba białego człowieka, Dzwon Wolności, and Ostatni biskup) are connected by the character of Dr. Paweł Skórzewski, a Polish doctor from the Russian partition. In Choroba białego człowieka, Skórzewski searches for the lost crew of a research cutter. In Dzwon Wolności, while administering vaccines in Siberia, he stumbles upon a legendary bell whose sound is said to signal the fall of the Tsarist dynasty. In Ostatni biskup, he encounters a sect of Orthodox Christians.

The other three stories are connected by the modern-day Polish collector and antiquarian, Robert Storm. These are Aparatus, Ośla opowieść, and Księgi drzewne. In the title story, Aparatus, Storm tries to solve the mystery of an unusual music box. In Ośla opowieść, he uncovers the secret of the now-extinct Aeolian donkeys. In Księgi drzewne, the protagonist searches for the legendary luthier's spruce tree.

The story Za kordonem. Lwów touches on the topic of the Lwów School of Mathematics. The protagonist is an agent in Lviv, recently occupied by the Russians after the war, searching for a valuable invention (an advanced generator).

The story Staw is set in Nazi-occupied Warsaw (in Łazienki Park) during World War II.

== Reviews ==
Paweł Dunin-Wąsowicz reviewed the book for the magazine Lampa. He classified the collection as weird fiction since half of the stories lack typical speculative fiction elements. He gave a positive review but pointed out some flaws, writing: If one closes their ears to the principled tone of the narrative and squints to blur the thick line the author draws between Bolsheviks and Nazis, one can appreciate the homage the narrator pays to all regionalists, archaeologists, and ethnographers. He particularly praised Ośla opowieść as a beautiful tribute to the author of 'The Adventures of Pinocchio'.

Agnieszka Szady reviewed the book for the zine Esensja. She rated the collection 60% or 80% for fans of the author. Regarding the story Za kordonem. Lwów, she praised the setting (the grim fate of the occupied city) but criticized the plot as treated carelessly. She praised Ośla opowieść for its intriguing solution and noted that most stories about Storm contain very few speculative fiction elements, calling them rather sentimental variations on the charm of bygone objects. She criticized Księgi drzewne for its ending (an unnecessarily added artificial fantastical element). She considered Staw the best story in the collection, writing that it is a horror tale in which Pilipiuk creates an amazing, hypnotic atmosphere with simple means – an atmosphere that even the [heavy] joke at the end cannot spoil.

Krzysztof Księski reviewed the book for the Paradoks portal. He noted that the stories featuring Storm are written from his perspective, in the first person singular. This is a novelty in Pilipiuk's prose and considered Storm an alter ego of the author himself. He found the stories generally interesting, though the twists created by Pilipiuk vary in quality. He praised the collection for its visible love of bygone times and considered it a worthwhile read, though not for everyone – lacking fast-paced action, spectacular heroes, and stunning effects, but instead offering a remarkable journey full of unexplained mysteries and topics that are intriguing and encourage personal exploration.

Michał Gola reviewed the book for the Poltergeist portal. He commented positively on the collection, writing that although the texts contained are not masterpieces, they manage to capture attention, interest, and immerse the reader. And provide a lot of good fun, rating the collection 7 out of 10. He considered Za kordonem. Lwów one of the best stories, praising its atmosphere and action. He praised the titular Aparatus for its mood and wonderful, enchanting nostalgic ending. He also gave positive feedback on Choroba białego człowieka and Dzwon Wolności – as engaging and atmospheric, though he noted that the former is close to horror and emotional, while also criticizing them as not particularly original. He found Księgi drzewne mixed – enjoyable but ruined by an added fantastical element at the end that fit the story like an ox to a cart. He had similar mixed feelings about Staw, describing it as a horror with elements of black humor, occasionally bordering on macabre, praising it as interesting but criticizing the comic elements (exaggerated stereotypes and macabre situational jokes). He criticized Ośla opowieść for its unsurprising ending and negatively assessed Ostatni biskup (as simply boring from start to finish).

Jagna Rolska reviewed the book for Fahrenheit. She considered Staw the best story in the collection, and also positively evaluated Ostatni biskup (though she found it slightly less successful than Staw) and Ośla opowieść as a free and unusual interpretation of a well-known fairy tale. She rated all three stories featuring Skórzewski as definitely good. She praised the prose level (excellent language, as always with Pilipiuk), the plot construction, and the book's graphic design, concluding that the volume is a confirmation of the author's high class and a guarantee of an enjoyable read.

Adam Szymonowicz reviewed the book for the Katedra portal. He positively evaluated it as the most mature work of the author, a testament to his exceptional talent and potential, and the stories as an unforgettable lesson in history. He also noted the stylistic differences between the stories of Skórzewski and Storm – the former being more adventurous, the latter sentimental and leisurely.
