= Rzeźnik drzew =

- First edition
- Author: Andrzej Pilipiuk
- Language: Polish
- Genre: Fantasy
- Publisher: Fabryka Słów
- Publication date: 2009
- Publication place: Poland
- Media type: Print (hardback & paperback)

Rzeźnik drzew is collection of 12 short stories written by Polish fantasy writer Andrzej Pilipiuk. The stories are not related in storyline, however in some stories there is a recurring character from Pilipiuk's works - Dr. Skórzewski. It received reviews at several Polish fantastika portals.
