= Jacek Komuda =

Polish writer and historian (born 1972)

Jacek Lech Komuda
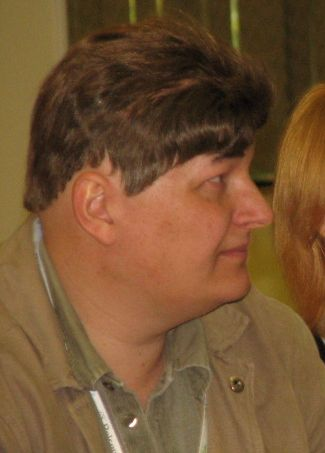
- Komuda at Polcon 2007 in Warsaw
- Born: 23 June 1972 (age 54)
- Occupations: Novelist, historian
- Writing career
- Period: 1999–present
- Genres: Fantasy, history

Jacek Lech Komuda (born 23 June 1972) is a Polish writer and historian. He specialized in the period of the Polish–Lithuanian Commonwealth and History of Poland (1569–1795), and is the author of several novels and short stories of fantasy/historical novel genre. He is a co-author of the Dzikie Pola role-playing game, and script writer for Earth 2160 computer games. He is also an editor of computer game magazine GameStar (Polish edition), and used to contribute to Click! and Komputer Świat GRY magazines.

== Works ==
=== Books ===
- Dzikie Pola roleplaying game
- Opowieści z Dzikich Pól (short story anthology, Alfa 1999, ISBN 83-7179-165-8)
- Wilcze gniazdo (novel, Fabryka Słów 2002, ISBN 83-89011-11-5)
- Opowieści z Dzikich Pól (short story anthology, Fabryka Słów 2004, ISBN 83-89011-46-8)
- Warchoły i pijanice (history book, Fabryka Słów 2004, ISBN 83-89011-40-9)
- Imię Bestii (short story anthology, Fabryka Słów 2005, ISBN 83-89011-73-5)
- Bohun (novel, Fabryka Słów 2006, ISBN 83-60505-08-X)
- Czarna szabla (short story anthology, Fabryka Słów 2007, ISBN 978-83-60505-32-8)
- Diabeł Łańcucki (novel, Fabryka Słów 2007, ISBN 978-83-60505-56-4)
- Galeony wojny (novel, Fabryka Słów 2007, t. 1: ISBN 978-83-60505-75-5, t. 2: ISBN 978-83-60505-88-5)
- Czarna bandera (short story anthology, Fabryka Słów 2008)
- Herezjarcha (short story anthology, Fabryka Słów 2008)
- Samozwaniec Tom I (novel, Fabryka Słów 2009)

=== Short stories ===
- Czarna Cytadela ("Nowa Fantastyka" 5/1991)
- Zapomniana duma ("Fenix" 2/1995)
- Trzech do podziału ("Nowa Fantastyka" 6/1996)
- Wampiry z Odrzykońskiej ("Nowa Fantastyka" 12/1999)
- Tak daleko od nieba ("Nowa Fantastyka" 6/1997 and anthology Robimy rewolucję, Prószyński i S-ka 2000)
- Nobile verbum ("Nowa Fantastyka" 8/2003)
- 36 pięter w dół (anthology Demony, Fabryka Słów 2004)
- Diabeł w kamieniu ("Nowa Fantastyka" 10/2004)

== See also ==
- Andrzej Pilipiuk
