= Wilhelm August Stryowski =

German painter

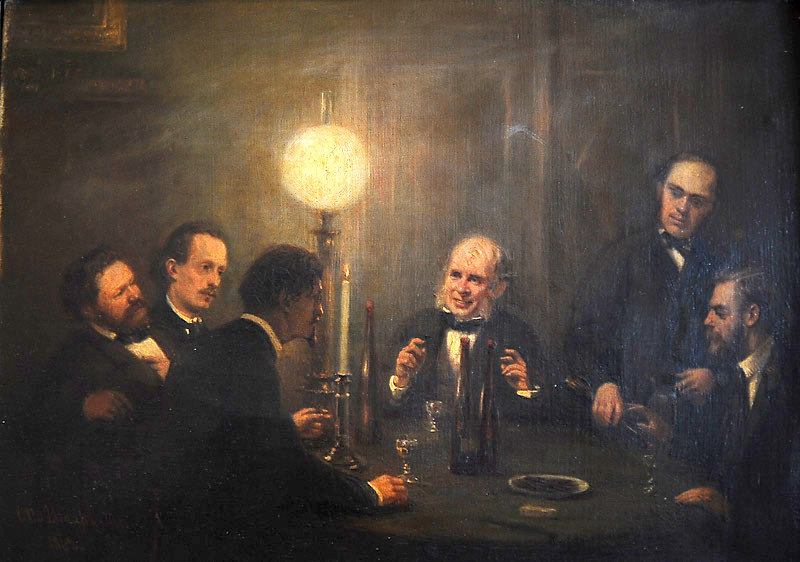
Otto Brausewetter,The evening meeting of painters at the Stoddart in Gdańsk (1862). Stryowski is first on the right side.

Wilhelm August Stryowski (1834–1917) was a Polish-German painter. Born in Gdańsk (Danzig), he studied at the Gdańsk School of Fine Arts. He studied there under Johann Carl Schultz, the school founder and director, and with a scholarship he later studied in Academy of Fine Arts in Düsseldorf. From 1870 to 1873 he was one of creators of the City Museum (now, National Museum in Gdańsk). From 1880 he was art conservator of the museum collection, and from 1887 he was the museum's curator and at the same time – he was a secretary of Association of Friends of Art. From 1873 he lectured in the School of Arts and Artistic Crafts. In 1912, partially paralyzed, he lost command of one hand. He died in Essen in 1917 and was subsequently buried in Gdańsk according to his last will. His wife Clara (née Bädeker, or Baedeker) was a niece of the editor of well-known guide books. Most famous works by W.A.Stryowski depict Gdańsk society – Jews, Romas, workers, prominent citizens. One of the streets in Gdańsk is named after him.

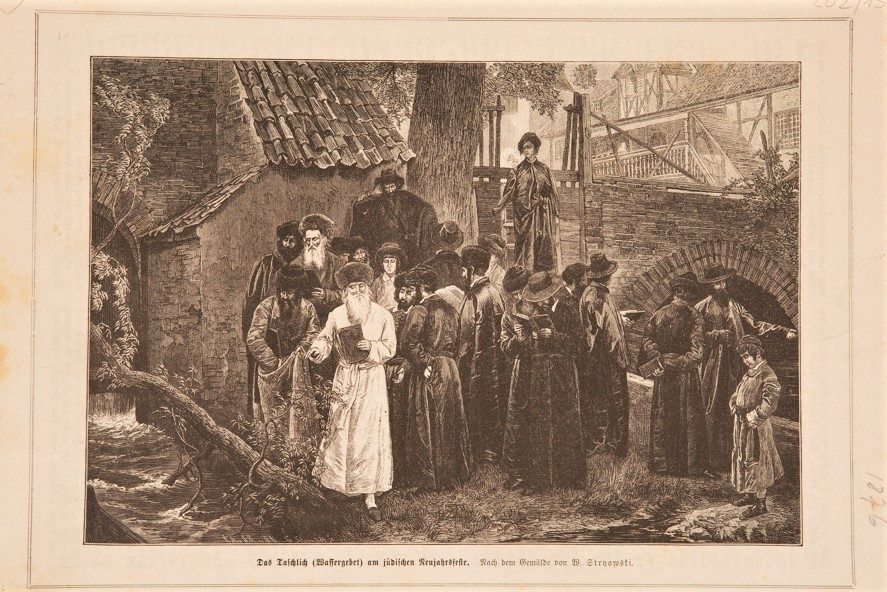
The Tashlich, engraving after a painting by Stryowski, 1876, in the Jewish Museum of Switzerland

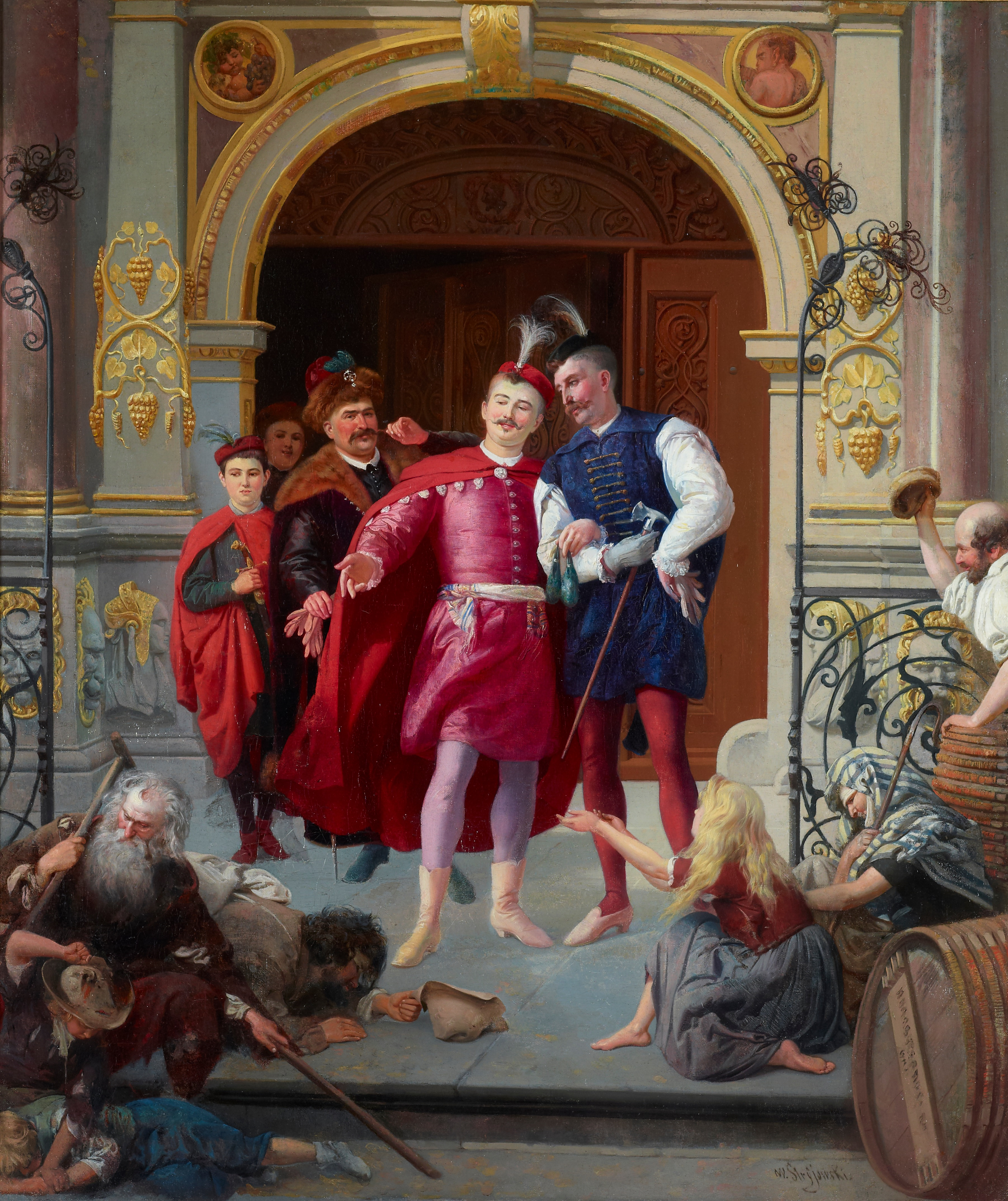
Polish szlachta (nobility) in Gdańsk

== Notes and references ==
- (in Polish) Short bio in Gazeta Wyborcza, 2003
- Stryowski on artnet auctions, New York, NY, USA
- Wilhelm August Stryowski, Flisacy nad Wisłą, 1881, 56x93 cm, oil on canvas, at the National Museum in Gdańsk (in Polish)
