= Jakub Wędrowycz =

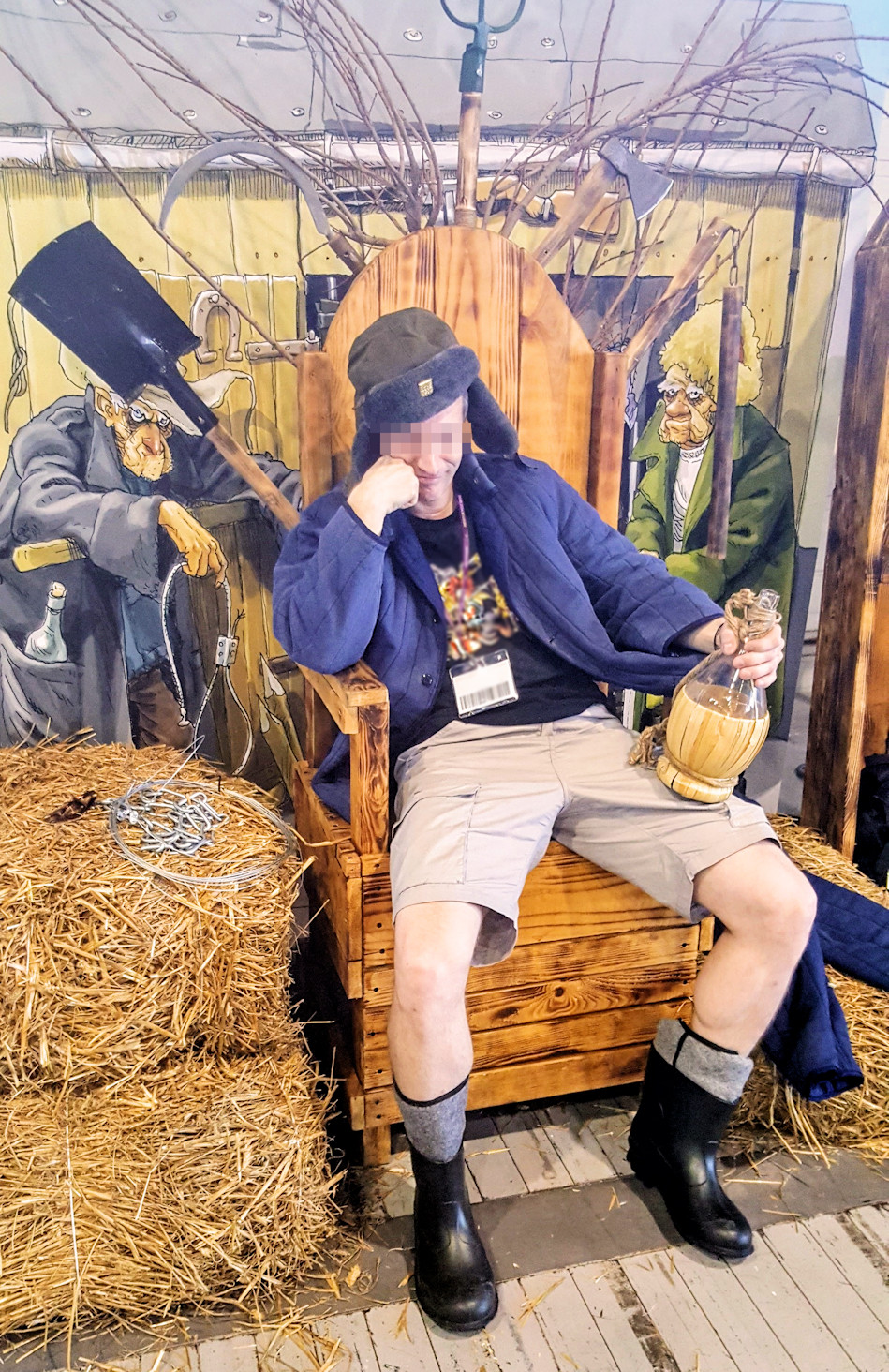
Jakub Wędrowycz cosplayer at Pyrkon 2018

Jakub Wędrowycz [ˈja.kup vɛnˈdrɔ.vʲit͡ʂ] is the protagonist of a number of short stories by Andrzej Pilipiuk, a Polish science fiction and fantasy writer. Wędrowycz is an antihero, an elderly alcoholic, moonshine producer, poacher, amateur exorcist and fighter against all sorts of supernatural forces dwelling around his village, from aliens to vampires, demons and devils, as well as more mundane threats such as Russian mafia, policemen and tax inspectors.

Wędrowycz debuted in a short story published in 1996, and has been featured in dozens of short stories and several book anthologies. With time, Wędrowycz became the most easily recognizable characters of Pilipiuk's speculative fiction and humorous prose, as well as one of the icons of modern Polish pop culture.

Many official illustrations of Wędrowycz, particularly for the books, have been done by Polish illustrator Andrzej Łaski.

== Fictional character biography ==
Wędrowycz lives in Stary Majdan, Gmina Wojsławice, in a rural part of Lublin Voivodeship. Born in the 1900s, he has Ukrainian (Cossack) roots. During his youth in the Russian Empire he finished only three classes of elementary school (which he later burned). He has paranormal, spiritual abilities, and is generally described as an exorcist. He is also a moonshine producer and a poacher.

The character has been described as

a horrendous old boozer, a village exorcist, bootlegger and poacher, who scares others off with his looks, smell, and manners – or rather lack thereof. ... Due to some supernatural abilities, he also exterminates ghosts, vampires, zombies, and any other kinds of "paranormal vermin". In his spare time, he lifts spells, undoes curses, sometimes even saving humanity.

== Character analysis ==
The name "Jakub Wędrowycz" is a wordplay based on a literal translation of Johnnie Walker into Polish. He is seen in Poland as a combination of popular negative stereotypes and vices of Poles, which nonetheless evokes sympathy. He is an anti-hero. He is also a rebel, mistrustful and often openly defying government and authority figures.

== Reception and significance ==
Wędrowycz has been described as the most original and easily recognizable characters of Pilipiuk's speculative fiction and humorous prose, as well as one of the icons of modern Polish pop culture. Outside Poland, books featuring Wędrowycz have also been translated into Czech, and have been described as very popular in the Czech Republic. Some Wędrowycz books have also been translated into Russian.

Polish writer Jacek Dukaj has written that Wędrowycz is "one of the most colorful, original and memorable characters in Polish science fiction and fantasy", comparable to Andrzej Sapkowski's Geralt of Rivia, the main character of The Witcher series.

Wędrowycz has spawned a collectible card game and a fandom convention, Dni Jakuba Wędrowycza (Days of Jakub Wędrowycz). The card game was released in 2011. The convention has been held in Wojsławice, a village featured in many stories related to Wędrowycz, since 2006. In 2013, during the eighth annual convention, a 3 m (9.8 ft) tall wooden monument of Jakub Wędrowycz was unveiled. In 2019, plans for raising a similar statue of another character from the series, Jakub's friend Semen Korczaszko, were announced. In 2016, a regional branch of PTTK, a Polish tourist organization, created a badge for those who visit local tourist attractions related to the Wędrowycz stories.

== Appearances in media ==
Wędrowycz first appeared in Pilipiuk's debut work, a short story called Hiena (Hyena) in the February 1996 issue of Fenix magazine. His first book appearance was in the 2001 short story collection Kroniki Jakuba Wędrowycza (The Chronicles of Jakub Wędrowycz), the first in a series of several short story collections on the character.

As of 2025 there are eleven collections of short stories on Wędrowycz published by Pilipiuk:

- Kroniki Jakuba Wędrowycza (The Chronicles of Jakub Wędrowycz, 2001)
- Czarownik Iwanow (Ivanov the Wizard, 2002)
- Weźmisz Czarno kure (Ye Shall Take a Black Hen, 2002)
- Zagadka Kuby Rozpruwacza (Mystery of Jack the Ripper, 2004)
- Wieszać każdy może (Anyone Can Be a Hangman, 2006)
- Homo bimbrownikus (Homo moonshinicus, 2009)
- Trucizna (Poison, 2012)
- Konan Destylator (Conan The Distiller, 2016)
- Karpie Bijem (Carps I Beat, 2019)
- Faceci w Gumofilcach (Men in Wellies, 2022)
- Wojsławicka Masakra Kosą Mechaniczną (Wojsławickan Chainscythe Massacre, 2025)

Wędrowycz also makes minor or cameo appearances in a few other stories and books by Pilipiuk. And he also appeared, with Pilipiuk's permission, in the book Czas Herkulesów (2017) by Polish writer Marcin Wroński.

In 2011, the comic book Dobić dziada (Finish Off the Geezer), featuring Wędrowycz, was published. A sequel, Zabójca (Killer), was published in 2014.
