= Central Investigation Bureau of Police =

Central Investigation Bureau of Police Centralne Biuro Śledcze Policji
- Abbreviation: CBŚP (formerly CBŚ)

Agency overview
- Formed: 15 April 2000

Jurisdictional structure
- Operations jurisdiction: Poland

Operational structure
- Headquarters: ul. Podchorążych 38, Warsaw
- Agency executive: Kamil Borkowski

The Central Investigation Bureau of Police (Polish: Centralne Biuro Śledcze Policji, CBŚP) is a unit within the Police of Poland tasked with dealing with organized crime.

The Central Investigation Bureau of Police was created on 15 April 2000. It has been called "the Polish FBI".

Until 2014 it was a unit of the General Police Headquarters of Poland. In 2014, it has been reorganized as a more independent unit. Its director is appointed by the Ministry of Interior and Administration.
