= Stary Majdan, Gmina Wojsławice =

Stary Majdan
- Village
- Location within Poland
- Coordinates: 50°54′2″N 23°29′50″E
- Country: Poland
- Voivodeship: Lublin
- County: Chełm
- Gmina: Wojsławice

Stary Majdan (Polish pronunciation: [ˈstarɨ ˈmajdan]) is a village in the administrative district of Gmina Wojsławice, within Chełm County, Lublin Voivodeship, in eastern Poland.
