= Histmag =

Histmag is a Polish web portal dedicated to history. It was founded in 2001.

Histmag has published over 5,000 articles, most of which are available online for free. Notable writers included professors Maciej Bernhardt and Artur Kijas. In March 2009 Histmag reported over 100,000 different readers. In 2008 Histmag was visited by 675,000 different people who accessed over 2,500,000 different pages on the portal.

The portal is also engaged in various activities aiming to popularize history. In 2009 it sponsored the publication of a book..

Modelling themselves on the efforts of the Canadian writer Yann Martel to fight against the growing indifference of politicians towards literature by sending books to Stephen Harper, in 2011, they began the „Polećmy książki premierowi” (Let's Recommend books for the Prime Minister) in which readers could choose books which would be given to Donald Tusk by Michał Świgon, the erstwhile editor, during a book fair in Warsaw in May of that year. The books given were:

- Bible
- Politics by Aristotle
- Macbeth
- Good Soldier Schweik
- Demons by Dostoevsky
- The Emperor by Ryszard Kapuściński
- The Art of War by Sun Tzu
- Incydent Adolfa H. (The Incident of Adolf H., Polish translation of the French La Part de l'autre, translated into English as The Alternate Hypothesis) by Éric-Emmanuel Schmitt
- Protokół dyplomatyczny i ceremoniał państwowy II RP (National diplomatic and ceremonial protocol of the Second Republic) by Janusz Sibor
- Making Money, part of the Discworld series by Terry Pratchett

The books were donated by the publishers for free.

Receiving them, Tusk promised to give the copies of those he already had to a library, but that he would read the others with pleasure. He joked that according to some, The Art of War was about female-male relations. When asked to recommend a book himself, he replied that while he felt like he ought to recommend a book by a Polish author, he in fact had to choose The Kite Runner by Khaled Hosseini, which he called "incomparable".
