= Andrzej Pilipiuk =

Polish writer (born 1974)

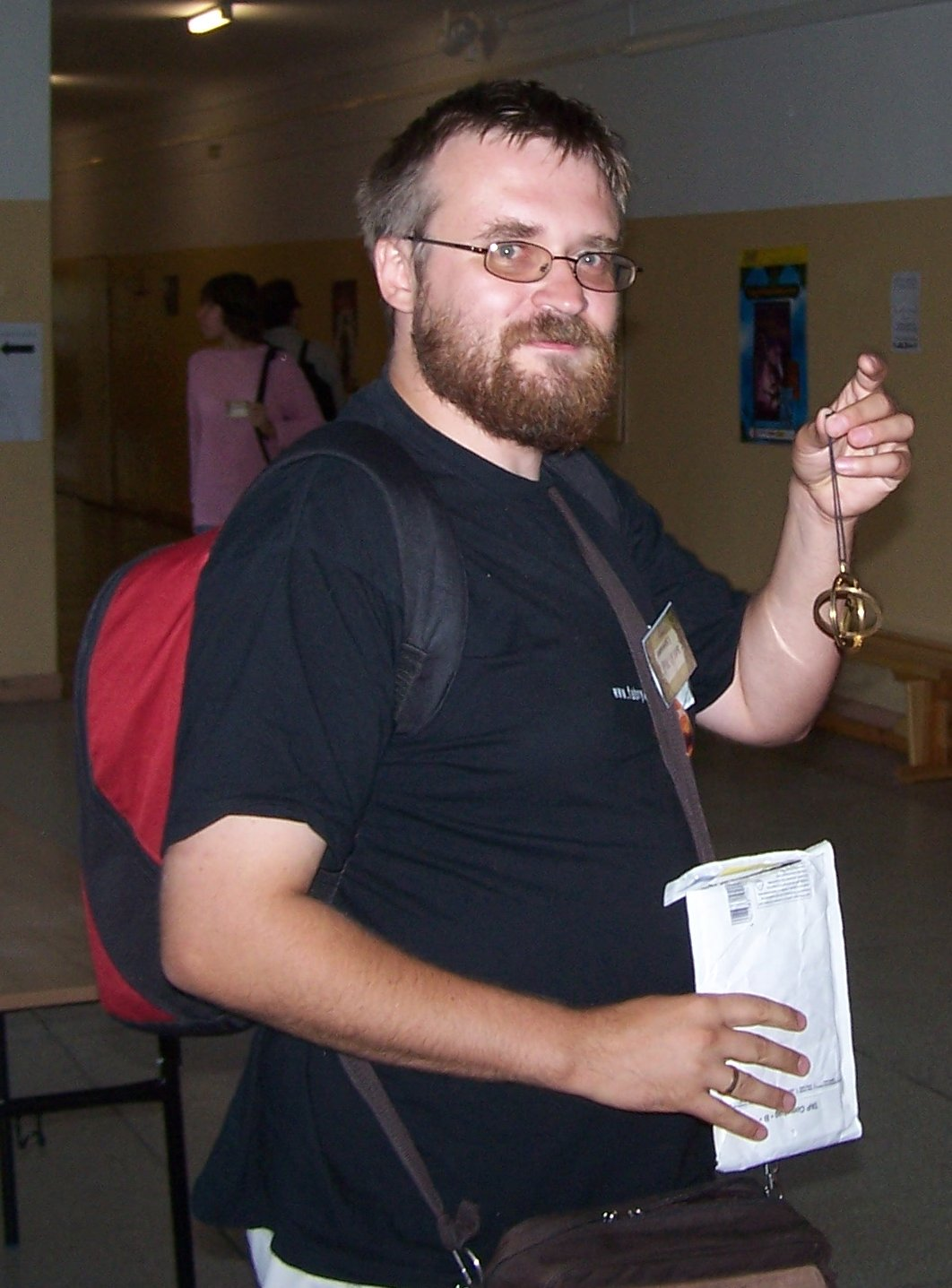
- Andrzej Pilipiuk at Polcon in 2006
- Born: 20 March 1974 (age 52) Warsaw, Poland
- Genre: Fantasy

Andrzej Pilipiuk (born 20 March 1974 in Warsaw), Polish humoristic science-fiction and fantasy author. He debuted in 1996 with short story "Hiena", which featured the first appearance of Jakub Wędrowycz, an alcoholic exorcist. Since that time, Pilipiuk has written over a hundred of other short stories about that character.

Nine times nominated to the Janusz A. Zajdel Award, won it in 2002 for his short story Kuzynki, which he expanded into a novel in 2003 and followed by sequels: Księżniczka in 2004 and Dziedziczki in 2005. The series describes the adventures of 3 women: a more-than-1000-year-old teenage vampire, a 300-year-old alchemist-szlachcianka, and her relative, a former Polish secret agent from CBŚ (Polish 'FBI'). A recurring character in the series alchemist Michał Sędziwój, and the universe is the same as the one of Wędrowycz (who makes appearances from time to time).

Plipiuk lives in Kraków.

== Bibliography ==
=== Series of Jakub Wędrowycz ===
- Chronicles of Jakub Wędrowycz, (Kroniki Jakuba Wędrowycza, 2001)
- Ivanov the Wizard, (Czarownik Iwanow, 2002)
- Ye Shall Take a Black Hen, (Weźmisz czarno kure..., 2002)
- Mystery of Jack the Reaper, (Zagadka Kuby Rozpruwacza, 2004)
- Hanging for everybody, (Wieszać każdy może, 2006)
- Homo moonshinicus, (Homo bimbrownikus, 2009)
- Poison, (Trucizna, November 2012)
- Conan the Distiller, (Konan destylator, 2016)

=== Series Womenfolk (Kuzynki) ===
- Tome 1: Womenfolk (Kuzynki, 2003)
- Tome 2: Princess (Księżniczka, 2004)
- Tome 3: Heiress (Dziedziczki, 2005)

=== Series of Pan Samochodzik ===
In 1999-2005 Andrzej Pilipiuk under a pseudonym "Tomasz Olszakowski" also released 19 tomes continuing adventures about Pan Samochodzik:

- Pan Samochodzik i... Arka Noego
- Pan Samochodzik i... rubinowa tiara
- Pan Samochodzik i... tajemnice warszawskich fortów
- Pan Samochodzik i... zaginiony pociąg
- Pan Samochodzik i... sekret alchemika Sędziwoja
- Pan Samochodzik i... zaginione poselstwo
- Pan Samochodzik i... łup Roman Ungern von Sternberg|barona Ungerna
- Pan Samochodzik i... zagubione miasto
- Pan Samochodzik i... wynalazek Franciszek Rychnowski|inżyniera Rychnowskiego
- Pan Samochodzik i... potomek szwedzkiego admirała
- Pan Samochodzik i... ikona z Warszawy
- Pan Samochodzik i... Czarny Książę
- Pan Samochodzik i... więzień Jasnej Góry
- Pan Samochodzik i... brązowy notes
- Pan Samochodzik i... Adam z Wągrowca
- Pan Samochodzik i... diable wiano
- Pan Samochodzik i... mumia egipska
- Pan Samochodzik i... Relikwiarz świętego Olafa
- Pan Samochodzik i... Zamek w Chęcinach

=== Series The Norwegian diary (Norweski dziennik) ===
- Tome 1: Escape (Ucieczka, 2005)
- Tome 2: Foreign paths (Obce ścieżki, 2006)
- Tome 3: Northern Winds (Północne wiatry, 2007)

=== Series Deer`s eye (Oko Jelenia) ===
- The Way to Nidaros (Droga do Nidaros, 2008)
- Silver Doe From Visby (Srebrna Łania z Visby, 2008)
- The Wooden Stronghold (Drewniana Twierdza, 2008)
- The Master of Wolves (Pan Wilków, 2009)
- Triumph of Fox Reinicke (Tryumf Lisa Reinicke, 2010)
- Armillary Sphere (Sfera armilarna, 2011)
- The Owl's Mirror (Sowie Zwierciadło)

=== Other ===
- Azure Leprosy (Błękitny trąd, 2001)
- The greatest mystery of mankind (Największa tajemnica ludzkości, never released)
- 2586 Steps (2586 kroków, 2005) Short stories
- Operation: Resurrection Day (Operacja Dzień Wskrzeszenia, 2006)
- Red Fever (Czerwona gorączka, 2007) Short stories
- The Tree Butcher (Rzeźnik drzew, 2009) Short stories
- The Vampire from M-3 (Wampir z M-3, 2011)
- Aparatus (2011)

=== In preparation ===
- Liberty Bell (Dzwon wolności, 2010) Short stories
- Deer's eye t. 7 Incinerated city (Miasto spopielone, 2011) has been canceled due to the story's closure in a previous book Armillary sphere
