= Third Battle of Petrozsény =

- Part of the Battle of Transylvania of the Romanian Campaign of World War I
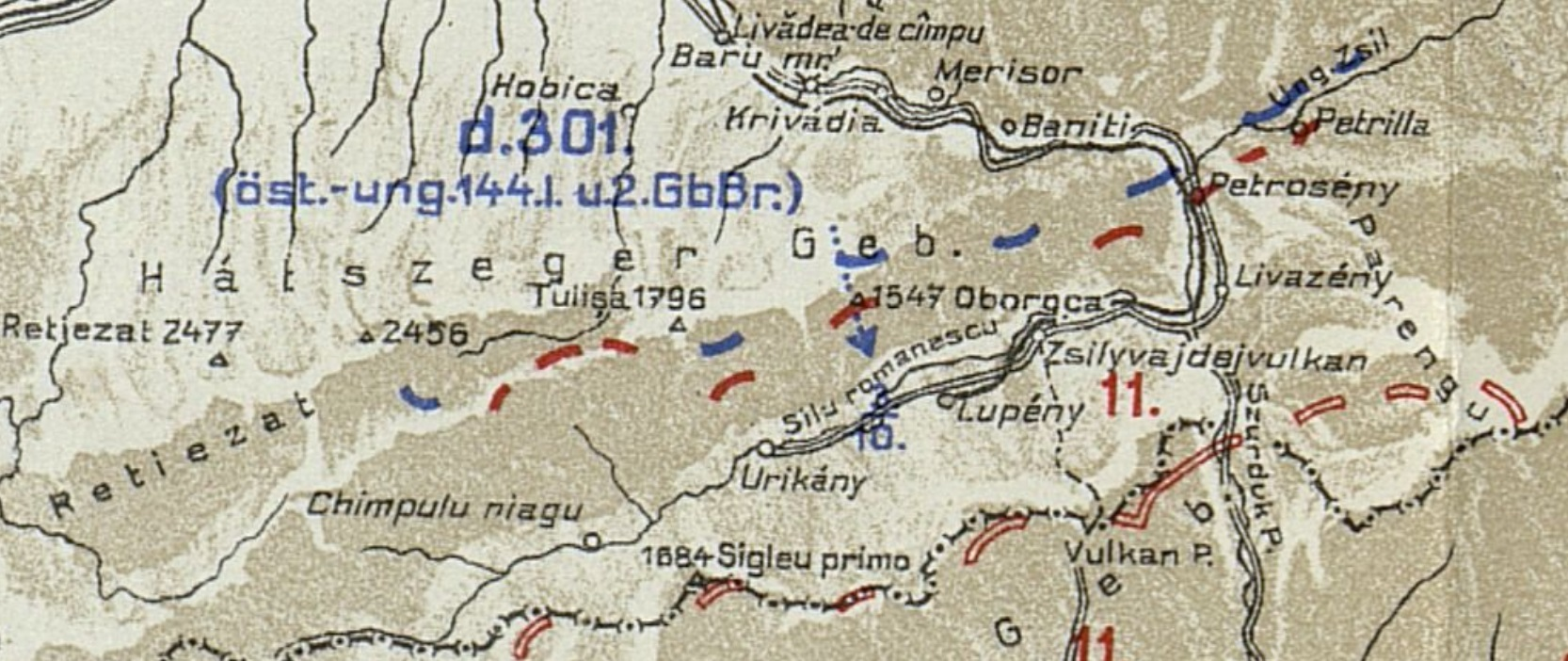
- Course of the battle from 1 to 5 October
Date	30 September – 5 October 1916
Location	Petrozsény and the surrounding area, Transylvania, Austria-Hungary (today Petroșani, Romania)
Result	Central Powers victory

Belligerents
Romania	Austria-Hungary; German Empire

Commanders and leaders
(Kingdom of Romania) Ioan Culcer (Kingdom of Romania) Dumitru Cocorăscu	(German Empire) Erich von Falkenhayn (German Empire) Johannes von Busse

Units involved
1st Army: 11th Division	9th Army: 301st Division; 144th Austro-Hungarian Infantry Brigade; 2nd Austro-Hungarian Mountain Brigade; 2 German battalions; 2 German batteries

Casualties and losses
Unknown	Unknown

The Third Battle of Petrozsény was a World War I military engagement between Romanian forces on one side and Central Powers forces (Austria-Hungary and Germany) on the other side. It was part of the wider Battle of Transylvania and the last engagement in the area around Petrozsény. The battle resulted in a Central Powers victory.

== Background ==
Romania declared war on the Central Powers on 27 August 1916, and proceeded to invade the region of Transylvania. On 29 August, the Romanian I Corps of the 1st Army (General Ioan Culcer) defeated the Hungarian coal miner battalions defending the vital Transylvanian coal mining center at Petrozsény (Petroșani), inflicting heavy losses, and occupied the town. Given that this was a region of valuable coal mines which were vital for the Hungarian railways, this was the area where the first Central Powers counterattack against the Romanian invasion of Transylvania was launched. Taking place on 8 September, it was also the first military engagement during the Battle of Transylvania to involve German forces, three days after the first German unit to arrive in Transylvania unloaded at Marosillye (Ilia) on 5 September. Despite German support, the Austro-Hungarian commander of the 144th Infantry Brigade, Colonel Ludwig Berger, "inexplicably" ordered a retreat. Thus, the Romanians had little difficulty repulsing the first Central Powers counterattack against their invasion of Transylvania.

German General Hermann von Staabs, the commander of the XXXIX Corps which had assumed responsibility on 8 September for operations in the southern region of Transylvania, reacted quickly to the Austrian withdrawal. Aside from the Austro-Hungarian 144th Infantry Brigade and the German 187th Regiment of the German 187th Infantry Division (the first German unit to enter Transylvania), von Staabs also sent to Puj the 189th Regiment, the artillery belonging to the 187th Division, as well as the Bavarian light infantry regiment of the Alpenkorps (the first unit of the Alpenkorps to arrive in Transylvania). This force, commanded by Major General Edwin Sunkel (the commander of the German 187th Infantry Division), began its advance on 14 September. Meantime the Romanian forces in the area were severely reduced. At the beginning of September, the Romanian units in the area comprised the bulk of General Culcer's 1st Army: the 2nd, 11th and 12th Divisions. However, following the Romanian defeat in the Dobruja, the 2nd and 12th divisions were transferred to the south. The transfer of Culcer's two divisions started before 9 September. On the 9th, Major Radu R. Rosetti from the Romanian headquarters stated to General Andrei Zayonchkovski - the Russian commander in Dobruja - that the 2nd and 12th Divisions "were coming from Transylvania". The remaining 11th Division in the Petrozsény sector was commanded by General Ioan Muică. Culcer also involved himself more directly in local operations by sending the command of the I Corps - the group of Romanian 1st Army divisions operating in Transylvania - to Nagytalmács (Tălmaciu/Talmesch), to direct the operations of the two divisions located there. Initially, the I Corps directed operations in both the area around Petrozsény (Jiu Valley) and the area around Nagytalmács (Olt Valley). General Ioan Popovici, commander of the I Corps, arrived in Nagytalmács along with his staff on 16 September.

The three divisions of the German 9th Army concentrating at Szászsebes (Sebeș/Mühlbach) could be enveloped by the Romanians from the region of the two mountain passes, and - according to German planning - this was the possibility to be dealt with first. The German-led Central Powers force disposed of an exceedingly strong concentration of howitzers and mountain guns, amounting to an overwhelming superiority in artillery. The task of throwing back the Romanian forces in the area over the frontier was accomplished between 14 and 22 September (Battle of Nagybár and First Battle of Petrozsény). On 21 September, a Berlin dispatch announced that the Vulcan Pass was taken by German forces. However, on the following day, the Romanians were still fighting at this point. On 22 September, the two German battalions remaining in the area stormed the Vulcan Pass. The remainder of the German forces were shifted to another sector of the Transylvanian front. This shifting of forces began during the night of 22–23 September, as the Germans appeared to have imagined that they had finished off their opponents. The Central Powers force left behind to mask the Vulcan and Szurdok passes thus remained mostly Austro-Hungarian, consisting of the 144th Brigade reinforced by two German battalions and two batteries. However, sympathetic ethnic-Romanians living in the region immediately made General Culcer's headquarters aware that the bulk of the Germans had pulled out of the area. The Romanian general promptly took advantage of this development, launching his counterattack on 25 September. Culcer personally directed operations. The Central Powers were driven back to Merisor.

German General Erich von Falkenhayn sent the newly-formed 301st Division to take charge at Petrozsény. This division had no units other than a headquarters staff, its function being to provide an additional control element. The 301st Division was commanded by General Johannes von Busse. Von Busse arrived in the Petrozsény Basin on 28 September and managed to assemble the five battalions of the Austro-Hungarian 2nd Mountain Brigade much faster than anyone thought possible. Both the 2nd Mountain Brigade and the 144th Infantry Brigade were placed under the command of the German 301st Division. The Romanian command was likewise altered. On 19 September, Brigadier-General Ioan Muică's 11th Division abandoned the Szurdok Pass, retreating to Bumbești, back across the border. Apparently, this action was not part of the plan of Muică's superior, General Ioan Culcer. This is evidenced by the fact that, during the 11th Division's successful counterattack launched on 25 September, it was Culcer himself who directed operations. The relieved Muică was ultimately replaced by General Dumitru Cocorăscu.

== Battle ==
Much to Falkenhayn's relief, von Busse's forces attacked west of Petrozsény on 30 September. On 1 October, the Romanian forces held a line extending from west of Mount Tulișa to Mount Oboroca - running north of Hobicaurikány (Uricani) and Kimpulunyág (Câmpu lui Neag), Lupény (Lupeni) and Zsilyvajdejvulkán (Vulcan) - then continuing northeast through Petrozsény and Petrilla (Petrila). The Austro-Hungarian 144th Brigade fought at Petrilla at the beginning of October. On 1 October, the Germans reached Petrozsény. The fighting for Petrozsény itself took place between 1 and 3 October. The official Austro-Hungarian communique of 2 October announced the seizure of Mount Oboroca. However, it was only on 3 October that a Romanian communique acknowledged the loss of Mount Oboroca to Austro-Hungarian troops. The Romanian communique appears to be the correct one, given that post-war Austrian sources state that the fighting for Oboroca took place on 3 October. The Austro-Hungarian unit involved was the 2nd Mountain Brigade. The Romanian communique of 4 October announced the Romanian withdrawal from the region, but not before destroying Petrozsény's coal mines. The battle ended on 5 October, with both Petrozsény and the Szurdok Pass being recaptured by the Central Powers.

== Aftermath ==
Before being finally left in the hands of the Austro-Hungarians, Petrozsény was reduced to rubble. The Romanians succeeded in destroying the town's vital coal mines before retreating. On 23 October, the Central Powers launched the First Battle of the Jiu Valley.
