= Battle of Mount Csindrel =

- Part of the Battle of Transylvania of the Romanian Campaign of World War I
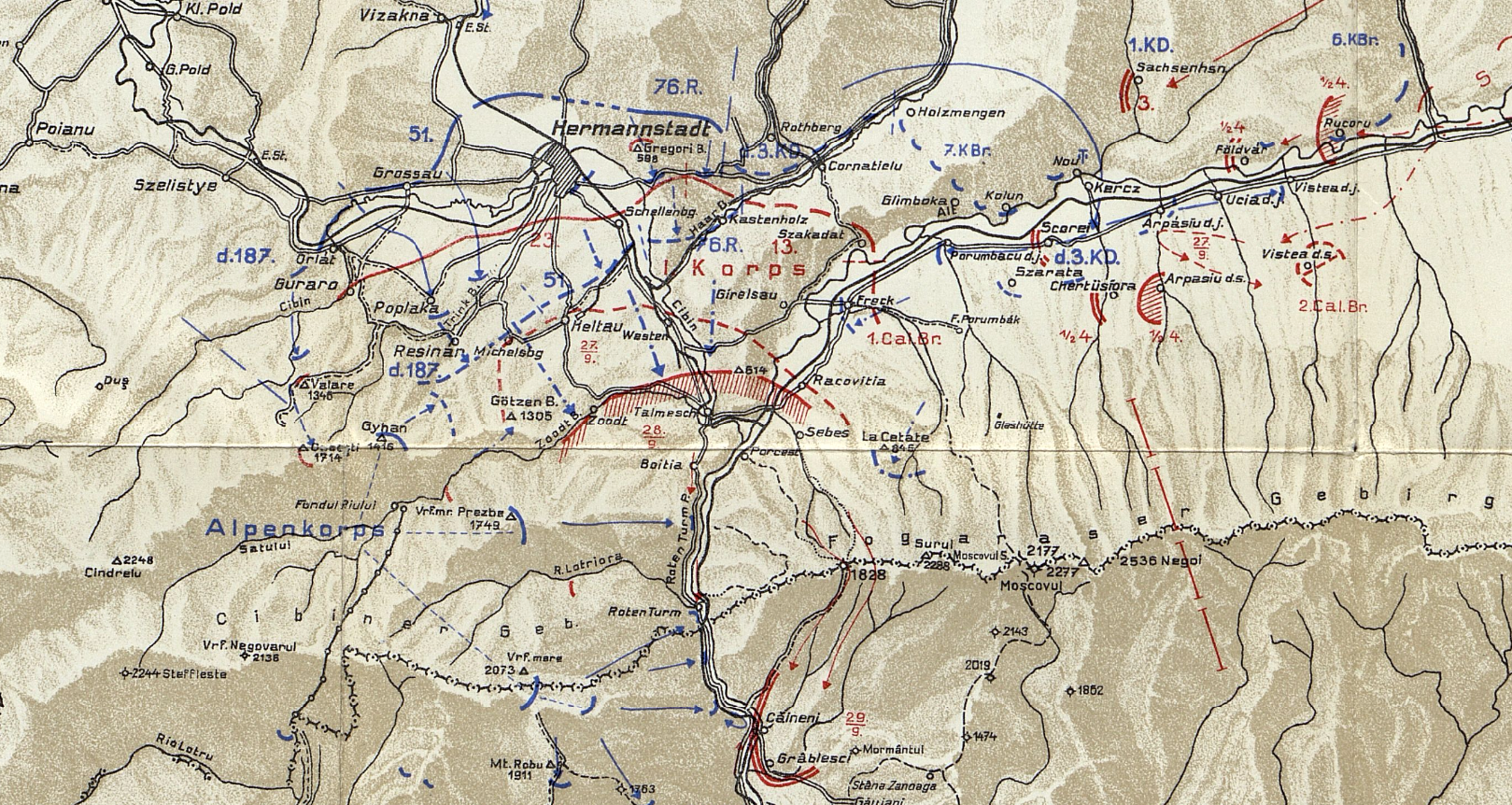
- Dus and Mount Csindrel to its south visible on the western edge of this map
Date	23 September 1916
Location	Dus, north of Mount Csindrel, Transylvania, Austria-Hungary (today Cindrel Mountains, Romania) 45°39′56″N 23°47′57″E
Result	Romanian tactical victory

Belligerents
Romania	German Empire

Commanders and leaders
(Kingdom of Romania) Ioan Culcer	(German Empire) Ludwig Ritter von Tutschek

Strength
1 company	1 brigade

Casualties and losses
100 killed 23 captured	107 killed or wounded Unknown captured

The Battle of Mount Csindrel was a World War I military engagement between German and Romanian forces. It was part of the 1916 Battle of Transylvania and resulted in a tactical victory for the Romanians.

== Background ==
After launching his successful initial offensives at Petrozsény (Petroșani) and Nagyszeben (Sibiu/Hermannstadt), the commander of the Romanian 1st Army – General Ioan Culcer – placed a company of infantry in the wild and mountainous area which separates the Olt and Jiu Valleys. The area was enormous: the two valleys are 45 miles apart. Normally, keeping surveillance over such a large area with only one company of soldiers would be impossible, but the Romanians also disposed of border guards and customs officials scattered throughout the mountains, and most of these posts had telephones for reporting activity. Having assembled at the Zsinna (Jina/Sinna) Monastery near the foot of the Szeben (Cindrel) Mountains, the Alpenkorps departed at 6 a.m. on 23 September 1916.

The Jäger brigade, under General Ludwig Ritter von Tutschek, marched in the lead. It was followed by Colonel Franz Ritter von Epp's Bavarian Guard Regiment, with support troops and pack animals at the rear. Two batteries of Austro-Hungarian mountain artillery accompanied the Germans. In the meantime, the command structure of the Romanian 1st Army had been altered. General Culcer sent General Ioan Popovici – the commander of the I Corps – to direct the operations of the two divisions located in the Olt Valley. Popovici and his staff arrived in Nagytalmács (Tălmaciu/Talmesch) on 16 September. In practice, due to the disobedience of General Popovici, General Culcer had lost the effective control over the area. Popovici not only ignored Culcer's orders to shorten his overextended lines and form a reserve, but outright went against them by launching an attack on 22 September. Thus, by the 22nd, it became evident that Culcer no longer had actual control over operations in the Olt Valley.

== Battle ==
The German force departed from Zsinna (Jina/Sinna) at 6 a.m. on 23 September. Just before arriving at the overnight bivouac, the Jäger brigade (General Ludwig Ritter von Tutschek) drove off some Romanian guards in a sharp fight. The engagement took place near the customs house at Dus (Duș). The Romanian casualties amounted to 100 killed and 23 captured, while the German casualties amounted to 107 killed or wounded, plus an unknown number of prisoners. German infantry reached the summit of Mount Csindrel (Cindrel) at 10:30 p.m., in pitch dark. Although the Romanian position fell to the advanced guards of the Bavarian brigade, the Romanian garrison escaped.

== Aftermath ==
The Alpenkorps reached the Turnu Roșu Pass on the 26th. This engagement amounted to the only instance of Romanian opposition against the days-long march of the Germans through the mountains. Although the Romanian position fell, the battle resulted in a tactical victory for the Romanians. The Romanian force that General Culcer had sent into the mountains was not meant to halt the enemy, its purpose was merely surveillance. And this objective was accomplished: the Germans thought that the Romanians seemed unaware of their presence, but the Romanians had actually spotted the Alpenkorps. Culcer's stationing of a unit above Voineasa proved prescient. The Romanian garrison escaped, taking with it an unknown number of German prisoners.

These prisoners had revealed to Culcer on 24 September that two regiments from a German division located near Nagyszeben (Sibiu/Hermannstadt) had entered the mountains "in order to attack in the Lotru and Sadu valleys". Culcer passed this information on to General Popovici, adding that two other reports confirmed it. One report emanated from west of Mount Csindrel (Cindrel), in the area of what is today Lake Oașa. In response to these reports, Popovici sent two battalions into the mountains: one battalion and some guns for the protection of the Red Tower Pass and another battalion was dispatched to protect the regions west of the pass. German General Erich von Falkenhayn interpreted the shifting of these two battalions as a last-minute attempt by Popovici to withdraw, and in consequence ordered his subordinate to attack late on 25 September. However, dusk was already falling and little could be gained by attacking at such a late hour. The German attack began at dawn on the 26th.
