= Battle of Petrozsény =

The Battle of Petrozsény or Battle of Petroșani may refer to any of the following battles between Austro-Hungarian and German forces against Romanian ones during World War I:

- First Battle of Petrozsény, 17–22 September 1916
- Second Battle of Petrozsény, 25–28 September 1916
- Third Battle of Petrozsény, 30 September–5 October 1916
