= Ioan Culcer =

Wallachian-born Romanian military leader and politician

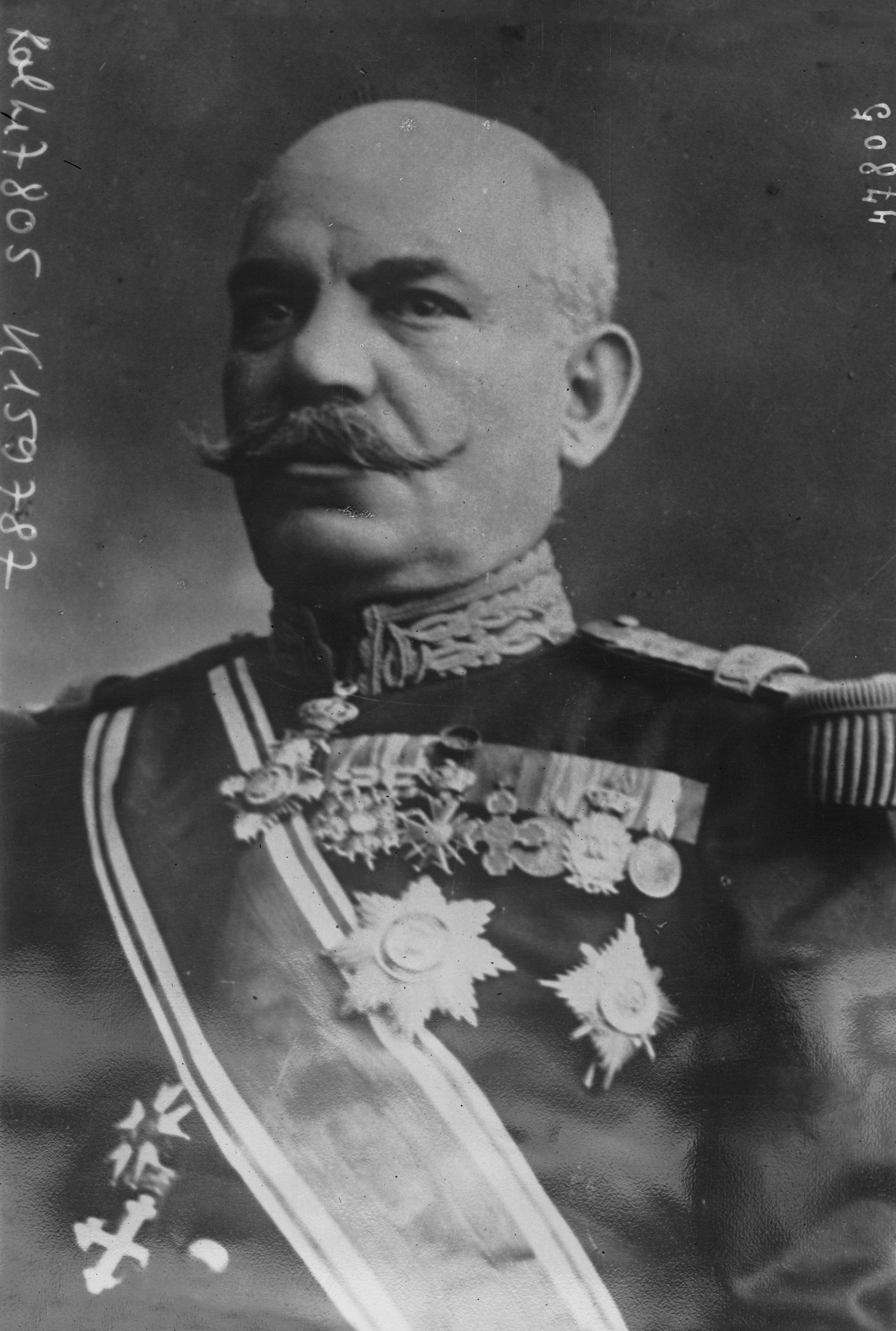
- General Ioan Culcer in 1916
- Born: July 29, 1853; Târgu Jiu, Wallachia
- Died: September 1928 (aged 75); Bucharest, Kingdom of Romania
- Military career
- Allegiance: Romanian Army
- Branch: Military engineering
- Service years: 1877–1916
- Rank: First Lieutenant (1877); General de Divizie (1916)
- Commands: 5th Corps (1913–1916); 1st Army (August – October 1916)
- Conflicts: Romanian War of Independence; Siege of Plevna; Second Balkan War; Southern Dobruja Offensive; World War I; Romanian Campaign; Battle of Transylvania; Nagyszeben Offensive; Petrozsény Offensive; Battle of Mezőlivádia; Battle of Sellenberk; Battle of Nagybár; First Battle of Petrozsény; Veresmart Offensive; Battle of Mount Csindrel; Second Battle of Petrozsény; Battle of Kolun; Battle of Nagyszeben; Third Battle of Petrozsény; Orsova Offensive; Battle of Herkulesfürdő; First Battle of Orsova; Battle of Sălătrucu; First Battle of the Jiu Valley
- Awards: Military Virtue Medal; Order of Saint Stanislaus; Order of the Black Eagle; Order of the Star of Romania
- Other work: Secretary-general of the War Ministry (1904–1907)

Minister of Public Works
- In office 29 January 1918 – 4 March 1918
- Prime Minister: Alexandru Averescu
- Preceded by: Dimitrie Greceanu
- Succeeded by: Constantin Hârjeu

Ioan Culcer (29 July 1853 – September 1928) was a Wallachian-born Romanian military leader and politician. Culcer served as a lieutenant during the Romanian War of Independence (1877–1878) and as a general during the Second Balkan War and World War I. In early 1918, he served as Minister for Public Works in the First Averescu cabinet. He commanded the Romanian 1st Army during the 1916 Battle of Transylvania.

== Early life and career ==
Culcer was born in Târgu Jiu, Wallachia, on 29 July 1853, his family originating from Transylvania. He entered the Military School and graduated with the rank of second lieutenant. He participated in the Romanian War of Independence (1877–1878), in which he was wounded and promoted to lieutenant.

During the Siege of Plevna, 90% of the officers and 50% of the troops from the battalions of the first Romanian assault wave were killed. From the battalion commanded by Captain Valter Mărăcineanu, Culcer was the only officer who survived. At that time, he was a First Lieutenant.

After the war he attended the École Polytechnique in Paris, and subsequently the École d'application militaire in Fontainebleau. He specialized as chief engineer and became teacher at the Military School in Romania.

In 1882, under the direction of Belgian military architect Henri Alexis Brialmont, he supervised the building of a Romanian system of defensive fortifications on the line Galați–Nămoloasa–Iași, and around the capital Bucharest.

During this time, Culcer advanced in rank to captain (1880), major (1887), lieutenant colonel (1891), colonel (1895), and brigadier general (1904). He was secretary general of the Ministry of Defence (1904–1907) and then became Inspector General of the Romanian Army. In this function, he helped mobilize the Romanian Army for the Second Balkan War. In 1911 he was promoted to divisional general.

=== Second Balkan War ===
Romania declared war on Bulgaria on 10 July 1913. That same day, 80,000 soldiers of Culcer's Romanian 5th Corps crossed the border into Southern Dobruja and occupied the line from Tutrakan to Balchik. The cavalry attached to this corps briefly occupied the Black Sea port of Varna, but retreated back into Dobruja when the lack of Bulgarian resistance became apparent. The Treaty of Bucharest, signed on 10 August, assigned to Romania the Tutrakan – Balchik line.

For his efforts, King Carol I appointed Culcer Governor of Southern Dobruja, the province annexed by Romania after the 1913 Treaty of Bucharest.

== World War I ==
Culcer commanded the Romanian 1st Army from August to October, 1916. The Battle of Transylvania comprised the bulk of his service as commander of the 1st Army.

=== Culcer and his forces prior to Romania's entry into World War I ===
At the start of 1916, Culcer was still in command of the 5th Army Corps, before receiving the command of the Romanian 1st Army that August. Before Romania joined the war, he also served as army inspector. Culcer held the official rank of Divisional general (General de Divizie). All of his colleagues – including the future Marshals Alexandru Averescu and Constantin Prezan – held the same rank, despite commanding field armies. Before the start of the First World War, Romania did not have multiple field armies. The 1914 establishment of nearly 100,000 men was organized into five army corps, each corps having two divisions. After the war started, five more divisions were formed (11–15), followed by five more in 1916, before Romania joined the war (16–20). Three more divisions were created in the first ten days of the Romanian Campaign, bringing the total to 23. Thirteen of these divisions had no howitzers at all, the twenty-five batteries of 120 mm howitzers being scattered among ten lucky divisions. The original 10 divisions averaged thirty machine-guns each, while the 13 wartime divisions had only half that many. Artillery batteries ranged from a low of 8 in the newer divisions to an average of 16 in the original ten divisions. In regards to experience, the Romanian Army had last taken the field in 1913, during the Second Balkan War. However, the Romanian advance into Bulgaria was uncontested, comprising little more than an advanced training exercise. Romania's latest proper combat foray consisted in its involvement in the 1877 – 1878 Russo-Turkish War, fighting closer in technology and spirit to Waterloo than to Somme or Verdun.

Culcer thus had as much combat experience as a full-time Romanian commander could have, having served as an officer in both of these wars: as a First Lieutenant in the 1877 – 1878 campaign, and as a General in the 1913 invasion of Bulgaria. Culcer's 1st Army was the weakest of the three Romanian armies invading Transylvania. The 1st Division could not be deployed to Transylvania, being diverted for the protection of the western frontier of Wallachia, near Orșova. At the onset of the Romanian Campaign, his 1st Army consisted of six divisions: the 1st, the 12th and the four divisions of the I Corps (the 2nd, the 11th, the 13th and the 23rd). Of these 6 divisions, only the 1st and the 2nd were first-line units. Of these two first-line divisions, the 1st was unavailable for operations in Transylvania, leaving four second-line divisions and a single first-line division for operations in the region. According to some sources, Culcer's 1st Army consisted of 5 divisions. When the campaign began, this was indeed the case. However, several days into the campaign, the 23rd Division was formed. The 23rd Division was Culcer's creation: he formed it by combining the Olt and Lotru Groups. All in all, his 1st Army had 135,000 men at the start of the campaign. Culcer's army also employed the use of aircraft. The I Corps (part of his 1st Army) – commanded by General Ioan Popovici – possessed 3 reconnaissance aircraft, although by late September only one of these was operational. The 1st Army also possessed a degree of motorization: over 70 automobiles (cars and trucks). The 1st Army's front extended across 120 miles, from Orșova to east of the Red Tower Pass. Half a dozen divisions could obviously not operate continuously on such a front. As such, the advance fell into three main groups, each separated from the next by over 50 miles of mountain range. The westernmost group – a single division – operated against Orșova, in the Banat region. The remaining two groups operated in Transylvania, one through the Vulcan Pass against Hațeg and the other through the Red Tower Pass against Sibiu.

=== Against Arthur Arz von Straußenburg ===
The Romanian offensive into Transylvania was opposed by the 1st Austro-Hungarian Army, under General Arthur Arz von Straußenburg. This army was constituted that August, just before Romania launched its invasion. Its front extended across all of Transylvania. All in all, Arz's 1st Army rallied 34,000 soldiers against the Romanian armies invading Transylvania, which totaled 369,000 soldiers.

The Romanian campaign plan defined the 1st Army's mission as safeguarding the left flank of the Romanian forces liberating Transylvania. The intermediate objective called for Culcer's army to cross the border and head towards the designated assembly area, which for the Jiu Valley Group constituted the Merișor Valley and the Petroșani Basin, and for the Olt Group the area between Sibiu and the northern exit from the Red Tower Pass. The assembly area was scheduled to be reached no later than 13 September. The distance between the two approaches, between 60 and 65 miles, prevented the two invading columns from aiding one another until they converged on the Mureș River, their ultimate objective. On 27 August 1916, at 8:45 p.m., the Romanian ambassador to Austria-Hungary handed Romania's declaration of war to the Austro-Hungarian foreign minister. Culcer's Olt-Lotru Group subsequently entered the Red Tower Pass and advanced towards Sibiu. Romanian bullets fell on the Hungarian gendarmes at the large border gate, taking them completely by surprise. By dawn, the Romanians occupied the villages of Porcești and Sebeș, and later that day, the village of Boița at the head of the pass was taken. On 29 August, Tălmaciu was taken, followed by Cisnădie – a local district capital – on the 30th. Following an entire day of fighting, the Romanians defeated the 51st Honvéd Division and the 143rd Brigade, causing the Austro-Hungarian defenders to retreat to the heights on both sides of Sibiu. Instead of advancing into the city, however, the Romanians began to dig in south of Sibiu on the night of 30 August. General Matei Castriș – commander of the Olt-Lotru Group and later of the 23rd Division – ordered his columns to halt, establishing three lines of trenches running from Veștem to the Red Tower Pass. Although invited to occupy Sibiu by civilian representatives of the population, Castriș was unwilling to take such a step without permission. Although permission was granted for the capture of the town, there were additional delays while the commander of the 23rd Division made detailed plans for a victory march. Sixty-five miles to the west, the 11th Division (Brigadier-General Ioan Muică) crossed the border at the Vulcan and Surduc Passes and occupied the vital Transylvanian coal-mining center at Petroșani – a local district capital – on 29 August. The Romanians easily swept aside the weak resistance offered by the Hungarian coal-miner battalions, inflicting heavy losses. This was the first location of any military or commercial value to fall into Romanian hands, a region of valuable coal mines whose output was vital for the Hungarian railway system. The 11th Division subsequently pushed west into the Merișor Valley, stopping 15 miles from Hațeg. This halt complied with the directions received by Culcer. Although criticized for not advancing north of Hațeg, Culcer never received orders to move forward. He was actually restricted from moving because the Romanian campaign plan stated that general headquarters would direct the operations of the covering forces.

Having succeeded in their mission of crossing the mountains, the covering forces dug in. They waited for the arrival and reassembly of the main units mobilizing in Romania. The Germans and Austro-Hungarians could hardly believe their luck. Some of the Romanian generals – Culcer included – understood that waiting for their forces to regroup would waste the opportunity to advance against an enemy which – at the time – was weak, confused and disorganized. The argument in favor of advancing brought about the first war council of senior leaders at Army General Headquarters on 2 September. On account of their successes thus far, generals Prezan and Culcer urged continuing the offensive without waiting for the reassembly of their mobilizing troops. General Averescu led the opposition and called for sticking to the schedule of Plan Z (the Romanian campaign plan), which had allocated 12 days to cross the mountains and regroup before advancing into central Transylvania. He argued that changing a complex plan in the middle of its execution would lead to confusion. Those in favor of continuing the offensive carried the day.

Following the war council on 2 September, Culcer instructed Castriș to conduct reconnaissance to the north and across the Mureș. On 2 September, Romanian guns bombarded Sibiu, and that same day, Romanian patrols entered the city. Following the occupation of Sibiu on 2 September, the Romanians evacuated the city on the following day. When Transylvania came under the protection of the Habsburgs in the late 17th century, Sibiu became its capital. For most of the 18th century and a short period of the 19th, Sibiu was the residence of the governors of Transylvania. Initially, the 1st Army's I Corps had responsibility for both the Jiu and Olt valleys. Given the distances involved, this was problematic. Several days into the campaign, Culcer decided to make the Olt Group a de facto corps headquarters, with General Constantin Manolescu in command. On 7 September, the Romanians engaged the 51st Honvéd Division at Șelimbăr. Further west, by 3 September, the 1st Army occupied the important coal area between Uricani and Petroșani, driving back the ineffective Landsturm and miners battalions of the 144th Infantry Brigade over the saddle of Merișor. The Romanians moved slowly, inching northwest along the Merișor Valley. Culcer justified the lack of action by citing the need of having to protect his forces from a possible flank attack from Caransebeș, to his west. A regiment of the 187th German Division had already started to disembark there, but it scarcely posed a threat to the nearby Romanians, three divisions strong.

=== Against Hermann von Staabs ===
On 8 September, the XXXIX Reserve Corps of German General Hermann von Staabs assumed responsibility for operations in southern Transylvania. The following units were placed under his command: the 51st Honvéd Division, the 187th Infantry Division, the 1st and 3rd Cavalry Divisions and the covering troops at Sibiu and Hațeg. At the same time, Culcer's forces were drastically reduced. Not counting the 1st Division (engaged at Orșova in the Banat), his forces in Transylvania amounted to five divisions: the 2nd, 11th and 12th near Petroșani and the 13th and 23rd at Sibiu. Following the Romanian defeat at Turtucaia, two of his divisions – the 2nd and the 12th – were transferred to the south. It is not known when exactly this transfer started, but it was underway by 9 September. On 9 September, the 2nd and the 12th divisions "were coming from Transylvania". Besides severely reducing the overall strength of the 1st Army, this transfer crippled what used to be the bulk of Culcer's forces. Thus, his forces at Petroșani – the 2nd, 11th and 12th Divisions – were reduced to only the 11th Division. The transfer of the 2nd Division meant that Culcer was left with no first-line divisions in Transylvania, only with three second-line divisions (the 11th at Petroșani together with the 13th and the 23rd at Sibiu). Although all of Culcer's forces remaining in Transylvania were second-line divisions, they still possessed some heavy artillery. By late September, the I Corps had two batteries of 120 mm howitzers. On 8 September, following the German-Bulgarian victory at Turtucaia in the Dobruja, the Romanian High Command ordered a halt to the Transylvania offensive.

On 11 September, at the daily briefing, Culcer was proposed for the command of an army group consisting of Averescu's 3rd Army and Andrei Zayonchkovski's Dobruja Army. King Ferdinand agreed with the concept of unifying the southern armies under one headquarters, but he was reluctant to appoint Culcer. He seemingly feared offending Averescu. The king's hesitation led to another war council being convened, in the morning of 15 September. During this council, Averescu called for reinforcing the Dobruja with units from the 1st and 2nd Armies. As the 1st Army commander, Culcer violently disagreed, adding that the situation on his army's front was critical. By mid-September, his 1st Army had gained the 16th and 18th Divisions. However, after the war council on 15 September, these too were transferred to the south.

On 5 September, the 187th Regiment of the 187th Division – the first German unit in Transylvania – arrived at Ilia. The arrival of the Germans changed things, making it possible for the Central Powers to launch their first counterattack against the Romanian invasion of Transylvania on the 8th, just when the XXXIX Corps assumed responsibility for operations in southern Transylvania. Although the German regiment moved to Livadia on the 8th to reinforce the 144th Infantry Brigade, the Austro-Hungarian commander had inexplicably ordered a retreat. Thus, the Romanians had little trouble repulsing this first Central Powers counterattack. Both Germans and Austro-Hungarians returned in good order to Pui. The Romanians, following up on their success, gained further ground, along with 305 prisoners, 2 guns and some machine guns. By 12 September, they had reached Baru, with Romanian outposts advancing even as far as Pui. By 12 September, three-fourths of the distance between the Romanian border and the vital junction of Hațeg had been covered by the Romanians. Von Staabs reacted swiftly to the Austro-Hungarian withdrawal, sending to Pui the 189th Regiment along with the 187th Division's artillery, plus a regiment of Bavarian light infantry. The Germans and Austro-Hungarians began to advance on the 14th. The battle lasted two days, ending on 15 September. On 15 September, the Romanians withdrew from Baru. Nevertheless, this battle was a Romanian victory: the Romanian retirement from Baru was carried out with considerable skill and in perfect order, the attempt of the Central Powers to outflank the Romanians in the Hațeg Mountains and reach the passes in their rear by a shortcut failed as the Romanians kept their front intact and held on strongly to the main range of the mountains, and the Austro-Hungarian component of this force was defeated. On 17 September, heavy fighting was underway at Merișor. The Germans continued attacking and entered Petroșani on the 18th. Further east, on 10 September, the 1st Army fought off the 51st Honvéd Division and entered Șelimbăr. In this sector, following the capture of Șelimbăr, the Romanian advance came to a complete stop for a fortnight. Șelimbăr became the center of the Romanian positions north of the Red Tower Pass. These extended from Porumbacu in the east to the Săcel – Orlat – Poplaca line in the west. Șelimbăr is where Michael the Brave had defeated the Hungarians in 1599. Culcer ordered the deployment of an infantry company to the region north of Voineasa, in the wild and mountainous area which separates the Olt and Jiu Valleys. The area was enormous: the two valleys are 45 miles apart. Normally, keeping surveillance over such a large area with only one company of soldiers would be impossible, but the Romanians also disposed of border guards and customs officials scattered throughout the mountains, and most of these posts – housed in hunting lodges and cabins – had telephones for reporting activity. Culcer also sent the headquarters of General Popovici's I Corps to Tălmaciu to direct the operations of the two divisions located there. Popovici along with his staff arrived in Tălmaciu on 16 September. After a tour of the front with Popovici, General Manolescu announced that his nerves had failed him. He left for Romania.

=== Against Erich von Falkenhayn ===
The 9th Army was formed on 19 September. The German 9th Army was designed to carry out the offensive against the Romanian 1st Army. On 19 September, Erich von Falkenhayn assumed command of the German 9th Army. This army subsequently started assembling the bulk of its forces near Sibiu. Von Falkenhayn's army comprised the XXXIX Reserve Corps, the Alpine Corps and Cavalry Corps Schmettow. His plan was bold: the annihilation of the Romanian units around Sibiu. Konrad Krafft von Dellmensingen's Alpine Corps Division was to act as an anvil, seizing the Red Tower Pass in order to block a Romanian retreat. Hermann von Staabs's Corps, assembling northwest of Sibiu, was to act as a hammer, driving southeast towards the mouth of the Red Tower Pass at Tălmaciu. With the Alpine Corps blocking the Romanian line of retreat, the XXXIX Corps would smash the Romanians against the mountains. Von Schmettow's cavalry had to maintain contact with the Austro-Hungarian 1st Army, make sure that none of the Romanians escaped east, and block any reinforcements coming from the Romanian 2nd Army, threatening the 9th Army's flank.

In the middle of September, General Culcer moved the I Corps headquarters to Tălmaciu. General Popovici arrived in Tălmaciu along with his staff on 16 September. Popovici had two divisions under his command at Sibiu: the 13th and the 23rd. While concentrating their forces northwest of Sibiu in preparation for the impending battle for that city, the Germans kept the Romanians under artillery fire in order to keep them from sending out patrols that could have discovered the German build-up. Romanian frustration with having to endure this bombardment boiled over, and on 22 September General Popovici ordered his 13th Division to take the heights at Roșia, east of Sibiu. Although this action was against Culcer's orders, it was still Culcer himself who decided to appoint Popovici as commander of the two Romanian divisions headquartered at Tălmaciu. The Romanian 13th Division attacked at dawn on 22 September, in order to gain surprise and avoid an artillery battle, for which it had insufficient ammunition. However, without an artillery preparation, the Central Powers positions remained unscathed, and their machine-gunners cut down the Romanians. In some areas, the fighting was intense, often hand-to-hand. The Romanian attack had driven a wedge between von Schmettow's two cavalry divisions, which — if exploited — could expose the flank of the 9th Army and ruin the plans to take Sibiu. The Romanian pressure was driving apart the 1st Austro-Hungarian and 9th German Armies. General Erich von Falkenhayn (9th Army) asked General Arthur Arz von Straussenburg (1st Army) to give him the arriving German 89th Division to fill the gap. Arz refused, stating that the 89th Division was his only reserve, and giving it away would fatally weaken his army. Arz's Chief of Staff, Colonel Josef Huber, doubted that the 1st Army could hold without the 89th Division. This admission unsettled von Falkenhayn, who contacted the German High Command and asked Erich Ludendorff for help. The latter sided with von Falkenhayn, giving him command of the division on 27 September. Falkenhayn also "grudgingly conceded" that Arz's 1st Army could withdraw its center if absolutely necessary, but not its right wing, which had to remain in contact with von Schmettow's cavalry in order to cover the rear of the 9th Army. Popovici's only real success was attained south of Cornățel, where the Romanians faced the extremely thinly-held positions of the 7th Cavalry Brigade of the 1st Division.

The Alpine Corps departed from Jina at 6 a.m. on 23 September. Just before arriving at the overnight bivouac, the Jäger brigade (General Ludwig Ritter von Tutschek) drove off some Romanian guards in a sharp fight. The engagement took place near the customs house at Dus (Duș). The Romanian casualties amounted to 100 killed and 23 captured, while the German casualties amounted to 107 killed or wounded. German infantry reached the summit of Mount Cindrel at 10:30 p.m., in pitch dark. On the next day, the Germans continued advancing, halting at the Negovanul Hunting Lodge after 14 hours of marching. On the 25th, von Tutschek's infantry continued east, splitting into two columns: one stopped at a forest lodge at Prezba and the other halted in meadows on either side of Varful Mare. The first column was dismayed upon arriving at Prezba as it was evident that a Romanian patrol had just left the lodge, certainly fleeing because of the arriving Germans. By late afternoon, the Germans were in position. They established radio contact in order to verify that the attack would begin on the next day, the 26th. The Germans thought that the Romanians seemed unaware of their presence, but the Romanians had actually spotted the Alpine Corps. Culcer's stationing of a unit above Voineasa proved prescient, placing it in the way of the Alpine Corps as it started its end run through the mountains. Prisoners had revealed to Culcer on the 24th that two German regiments had entered the mountains "in order to attack in the Lotru and Sadu Valleys". Culcer passed this information on to Popovici, adding that two other reports confirmed it. One report emanated from what is today Lake Oașa, on the Sebeș river, west of Mount Cindrel. Popovici's two divisions occupied a line of 25 miles, a large distance even by the standards of the Eastern Front. This extended line with its lack of reserves drew Culcer's unfavorable attention, who tried vainly to get Popovici to shorten his lines and form a reserve. In response to the reports of German units in the mountains to his west, Popovici had sent a battalion of infantry into each of the two valleys (Sadu and Lotru). The left of the Central Powers forces – the German column which was to encircle the Romanians from the east – succeeded in forcing the crossing of the Olt River at Colun, east of Porumbacu. Thus, an effective barrier was created between the 1st and the 2nd Romanian armies. In its advance across the mountain ridge separating the valleys of the Hârtibaciu and Olt Rivers, this German column was faced with determined resistance. Still, its numerical superiority enabled it to prevail. By the evening of 25 September, Kolun was in German hands. On 25 September, General Culcer began moving north by rail from the western Danube half of the 20th Division. The 20th Division reached the southern end of the Red Tower Pass on the 27th.

The attack of the German 9th army began at dawn on the 26th. That same morning, the Alpine Corps occupied the Red Tower Pass at several points, including areas on the southern (Romanian) side of the border. The Romanians, by then aware of their critical position, had commenced a general retreat to the southeast. Strong rearguards were covering this movement. The 187th Division ran almost immediately into strongly held positions. The villages of Săcel, Orlat, Poplaca and Gura Râului had to be captured one by one, swaying battles being fought in their streets. Gura Râului and Poplaca in particular were noted by Falkenhayn for their resistance. Although the villages were captured during the evening, the Romanians remained in their strong positions on the Cioara, Valare and Obreju heights. The 51st Honvéd Division did not advance as it was expecting the 187th Division to prepare the way. The 76th Reserve Division did not actually make it into the battle, being held up by the rough terrain east of Sibiu. During the 27th, German and Hungarian regiments slowly made their way through Daia, Bungard and Cașolț, also capturing the 601 meters-tall Grigori height (the northernmost Romanian position, northeast of Sibiu). Not every detachment received the order to retreat while this was still possible, and the Romanians suffered considerable losses during their withdrawal from the encircled positions. On the 27th, fighting also took place at Cisnădie, a local district capital. The Romanian retreat began in the evening of the 28th and ended in the afternoon of the 29th. Relief from his command and disgrace awaited Popovici. Nevertheless, his retreat did manage to save the soldiers under his command. The Central Powers captured from the Romanian 1st Army 13 guns, 6 machine-guns, 2 aircraft (out of 3) and 3,000 prisoners. Other losses included 10 locomotives with 700 loaded railway wagons (300 of small arms ammunition, 200 of artillery munitions and 200 filled with baggage), 70 cars and trucks, a hospital train and a paymaster's supplies. In spite of the heroic efforts of the Alpine Corps in the Red Tower Pass, the bulk of the Romanian force had escaped. The infantry discovered that they could stay outside the effective range of German machine-guns by pressing along the east side of the pass. The wagon column was restricted to the road, thus taking the brunt of the losses. Out of 16 Romanian artillery batteries, 13 guns were captured. Thus, "by some miracle", almost the entire artillery of the Romanian corps was saved. The loss of the 6 machine-guns captured by the Central Powers was more than made up for by Culcer's almost simultaneous offensive further west, during which the Romanians captured 7 machine-guns. The Romanians escaped complete destruction by abandoning any attempt to recover the Red Tower Pass, instead marching southeastwards across the Făgăraș Mountains, thus turning the pass. Due to a lack of good roads, Falkenhayn had judged such a maneuver impossible. The strenuous efforts of fresh Romanian forces to clear the Red Tower Pass from the south did not succeed in freeing that highway, though they did much to ensure the Romanian retreat to the southeast. The German force in the mountains was too weak for its task. It was not strong enough at the beginning of the battle, let alone after the Romanians had been reinforced. It was probably impossible to throw stronger forces against the Red Tower Pass, a decisive victory being therefore beyond Falkenhayn's powers. He was thus unable to reap all the benefits from his successful surprise. Although the Romanian I Corps was thoroughly beaten in this battle, the German forces which operated against its rear were too weak to achieve its annihilation. In consequence, the Romanian troops which defeated the first Central Powers offensive south of the Red Tower Pass in late October were those beaten at Sibiu in September. Although this victory was not decisive in the sense intended by von Falkenhayn, it was still decisive in that it compelled the Romanian abandonment of Transylvania. As early as 2 October, impressed by the defeat at Sibiu, the Romanians had abandoned the idea of continuing the offensive.

On 19 September, after entering Petroșani on the 18th, the Germans took the Surduc Pass as the inexperienced General Muică – commander of the Romanian 11th Division – retreated back across the border. On 20 September, the Viennese newspaper Neue Freie Presse read: "As far as one can say at present the Rumanians generally fight very well. Reports have reached us from the Hatszeg sector about Romanian units which, having lost half their effectives, still continued the battle. Similar facts have been observed in other sectors." That same day, the Romanian forces evacuated Petroșani. An Austro-Hungarian communique of the 20th announced the reoccupation of Petroșani. On the following day, a Berlin telegram announced that both sides of the Vulcan Pass had been taken. However, on the 22nd, the Romanians were still fighting at this point. In taking the Vulcan Pass, the Germans also captured 526 Romanian prisoners. On 22 September, two German battalions stormed the Vulcan Pass. These along with two batteries were the only German forces left in the area, after the other four battalions were shifted to Sibiu. Falkenhayn left Colonel Berger's Austro-Hungarian 144th Infantry Brigade in command at Petroșani. Sympathetic ethnic-Romanians living in the region immediately made General Culcer's headquarters aware that the bulk of the Germans had pulled out of the area. The Romanian general promptly took advantage of this development. Personally directing the operations of the 11th Division, Culcer attacked on 25 September, retaking Petroșani by the end of the day. Also on the 25th, the two mountains passes (Surduc and Vulcan) were likewise regained. A successful Romanian encircling movement rendered untenable the position of the Central Powers in the passes. To avoid being cut off in the defiles south of Petroșani, the Germans hastily retreated. Berlin and Vienna acknowledged the evacuation of the Surduc and Vulcan passes on 26 September. The Romanians encountered and overcame a formidable opposition on the part of the Germans. The Central Powers were driven back to Merișor. The Romanians captured several hundred prisoners and seven machine-guns. By Culcer's own admission, after taking Merișor, his troops massacred 80 German prisoners and several officers. Certain sources appear to be surprised by the Romanian success, that – after being overwhelmed by the artillery used against his forces during what was at the time General Falkenhayn's main blow – Culcer was "even able" to make some headway against his opponents. The Germans sent the newly formed 301st Division to take charge at Petroșani. This division had no units other than a headquarters staff, its function being to provide an additional control element. From Bosnia, the Austro-Hungarians brought the 2nd Mountain Brigade, with five battalions. Although largely Austro-Hungarian in composition, it was a German general who was in command of this enlarged Central Powers force in the region. The Central Powers attack began on 30 September, starting the third and final battle for Petroșani. The Austro-Hungarian 144th Brigade fought at Petrila at the beginning of October. On 1 October, the Germans reached Petroșani. The fighting for Petroșani itself took place between 1 and 3 October. The Romanian communique of 4 October announced the Romanian withdrawal from the region, but not before destroying Petroșani's coal mines. The battle ended on 5 October, with both Petroșani and the Surduc Pass being recaptured by the Central Powers. The Romanians succeeded in destroying the town's vital coal mines before retreating.

== Final battles and relief (October 1916) ==
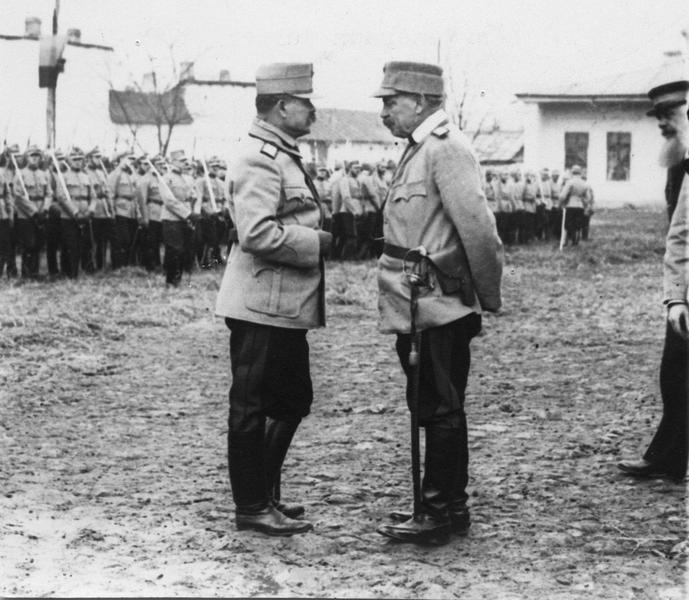
Generals Culcer and Paraschiv Vasilescu, December 6, 1916

On 23 October, a German-led and mostly German force launched the First Battle of the Jiu Valley. Culcer's forces were outnumbered, outgunned and lacked reserves. As such, Culcer suggested retreating, asking for the King's permission to pull the 1st Army out from Oltenia, and was promptly relieved of command on 24 October. The head of the French military mission to Romania, General Henri Mathias Berthelot, was the one who called for Culcer's relief. King Ferdinand agreed. Culcer's command lasted just long enough to see the repulse of the first Central Powers offensive south of the Red Tower Pass. The I Corps – the unit beaten at Sibiu in September – brought the offensive of the Alpine Corps to an end by the 23rd.

== Later life ==
In 1918, Culcer served as Minister for Public Works, in the cabinet of Alexandru Averescu.

In 1923 he became a senator. He died in 1928 and was buried in the Heroes' Cemetery in Târgu Jiu.

== Public honors ==
A street in Bucharest's Sector 6 bears Culcer's name. In the 2000s, an Army Corps of the Romanian Army bore his name.

== Sources ==
- Ioan Culcer (1919). Note și cugetări asupra campaniei din 1916, în special asupra operațiunilor Armatei I-a. Iași: Tipografia ziarului Tribuna. OCLC 923810931.
- Ioan Culcer (1923). Recenzie asupra răsboiului pentru întregirea României. București: Imprimeriile "Independența". OCLC 1079262893.
- Paul Crokaert (1925). Brialmont; éloge et mémoires. Bruxelles: A. Lesigne. pp. 448, 449, 460, 468. OCLC 19584026.
- Ioan Scurtu (1978). Presărați pe-a lor morminte ale laurilor foi: eroi ai luptei pentru independența și unitatea patriei (1916–1917). București: Editura Albatros. OCLC 4906615.
- Gabriel Culcer (2013). Chipuri din bătrâni (III ed.). Cluj-Napoca. pp. 171–187. ISBN 9789730147506. OCLC 967957104.
