= David Praporgescu =

Romanian general (1865–1916)

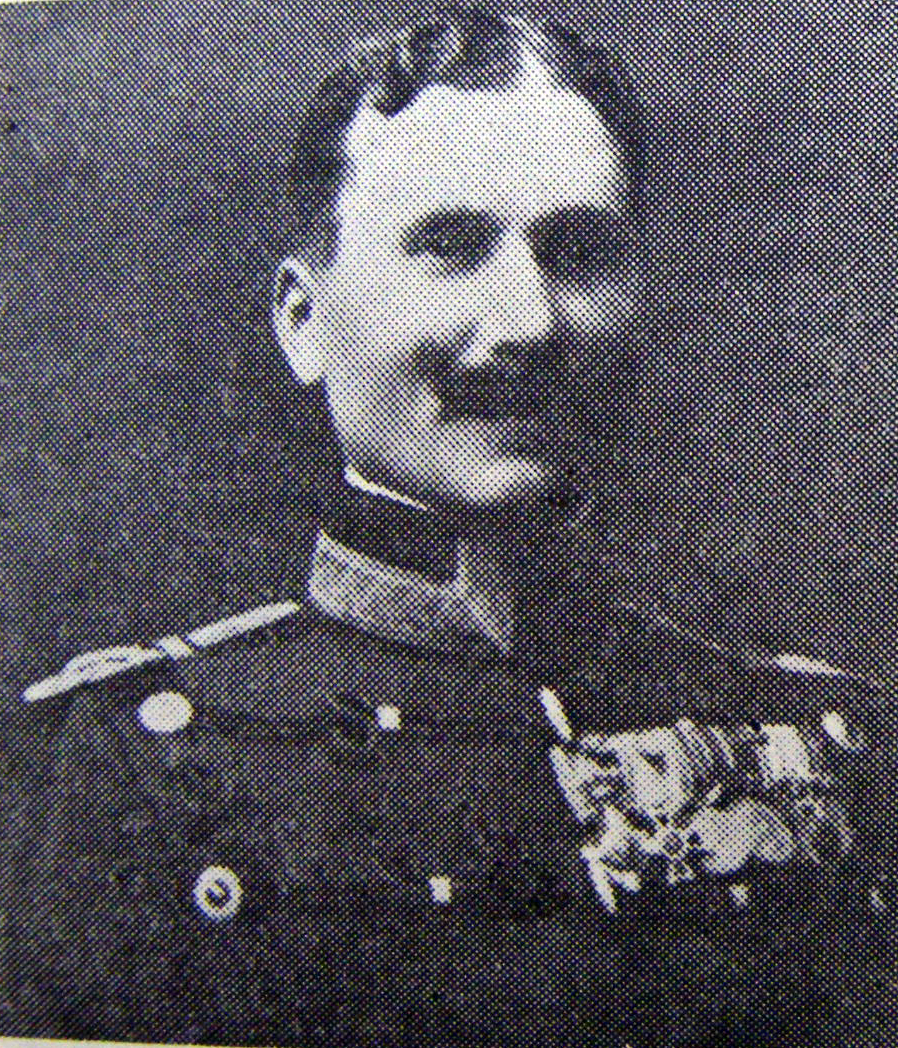
- General David Praporgescu
- Born: 13 December 1865; Turnu Măgurele, Teleorman County, Romania
- Died: 13 October 1916 (aged 50); Câineni, Argeș County, United Principalities of Moldavia and Wallachia
- Burial place: Bellu Cemetery, Bucharest
- Education: Saumur Cavalry School; Higher War School
- Children: Maria, Barbu
- Military career
- Allegiance: Romanian Army
- Branch: Infantry
- Service years: 1885–1916
- Rank: Brigadier general
- Unit: 1st Army Corps
- Conflicts: Second Balkan War; World War I; Romanian campaign
- Awards: Order of the Crown (Romania), Officer class (1907); Order of the Star of Romania, Officer class (1913); Order of Michael the Brave, 3rd Class (1927)

David Praporgescu (13 December 1865 – 13 October 1916) was a Romanian brigadier general during World War I, who was killed in action at the start of the Battle of the Southern Carpathians.

== Biography ==
=== Early life ===
He was born in Turnu Măgurele, Teleorman County, in a peasant family. (Various sources give his birthdate as either 10 or 13 December, in either 1865 or 1866.) He went to study in Bucharest, after which he returned to teach at a school in Lița, near his native town. In September 1885 he enlisted as a volunteer soldier in the 11th Călărași Regiment in Botoșani. In 1888, after having reached the rank of sergeant, he was approved to go directly to the graduation exam at the Military School of Infantry and Cavalry in Bucharest; he ranked first out of a graduating class of 100, and was promoted to second lieutenant on 1 October 1888.

=== Military training and career ===
For the next two years Praporgescu attended the Cavalry Special School in Bucharest, from which he also graduated as head of promotion. After advancing in rank to lieutenant in 1893, he was sent in 1894 to train at the Saumur Cavalry School in France, after which he continued with the 5th Dragoon Regiment in Compiègne. Upon his return to Romania, he attended the Higher War School and was promoted to captain in 1898. Between 1902 and 1903, he was sent for another training course with the Austro-Hungarian army. In the following years he advanced in rank to major (1906), lieutenant colonel (1909), and colonel (1912).

Praporgescu taught at military schools, being head of department and professor of cavalry and cavalry weapon tactics at the School of Infantry and Cavalry Officers between 1903 and 1908, and head of the cavalry tactics department at the Higher War School. During the Second Balkan War of 1913 he commanded the 4th Roșiori Regiment, and in 1915 he took command of the 4th Călărași Brigade. In 1916 he was promoted to brigadier general, and shortly after, on 1 July 1916, he became commanding officer of the 2nd Roșiori Brigade.

=== World War I ===
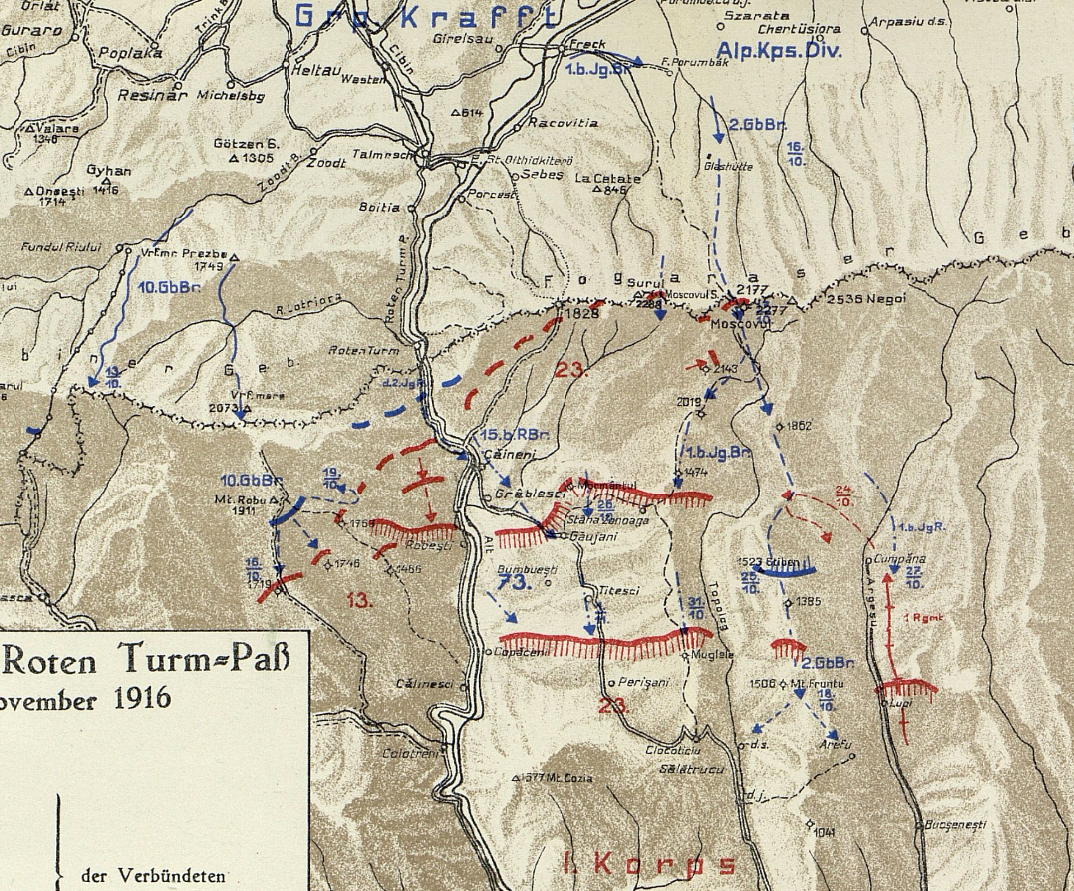
Battle of the Olt Valley (Câineni is in the center)

At the onset of the Romanian Campaign of World War I, Praporgescu was named commander of the 20th Infantry Division, which was part of the Romanian 1st Army, under the command of General Ioan Culcer. The campaign started on 27 August 1916 with the Battle of Transylvania. After the Romanian forces launched an offensive towards Sibiu and defeated the defending Austro-Hungarian troops, a counter-offensive was launched by the 9th German Army under the command of Erich von Falkenhayn. From 26 to 29 September Praporgescu's troops, including those of the 23rd Division under the command of Colonel Traian Moșoiu, fought tenaciously in the Olt and Topolog valleys, blocking an attempted breakthrough by the Bavarian Alpenkorps.

On 30 September Praporgescu took command of the 1st Army Corps, and participated in several of the skirmishes preceding the Battle of the Southern Carpathians. His 20th Division remained a part of the 1st Army, joining the other two divisions of the 1st Army Corps. By his actions, he infused new courage and energy into his subordinates. On 13 October 1916, during an engagement at the Turnu Roșu Pass, he went to inspect the troops in the Coți Mountains, at the western end of the Făgăraș Mountains, up from Câinenii Mici. While there, he was mortally wounded in the chest by a shrapnel from a stray artillery shell. He was buried three days later at Bellu Cemetery, in Bucharest.

=== Personal life ===
Praporgescu had a daughter, Maria, and a son, Barbu, who had his own military career, rising to the rank of colonel. In the early 1960s Barbu Praporgescu met and married in Lățești Elena Ilinoiu Codreanu, the widow of Corneliu Zelea Codreanu.

== Awards ==
In 1907 Praporgescu was awarded the Order of the Crown, Officer class. For his service during the Second Balkan War he was awarded in 1913 the Order of the Star of Romania, Officer class, and the "Country's Upsurge" Medal. On 2 March 1927 he was awarded posthumously the Order of Michael the Brave, 3rd class, for his bravery and leadership during the campaign of 1916.

== Legacy ==
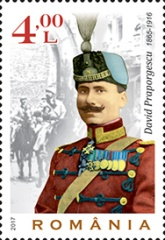
Postage stamp from 2017 (Scott #7304)

A village in Cerna commune, Tulcea County is named after him, and so is a street in downtown Bucharest, connecting C. A. Rosetti Street to Batiștei Street. Other streets named after Praporgescu can be found in Arad, Brăila, Oradea, Râmnicu Vâlcea, and Turnu Măgurele. There are also high schools in Bucharest and in his native town named after him.

A monument in his honor (a cross) was erected in 1924 in Câineni, then in Argeș County, now in Vâlcea County. In 1974 a bust of him – work of sculptor Gheorghe Iliescu-Călinești – was unveiled in Turnu Măgurele.

In 2017, Poșta Română issued a 4 lei stamp in his honor, part of the "Eternal Glory to the First World War Heroes" series, which also includes Generals Ion Dragalina and Radu R. Rosetti.
