= Battle of Kolun =

World War I battle, September 1916

- Part of the Battle of Transylvania of the Romanian Campaign of World War I
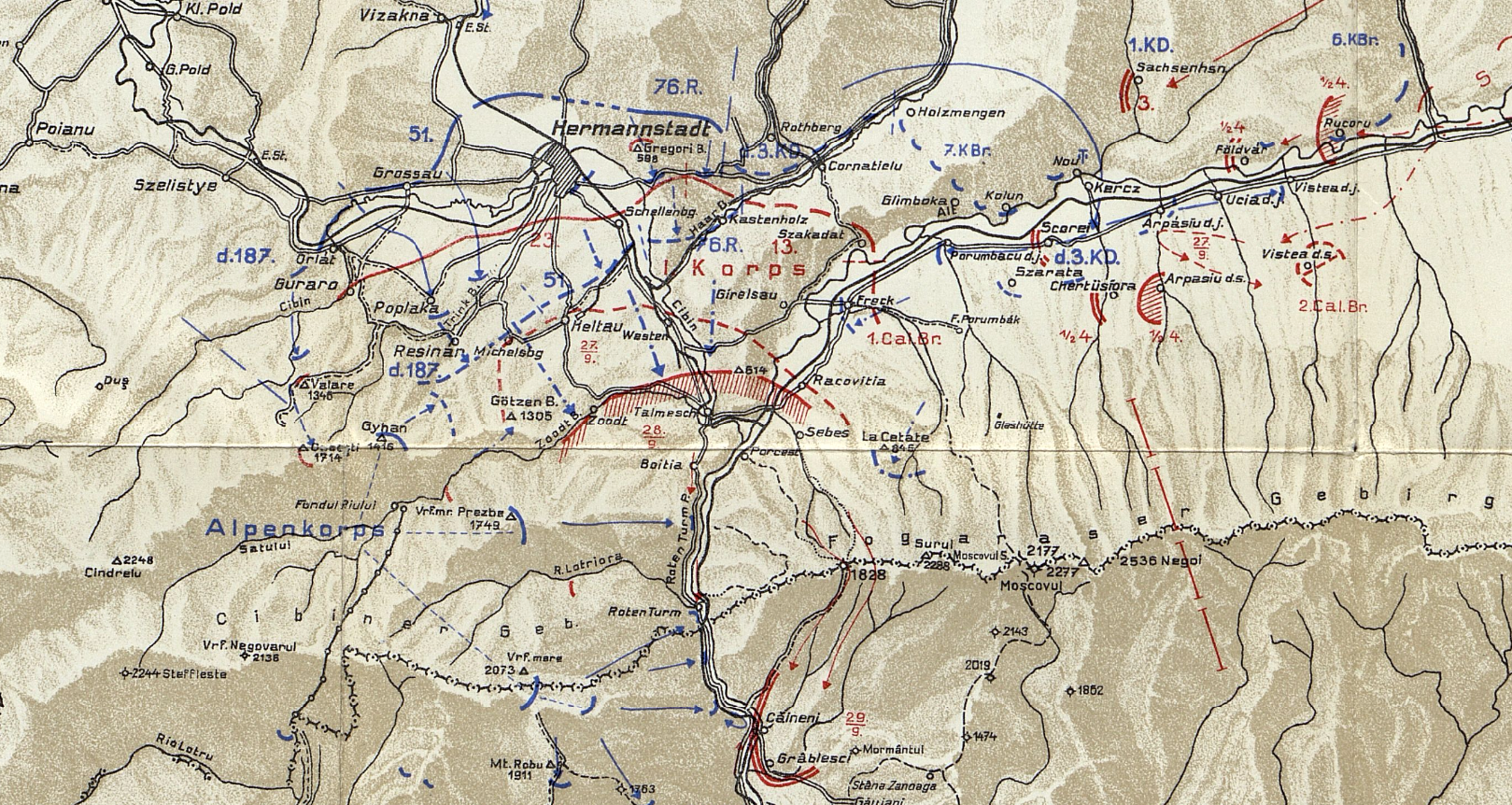
- Kolun visible on the north-eastern part of this map
Date	25 September 1916
Location	Kolun, Transylvania, Austria-Hungary (today Colun, Sibiu County, Romania)
Result	Central Powers victory

Belligerents
Romania	Germany; Austria-Hungary

Commanders and leaders
(Kingdom of Romania) Ioan Culcer (Kingdom of Romania) Ioan Popovici	(German Empire) Erich von Falkenhayn (German Empire) Eberhard Graf von Schmettow

Units involved
1st Army: I Corps; 13th Division	9th Army: Cavalry Corps Schmettow

Casualties and losses
Unknown	Unknown

The Battle of Kolun was a World War I military engagement fought between Romanian and Central Powers forces (Germany and Austria-Hungary). It was part of the wider Battle of Transylvania and resulted in a tactical victory for the Central Powers.

== Background ==
On 27 August 1916, Romania joined World War I on the side of the Allies by invading Transylvania, at that time part of the Hungarian half of Austria-Hungary. The advance of the Romanian 1st Army north of the Turnu Roșu Pass came to a halt on 10 September, when Sellenberk (Șelimbăr/Schellenberg) was taken.

In mid-September, General Ioan Culcer — the commander of the Romanian 1st Army — moved the I Corps headquarters (General Ioan Popovici) to Nagytalmács (Tălmaciu/Talmesch), to direct the operations of the two divisions located there. Popovici and his staff arrived in Nagytalmács on 16 September. Popovici had two divisions, the 13th Division of General Ioan Oprescu being the one deployed to the east.

On 19 September, General Erich von Falkenhayn assumed command of the German 9th Army. Among the units of this army was the Schmettow Cavalry Corps, comprising the 1st Austro-Hungarian and 3rd German Cavalry Division, both under von Schmettow's command, the 3rd Division's commander. As part of von Falkenhayn's plan for the Battle of Nagyszeben, von Schmettow had to block any reinforcements that might have come from the Romanian 2nd Army, threatening the 9th Army's vulnerable flank.

== Battle ==
The left of the Central Powers forces - the German column which was to encircle the Romanians from the east - succeeded in forcing the crossing of the Olt River at Kolun (Colun/Kellen), east of Porumbák (Porumbacu/Bornbach). Thus, an effective barrier was created between the 1st and the 2nd Romanian armies. In its advance across the mountain ridge separating the valleys of the Hortobágy (Hârtibaciu/Haarbach) and Olt Rivers, this German column was faced with determined resistance. Still, its numerical superiority enabled it to prevail. By the evening of 25 September, Kolun was in German hands.

== Aftermath ==
Although von Falkenhayn's left succeeded in cutting any communication with the 2nd Army, it failed to execute a proper flanking movement. Von Falkenhayn had judged a withdrawal over the Făgăraș Mountains as impossible, due to a lack of good roads. However, this area was precisely the place through which the Romanians retreated, with the loss of "only" 3,000 unwounded prisoners and 13 guns.
