= First Battle of Petrozsény =

Battle in 1916

- Part of the Battle of Transylvania of the Romanian Campaign of World War I
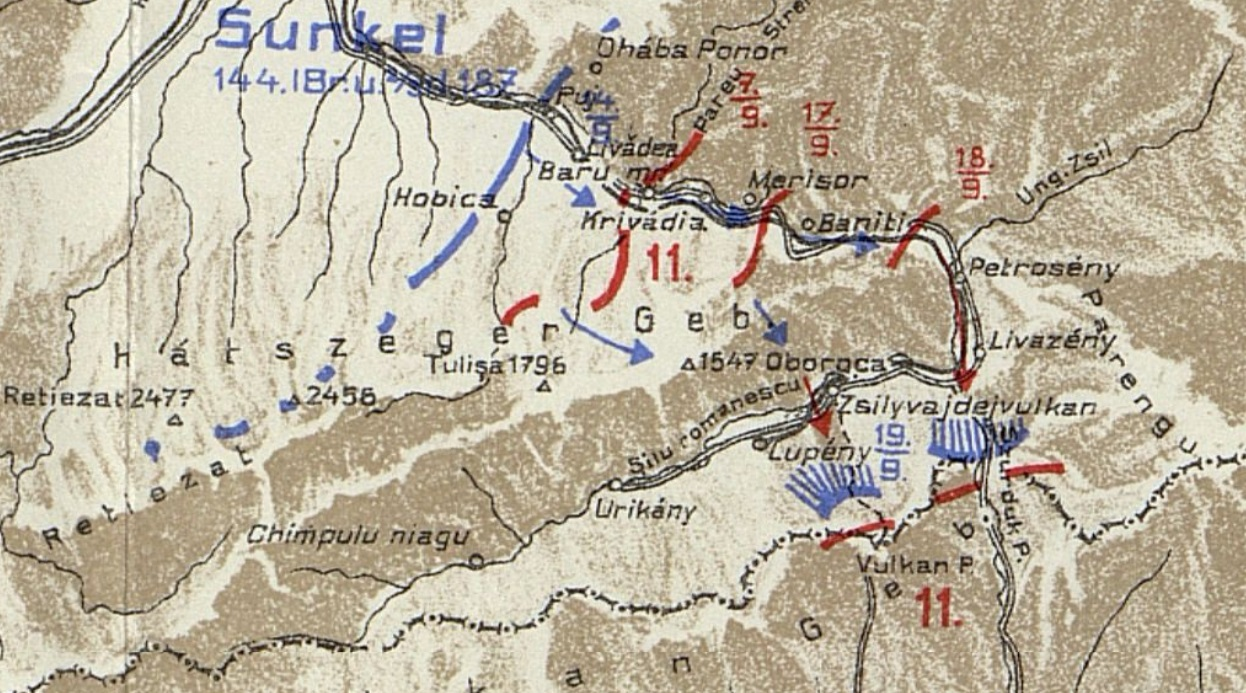
- Course of the battle from 17 to 19 September
Date	17 – 22 September 1916
Location	Petrozsény and the surrounding area, Transylvania, Austria-Hungary (today Petroșani, Romania)
Result	German victory

Belligerents
Romania	German Empire

Commanders and leaders
(Kingdom of Romania) Ioan Culcer (Kingdom of Romania) Ioan Muică	(German Empire) Erich von Falkenhayn (German Empire) Hermann von Staabs (German Empire) Edwin Sunkel

Units involved
1st Army: 11th Division	9th Army: XXXIX Reserve Corps; 187th Division; 187th Regiment; 189th Regiment; Artillery units; Alpine Corps; Jäger Regiment

Casualties and losses
Unknown, but heavy Vulcan Pass (21–22 September): 526 prisoners	Unknown

The First Battle of Petrozsény was a military engagement fought between Romanian forces on one side and German forces on the other side. It was part of the 1916 Battle of Transylvania, itself part of the Romanian Campaign of World War I. This was a German attack which drove off the Romanian forces from the Transylvanian coal mining center of Petrozsény (the present-day city of Petroșani in Hunedoara County, Romania). Although a Romanian counterattack a few days later undid most of their gains, the main strategic objective of the Central Powers had been nevertheless achieved.

== Background ==
The Kingdom of Romania joined the Allies and declared war on the Central Powers on 27 August 1916. Immediately after, it proceeded to invade the region of Transylvania. On 29 August, the Romanian I Corps of the 1st Army (led by General Ioan Culcer) defeated the Hungarian coal miner battalions defending the vital Transylvanian coal mining center at Petrozsény (Petroșani), inflicting heavy losses, and occupied the town.

Given that this was a region of valuable coal mines which were vital for the Hungarian railways, this was the area where the first Central Powers counterattack against the Romanian offensive in Transylvania was launched. Taking place on 8 September, it was also the first military engagement during the Battle of Transylvania to involve German forces, three days after the first German unit to arrive in Transylvania unloaded at Marosillye (Ilia) on 5 September. Despite German support, the Austro-Hungarian commander of the 144th Infantry Brigade, Colonel Ludwig Berger, "inexplicably" ordered a retreat. Thus, the Romanian troops had little difficulty repulsing the first Central Powers counterattack against their invasion of Transylvania. Following up on their success, the Romanian units gained further ground, along with 305 prisoners, 2 guns and some machine guns. On 12 September, Romanian outposts reached Puj (Pui). By 12 September, three-fourths of the distance between the Transylvanian border and the vital junction of Hátszeg (Hațeg) had been covered by the Romanian Army.

German General Hermann von Staabs, the commander of the XXXIX Corps which had assumed responsibility on 8 September for operations in the southern region of Transylvania, reacted quickly to the Austrian withdrawal. Aside from the Austro-Hungarian 144th Infantry Brigade and the German 187th Regiment of the German 187th Infantry Division (the first German unit to enter Transylvania), von Staabs also sent to Puj the 189th Regiment, the artillery belonging to the 187th Division, as well as the Bavarian light infantry regiment of the Alpenkorps (the first unit of the Alpenkorps to arrive in Transylvania). This force, commanded by Major General Edwin Sunkel (the commander of the German 187th Infantry Division), began its advance on 14 September. Meantime the Romanian forces in the area were severely reduced.

At the beginning of September, the Romanian units in the area comprised the bulk of General Culcer's 1st Army: the 2nd, 11th and 12th Divisions. However, following the Romanian defeat at the Battle of Turtucaia in the Dobruja, the 2nd and 12th divisions were transferred to the south. The transfer of Culcer's two divisions started before 9 September. On the 9th, Major Radu R. Rosetti from the Romanian headquarters stated to General Andrei Zayonchkovski – the Russian commander of the Dobruja Army – that the 2nd and 12th Divisions "were coming from Transylvania". The remaining 11th Division in the Petrozsény sector was commanded by General Ioan Muică. Culcer also involved himself more directly in local operations by sending the command of the I Corps – the group of Romanian 1st Army divisions operating in Transylvania – to Nagytalmács (Tălmaciu/Talmesch), to direct the operations of the two divisions located there. Initially, the I Corps directed operations in both the area around Petrozsény (Jiu Valley) and the area around Nagytalmács (Olt Valley). General Ioan Popovici, commander of the I Corps, arrived in Nagytalmács along with his staff on 16 September.

On 14 September, both the German and Austro-Hungarian troops advanced against the Romanian positions. However, during the two-day battle on 14-15 September, the Austro-Hungarian component of this force was defeated. An entirely German force resumed the attack several days later, starting the First Battle of Petrozsény.

== Battle ==
On 17 September, heavy fighting was underway at Merisor. On 18 September, after heavy fighting, the large German force commanded by General von Staabs pushed the Romanian troops back and entered Petrozsény. The inexperienced Romanian 11th Division commander, Brigadier General Ioan Muică, retreated to Bumbești, allowing Sunkel's troops to take the Szurdok (Surduc) Pass on the following day. On 19 September, Erich von Falkenhayn assumed command of the German 9th Army. In his memoirs, Erich Ludendorff stated that, on 19 September, the German troops were successful in throwing back the Romanian units near Petrozsény over the mountain ridge. Romanian forces still remained in the region, however. On 19 September, the Romanian front extended from Petrozsény to Mount Tulisini (Tulișa).

On 20 September, the Viennese newspaper Neue Freie Presse read: "As far as one can say at present the Rumanians generally fight very well. Reports have reached us from the Hatszeg sector about Romanian units which, having lost half their effectives, still continued the battle. Similar facts have been observed in other sectors." That same day, the Romanian forces evacuated Petrozsény. An Austro-Hungarian communique of the 20th announced the reoccupation of Petrozsény. On 21 September, a Berlin dispatch announced that the Vulcan Pass was taken by German forces. However, on the following day, the Romanian units were still fighting at this point. On 22 September, two German battalions stormed the Vulcan Pass. In taking the Vulcan Pass, the Germans also captured 526 Romanian prisoners.

== Aftermath ==
On 19 September, Brigadier-General Ioan Muică's 11th Division abandoned the Szurdok Pass, retreating to Bumbești, back across the border. Apparently, this action was not part of the plan of Muică's superior, General Ioan Culcer. This is evidenced by the fact that, during the 11th Division's successful counterattack launched on 25 September, it was Culcer himself who directed operations. The relieved Muică was ultimately replaced by General Dumitru Cocorăscu.

The three divisions of the 9th Army concentrating at Szászsebes (Sebeș/Mühlbach) could be enveloped by the Romanian forces from the region of the two mountain passes, and – according to German planning – this was the possibility to be dealt with first. Thus, even though the Romanian Army succeeded in recovering the Szurdok and Vulcan passes on 25 September, these had lost some of their importance by then. Despite being driven back to Merisor, the Central Powers had achieved their main strategic purpose, neutralizing the Romanian forces in the region while their own forces were engaged elsewhere.
