= Battle of Nagybár =

Battle in WWI

- Part of the Battle of Transylvania of the Romanian Campaign of World War I
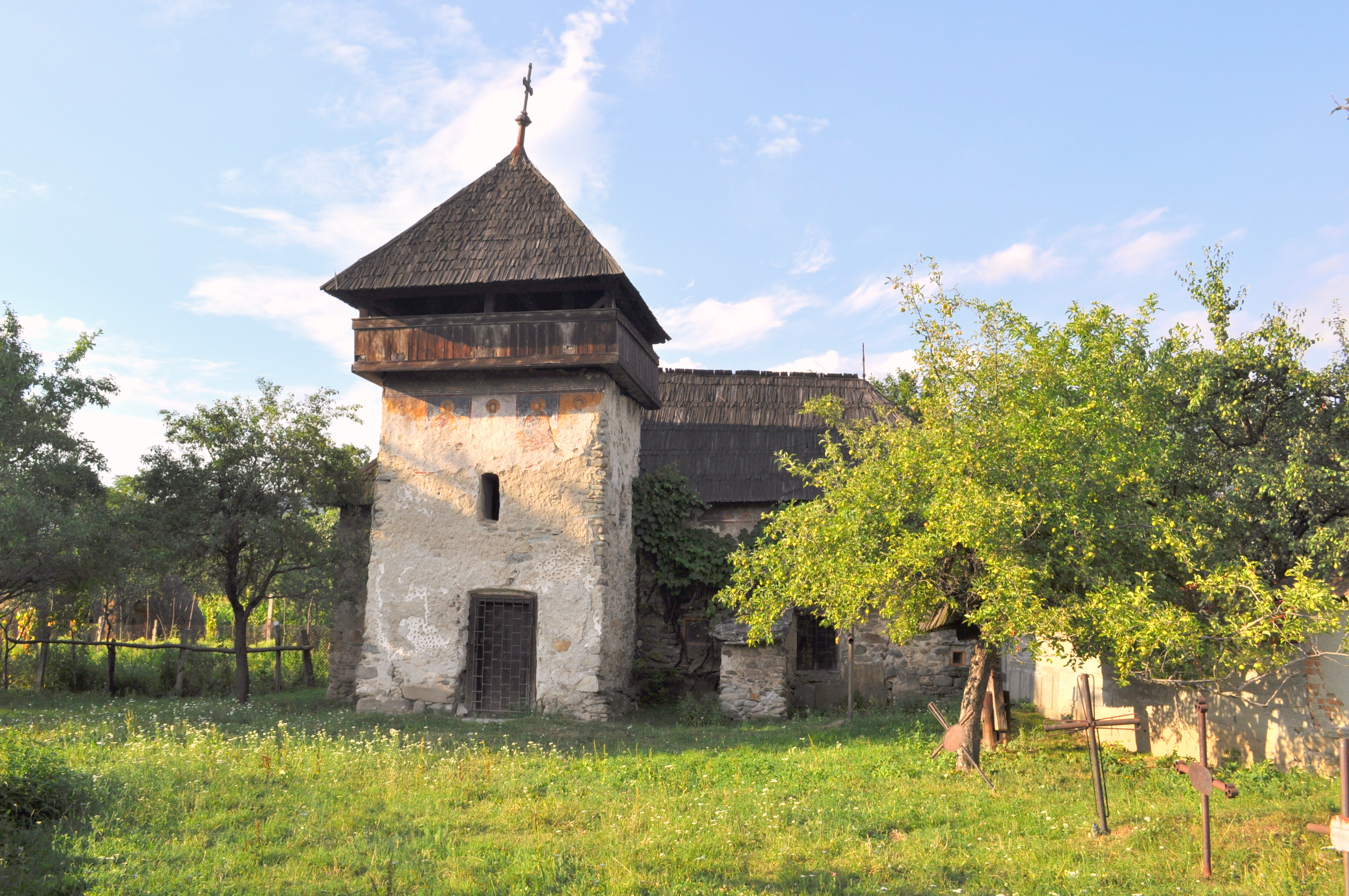
- The old church in Baru (Nagybár)
Date	14–15 September 1916
Location	Nagybár and the surrounding area, Transylvania, Austria-Hungary (today Baru, Hunedoara, Romania)
Result	Romanian victory

Belligerents
Romania	German Empire; Austria-Hungary

Commanders and leaders
(Kingdom of Romania) Ioan Culcer (Kingdom of Romania) Ioan Muică	(German Empire) Hermann von Staabs (German Empire) Edwin Sunkel (Austria-Hungary) Ludwig Berger

Units involved
1st Army: 11th Division	XXXIX Reserve Corps: 187th Division; 187th Regiment; 189th Regiment; Artillery units; Alpine Corps; Jäger Regiment; 144th Austro-Hungarian Infantry Brigade

Casualties and losses
Unknown, but heavy	Unknown

The Battle of Nagybár was a military engagement between Romanian forces on one side and Central Powers forces (Germany and Austria-Hungary) on the other side. It was part of the 1916 Battle of Transylvania during the Romanian Campaign of World War I. The battle resulted in a Romanian victory.

== Background ==
Romania declared war on the Central Powers on 27 August 1916, and proceeded to invade the Hungarian region of Transylvania. On 29 August, the Romanian I Corps of the 1st Army (General Ioan Culcer) defeated the Hungarian coal miner battalions defending the vital Transylvanian coal mining center at Petrozsény (Petroșani), inflicting heavy losses, and occupied the town. Given that this was a region of valuable coal mines which were vital for the Hungarian railways, this was the area where the first Central Powers counterattack against the Romanian invasion of Transylvania was launched. Taking place on 8 September, it was also the first military engagement during the Battle of Transylvania to involve German forces, three days after the first German unit to arrive in Transylvania unloaded at Marosillye (Ilia) on 5 September. Despite German support, the Austro-Hungarian commander of the 144th Infantry Brigade, Colonel Ludwig Berger, "inexplicably" ordered a retreat. Thus, the Romanians had little difficulty repulsing the first Central Powers counterattack against their invasion of Transylvania. Following up on their success, the Romanians gained further ground, along with 305 prisoners, 2 guns and some machine guns. On 12 September, Romanian outposts reached Puj (Pui). By 12 September, three-fourths of the distance between the Transylvanian border and the vital junction of Hátszeg (Hațeg) had been covered by the Romanians.

German General Hermann von Staabs, the commander of the XXXIX Corps which had assumed responsibility on 8 September for operations in the southern region of Transylvania, reacted quickly to the Austrian withdrawal. Aside from the Austro-Hungarian 144th Infantry Brigade and the German 187th Regiment of the German 187th Infantry Division (the first German unit to enter Transylvania), von Staabs also sent to Puj the 189th Regiment, the artillery belonging to the 187th Division, as well as the Bavarian light infantry regiment of the Alpenkorps (the first unit of the Alpenkorps to arrive in Transylvania). This force, commanded by Major General Edwin Sunkel(the commander of the German 187th Infantry Division), began its advance on 14 September. Meantime the Romanian forces in the area were severely reduced. At the beginning of September, the Romanian units in the area comprised the bulk of General Culcer's 1st Army: the 2nd, 11th and 12th Divisions. However, following the Romanian defeat in the Dobruja, the 2nd and 12th divisions were transferred to the south. The transfer of Culcer's two divisions started before 9 September. On the 9th, Major Radu R. Rosetti from the Romanian headquarters stated to General Andrei Zayonchkovski — the Russian commander in Dobruja — that the 2nd and 12th Divisions "were coming from Transylvania". The remaining 11th Division in the Petrozsény sector was commanded by General Ioan Muică. Culcer also involved himself more directly in local operations by sending the command of the I Corps — the group of Romanian 1st Army divisions operating in Transylvania — to Nagytalmács (Tălmaciu/Talmesch), to direct the operations of the two divisions located there. Initially, the I Corps directed operations in both the area around Petrozsény (Jiu Valley) and the area around Nagytalmács (Olt River Valley). General Ioan Popovici, commander of the I Corps, arrived in Nagytalmács along with his staff on 16 September.

== Battle ==
The Central Powers front on 14 September ran just outside Puj (Pui), immediately to the northwest of the village. On 14 September, the Germans and Austro-Hungarians began to advance along both sides of the Sztrigy (Strei) River. The battle lasted two days, ending on 15 September.

On 15 September, German and Hungarian forces advanced against Romanian positions near Nagybár (Baru). The Central Powers, disposing of an exceedingly strong concentration of mountain artillery and howitzers, delivered a frontal attack whose main weight was directed against the Romanian left center, around Mount Branu. After an entire day of very heavy fighting, the Romanians withdrew before the superior numbers of the Central Powers and their even more overwhelming superiority in artillery. The Romanian retreat from Nagybár was carried out with considerable skill and in perfect order. The Central Powers aimed to outflank the Romanians in the mountains, and reach the passes in their rear by a shortcut. Thus, the Central Powers force was divided in six columns, which attempted an extensive sweeping movement through the mountains. However, the Romanians kept their front intact, holding on strongly to the main range of the mountains as they executed a wheel to the right. The original Romanian front at Nagybár ran from north to south, but on 19 September the line extended from east to west, between Mount Tulisini (Tulișa) and Petrozsény (Petroșani). On 20 September, the Viennese newspaper Neue Freie Presse read: "As far as one can say at present the Rumanians generally fight very well. Reports have reached us from the Hatszeg sector about Romanian units which, having lost half their effectives, still continued the battle. Similar facts have been observed in other sectors.".

== Aftermath ==
On 14 September, both Germans and Austro-Hungarians advanced against the Romanians. However, during the two-day battle on 14–15 September, the Austro-Hungarian component of this force was defeated. An entirely German force resumed the attack on 18 September, starting the First Battle of Petrozsény.
