= Veresmart Offensive =

WW1 Military Engagement

- Part of the Battle of Transylvania of the Romanian Campaign of World War I
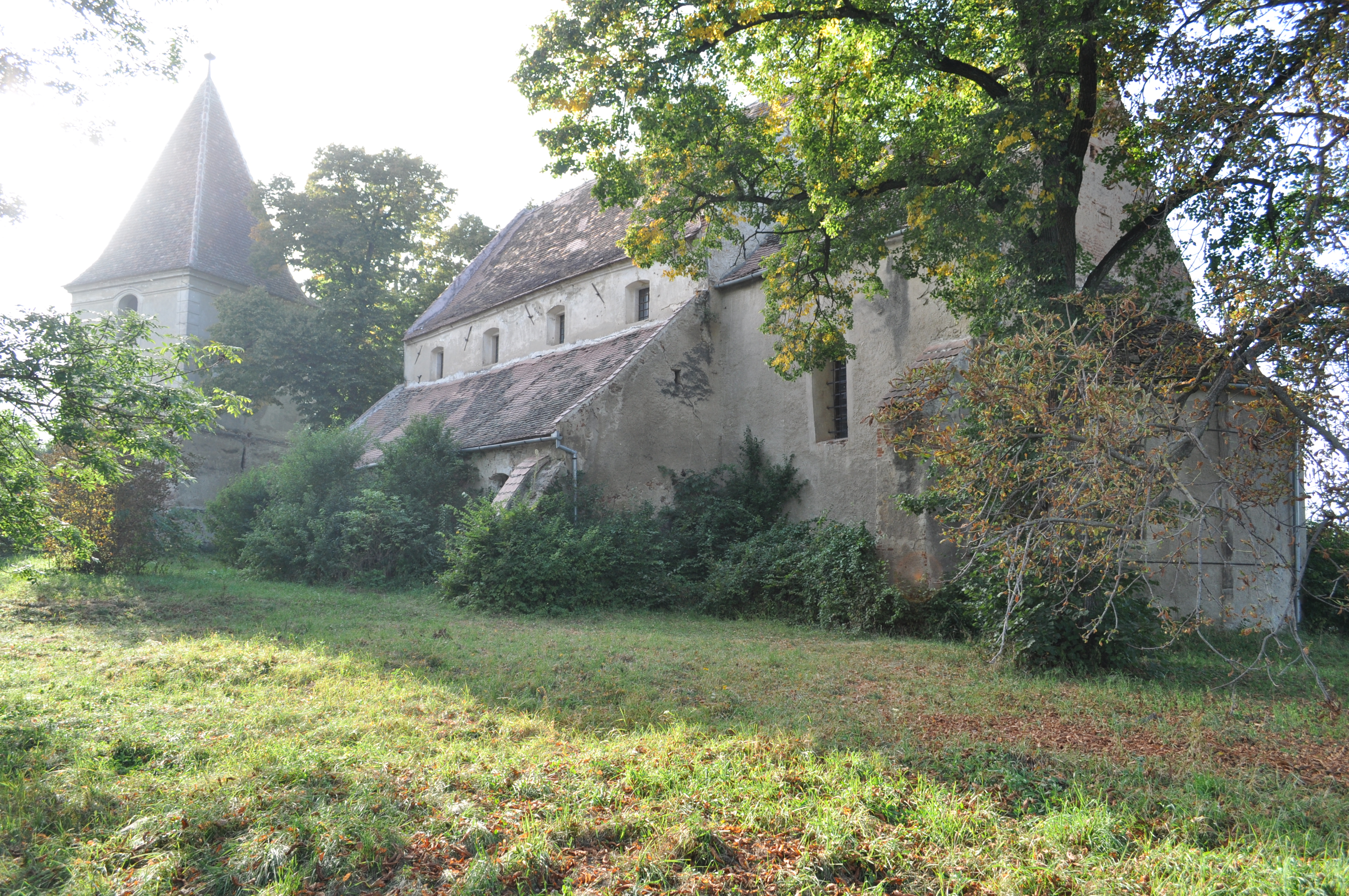
- Veresmart (Roșia) was the tactical goal of the Romanian offensive
Date	22 September 1916
Location	South of Veresmart, Transylvania, Austria-Hungary (today Roșia, Sibiu County, Romania)
Result	Romanian strategic victory

Belligerents
Romania	Germany; Austria-Hungary

Commanders and leaders
(Kingdom of Romania) Ioan Culcer (Kingdom of Romania) Ioan Popovici	(German Empire) Erich von Falkenhayn (German Empire) Eberhard Graf von Schmettow

Units involved
1st Army: I Corps; 13th Division	9th Army: Cavalry Corps Schmettow; 3rd German Cavalry Division; 1st Austro-Hungarian Cavalry Division

Casualties and losses
Unknown	Unknown

The Veresmart Offensive was a World War I military engagement between Romanian forces on one side and Central Powers forces (Germany and Austria-Hungary) on the other side. It was part of the larger Battle of Transylvania. Although the Romanians failed to reach their planned objective, the strategic situation of the Central Powers was significantly worsened by the Romanian attack. Nevertheless, the Romanian forces did not exploit their strategic success further.

== Background ==
At the onset of the Romanian Campaign, starting on 27 August 1916 with the Battle of Transylvania, the Romanian 1st Army, under the command of General Ioan Culcer, consisted of six divisions, of which four comprised the I Corps, led by General Ioan Popovici. In the middle of September, General Culcer moved the I Corps headquarters to Nagytalmács (Tălmaciu/Talmesch). General Popovici arrived in Nagytalmács along with his staff on 16 September. Popovici had two divisions under his command at Nagyszeben (Sibiu/Hermannstadt): the 13th and the 23rd. While concentrating their forces northwest of Nagyszeben in preparation for the impending battle for that city, the Germans kept the Romanians under artillery fire in order to keep them from sending out patrols that could have discovered the German build-up. Romanian frustration with having to endure this bombardment boiled over, and on 22 September General Popovici ordered his 13th Division to take the heights at Veresmart (Roșia/Rothberg), east of Nagyszeben. Although this action was against Culcer's orders, it was still Culcer himself who decided to appoint Popovici as commander of the two Romanian divisions headquartered at Nagytalmács.

The Romanians faced the cavalry formations of General Eberhard Graf von Schmettow. Von Schmettow's forces comprised the 1st Austro-Hungarian and 3rd German Cavalry Divisions. He was the commander of the 3rd Division, but both it and the 1st Austro-Hungarian were under his command.

== Romanian attack ==
The Romanian 13th Division attacked at dawn on 22 September, in order to gain surprise and avoid an artillery battle, for which it had insufficient ammunition. However, without an artillery preparation, the Central Powers positions remained unscathed, and their machine-gunners cut down the Romanians. In some areas, the fighting was intense, often hand-to-hand. In most places, the Romanians gained little or no territory. Popovici's only real success was attained south of Hortobágyfalva (Cornățel/Harbachdorf), where the Romanians faced the extremely thinly-held positions of the 7th Cavalry Brigade of the 1st Division.

== Aftermath ==
The expected continuation of the Romanian attack on 23 September did not take place.

The Romanian attack had driven a wedge between von Schmettow's two cavalry divisions, which — if exploited — could expose the flank of the 9th Army and ruin the plans to take Nagyszeben. The Romanian pressure was driving apart the 1st Austro-Hungarian and 9th German Armies. General Erich von Falkenhayn (9th Army) asked General Arthur Arz von Straussenburg (1st Army) to give him the arriving German 89th Division to fill the gap. Arz refused, stating that the 89th Division was his only reserve, and giving it away would fatally weaken his army. Arz's Chief of Staff, Colonel Josef Huber, doubted that the 1st Army could hold without the 89th Division. This admission unsettled von Falkenhayn, who contacted the German High Command and asked Erich Ludendorff for help. The latter sided with von Falkenhayn, giving him command of the division on 27 September. Falkenhayn also "grudgingly conceded" that Arz's 1st Army could withdraw its center if absolutely necessary, but not its right wing, which had to remain in contact with von Schmettow's cavalry in order to cover the rear of the 9th Army. Arz intended to use the German 89th Infantry Division to reinforce his center and left flank, hence why he was unwilling to comply. The OHL's support for Falkenhayn, however, left Arz with no choice but to comply.

In terms of territory, the Romanian gains appear to have consisted mainly of the village of Oltszakadát (Săcădate/Sekadaten). A pair of Austrian post-war military maps seem to attest this. The first map, showing the situation of the front lines in Transylvania up to 19 September, places the line of the Romanian front in the area just beyond Felek (Avrig/Freck). On the map, Felek is placed to the southwest of a northward-facing bend in the Olt (Alt) River. The Romanian front line extends just beyond Felek, to the southwestern end of this bend. The second map, depicting the 26-29 September Battle of Nagyszeben, shows that the Romanian front on 26 September extended to the northeastern end of this bend, just beyond the village of Oltszakadát.
