= Nagyszeben Offensive =

- Part of the Battle of Transylvania of the Romanian Campaign of World War I
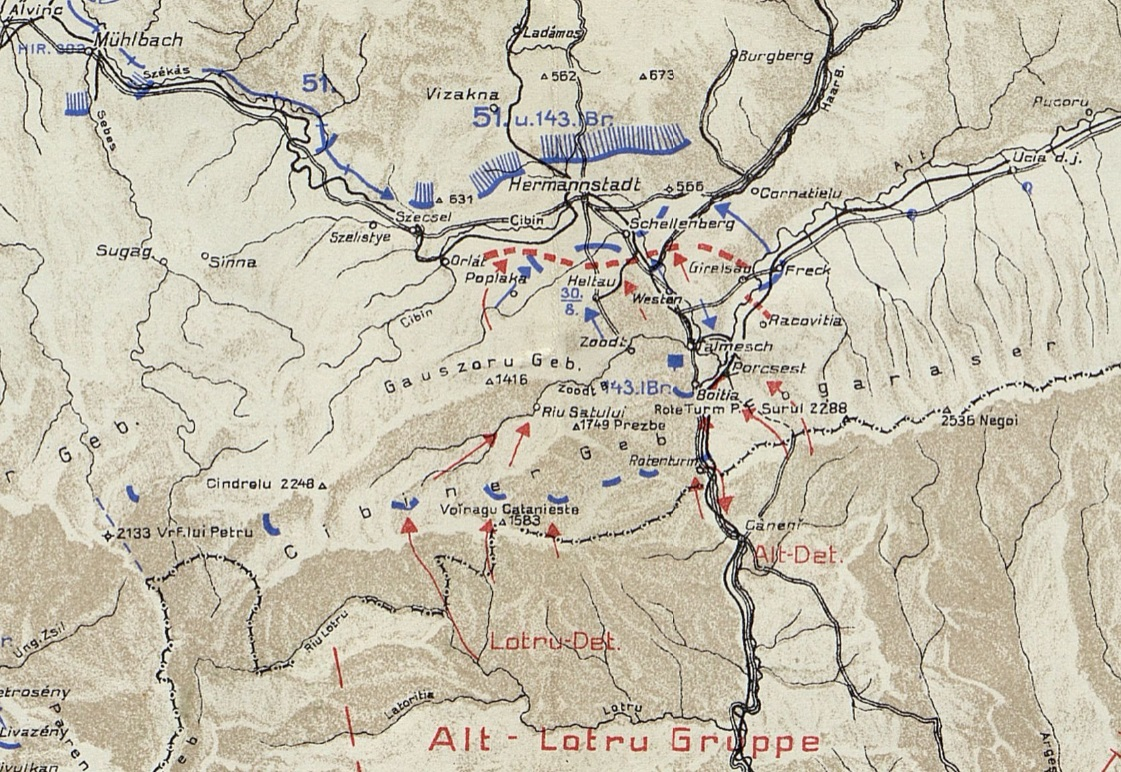
- The Romanian front north of the Red Tower Pass on 4 September
Date	27 August – 2 September 1916
Location	Southern half of Szeben County, Transylvania, Austria-Hungary, up to and including Nagyszeben itself (today in Sibiu County, Romania)
Result	Romanian victory

Belligerents
Romania	Austria-Hungary

Commanders and leaders
(Kingdom of Romania) Ioan Culcer (Kingdom of Romania) Traian Moșoiu (Kingdom of Romania) Gheorghe Cantacuzino-Grănicerul	(Austria-Hungary) Arthur Arz von Straussenburg (Austria-Hungary) Arnold Barwick (Austria-Hungary) Béla Tanárky

Units involved
1st Army: 1st Border Guard Regiment; 42nd Infantry Regiment; 5th Jäger Regiment; 2nd Infantry Regiment	1st Army: 44th Infantry Regiment; 143rd Brigade; 51st Honved Division

Casualties and losses
Unknown	Unknown; 1 rail-cruiser destroyed

The Nagyszeben Offensive was a Romanian military operation during the opening stages of the Battle of Transylvania, during the Romanian Campaign of 1916 in World War I. It was fought against Austro-Hungarian forces and resulted in a Romanian victory, the city of Nagyszeben (Sibiu/Hermannstadt) being reached within a week. A further week of minor operations following the one-day Romanian occupation of the city resulted in the stabilization of the Romanian front line in the region for the ensuing fortnight.

== Background ==
On 27 August 1916, the Kingdom of Romania declared war on Austria-Hungary and proceeded to invade the Hungarian region of Transylvania. The Romanian campaign plan called for the Olt-Lotru Group of the Romanian 1st Army under the command of General Ioan Culcer to secure the basin between Nagytalmács (Tălmaciu/Talmesch) and Nagyszeben (Sibiu/Hermannstadt). The area between Nagyszeben and the northern exit of the Turnu Roșu Pass was the designated assembly area for the 1st Army's Olt-Lotru Group. Opposing the Romanian invasion of Transylvania was the Austro-Hungarian 1st Army, led by General Arthur Arz von Straussenburg.

== Romanian offensive ==
Following Romania's declaration of war against Austria-Hungary on the evening of 27 August, General Culcer's Olt-Lotru Group began advancing towards Nagyszeben through the Turnu Roșu Pass. The Olt Group consisted of two columns. The easternmost one, comprising the 1st Border Guard Regiment under Lieutenant-Colonel Gheorghe Cantacuzino, crossed the mountains to the east of the Turnu Roșu Pass, using paths known only to the locals. Through the pass itself came up the 42nd Infantry Regiment, the second column of the Olt Group, departing from Titești. The attack of the 42nd Regiment took completely by surprise the Hungarian gendarmes guarding the border, and they swiftly withdrew several miles to the north, towards the Red Tower Fortress, where they encountered soldiers from the Austro-Hungarian 44th Infantry Regiment. Together, these units stopped the advance of the Olt Group's 2nd Column. Sporadic shooting followed throughout the night, but the Romanians resumed their attack in the morning. After an entire day of fighting, they finally drove the gendarmes and soldiers north and took the village at the head of the pass.

On 29 August, the Romanian regiment advanced towards Nagytalmács, where it joined the Lotru Group of Colonel Traian Moșoiu, consisting of the 5th Vânători and 2nd Infantry Regiments. At mid-day on 30 August, the Romanians arrived at Nagydisznód (Cisnădie/Heltau). Until the arrival of the Lotru Group, the Austro-Hungarians held their own, the Romanians making little progress against the spirited defenders of Colonel Arnold Barwick's 143rd Brigade. The Austro-Hungarians were reinforced that morning. General Arz sent the men of the 51st Honved Division by train to Nagyszeben, where they arrived on the morning of the 30th. Division commander General Béla Tanárky arrived later that day with grand plans to strike against the Romanians, but these were cancelled almost immediately due to the overwhelming Romanian numerical superiority. Tanárky's worn division had only 6,000 men, and most of them were still in transit. Fighting continued throughout the day as the Romanians tried to outflank the 51st Honved by pushing west of Nagydisznód. The arrival of Colonel Moșoiu's forces turned the tide for the Romanians, causing the Austro-Hungarians to retreat to the heights on both sides of the city. Instead of advancing into Nagyszeben, however, the Romanians started to dig in south of the city on the night of 30 August.

=== Destruction of the Motorkanonwagen ===
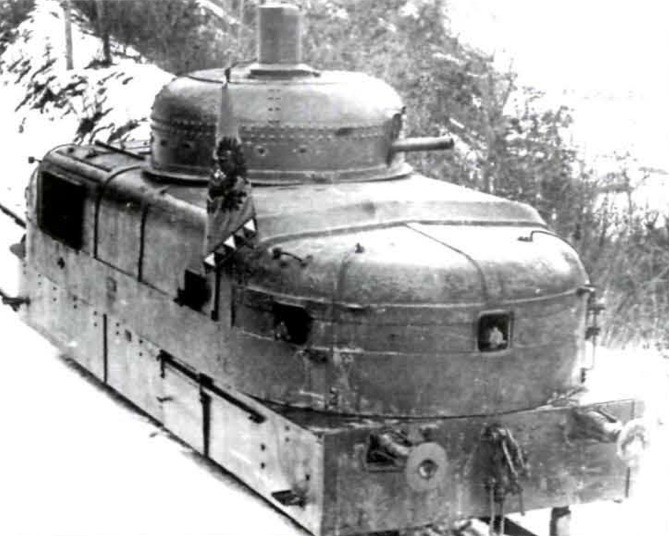
The Motorkanonwagen rail-cruiser before its destruction

The most notable armored trains of the First World War were the armored rail-cruisers built by Russia and Austria-Hungary. These rail cars were self-propelled and fitted with turreted weapons, thus resembling railroad tanks. One such Austro-Hungarian rail-cruiser was built in 1916. Dubbed the Motorkanonwagen ("motorized gun car"), it was the most futuristic of the Austro-Hungarian armored rail-cruisers, armed with a fully-rotating turret fitted with a 70 mm Škoda gun. The Motorkanonwagen was destroyed by Romanian artillery fire during the Romanian offensive into Transylvania. Four miles east of the Turnu Roșu Pass, the Romanian 1st Border Guard Regiment drove back a Hungarian battalion, taking two villages by dawn on the 28th. Thus, the Romanians had blocked the important railroad from Brassó (Brașov/Kronstadt) to Nagyszeben. The Austro-Hungarian commander at Nagyszeben, Colonel Arnold Barwick, sent the armored train that morning to see what had happened, but Cantacuzino's regiment set it ablaze, rendering it unserviceable and forcing the Austro-Hungarians to abandon it.

=== Shelling and capture of Nagyszeben (2 September) ===
On 2 September, Romanian guns bombarded Nagyszeben (Sibiu/Hermannstadt). That same day, the city was occupied by advanced troops of the Romanian 1st Army. Erich Ludendorff referred to this in his memoirs, stating that, after taking Brassó (Brașov/Kronstadt) on 29 August, "Rumanian patrols were soon seen in Hermannstadt.".

== Aftermath ==
Nagyszeben (Sibiu/Hermannstadt) was occupied on 2 September by the forward troops of the Romanian 1st Army. However, the Romanians evacuated the city on the following day. The Romanians were plainly apprehensive that, in order to keep Nagyszeben under occupation, they would have to extend their bridgehead-like formation beyond capacity. With neither side actually occupying Nagyszeben, an Austro-Hungarian service battalion proceeded to evacuate government property from the city throughout the following week, unhindered by either side. This battalion, comprising 300 Landsturm, was commanded by Major Reiner. The evacuation was completed on 10 September. Also on 10 September, the Romanian 1st Army captured Sellenberk (Șelimbăr/Schellenberg), two miles southeast of Nagyszeben. This marked the end of the Romanian advance in the area for the ensuing fortnight. Sellenberk became the center of the main Romanian position north of the Turnu Roșu Pass.
