= Battle of Sellenberk (1916) =

- Part of the Battle of Transylvania of the Romanian Campaign of World War I
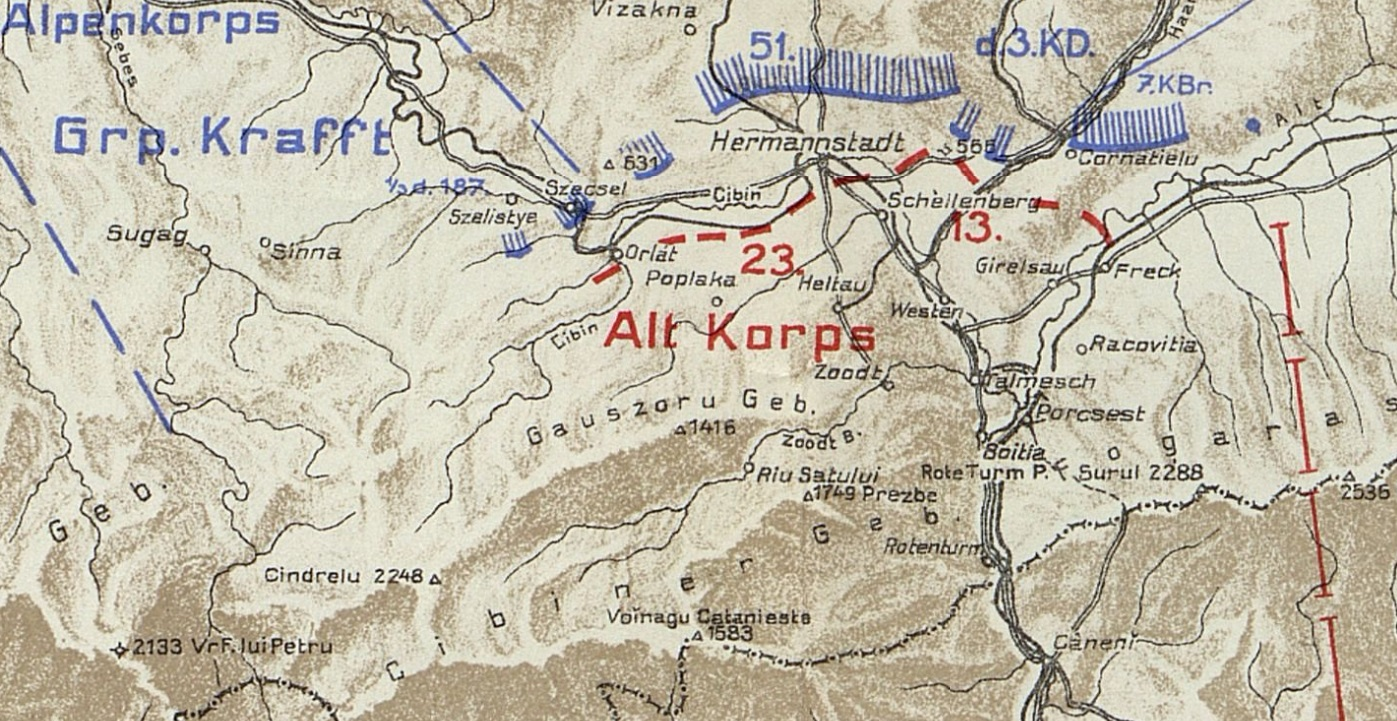
- The Romanian front north of the Red Tower Pass in mid-September, after the capture of Sellenberk
Date	7 and 10 September 1916
Location	Sellenberk, Transylvania, Austria-Hungary (today Șelimbăr, Sibiu County, Romania)
Result	Romanian victory

Belligerents
Romania	Austria-Hungary; German Empire

Commanders and leaders
(Kingdom of Romania) Ioan Culcer (Kingdom of Romania) Constantin Manolescu	(German Empire) Hermann von Staabs (10 September) (Austria-Hungary) Arthur Arz von Straussenburg (7 September) (Austria-Hungary) Béla Tanárky

Units involved
1st Army: Olt-Lotru Group (2 divisions)	1st Army/XXXIX Reserve Corps: 51st Honvéd Division

Casualties and losses
Unknown	Unknown

The Battle of Sellenberk was a World War I military engagement fought between Romanian forces on one side and Central Powers forces (Austria-Hungary and Germany) on the other side. It was part of the wider Battle of Transylvania and resulted in a Romanian victory.

== Background ==
On 27 August 1916, Romania declared war on Austria-Hungary and proceeded to invade the Hungarian region of Transylvania. The Romanian campaign plan called for the Olt-Lotru Group of the Romanian 1st Army under the command of General Ioan Culcer to secure the basin between Nagytalmács (Tălmaciu/Talmesch) and Nagyszeben (Sibiu/Hermannstadt). The area between Nagyszeben and the northern exit of the Turnu Roșu Pass was the designated assembly area for the 1st Army's Olt-Lotru Group. Opposing the Romanian invasion of Transylvania was the Austro-Hungarian 1st Army under the command of General Arthur Arz von Straussenburg. Nagyszeben (Sibiu/Hermannstadt) was occupied on 2 September by advanced troops of the Romanian 1st Army. However, the Romanians evacuated the city on the following day. Erich Ludendorff referred to this in his memoirs, stating that, after taking Brassó (Brașov/Kronstadt) on 29 August, "Rumanian patrols were soon seen in Hermannstadt.". The Romanians were plainly apprehensive that, in order to keep Nagyszeben under occupation, they would have to extend their bridgehead-like formation beyond capacity.

The Romanian forces in the region consisted of the 1st Army's Olt-Lotru Group (2 divisions), which was placed by General Culcer under the command of General Constantin Manolescu. Opposing the Romanians was the 51st Honvéd Division (commanded by General Béla Tanárky) of the Austro-Hungarian 1st Army.

== Battle ==
The battle for Sellenberk (Șelimbăr/Schellenberg) started on 7 September. However, on 8 September, following the German-Bulgarian victory at the Battle of Turtucaia in Southern Dobruja, the Romanian High Command ordered a halt to the Transylvania offensive. Also on 8 September, the XXXIX Corps of German General Hermann von Staabs assumed responsibility for operations in southern Transylvania. One of the units placed under the command of von Staabs was the 51st Honvéd Division. The battle was resumed on 10 September. That same day, the Romanian 1st Army entered Sellenberk.

== Aftermath ==
On 10 September, the Romanian 1st Army captured Sellenberk (Șelimbăr/Schellenberg), two miles southeast of Nagyszeben. This marked the end of the Romanian advance in the area for the ensuing fortnight. Sellenberk — where Michael the Brave had defeated the Hungarians in 1599 — became the center of the main Romanian position north of the Turnu Roșu Pass.
