= Battle of Mezőlivádia =

- Part of the Battle of Transylvania of the Romanian Campaign of World War I
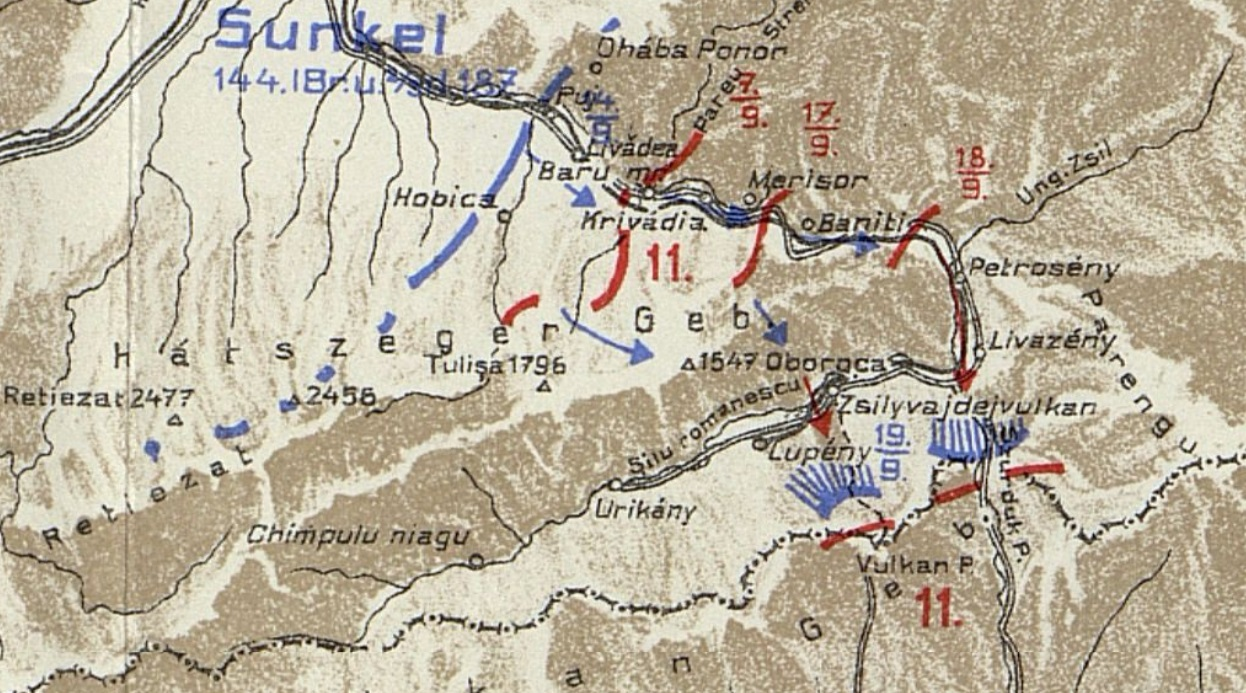
- Mezőlivádia (Livadia) visible between the Romanian (red) and Central Powers (blue) lines
Date	8 – 12 September 1916
Location	Mezőlivádia and the surrounding area, Transylvania, Austria-Hungary (today Livadia, Hunedoara County, Romania)
Result	Romanian victory

Belligerents
Romania	Austria-Hungary; German Empire

Commanders and leaders
(Kingdom of Romania) Ioan Culcer (Kingdom of Romania) Ioan Muică	(German Empire) Hermann von Staabs (German Empire) Edwin Sunkel (Austria-Hungary) Ludwig Berger

Units involved
1st Army: 11th Division	XXXIX Reserve Corps: 187th Division; 187th Regiment; 144th Austro-Hungarian Infantry Brigade

Casualties and losses
Unknown	Unknown total 305 prisoners 2 guns Several machine guns

The Battle of Mezőlivádia was a military engagement fought between Romanian and Central Powers (German and Austro-Hungarian) forces during the Romanian Campaign of the First World War. It was part of the Battle of Transylvania. This battle is notable for being the first Central Powers counterattack against the Romanian invasion of Transylvania, as well as the first military engagement during the Battle of Transylvania to involve German forces. The battle resulted in a Romanian victory.

== Background ==
Romania declared war on Austria-Hungary in the late evening of 27 August 1916. On 29 August, the Jiu Covering Force of the I Corps of the Romanian 1st Army, under the command of General Ioan Culcer, occupied the crucial Transylvanian coal-mining center at Petrozsény (Petroșani). The Romanians easily swept aside the weak resistance offered by the Hungarian coal-miner battalions, inflicting heavy casualties. The Romanians subsequently pushed west towards Hátszeg (Hațeg), stopping 15 mi (24 km) from that city. On 5 September, the first German unit to arrive in Transylvania — the lead regiment of the 187th Division, also numbered the 187th — unloaded at Marosillye (Ilia). The 187th Division was led by Major General Edwin Sunkel. The 187th Regiment, with the exception of its III Battalion, was moved to Mezőlivádia on 8 September, to reinforce the Austro-Hungarian 144th Infantry Brigade (Colonel Ludwig Berger). Also on 8 September, the German XXXIX Reserve Corps (General Hermann von Staabs) assumed responsibility for the operations in the southern region of Transylvania.

Meantime, the Romanian forces in the area had been severely reduced. At the beginning of September, the Romanian units in the area comprised the bulk of General Culcer's 1st Army: the 2nd, 11th and 12th Divisions. However, following the Romanian defeat in the Dobruja, the 2nd and 12th divisions were transferred to the south. The transfer of Culcer's two divisions started before 9 September. On the 9th, Major Radu R. Rosetti from the Romanian headquarters stated to General Andrei Zayonchkovski — the Russian commander in Dobruja — that the 2nd and 12th Divisions "were coming from Transylvania". The remaining 11th Division in the Petrozsény sector was commanded by General Ioan Muică.

== Battle ==
The area around Petrozsény was the first location of any military or commercial value to fall into Romanian hands. This region contained valuable coal mines, whose output was vital for the Hungarian railway system. Thus, it was also the scene of the first Central Powers counterattack, on 8 September. Despite the arrival of German reinforcements — all of the 187th Regiment of the 187th Division, minus the regiment's III Battalion — the Austro-Hungarian commander "inexplicably" ordered a retreat. Thus, the Romanians had little difficulty repulsing this first Central Powers counterattack against their invasion of Austro-Hungarian Transylvania. The Germans and Austro-Hungarians subsequently returned in good order to Puj (Pui), where they remained unhindered for several days. The Romanians, following up on their success, gained further ground, along with 305 prisoners, 2 guns and some machine guns. By 12 September, Romanian outposts advanced as far as Puj. According to post-war Austrian military maps, the Central Powers front on 14 September ran just outside Puj, immediately to the northwest of the village. By 12 September, three-fourths of the distance between the Transylvanian border and the vital junction of Hátszeg (Hațeg) had been covered by the Romanians.

== Aftermath ==
Von Staabs reacted promptly to the Austrian withdrawal. He sent to Puj another regiment (the 189th), the artillery of the 187th Division and a Bavarian light infantry regiment, the first unit of the Alpenkorps to arrive in Transylvania. The Central Powers forces under Edwin Sunkel thus renewed their offensive on 14 September, starting the Battle of Nagybár.
