= Surduc Pass =

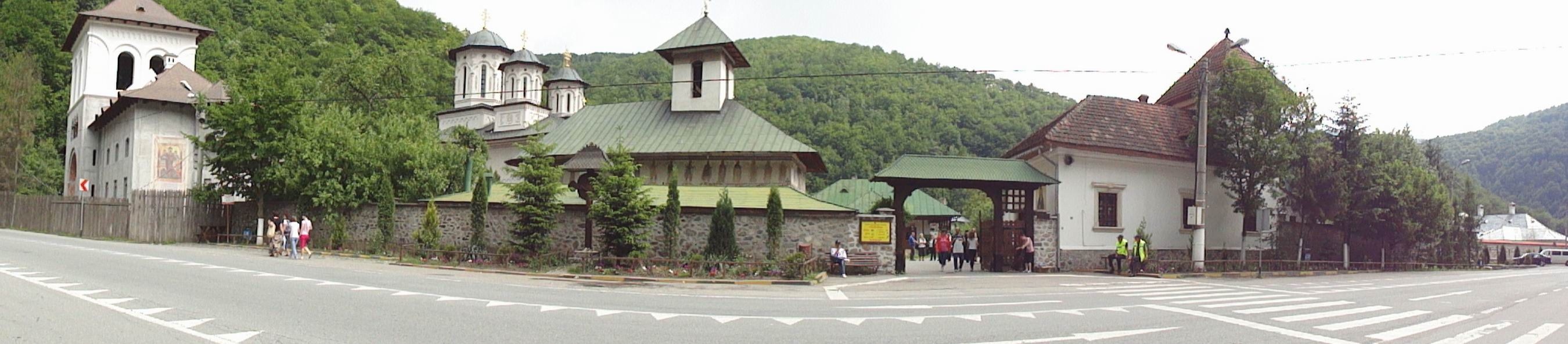
- Lainici Monastery, near the Surduc Pass
- Interactive map of Surduc Pass
- Traversed by: DN66/E79

Third Approach
- Location: Romania
- Range: Vâlcan Mountains, Parâng Mountains
- Coordinates: 45.2713°N 23.3753°E

The Surduc Pass (in Romanian: Defileul Jiului or Pasul Surduc, in Hungarian Szurdok-szoros) is a mountain pass in the Gorj and Hunedoara counties of Southwestern Romania, connecting the Petroșani Depression with Oltenia.

In Surduc Pass, the Jiu River divides two mountain ranges that belong to the Southern Carpathians: the Vâlcan Mountains to the west and the Parâng Mountains to the east.

In 1947, a road (national road DN66, part of the E-road E79) and a railway line were opened that connect Transylvania with Wallachia (the two other passes in the region are in the Timiș-Cerna Gap and the Turnu Roșu Pass). In August 2005, a national park with an area of 110 km^{2} (42 sq mi) was created in this pass.

The Romanian name of the pass derives from the Hungarian word "szurdok", which means "defile" or "canyon".
