= Petrozsény Offensive =

Component of World War 1

- Part of the Battle of Transylvania of the Romanian Campaign of World War I
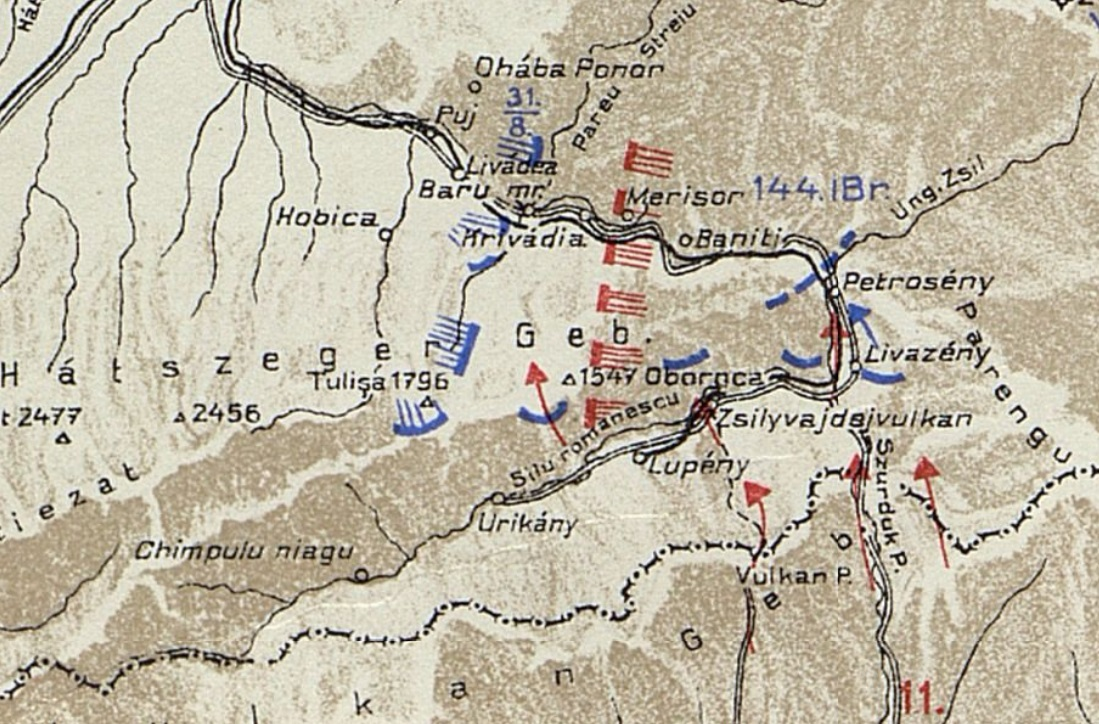
| Date | 27 August – 3 September 1916 |
| Location | Petrozsény District of Hunyad County, Transylvania, Austria-Hungary (today the surrounding areas of Petroșani, Romania) |
| Result | Romanian victory |

Belligerents
| Romania | Austria-Hungary |

Commanders and leaders
| (Kingdom of Romania) Ioan Culcer (Kingdom of Romania) Ioan Muică | (Austria-Hungary) Arthur Arz von Straussenburg (Austria-Hungary) Ludwig Berger |

Units involved
| 1st Army: 11th Division | 1st Army: 144th Infantry Brigade |

Casualties and losses
| Unknown | Unknown, but heavy |

The Petrozsény Offensive was the opening action of the south-western front of the 1916 Battle of Transylvania, during World War I. The Transylvanian coal-mining center of Petrozsény (Petroșani) was occupied by the Romanian Army on 29 August, two days after the Kingdom of Romania declared war on Austria-Hungary.

== Background ==
Romania declared war on Austria-Hungary on 27 August 1916. The central column of General Ioan Culcer's Romanian 1st Army advanced into a region of valuable coal mines, whose output was crucial to the Hungarian railway system. The Romanian advance was opposed by the Austro-Hungarian 1st Army, under General Arthur Arz von Straußenburg.

== Romanian offensive ==
The Romanian forces occupied Petrozsény on 29 August. The Jiu Covering Force, consisting of the 21st Infantry Brigade of the 11th Division, crossed the border at the Vulkán and Szurdok passes and occupied the vital Transylvanian coal-mining center at Petrozsény on 29 August. The weak resistance put up by the Hungarian coal-miner battalions was easily swept aside by the Romanian units, who inflicted heavy casualties. The rest of the 11th Division (General Ioan Muică) subsequently crossed the mountains and joined the covering forces. It then pushed further west, stopping 15 miles from Hátszeg (Hațeg). Although this halt complied with the instructions received by Culcer, it allowed the Austro-Hungarians time to regroup and would have great repercussions later. By 3 September, this group of General Culcer's Romanian 1st Army occupied the important coal area between Hobicaurikány (Uricani) and Petrozsény, driving back the ineffective Landsturm and miners battalions of the 144th Infantry Brigade over the saddle of Merisor. On 29 August, fighting also took place against the 144th Brigade at Zsilyvajdejvulkán (Vulcan), with further fighting taking place at Mount Oboroca on the 30th. The commander of the 144th Brigade was Colonel Ludwig Berger.

== Aftermath ==
Due to its valuable coalmines, the area occupied by the center of General Culcer's 1st Army was the first location of any military or commercial value to fall into Romanian hands. As such, this was also the scene of the first Central Powers counterattack against the Romanian invasion of Transylvania, on 8 September. However, the Romanian troops had little difficulty repulsing this attack.
