= 187th Infantry Division (German Empire) =

- Allegiance: German Empire
- Branch: Imperial German Army
- Engagements: World War I

The 187th Infantry Division (187. Infanterie-Division) was a formation of the Imperial German Army in World War I.
