= Ioan Popovici (divisional general) =

Divisional General Ioan Popovici
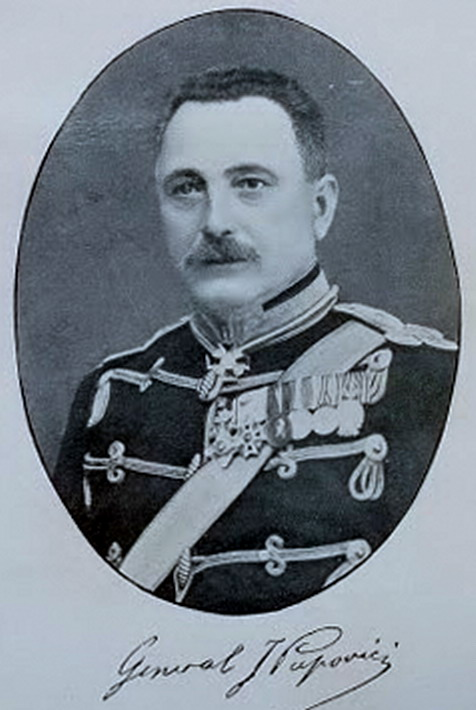
- Born: 16 August 1857; Galați, Moldavia
- Died: 6 August 1956 (aged 98); Bucharest, Romanian People's Republic
- Military career
- Allegiance: Kingdom of Romania
- Branch: Cavalry
- Service years: 1879–1916
- Rank: Second lieutenant (1881); Lieutenant (1886); Captain (1892); Major (1896); Lieutenant colonel (1902); Colonel (1907); Brigadier general (1912); Divisional general (1916)
- Nickname: "Provincialul" ("The Provincial")
- Commands: Commander of I Army Corps (Romania) (15 August 1916 – 17 September 1916)
- Conflicts: Second Balkan War; World War I; First Battle of Petroșani; Battle of Sibiu

Ioan Popovici (16 August 1857 – 6 August 1956) was a Romanian general and commander of the Romanian 1st Army Corps from 1916 to 1918 during World War I.

Born in Galați, he attended the Școala Militară de Infanterie și Cavalerie (Military Infantry and Cavalry School) in Bucharest from 1879 to 1881. Afterward he rose through the ranks until he became a divisional general in 1916 as World War I was raging, engulfing Romania. He was known as "Provincialul" ("The Provincial") because of his ineptitude.

In World War I, he took command on 3 September 1916 of the First Army Corps, which was subordinated to the First Army, under the command of Ioan Culcer. The 1st Corps comprised the 13th Division (under the command of Ioan Oprescu and after 10 September of Gheorghe Sănătescu), the 23rd Division (Matei Castriș), and the 1st Călărași Brigade (Oprescu). In September 1916, Popovici fought at the First Battle of Petroșani. The loss suffered by his command a few days later at the Battle of Sibiu led to his forced retirement.

He died in Bucharest in 1956, aged 98.

== Works ==
- Popovici, Ioan (1900). Organisarea armatei române, vol I. Schiță istorică a organisării de la 1830–1877 [Organization of the Romanian Army, vol. I. Historical sketch of the organization from 1830-1877] (in Romanian).

== Bibliography ==
- Falkenhayn, Erich von, Campania Armatei a 9-a împotriva românilor și a rușilor, Atelierele Grafice Socec & Co S.A., București, 1937
- Kirițescu, Constantin, Istoria războiului pentru întregirea României, Editura Științifică și Enciclopedică, București, 1989
- Ioanițiu, Alexandru (Lt. Col.), Războiul României: 1916–1918, vol 1, Tipografia Geniului, București, 1929
- România în războiul mondial 1916-1919, Documente, Anexe, Volumul 1, Monitorul Oficial și Imprimeriile Statului, București, 1934
- Marele Cartier General al Armatei României. Documente 1916–1920, Editura Machiavelli, București, 1996
- Istoria militară a poporului român, vol. V, Editura Militară, București, 1989
- România în anii primului Război Mondial, Editura Militară, București, 1987
- România în primul război mondial, Editura Militară, 1979
