= Hermann von Staabs =

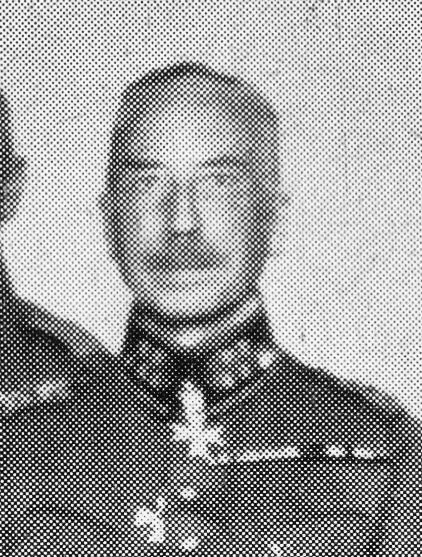
- Hermann von Staabs on the 10th anniversary of the Battle of Tannenberg
- Born: 11 March 1859; Aachen, Rhine Province, Kingdom of Prussia, German Confederation
- Died: 7 September 1940 (aged 81); Kassel, Gau Hesse-Nassau, German Reich
- Spouse(s): ∞ 1895 Elisabeth Emma Margarete Helene Bender; 4 children
- Military career
- Allegiance: German Empire
- Branch: Imperial German Army
- Service years: 1877–1919
- Rank: General of the Infantry
- Unit: Great General Staff
- Commands: Head of Railway Department; 37th Division; 3rd Division; XXXIX. Reserve Corps
- Conflicts: World War I
- Awards: Iron Cross; Red Eagle Order; Pour le Mérite with oak leaves

Friedrich Hermann Staabs, as of 1913 von Staabs (11 March 1859 – 7 September 1940), was a German infantry general in World War I and commanding general of the XXXIX. Reserve Corps.

== Biography ==
As a second lieutenant, Staabs was transferred from the cadet corps to the 62nd (3rd Upper Silesian) Infantry Regiment of the Imperial German Army on April 14, 1877. From October 1, 1879, to January 31, 1884, he served there as battalion adjutant and was then transferred to the 59th (4th Posen) Infantry Regiment. From October 1, 1885, Staabs attended the Prussian Staff College for three years.

He spent most of his military career on the Great General Staff. Here he rose to head of the railway department. In 1925 he published Aufmarsch nach zwei Fronten (Deployment on two fronts) a book in which he contradicted Moltke's view that it would not have been possible to quickly shift the focus of the German deployment to the Eastern Front.

On June 16, 1913, Staabs was raised to the hereditary Prussian nobility on the occasion of the 25th anniversary of the reign of Kaiser Wilhelm II. Even before the outbreak of World War I, Staabs was the commander of the 37th Division. In August 1914, was his division of the in East Prussia with the 8th Army on the Eastern Front. His troops fought as part of the XX. Army Corps under Friedrich von Scholtz in the Battle of Tannenberg and in the Battle of the Masurian Lakes. From June 15, 1915, to July 6, 1916, Staabs was the commander of the 3rd Division. His troops fought in the breakthrough Battle at Przasnysz in July 1915 and then pursued to the lower Narew. In September they advanced to Wolkowysk ago and went from 20 October between Naroch and Dryswjatysee for years of trench warfare until it was over. For his work he had received the swords of the Order of the Red Eagle, II. Class and the royal crown in August 1915.

On July 7, 1916, he succeeded Otto von Lauenstein as commander of the XXXIX. Reserve Corps. The corps was transferred to the Romanian theater of war after Romania declared war in August 1916. As part of the 9th Army under the command of Erich von Falkenhayn, his troops distinguished themselves especially in the Battle of Kronstadt in early October. Together with the I. Reserve Corps, he held out against the Romanians on the ridge of the Fagaras Mountains until the end of November. For participating in the occupation of Ploesti and taking Bucharest on December 6, 1916, he was awarded the Pour le Mérite on December 11, 1916.

On December 3, 1917, Staabs was appointed General of the Infantry. The corps was involved in the German spring offensive in 1918 as part of the 2nd Army. From March 17 to May 22, 1918, Staabs commanded both this corps and the XIII (Royal Württemberg) Corps. On May 15, 1918, he was also awarded the oak leaves for the Pour le Mérite for the services of his troops.

He was the father of Gerdhild von Staabs (1900–1970), the founder of the Scenotest.

== Bibliography ==
- Hans Friedrich Huebner: "Officer list of the 2nd Upper Rhine Infantry Regiment No. 99." E.S. Mittler & Sohn, Berlin 1906, p. 77.
- Falkenhayn, Erich von, 9th Army Campaign against Romanians and Russians, Atelierele Grafice Socec & Co S.A., Bucharest, 1937
- Kiritescu, Constantin, History of the war for the unification of Romania, Scientific and Encyclopedic Publishing House, Bucharest, 1989
- Ioanițiu Alexandru (Lt.-Colonel), Războiul României: 1916-1918, vol 1, Tipografia Geniului, București, 1929
- Romania in the World War 1916-1919, Documents, Annexes, Volume 1, Official Gazette and State Printing Offices, Bucharest, 1934
- The General Headquarters of the Romanian Army. Documents 1916 - 1920 , Machiavelli Publishing House, Bucharest, 1996
- Military history of the Romanian people, vol. V, Military Publishing House, Bucharest, 1989
- Romania in the years of the First World War, Militară Publishing House, Bucharest, 1987
