= Turnu Roșu Pass =

Turnu Roşu Pass
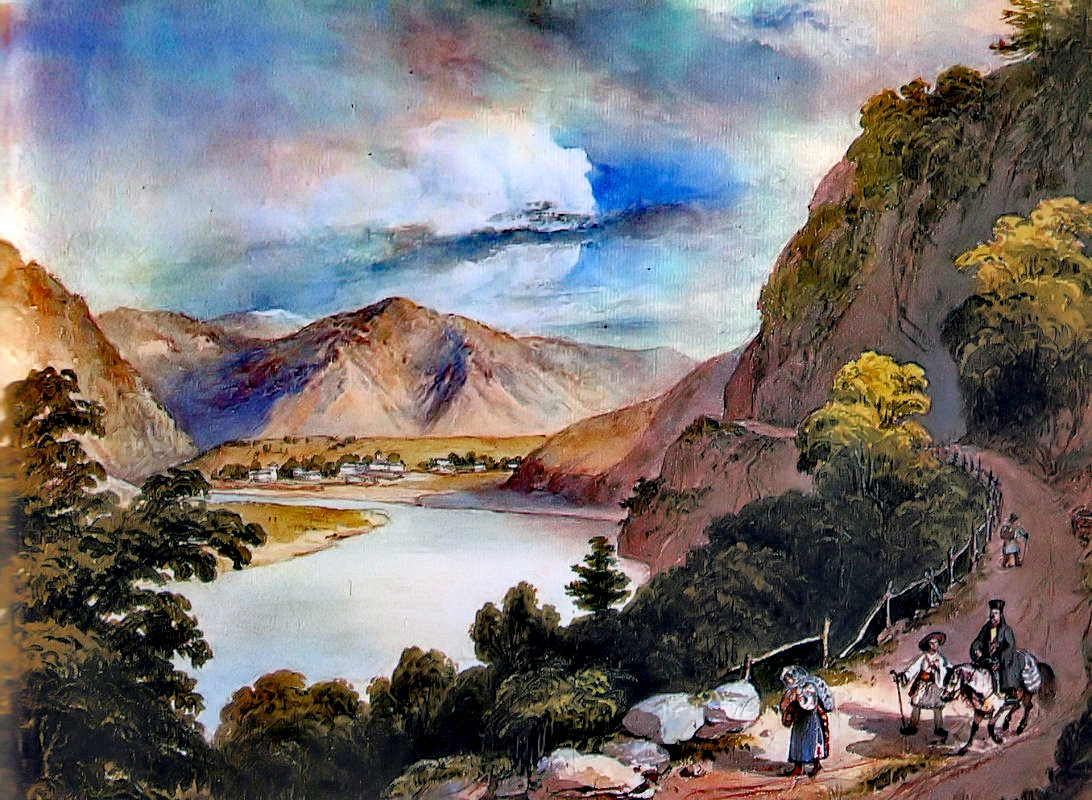

- Location within Romania
- Elevation: 352 metres (1,155 ft)

Third Approach
- Location: Romania
- Range: Southern Carpathians
- Coordinates: 45°32.55′N 24°16.17′E

Turnu Roșu Pass (Romanian: Pasul Turnu Roșu, Hungarian: Vöröstoronyi-szoros, German: Roter-Turm-Pass, Turkish: Kızılkule Geçidi, all of these names meaning Red Tower Pass in the respective languages) is a mountain pass in the Romanian Carpathians, connecting Vâlcea County (Wallachia) and Sibiu County (Transylvania). It is formed by the Olt River flowing southwards from Transylvania to Wallachia through the Southern Carpathians.
