= Battle of the Olt Valley =

World War I battle

- Part of the Romanian Campaign of World War I
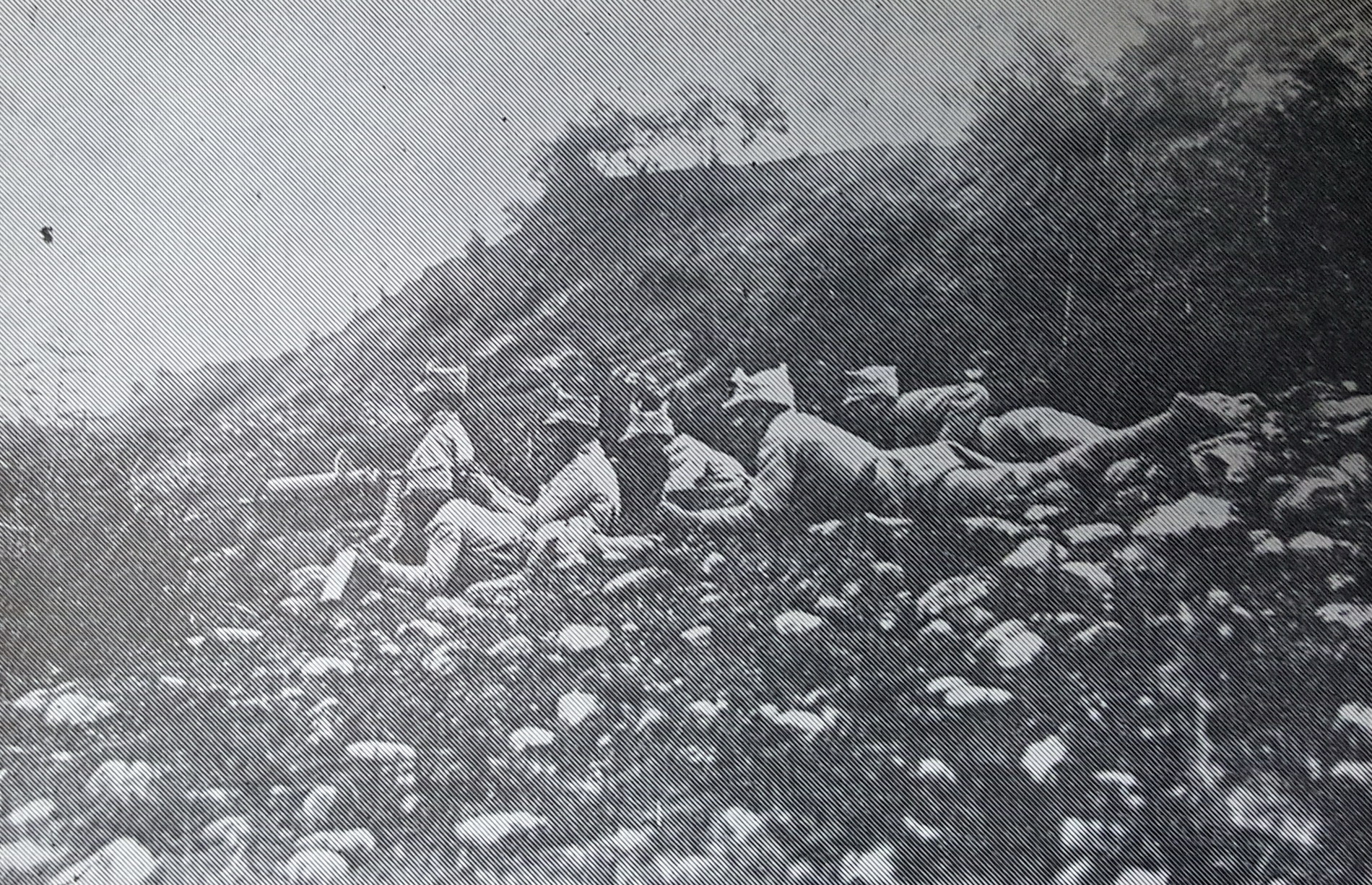
- Romanian machine gun nest at the Olt Valley
Date	28 October – 27 November 1916
Location	Olt Valley, Kingdom of Romania
Result	Central Powers victory

Belligerents
Romania	Austria-Hungary; German Empire

Commanders and leaders
(Kingdom of Romania) Paraschiv Vasilescu (Kingdom of Romania) Nicolae Petala	(German Empire) Konrad Krafft von Dellmensingen (German Empire) Heinrich of Bavaria †

Units involved
1st Army: 7th Division; 13th Division; 14th Division; 23rd Division	Krafft Corps: Alpine Corps Division; 216th German Infantry Division; 73rd Austro-Hungarian Division; 2nd Austro-Hungarian Mountain Brigade; 10th Austro-Hungarian Mountain Brigade

Casualties and losses
Unknown total Zănoaga: 700 casualties 3 machine guns captured First two weeks of November: 7,080 prisoners 12 guns captured 20 machine guns captured	Unknown total Poiana Spinului: Prince Heinrich of Bavaria killed

The Battle of the Olt Valley consisted in a prolonged military engagement during World War I between Romanian forces on one side and Central Powers' forces (Germany and Austria-Hungary) on the other side. Within just under a month, the Central Powers had managed to conquer the 30 miles (48 km)-long Olt Valley from its Romanian defenders.

== Background ==
From the Turnu Roșu Pass (Rotherthurm Pass) the Olt River flows for around 30 miles (48 kilometres) in a narrow gorge, which has its southern end at Râmnicu Vâlcea. An initial Central Powers attack in the region was defeated by the Romanian Army at Sălătrucu, causing a one week-long pause in operations. The Central Powers renewed their offensive at the end of October. Initially, the Central Powers forces in the region consisted in a mixed division with mostly German leadership, but mainly Austro-Hungarian troops. After being defeated at Sălătrucu, this force was strengthened. The Central Powers forces in the region were under the command of General Konrad Krafft von Dellmensingen. Romanian forces in the region consisted in elements of the 1st Army. Commanded by General Nicolae Petala starting with 25 October, the 1st Army was placed under the command of General Paraschiv Vasilescu by early November. Vasilescu became the fourth general to command the 1st Army in two weeks.

== Overall course of operations ==
Krafft's forces consisted of one Alpine Corps division, the 73rd Austro-Hungarian Division and 2nd and 10th Austro-Hungarian Mountain Brigades. On 7 November, the 216th German Infantry Division joined this group. Opposed to this force was the I Corps of the Romanian 1st Army, consisting in the 13th and 23rd Divisions. The Alpine Corps found the going slow. The Romanian troops fought tenaciously, taking advantage of the positions they had constructed along the border before the war to slow the German progress. Troubling for Krafft was his men's tendency to rely on artillery and feel pleased with seizing one enemy position per day. In an admonition to all the forces under his command, the frustrated Krafft acknowledged that the Romanian positions were challenging, but reminded his troops that they were not fighting against French fortifications on the Western Front, urging his commanders to rely less on long artillery bombardments and more on swift infantry assaults. Moreover, the Central Powers encountered nightmarish logistical problems regarding their supplies. Although the Alpine Corps' rate of advance remained sluggish, during the first two weeks of November Krafft's units captured 80 officers and 7,000 soldiers, 12 artillery pieces and 20 machine guns. On 10 November, the Romanians dispatched the 14th Division to the region as reinforcements. Subsequently, the 13th and 23rd Divisions were merged. The struggle finally ended on 25 November, when Krafft stated that the enemy resistance in front of his corps was broken.

== Individual engagements ==
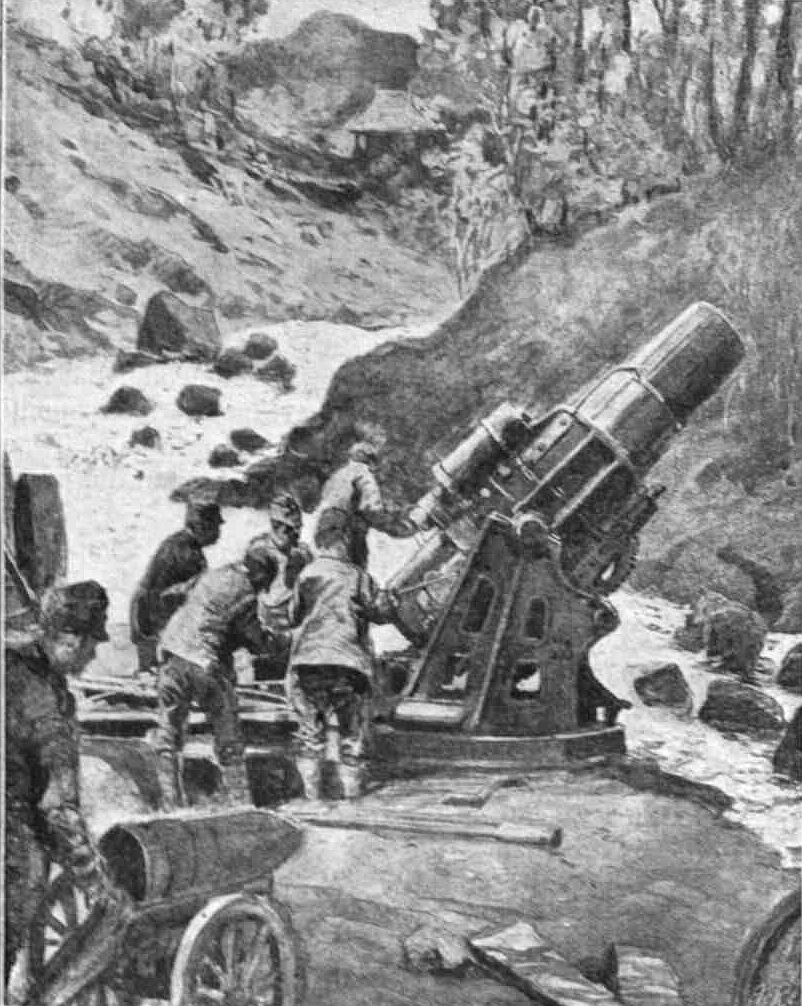
Austrian 305 mm mortar at Titești

=== Zănoaga ===
On 28 October, a fresh German division took Mount Mormonta, enabling the Bavarian Guard Regiment to take Zănoaga. The Romanians had incurred over 700 combat casualties, including 15 officers and 400 soldiers captured, as well as 3 machine guns. By 1 November, the Germans had reached Titești Valley.

=== Poiana Spinului ===
On 7 November, near Poiana Spinului, Romanian rifle fire claimed the life of Prince Heinrich of Bavaria, the leader of the III Battalion of the Guard Regiment, who was conducting a personal reconnaissance of the front line. His final words were: "Noblesse oblige. I do not mean that with respect to my family but rather my duty as an officer.".

=== Perișani ===
At Perișani, hand-to-hand combat yielded only 2 prisoners, as the rest of the Romanians fought to the end.

=== Cozia ===
Having taken Titești on 1 November, the Germans had conquered the heights on both sides of the Topologu (Mounts Fruntu and Mugele), as well as the Cozia Massif at the mouth of the Lotru. These were conquered between 6 and 9 November. The Romanians promptly counterattacked and, by 11 November, had reconquered Mount Fruntu, but it proved impossible to exploit this initial success. While the Central Powers had received reinforcements exceeding a division, the Romanians had a considerable force shifted to another sector of the front. Thus weakened, the Romanian forces had to give ground.

=== Sălătrucu ===
The Bavarian Light Infantry Brigade retook Sălătrucu on 12 November. By 15 November, the German front on the western side of the Olt Valley ran just south of the village of Galotreni, and on the eastern side of the valley the front ran through the southern end of the Cozia Massif and just south of Sălătrucu, with a notable salient to the south coming from the direction of Sălătrucu itself.

=== Râmnicu Vâlcea and Curtea de Argeș ===
The Romanian 7th Division arrived in the area around 20 November and brought the Germans to a halt. By 21 November, the German front ran just south of the village of Dăești, with a wide salient of little depth to the immediate east of the village. This would not last, however. On 25 November, Krafft stated that the enemy resistance in front of his corps was broken. On that very day, Râmnicu Vâlcea was finally taken. This was the southern end of the Olt Valley. The Central Powers forces in the sector had finally broken through the mountains. On 27 November, the line of the Olt River was abandoned by the Romanians, and on that same day, Krafft's forces took Curtea de Argeș.
