= Second Battle of the Jiu Valley =

1916 WWI battle in Romania

- Part of the Romanian Debacle of World War I
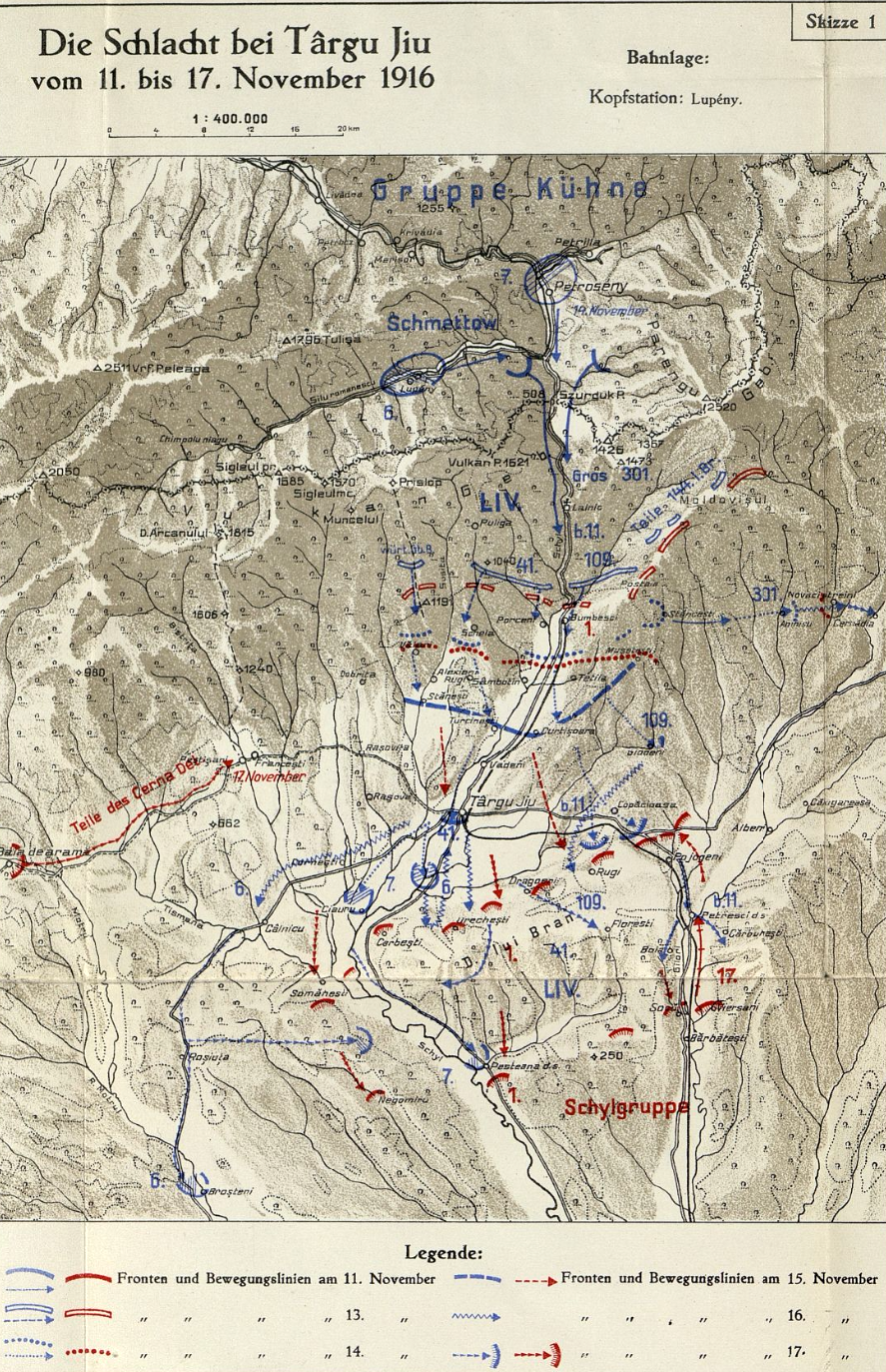
| Date | 7–17 November 1916 |
| Location | Jiu Valley, Romania |
| Result | German victory |

Belligerents
| Romania | German Empire; Austria-Hungary |

Commanders and leaders
| (Kingdom of Romania) Paraschiv Vasilescu | (German Empire) Viktor Kühne |

Units involved
| 1st Infantry Division | LIV Army Corps |

Strength
| 18 battalions | 40 infantry battalions 2 cavalry divisions |

Casualties and losses
| Unknown | Unknown Erwin Rommel's Company (according to Rommel himself): 3 dead (including 1 officer); 18 wounded 1 heavy machine-gun destroyed |

The Second Battle of the Jiu Valley was a military engagement between German and Romanian forces during the Romanian Campaign of World War I. It lasted between 7 and 17 November 1916 and resulted in a German victory.

The Germans outnumbered the Romanians by more than two to one resulting in a decisive German victory.

== Background ==
The Kingdom of Romania joined the Triple Entente in August 1916, following the signing of the Treaty of Bucharest. It declared war on Austria-Hungary on 27 August, launching an invasion of Transylvania. However, the Romanian offensive was repulsed by a German-led Central Powers counter-offensive, which succeeded in part due to a second front being opened in the region of Dobruja by a mostly-Bulgarian Central Powers force. By October, Romania was firmly locked in a two-front war. A mostly-German force, represented primarily by the 11th Bavarian Infantry Division, launched an invasion of Oltenia on 23 October, resulting in the First Battle of the Jiu Valley. An Austro-Hungarian brigade supported the Germans. The attempt however failed, as the Romanians stopped the Germans and rolled back most of their gains in a counterattack which lasted from 27 October to 1 November. Although the mountain passes remained in their hands, a decisive breakthrough had eluded the Germans. They had incurred losses amounting to over 1,500 killed, over 1,600 captured, 14 machine guns captured, and two howitzer batteries along with 8 other guns captured. On the Romanian side, General Ion Dragalina – the architect of the successful Romanian counterattack – was wounded in action and died on 9 November. The command on the Jiu sector passed to General Paraschiv Vasilescu.

Despite the German setback in the region, Erich von Falkenhayn decided to launch the breakthrough operation across the mountains in the same area. Falkenhayn's initial plan was to apply pressure at several points across the Carpathians, but this had not succeeded. Changing his approach, he decided to force the Romanian front in the Jiu Valley, the Western end of the Romanian line. He reasoned that out of all of the Carpathian passes, this was the one where the Germans could make best use of their superiority in firepower. The valleys elsewhere were too narrow, resulting in German defeats during attempts to make progress throughout October (see the battles of Predeal, Dragoslavele and Sălătrucu). In preparation of the breakthrough, the Central Powers forces in the region were reinforced by cavalry, 41st Prussian and 109th Prussian infantry divisions, and the Württemberg Mountain Battalion. Supporting the Germans was a Hungarian Honved brigade. The defeated Bavarian 11th Division was held in reserve. The infantry forces were designated LIV Corps and placed under the command of General Viktor Kühne. The LIV Corps totaled 40 infantry battalions (not counting strong cavalry support), greatly outnumbering the opposing Romanians (18 battalions). German Cavalry in the region consisted in a corps composed of the 6th and 7th cavalry divisions. Before the start of their offensive, the Germans had improved the roads and paths across the mountains. The Romanian 1st Infantry Division was the main Romanian formation in the Jiu Valley. Although a second division was assigned as reinforcements, it had yet to arrive in the area of operations. The existing Romanian forces in the region were even weaker than they had been during the first German attack, in late October.

== Battle ==
=== Retaking lost ground (7–14 November) ===
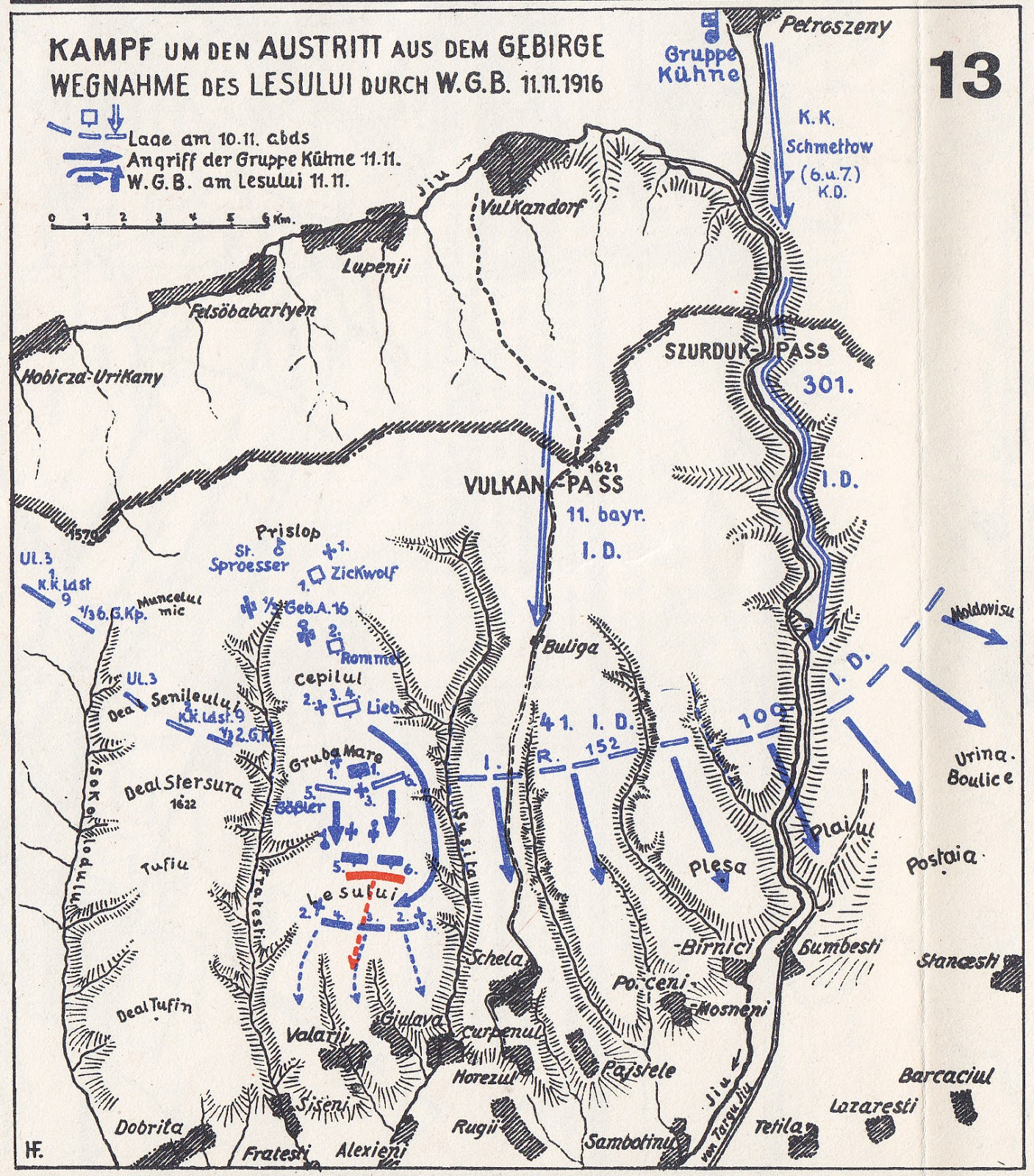
Fighting for Gruba Mare and Leșului hills on 11 November 1916

On 7 November, the Württemberg Mountain Battalion took the Romanian position at Gruba Mare. The Romanians tried hard to retake the summit on the next day, but – with the support of Hungarian mountain artillery – they were repulsed. Among the German officers involved in this battle was Erwin Rommel, at that time serving as an Oberleutnant in command of a company within the Württemberg Mountain Battalion. One Romanian counterattack isolated the company's leading platoon and knocked out its machine gun. Although the platoon managed to regroup with the rest of Rommel's company, its heavy machine gun was abandoned, a loss which Rommel acknowledged: "We now missed the heavy machine-gun that lay smashed up ahead." Even after Rommel had secured a replacement machine-gun from a nearby outpost, the Romanians did not give up, eventually managing to catch Rommel's Company Headquarters in the firing line and shooting its leader, Feldwebel Dallinger, in the head. As the fog was dispersing, Rommel's company had its left flank completely exposed and was short of ammunition. Rommel telephoned Major Theodor Sproesser, reporting the situation and requesting urgent reinforcements. A few minutes later, a platoon of around 50 men under Lieutenant Hohl arrived, which Rommel deployed on his exposed left flank. There was no further cause for concern for Rommel's company.

On 10 November, the Germans launched their full-scale attack on a front with a length of 20 miles. One division attacked between the Vulcan and Surduc Passes, and a second division attacked east of Surduc. Smaller groups further to the west limited their advance through the mountains until the battle was decided by the main concentration of German forces, on the Jiu River. The Germans were thus careful not to repeat the mistakes of their ill-fated first offensive into the region. Only on the western end of the front, where there were hardly any Romanian troops, an Austro-Hungarian group pressed forward at a quick pace, aiming to outflank the Romanian positions around Târgu Jiu. On 10 November, three mountains on both sides of the Jiu and a massif 9 miles (14 kilometres) to the east were occupied by the Germans. The Germans continued their advance on the next day with fair success, reaching the exit of the Surduc Pass by daybreak on the 11th, where they were temporarily halted north of Bumbești. At 7 am, after the fog had dissipated, the heavy German 210 mm howitzers started firing at the Romanian fortifications, some of which had armored cupolas. The Romanian fortifications – obsolete as they were – held the Germans in place for the following two days. On 13 November, after German 210 mm howitzers shattered the armored cupolas, the Germans captured the Romanian fortifications. By the night of the 13th, the Germans were astride the Jiu Valley, on a front extending from Vălari past Sâmbotin to Bârcaciu. The Germans had thus gotten to within 6 miles (9.7 kilometres) north of the town of Târgu Jiu.

On 14 November, Bumbești was taken by the Germans. Up to this point, the Germans had taken practically no new ground. While they were indeed advancing, they were merely retaking land which they had acquired during the early stages of their October offensive (23 to 27 October) and subsequently lost to the Romanian counteroffensive (27 October to 1 November). On 27 October, the Germans had reached Bumbești and were poised to enter Târgu Jiu, but were halted at the Jiu Bridge just west of the town and subsequently driven back.

=== Capture of Târgu Jiu (15 November) ===
The Germans started to properly gain new ground on 15 November, when they captured the town of Târgu Jiu, the capital of Gorj County. The Germans advanced slowly, so as to avoid a flanking blow similar to the one that had ruined their October offensive. The town was taken by General Eberhard Graf von Schmettow's cavalry. That same day, a snowstorm took place.

=== Closing operations (15–17 November) ===
The Romanian front in western Wallachia had been left without any reserves. Reinforcements coming from the east, despite moving in forced marches, failed to arrive before the end of the battle. The Romanians fought a delaying action, but on 17 November their defense crumbled under superior numbers and a far superior weight of guns. The last Romanian defenses in the region had thus been broken.

== Aftermath ==
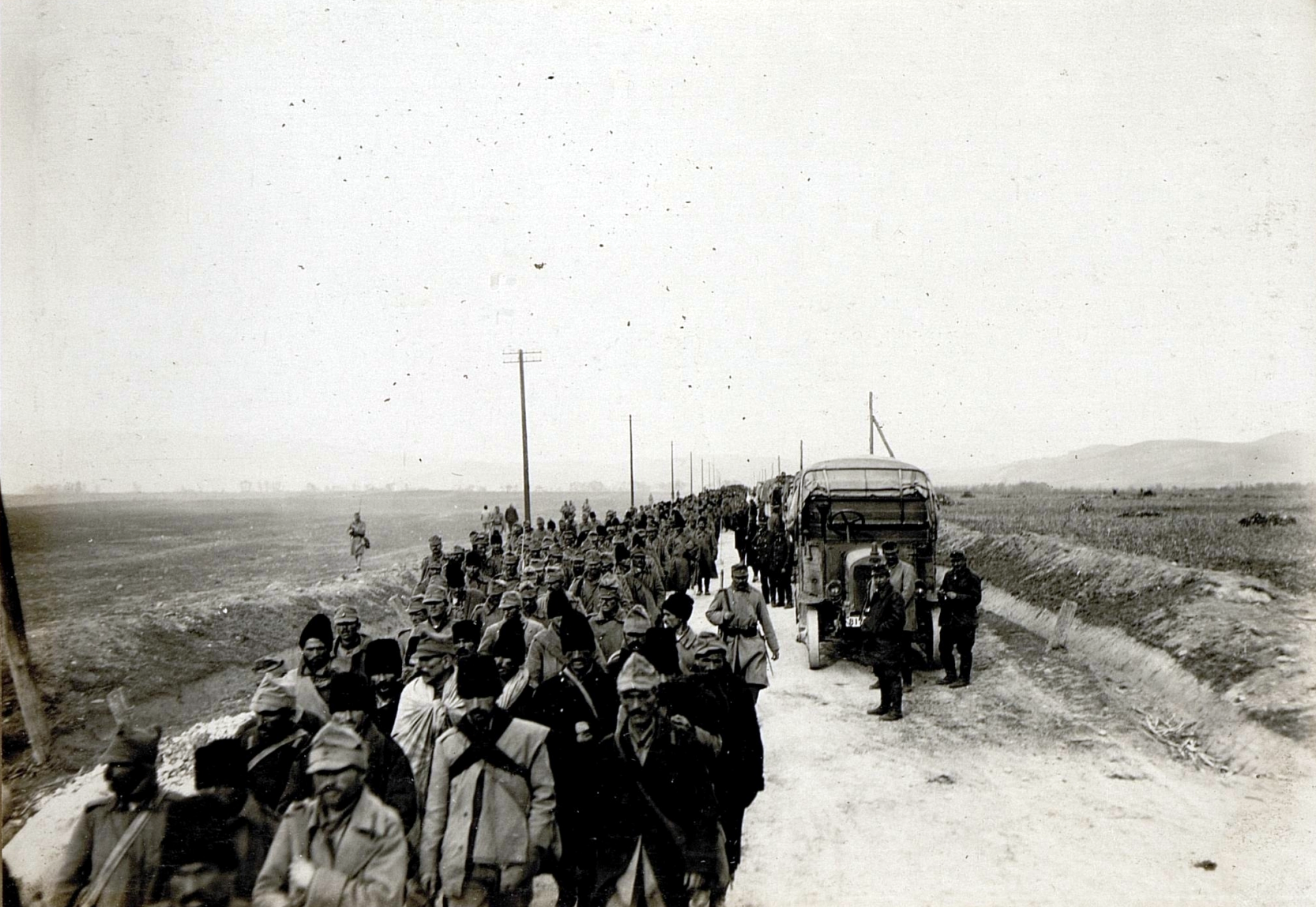
Romanian prisoners of war marching towards Petrozsény (November 1916)

Map of Romania (1913), with its counties

The Germans seized Târgu Jiu on 15 November. All of the Jiu Valley was in German possession by 17 November. Craiova, the largest city in Oltenia, was taken on 21 November, and the Olt River itself was crossed on 23 November. It is worth noting that, on 13 November, the Germans were 6 miles from Târgu Jiu. It took them two days to cover this distance, and seize the town itself on the 15th. The Germans advanced slowly, so as to avoid a flanking blow similar to the one that had ruined their October offensive. The town was taken by General Eberhard Graf von Schmettow's cavalry.

The reason Falkenhayn chose the Jiu Valley for a breakthrough was rather logistical than strategical. The consequences of the German breakthrough in that region during mid-November, serious as they were for the Romanians, proved less disastrous than those which would have followed upon an early breakthrough at the Törcsvár/Bran and Predeal passes. In order for Falkenhyan to win a complete victory at the earliest possible moment, it was necessary to force the passes in the center of the Carpathian arc. Namely, the passes between Bran and Buzău. If that had been achieved and the railway between Buzău and Ploiești seized, Romania would have been split in two, with Wallachia separated from Moldavia. The Romanian 1st Army and much of the 2nd Army would have been cut off. Thus, while the Romanian line ultimately caved in at the Jiu Valley, the Romanians ultimately averted the worst possible results.

Târgu Jiu — capital of Gorj County — became the fourth county capital on native Romanian soil to be taken by the Central Powers, after the loss of Bazargic, Silistra and Constanța in Dobruja. Within a fortnight after taking Târgu Jiu on 15 November, the Germans captured most of the Romanian county capitals west of Bucharest, including Craiova on 21 November (capital of Dolj County), Caracal on 23 November (capital of Romanați County), Râmnicu Vâlcea on 25 November (capital of Vâlcea County), Slatina on 27 November (capital of Olt County) and finally — on 29 November — Câmpulung and Pitești (capitals of Muscel and Argeș counties, respectively).

== German planning controversy ==
There is considerable disagreement between the German and Allied versions of the lead-up to the German breakthrough at the Jiu Valley. The Russian General Staff stated on 22 November that the German plan against Romania had completely failed, that Falkenhayn had failed at Predeal, and that he could only overrun Wallachia, instead of cutting it off in a pincer movement. The German semi-official comment, however, claimed that it had never been the intention of their Supreme Command to break through in the southeastern Carpathian passes, trying to make out – in reaction to their defeats in the passes south of Brassó (Brașov) and on the Moldavian frontier – that these had always been part of a maneuver which aimed at attracting and binding Romanian forces in an area away from the Jiu Valley, the place singled out for the main attack. The truth was probably that the German Supreme Command acted on a plan which, if successful, would have achieved an overwhelming victory, but even if only partially carried out, would have given them the means to achieve remarkable though less overwhelming successes. With the eastern Carpathian passes eliminated, the southern route from Brassó (Brașov) to Bucharest and the Danube offered the greatest potential for crushing the Romanian Army. Both the German and Austro-Hungarian commands favored this approach. However, the Romanians expected their enemies to choose that route, and accordingly they had constructed formidable defenses in the passes south of the city before the war started. Taking into consideration the worsening weather and the situation of the railways, Erich von Falkenhayn decided to achieve his breakout in the westernmost mountain passes. That being said, Falkenhayn had not entirely given up hope of breaking through the Romanian defenses south of Brassó (Brașov). He sent his divisions east and south of the city to both keep pressure on the Romanians and — with luck — break through the Romanian defenses. General Curt von Morgen, one of Falknehayn's subordinates, argued that much more of the Romanian Army could have been captured if a breakthrough would have been achieved at Câmpulung instead of the Jiu Valley. He insisted that this would have achieved "a real victory, a Cannae, a Tannenberg". Falkenhayn planned to apply pressure at several different points across the mountains and then exploit a success wherever it was achieved.
