= The Romanian Debacle =

Series of World War I battles in Romania

- Part of the Romanian Campaign of World War I
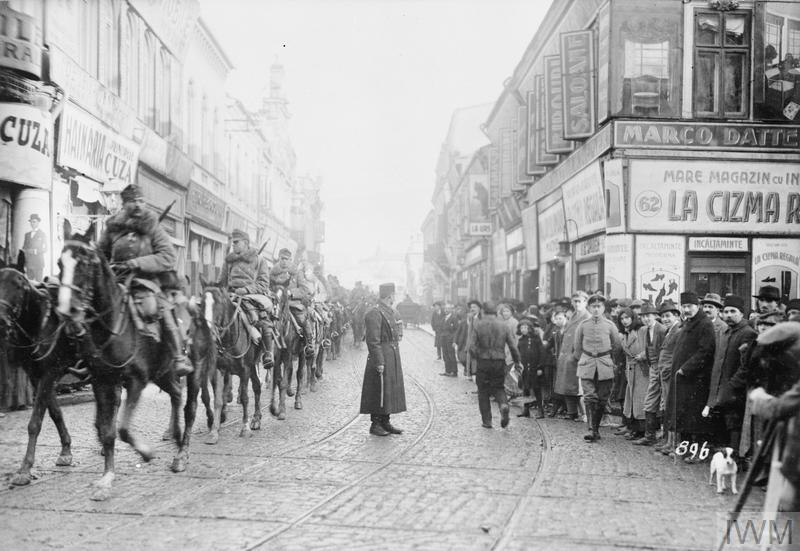
- Austro-Hungarian cavalry entering Bucharest on 6 December 1916
Date	15 November – 7 December 1916
Location	Wallachia, Romania
Result	Central Powers victory

Belligerents
Romania; Russia (December)	Germany; Bulgaria; Ottoman Empire; Austria-Hungary

Commanders and leaders
(Kingdom of Romania) Constantin Prezan	(German Empire) August von Mackensen (German Empire) Erich von Falkenhayn

Units involved
Army Group Prezan: 1st Army	Danube Army; 9th Army

Casualties and losses
Unknown	Unknown

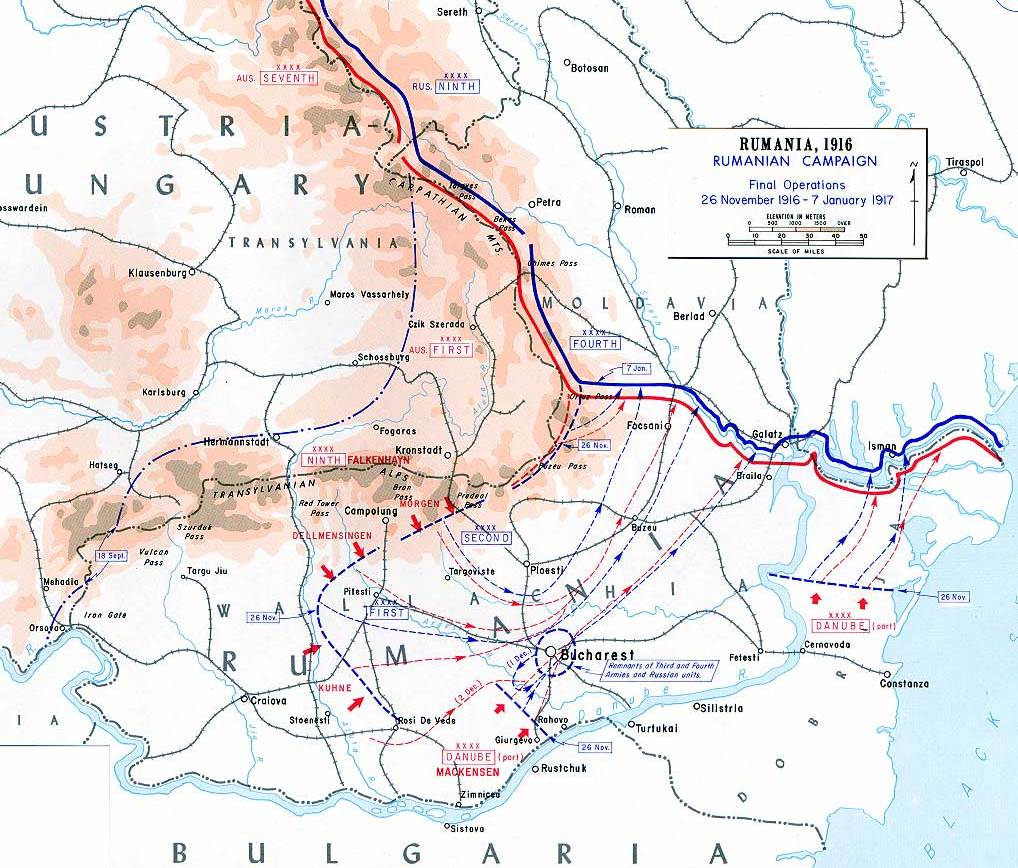
Operations in Romania, November 1916 to January 1917

The Romanian Debacle consisted in a series of battles between November and December 1916 which led to the conquest of Bucharest, the capital of Romania, by the Central Powers. Russian forces joined the Romanians at the start of December.

== Background ==
Romania joined the war on 27 August 1916, launching an invasion of Transylvania. When this failed due to a German-led Central Powers counterattack, the Romanians subsequently succeeded in defeating the attempts made by the Central Powers to pressure every mountain pass and exploit a success wherever it was achieved. Changing his strategy, German General Erich von Falkenhayn selected a single mountain pass — along the Jiu Valley — for a breakthrough. He chose that particular place on logistical grounds, as the valleys elsewhere were too narrow for the Germans to make best use of their superiority in firepower.

== Central Powers offensive ==
=== Second Battle of the Jiu Valley (11–17 November) ===
Besides their advantage in firepower, the Germans had also amassed a force which outnumbered the Romanians in the Jiu Valley more than 2 to 1 (40 infantry battalions supported by Cavalry against 18 Romanian battalions). Despite their great superiority, it still took the Germans almost one week (11–17 November) to break through the mountains. On 14 November, Bumbești was taken by the Germans. Up to this point, the Germans had taken practically no new ground. While they were indeed advancing, they were merely retaking land which they had acquired during the early stages of their October offensive (23 to 27 October) and subsequently lost to the Romanian counteroffensive (27 October to 1 November). On 27 October, the Germans had reached Bumbești and were poised to enter Târgu Jiu, but were halted at the Jiu Bridge just west of the town and subsequently driven back. The Germans started to properly gain new ground on 15 November, when they captured the town of Târgu Jiu, the capital of Gorj County. The Germans advanced slowly, so as to avoid a flanking blow similar to the one that had ruined their October offensive. The town was taken by General Eberhard Graf von Schmettow's cavalry. That same day, a snowstorm took place.

=== German advance towards Craiova (18–22 November) ===
On 19 November, Filiași was taken, followed by Craiova on the 21st.

=== Crossing the Danube (23–25 November) ===
At 7 am on 23 November, in thick fog, Austro-Hungarian combat engineers landed a light infantry battalion from the 217th Division on the northern bank of the Danube. A few Romanian rifle shots were heard. Another battalion was then landed. Romanian artillery fire had little effect due to the fog. As the fog lifted, more boats of all sizes and shapes, protected by the Austro-Hungarian monitors, joined the landing. By midday, the entire 217th Division was safely deployed in Romania. The badly outnumbered Romanians, two militia companies, fled north. By the end of the day, a total of 17 battalions had been ferried across the river. The Austro-Hungarian engineers began assembling the bridge. On the 24th, Bulgarian infantry was also ferried across the Danube. On that same day, the first serious Romanian counterattack against the bridgehead took place. German artillery easily dispersed the attacking infantry. That night, the bridge was finished. The artillery was taken across the bridge on the 25th, followed by the Turkish 26th Division. On that same day, Alexandria was reached and secured by the Germans. When August von Mackensen advised the German Supreme Command of his progress, Paul von Hindenburg named him the commander of all forces within Romania and designated the units that had crossed from Bulgaria the "Danube Army". Falkenhayn's 9th Army was subordinated to Mackensen's overall command.

=== Battle of Slatina (23–27 November) ===
Taking place between 23 and 27 November, this battle was the only real Romanian victory during the debacle. On 23 November, after the Romanian 1st Army received its new commanders – General Constantin Prezan and his talented operations officer, Captain Ion Antonescu – the Romanians managed to halt three German infantry divisions west of the Olt River, as they attempted to converge on Slatina. However, German Cavalry had crossed the southern Olt on that same day, turning the Romanian left flank, while more German troops were coming from the north, threatening the Romanian right flank. In these conditions, the Romanians had to abandon the Olt line on 27 November, but not before blowing up Slatina's granaries and its railway bridge. Despite making "terrific efforts", it was only on that same day (27 November) that the Germans had finally crossed the Olt at Slatina. The Romanians had achieved a strategic success, blocking the German forces which were supposed to join the left flank of Mackensen's Danube Army from reaching their objective in meaningful time. On 30 November, just before the heavy Romanian attack on Mackensen's exposed left flank, the Germans that the Romanians had halted at Slatina for days were still 50 miles away.

=== Retreat from Orsova (25 November – 7 December) ===
The Romanian division occupying the Hungarian town of Orsova (now Orșova, Romania), under Colonel Anastasiu, started retreating on 25 November, leaving the town behind. The retreating Romanians kept close to the river. Although they were surrounded from all sides, they fought bravely and did not lay down their arms until reaching the Olt in early December. On 7 December, after reaching the Olt only to find its banks under enemy control, they finally surrendered at Caracal.

== Battle of Bucharest (28 November – 6 December) ==
On 27 November, the German 9th Army and Mackensen's Danube Army had linked up. The Central Powers could now advance on converging axes towards Bucharest. Two days prior, on 25 November, Mackensen became the overall commander of all Central Powers forces in Romania, Falkenhayn's 9th Army being subordinated to Mackensen's command. Also on 27 November, the Romanians abandoned the line of the Olt. On 22 November, General Constantin Prezan assumed command of a new southern army group. On 27 November, Giurgiu was taken by the Bulgarians.

=== Prelude (28–30 November) ===
On 28 November, the German 217th Division was halted at Prunaru, despite the Romanians incurring casualties amounting to 700 prisoners and 20 guns. Although the 217th moved some battalions to Naipu, these were checked by Prezan's maneuver group within two days. The left flank of the Danube Army had thus been exposed. On 29 November, the towns of Pitești and Câmpulung fell to the Germans, after the Romanian 1st Army made a brief stand at Pitești.

=== Battle of the Argeș (1–3 December) ===
On 1 December, Prezan struck heavily against the exposed left flank of Mackensen's Danube Army, across the river Neajlov. German troops who had already crossed the river were cut off. The situation was "certainly very critical" for the Central Powers. A Turkish division was the only thing that stopped the Romanian encirclement. Unfortunately for the Romanians, their reserves came too late, and Prezan's attack could not be pressed home, while the Central Powers were reinforced. The success of 1 December was changed on the 2nd and 3rd to disaster, and Prezan's broken forces were driven in upon Bucharest.

=== Closing operations (4–6 December) ===
On 4 December, the Kaiser ordered the ringing of church bells in all Germany in honor of the victory. On that same day, a German counterattack was skillfully evaded by the Romanians. A Russian thrust southeast of Bucharest on 5 December was of no importance. That same day, the Arsenal in Bucharest was blown up. On 6 December, the Germans took Bucharest, Câmpina and Ploiești.

== Aftermath ==
The fall of Bucharest was followed by a fighting-retreat towards Moldavia. Henceforth, the Romanian forces would be fully integrated with the Russians. After hard fighting, Buzău was taken from its Russo-Romanian defenders on 15 December. After another violent battle, Mackensen's Danube Army took Brăila on 4 January 1917. On 8 January, 9th Army captured Focșani. By Ludendorff's own admission, it had proved impossible to annihilate the Romanian Army. Forced to leave forces in occupied Romania, Ludendorff also admitted that – in spite of the German-led victory against the Romanian Army – the German position at the end of the campaign was definitely weaker regarding the conduct of the war as a whole.

Despite the overall success of the campaign, there was some discontent among the German leadership. Ludendorff disliked having to select the western end of the Romanian front for a breakthrough in the mountains, as strategic possibilities would thus be diminished. But this could not be helped, as the top priority by that time was to get across the mountains somehow. Conversely, the Russian General Staff made a positive appraisal of the situation, following the German breakthrough at the Jiu Valley in mid-November. The Russians held that the German plan against Romania had completely failed, that Falkenhayn had failed at Predeal and that he could only overrun Wallachia, instead of catching it in a pincer movement as originally intended. Post-war, historian John Buchan made a similarly positive appraisal: "Let justice be done to the skill and fortitude of the Rumanian retreat. Her generals were quick to grasp the elements of danger, and by their defence of the central passes prevented the swift and utter disaster of which her enemies dreamed."

== Cited sources ==
- Barrett, Michael B. (2013). Prelude to Blitzkrieg: The 1916 Austro-German Campaign in Romania. Indiana University Press. ISBN 978-0253008657.
- Buchan, J. (1922). A history of the great war. Vol. 3. New York Houghton Mifflin Company.
- Buttar, Prit (2016). Russia's Last Gasp: The Eastern Front 1916–17. Bloomsbury Publishing. ISBN 978-1472812766.
- Ludendorff, Erich (1919). Ludendorff's own story. Vol. 1. Harper & brothers. ISBN 9780836959567.
