= Henri Cihoski =

Romanian general

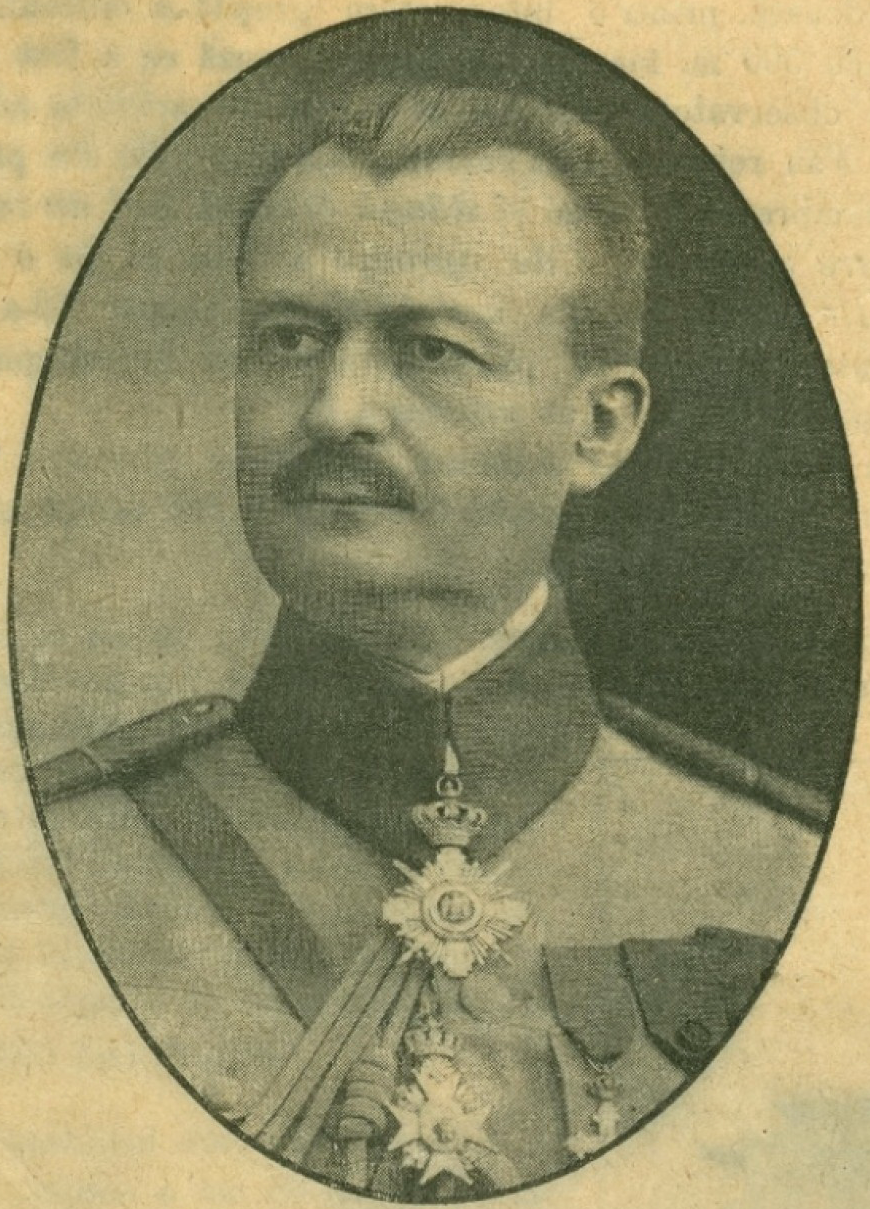
- Official portrait of Cihoski from 1918
- Born: October 2, 1871; Tecuci, Tecuci County, Principality of Romania
- Died: May 18, 1950 (aged 78); Sighet Prison, Romanian People's Republic
- Education: Higher War School
- Spouse: Sofia Ferhat (m. 1910)
- Children: 2
- Relatives: Stanislas Cihoski (brother)
- Military career
- Allegiance: Romanian Army
- Branch: Infantry
- Service years: 1891–1931
- Rank: Major general
- Conflicts: Second Balkan War; World War I; Romanian campaign; Battle of the Olt Valley; Battle of the Argeș; Battle of Mărășești; Hungarian–Romanian War
- Awards: Order of Michael the Brave, 3rd class Order of the Star of Romania, Officer class Order of the Crown (Romania), Commander class Legion of Honour, Officer class Order of St. George

48th Minister of War of Kingdom of Romania
- In office 10 November 1928 – 4 April 1930
- Prime Minister: Iuliu Maniu
- Preceded by: Paul Angelescu
- Succeeded by: Iuliu Maniu

Henri Cihoski (October 2, 1871 – May 18, 1950) was a Romanian major general during World War I, and Minister of War from 1928 to 1930.

== Biography ==
=== Early days ===
He was born on October 2, 1871, in Tecuci, the seat of Tecuci County, in a family of Polish origin. His mother was Eugenie, née Dobjansky, while his father was Alexandru Cihoski, an engineer who had fought as a cavalry officer in the Polish January Uprising of 1863 before emigrating to Romania. He had two sisters and two brothers, one of whom, Alexandru-Eugeniu, became a brigadier general, and the other, Stanislas, became a professor and rector at the Academy of Commercial Studies.

After attending elementary school in his native city, Henri Cihoski pursued his studies at the Gheorghe Roșca Codreanu High School in Bârlad and then at high schools in Bucharest and Iași. After graduation in 1889, he was admitted at the Officers School in Bucharest, from which he graduated in July 1891 with the rank of second lieutenant. He studied for two more years at the School of Artillery and Military Engineering and was promoted to lieutenant in January 1894, after which he moved to Focșani, where he worked on the fortifications of the Focșani–Nămoloasa–Galați line at the Focșani Gate. In 1895 he was admitted at the Higher War School, graduating in 1897 second in his class, which included the future generals Paraschiv Vasilescu, Alexandru Lupescu, Constantin Iancovescu, Mihail Schina, Constantin Scărișoreanu, and David Praporgescu. After being promoted to captain in 1899, he did in 1901 a ten-month internship in the Austro-Hungarian Army and participated, together with General Constantin Robescu, Colonel Alexandru Averescu, and Major Alexandru Exarcu at the exercises of the Austro-Hungarian Army in Croatia.

=== Military career ===
Promoted to major in 1908, Cihoski was assigned command of the 4th Pionieri Battalion, and in 1911 he was transferred back to the Focșani–Nămoloasa–Galați line. In April 1912 he advanced in rank to lieutenant colonel and was named Chief of Staff of the 4th Infantry Division. In early July 1913, at the start of the Second Balkan War, Cihoski and Colonel Constantin Cristescu were sent on a mission to Belgrade to coordinate with Serbia in the war against Bulgaria. In the next three years he was commanding officer of the 2nd Pionieri Battalion and of the 16th Suceava, 30th Muscel, and 5th Vâlcea Regiments, and commander of the Bucharest Fortress; he was promoted to colonel in October 1914.

=== World War I ===
In August 1916, when Romania entered World War I on the side of the Allies, Cihoski was at the headquarters of the Fifth Army Corps. Two months later, he took command of the 13th Infantry Division and fought at the Battle of the Olt Valley defending against the attacks of the German troops at the Turnu Roșu Pass and in the Topolog River valley. In late 1916 he fought at the Battle of the Argeș, and was wounded on 3 December in the battle to defend Bucharest. After being treated at hospitals in Galați and Iași, he returned to the front lines in February 1917, and took command of the 10th Infantry Division. In June 1917 he became a brigadier general, commanding the 10th Division which participated in heavy fighting at the Battle of Mărășești. He was decorated with the Order of Michael the Brave, 3rd class; the Order of St. George; and the Legion of Honour, Officer class.

After the war he was promoted to major general and in 1919 he served as Deputy Chief of General Staff during the Hungarian–Romanian War.

=== The interwar ===
In December 1920, two years after the Union of Transylvania with Romania, he was put in charge of reorganizing the army in Transylvania. The next year, he was tasked with supervising the coronation of King Ferdinand I of Romania and the construction of the Coronation Cathedral in Alba Iulia. He served as Minister of War in the First Maniu cabinet, from 10 November 1928 to 4 April 1930. On 5 March 1931 he resigned from the Army and was named lieutenant general in the Army Reserves the next day.

=== Last years ===
During World War II, he was a member of the Supreme Council of National Defense in 1943.

On 6 May 1950 Cihoski was arrested by the Communist authorities and sent to Sighet Prison, where he died twelve days later after being beaten during interrogation. In 1967, on the 50th anniversary of the Battle of Mărășești, a cenotaph in his honor was placed at the Mausoleum of Mărășești.

=== Personal life ===
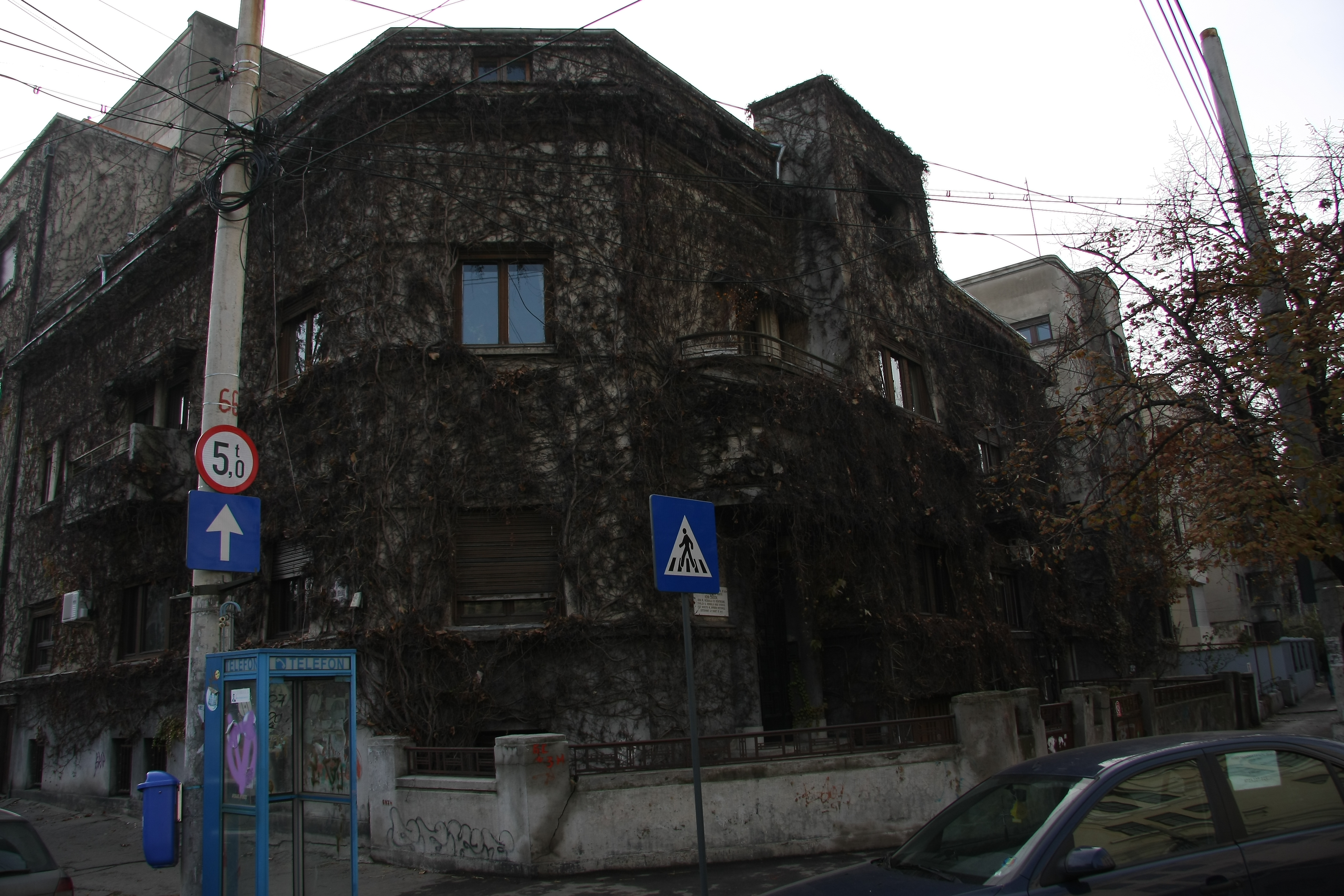
Henri Cihoski's house in Bucharest

In 1910 Cihoski married Sofia Ferhat, who was born in an Armenian family from Focșani; they had a daughter, Henriette, who became a sculptor, and a son, Alexandru. The family lived in a house built for him in 1934 by architect Alexandru Săvulescu; the house is located at the corner of Dacia Boulevard and Piața Spaniei in Bucharest. After Cihoski was arrested in May 1950, his family was evicted from their house and their belongings were confiscated; in September 1950, Sofia Ferhat appealed for redress to the Interior Minister, Teohari Georgescu.
