= Battle of Jiu Valley =

Battle of Jiu Valley might refer to:

- First Battle of the Jiu Valley
- Second Battle of the Jiu Valley
