= Paraschiv Vasilescu =

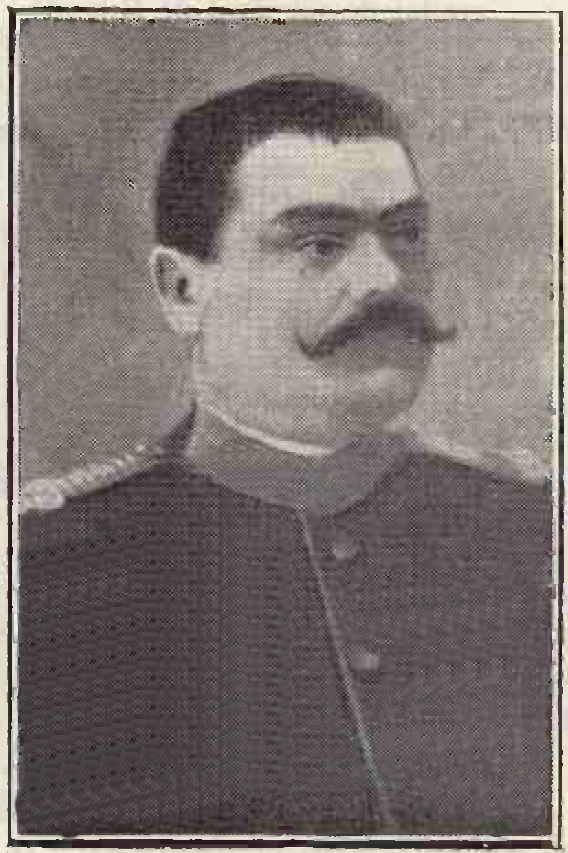
- Born: March 14, 1864
- Died: 1925 (aged 60–61); Bucharest, Kingdom of Romania
- Military career
- Allegiance: Romania
- Branch: Romanian Land Forces
- Service years: 1885—1918
- Rank: Major General
- Commands: 14th Infantry Division; 1st Army
- Conflicts: Second Balkan War; World War I; Battle of the Olt Valley; Second Battle of the Jiu Valley; Battle of the Southern Carpathians
- Awards: Order of the Crown (Romania), officer rank (1906); Order of the Star of Romania, officer rank (1912); Rise of the Country Medal (1914); Order of Michael the Brave, 3rd class (October 27, 1916)

Paraschiv Vasilescu (March 14, 1864 – 1925) was one of the generals of the Romanian Land Forces in the First World War. Between March 3, 1904, and April 1, 1905, Major Vasilescu was the commander of the Border Guard Corps. He served as a division commander in the 1916, 1917, and 1918 campaigns.

== Biography ==
After graduating in 1885 from the military school of officers with the rank of second lieutenant, Vasilescu held various positions in the infantry units or in the upper echelons of the army, the most important being those of commander of the 3rd Infantry Regiment and of the 4th Territorial Corps.

During World War I, he served as commander of the 14th Infantry Division between 27 August [O.S. 14 August] 1916 and 2 November [O.S. 20 October] 1916 and the 1st Army, between 3 November [O.S. 21 October] 1916 and 24 November [O.S. 11 November] 1916. From January 1917 he served as Deputy Chief of the General Headquarters.

He was decorated with the Order of Michael the Brave, class III, for the way he led the 14th Infantry Division in the battles of the 1916 campaign, being one of the first generals decorated with this order (the second decree for generals, together with General Eremia Grigorescu).

For the dexterity with which he led the troops under his command, opening the gorge from Toplița with a minimum of losses, giving excellent results.

— High Decree no. 3055 of October 27, 1916.

After the war, Vasilescu held a number of important positions in the army, such as commander of the Army Corps and Inspector General of the Army.

== Bibliography ==
- Kirițescu, Constantin, History of the war for the unification of Romania, Scientific and Encyclopedic Publishing House, Bucharest, 1989
- Ioanițiu, Alexandru (Lt.-Colonel), The Romanian War: 1916-1918, vol 1, Genius Printing House, Bucharest, 1929
- Romania in the World War 1916-1919, Documents, Annexes, Volume 1, Official Gazette and State Printing Offices, Bucharest, 1934
- The General Headquarters of the Romanian Army. Documents 1916 - 1920, Machiavelli Publishing House, Bucharest, 1996
- Military history of the Romanian people, vol. V, Military Publishing House, Bucharest, 1989
- Romania in the years of the First World War, Militară Publishing House, Bucharest, 1987
- "Romania in the First World War", Military Publishing House, 1979
