= Nicolae Petala =

Romanian general

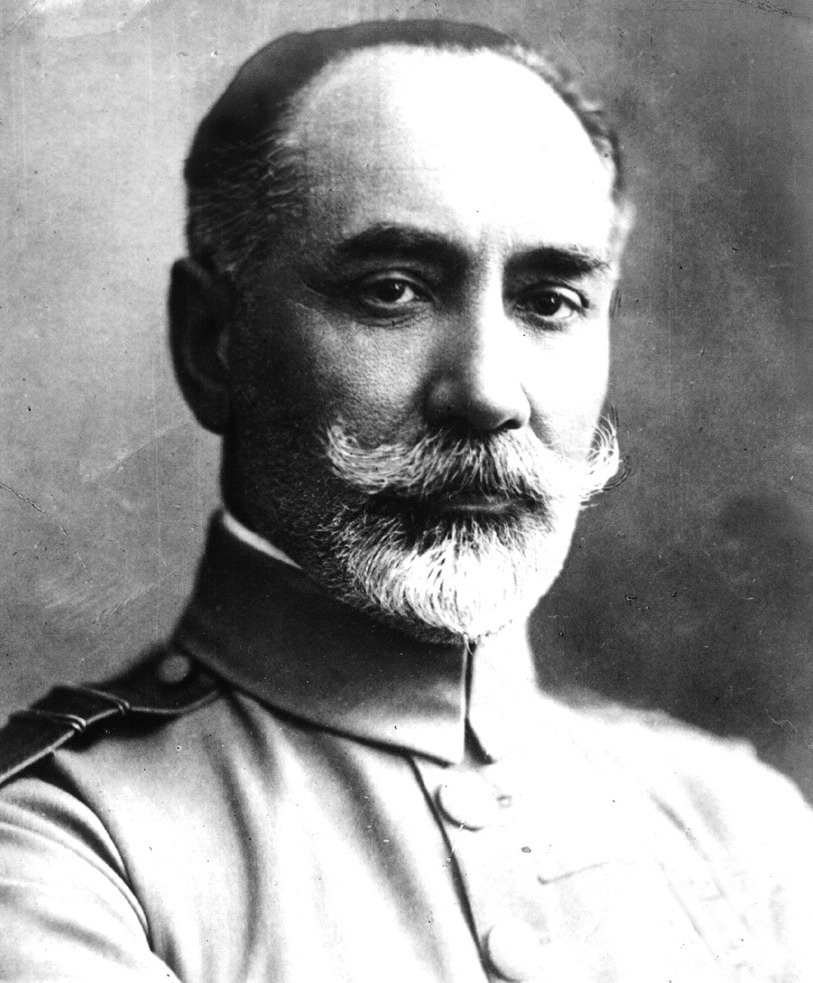
- Born: August 29, 1869; Vaslui, United Principalities
- Died: 1947 (aged 77–78); Bucharest, Romania
- Military career
- Allegiance: Romania
- Branch: Romanian Land Forces
- Service years: 1889–1925
- Rank: Major General
- Commands: 1st Army
- Conflicts: Second Balkan War; World War I; First Battle of the Jiu Valley; Battle of Sălătrucu; Battle of Dragoslavele; Battle of the Olt Valley
- Awards: Order of the Star of Romania, officer rank (1912); Order of the Crown, commander rank (1909) "The Rise of the Country" Medal (1913); The "Sanitary Merit" Cross (1914)

Nicolae Petala (29 August 1869 – 1947) was a Romanian general who was one of the generals of the Romanian Land Forces in the First World War. He served as commander of the 1st Army and several army corps and divisions in the campaigns of 1916, 1917, and 1918.

== Military career ==
He was born in Vaslui in 1869 and attended high school in Iași from 1881 to 1887. After graduating in 1889 from the Bucharest military school of officers with the rank of second lieutenant, Petala advanced in rank to lieutenant (1892), captain (1897), major (1906), lieutenant-colonel (1910), and colonel (1913). He held various positions in the artillery units or in the upper echelons of the army, the most important being those of commander of the 40th Infantry Regiment (1911–1912), chief of staff of the 2nd and 3rd Army Corps (1913–1915), and commander of the 15th Infantry Brigade (1915–1916). In 1913 he participated in the Second Balkan War.

In 1916, Petala advanced in rank to brigadier general. After Romania entered World War I on the side of the Allies in August 1916, he successively fulfilled the functions of: commander of the 15th Infantry Brigade (between 27 August and 7 September); commander of the 22nd Infantry Division (between 25 August and 12 September); commander of the 9th Infantry Division (between 30 August and 12 October); commander of the 1st Army Corps (12 October to 25 October); commander of the 1st Army (between 25 October and 3 November). Subsequently, he was commander of the 1st Army Corps (between 3 November 1916 and 3 June 1918) and commander of the 4th Army Corps (between 3 June 1918 and 12 July 1919). He was promoted to major general in 1918. In May 1919 he participated in the Romanian occupation of Pokuttia.

After the war, he headed the Command of the Western Troops from Cluj (between July 1 and September 30, 1920) and the 6th Army Corps from Cluj (between March 24, 1921 and April 1, 1924). In 1925 he was appointed Inspector General of the Army and Military Education. Between 1921 and 1928 he was the director of the newspaper Cultura Poporului. He was a legal senator. Petala was married to Rosetta Pilat and had 2 children from the marriage, Elena-Alice and Vintilă.

Petala died in Bucharest in 1947.

== Bibliography ==
- Constantin Kirițescu, History of the war for the unification of Romania, Scientific and Encyclopedic Publishing House, Bucharest, 1989.
- Alexandru Ioanițiu (Lt.-Colonel), The Romanian War: 1916-1918, vol 1, Tipografia Geniului, Bucharest, 1929.
  - Romania in the World War 1916-1919, Documents, Annexes, Volume 1, Official Gazette and State Printing Offices, Bucharest, 1934.
  - The General Headquarters of the Romanian Army. Documents 1916 - 1920, Machiavelli Publishing House, Bucharest, 1996.
  - The military history of the Romanian people, vol. V, Militară Publishing House, Bucharest, 1989.
  - Romania in the years of the First World War, Militară Publishing House, Bucharest, 1987.
  - Romania in the First World War, Militară Publishing House, 1979.
