= Battle of Sălătrucu =

- Part of the Battle of the Southern Carpathians of the Romanian Campaign of World War I
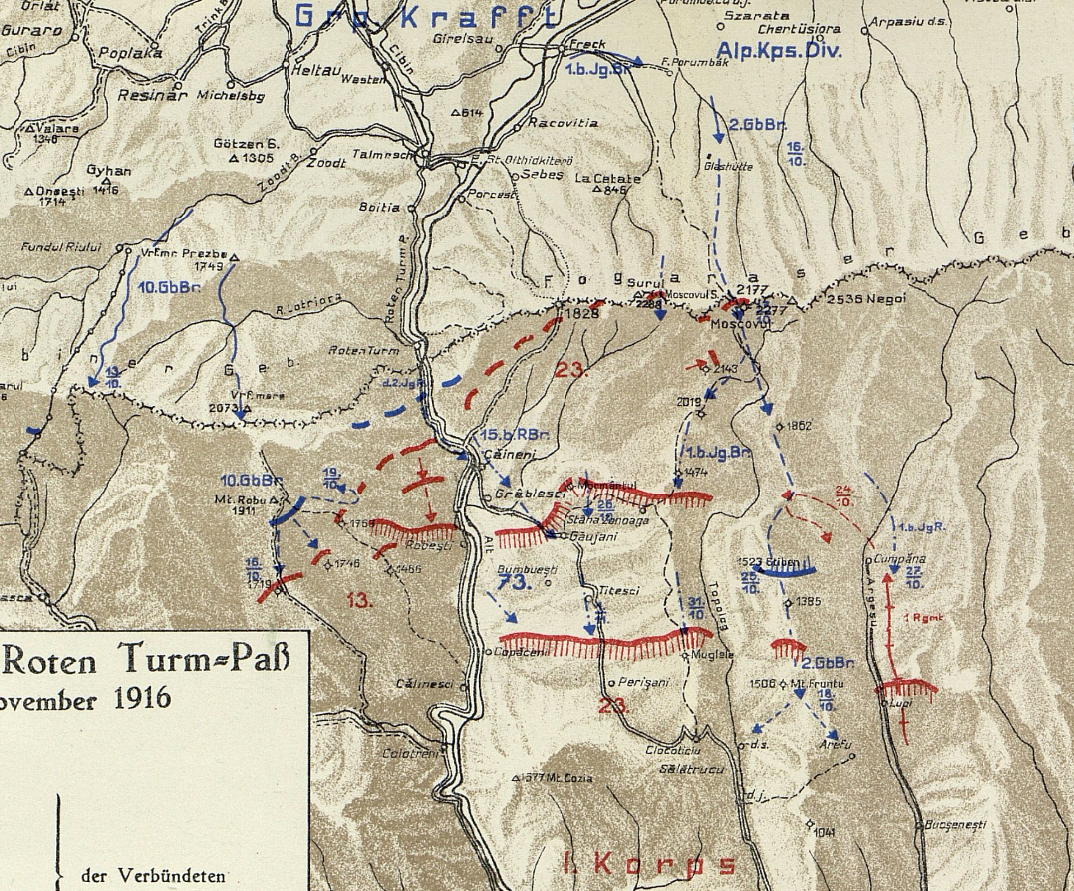
- Map of the area of operations (Sălătrucu lies south of the map)
| Date | 16–23 October 1916 |
| Location | Sălătrucu, Romania |
| Result | Romanian victory |

Belligerents
| Romania | Austria-Hungary; German Empire |

Commanders and leaders
| (Kingdom of Romania) Ioan Culcer (Kingdom of Romania) Nicolae Petala | (German Empire) Erich von Falkenhayn (German Empire) Konrad Krafft von Dellmensingen |

Units involved
| 1st Army: I Corps; 13th Division; 20th Divisions; 23rd Division | 9th Army: Krafft Group; Bavarian Guard Regiment; Bavarian Jäger Brigade; 2nd Austro-Hungarian Mountain Brigade; 10th Austro-Hungarian Mountain Brigade |

Strength
| 7,500 | Unknown |

Casualties and losses
| Unknown | Unknown |

The Battle of Sălătrucu was a military engagement during the Romanian Campaign of World War I. It took place after the Battle of Transylvania and resulted in a Romanian victory. A mixed Central Powers force – under German leadership but with mostly Austro-Hungarian troops – conducted a failed offensive into Romanian territory, south of the Turnu Roșu Pass.

== Background ==
At the onset of the Romanian Campaign, starting on 27 August 1916 with the Battle of Transylvania, the Romanian 1st Army (General Ioan Culcer) consisted of six divisions, of which four comprised the I Corps (General Ioan Popovici). In the middle of September, General Culcer moved the I Corps headquarters to Nagytalmács (Tălmaciu/Talmesch). General Popovici arrived in Nagytalmács along with his staff on 16 September. Popovici had two divisions under his command at Nagyszeben (Sibiu/Hermannstadt): the 13th and the 23rd. By October, Popovici's Corps had been driven back from Nagyszeben in disarray, but was subsequently reorganized and reinforced. On 27 September, during the Battle of Nagyszeben, the Romanian 20th Division joined Popovici's forces, attacking the Germans from the south. The 20th Division was commanded by General David Praporgescu. Following the end of the battle, Popovici was relieved and Praporgescu took over the command of the I Corps. His 20th Division remained a part of the Romanian 1st Army, joining the other two divisions of the I Corps. General Praporgescu infused new courage and energy into his subordinates. However, on 13 October, Praporgescu was killed by a stray shell on a visit to the front. He was succeeded at the command of the I Corps by General Nicolae Petala.

After the Battle of Nagyszeben in the last days of September, a group of units under the command of General Krafft von Dellmensingen was left by General Erich von Falkenhayn in front of the Red Tower Pass, to protect his right flank. This Central Powers force consisted of the Bavarian Guard Regiment and the Jäger Brigade in the center and two Austro-Hungarian mountain brigades on the flanks: the 2nd on the left flank and the 10th west of the Olt. This force amounted to "a scratch division with largely German leadership but mostly Austro-Hungarian troops". The opposing Romanian forces, three divisions strong, might on paper appear to have been in an overwhelming numerical superiority, but in actuality none of these divisions exceeded 2,500 men.

== Battle ==
The Central Powers began advancing in the region on 16 October, aiming to pin the Romanians in place in order to facilitate a breakthrough at the Jiu Valley. By 18 October, Krafft's eastern flank had reached the hills just to the north of Sălătrucu, where their advance was met by a Romanian counterattack on 19 October. The Central Powers retreated to Mount Fruntu, and from there, on 21 October, retreated further to Poiana Lunga. The Central Powers had attempted to outflank the defenses to the east of the Olt/Roter-Turm Pass, and succeeded in making good initial progress through the mountains before running into a determined Romanian counterattack north of Sălătrucu. The 2nd Brigade covered 40 miles in the first 30 hours. The Bavarian Jägers stormed the Moscovul Massif in thick fog, taking it in hand-to-hand fighting. The Bavarian Guard Regiment slowly advanced down the Red Tower Pass, inching forward with frontal assaults against strong Romanian resistance. The Romanians rapidly reversed most of the gains made by the Central Powers. General Petala showed great initiative, hauling guns up the mountains with wire-rail used by local foresters. If it weren't for a heavy snowstorm as well as considerable German reinforcements, the brigade which covered Krafft's eastern flank would have been entirely destroyed. The Romanians skillfully conducted a converging movement which almost cut off the Austro-Hungarian brigade. Krafft's western flank was also intercepted at the Pietroasa and Veverita Massifs on 16 October, and flung back with heavy losses towards Mounts Robu and Murgasu. The disasters to his flanks brought up by the Romanian counterattacks forced Krafft to hold up the attack of his Bavarian forces in the center. The offensive had come to an end by the 23rd. This first Central Powers offensive south of the Red Tower Pass was unsuccessful.

One of the Romanian officers who fought at Sălătrucu, in the Topolog Valley, was major Nicolae Rădescu (the future Prime Minister of Romania in the immediate aftermath of World War II). For his bravery and skill at the Battle of Sălătrucu, he was awarded on 10 January 1917 the Order of Michael the Brave, 3rd Class.

== Aftermath ==
The Romanian forces in the region were those defeated at Nagyszeben in September. Their conduct showed the particular strength which could be expected of Romanian troops, even in defeat.

A note of anxiety appeared at the 9th Army headquarters, although officers tried to reassure themselves that setbacks were temporary. One German account attributes part of the Romanian counterattack's success to German complacency. Fighting subsequently degenerated into a series of bloody attacks and counterattacks until exhaustion forced both sides to pause. For a week there was a respite, but at the close of October, on the 28th, the offensive was renewed.

Erich Ludendorff made the following appraisal of the events:

And just south of the Rotenturm Pass General Krafft von Dellemsningen, with his Alpine Corps, reinforced by two Austrian mountain brigades, and, after the battle of Hermannstadt, met with a very stubborn resistance in covering the flanks of the Ninth Army, which was pressing forward from Kronstadt. In order to attract the enemy to his front, and so relieve the burden of this army, he had adopted offense as the best means of defense. In spite of violent fighting, in which the Rumanians often counter-attacked, the Alpine Corps was able to gain but little ground south of the pass by the end of October. It was a case of true mountain warfare in the winter, in all its characteristic forms, with all its stupendous difficulties. The troops, including the Austrian mountain brigades, fought admirably, but it was a terribly slow business.
