= Alpenkorps (German Empire) =

Alpenkorps ("Alpine Corps")
- Active: 1914–1919
- Country: German Empire
- Branch: Army
- Type: Mountain infantry
- Size: Approx. 15,000
- Engagements: World War I: Serbian Campaign; Battle of Verdun; Romanian Campaign; Battle of Caporetto; Battle of the Lys; Hundred Days Offensive

Commanders
- Notable commanders: Konrad Krafft von Dellmensingen, Ludwig Ritter von Tutschek

The Alpenkorps was a provisional mountain formation of division size formed by the Imperial German Army during World War I. It was considered by the Allies to be one of the best in the German Army.

== Formation ==
After experiencing considerable difficulties in fighting the French Chasseurs Alpins in the Vosges Mountains during the Battle of the Frontiers, the German Army determined to create its own specialized mountain units. The Royal Bavarian 1st and 2nd Snowshoe Battalions (Kgl. Bayerisches Schneeschuhbataillon I & II) were formed in Munich, Bavaria on 21 November 1914. A third battalion was formed in April 1915 from the 4th, 5th and 6th companies of the second battalion. In May 1915, the three battalions were brought together with a fourth (formed from troops of the other battalions and Bavarian Landwehr troops) to form the 3rd Jäger Regiment (Jäger Regiment Nr. 3). In October 1915, the designation Schneeschuhbataillon was eliminated.

In April 1915, Italy switched sides (Treaty of London), joined the Triple Entente and declared war on Austria-Hungary (de).

Also in May 1915, the previously separate Bavarian 1st, 2nd and 2nd Reserve Jäger Battalions were joined to form the Royal Bavarian 1st Jäger Regiment (Kgl. Bayer. Jäger Regiment Nr. 1). The Prussian 10th, 10th Reserve and 14th Reserve Jäger Battalions were also joined, forming the 2nd Jäger Regiment (Jäger Regiment Nr. 2).

These units, along with the elite Royal Bavarian Infantry Lifeguards Regiment (Infanterie-Leib-Regiment), the Bavarian Army bodyguard regiment, became the core of the Alpenkorps, and were complemented with additional artillery, machinegun and other support units. The Alpenkorps was officially founded on 18 May 1915 with Bavarian Generalleutnant Konrad Krafft von Dellmensingen as its commander, and Bavarian Generalmajor Ludwig Ritter von Tutschek and Prussian Generalmajor Ernst von Below as his brigade commanders.

== Order of battle ==
=== 27 May 1915 ===
- Kgl. Bayerische Jäger-Brigade 1:
  - Kgl. Bayerisches 1. Jäger-Regiment
    - 1. Kgl. Bayerisches Jäger-Bataillon König
    - 2. Kgl. Bayerisches Jäger-Bataillon
    - Kgl. Bayerisches Reserve-Jäger-Bataillon Nr. 2
  - Kgl. Bayerisches Infanterie-Leib-Regiment
- Kgl. Bayerische Jäger-Brigade 2:
  - Jäger-Regiment Nr. 2
    - Jäger-Bataillon Nr. 10
    - Reserve-Jäger-Bataillon Nr. 10
    - Reserve-Jäger-Bataillon Nr. 14
  - Jäger-Regiment Nr. 3
    - I./Jäger-Regiment Nr. 3 (Kgl. Bayerisches Schneeschuhbataillon I)
    - II./Jäger-Regiment Nr. 3 (Schneeschuhbataillon II)
    - III./Jäger-Regiment Nr. 3 (Schneeschuhbataillon III)
    - IV./Jäger-Regiment Nr. 3 (Kgl. Bayerisches Schneeschuhbataillon IV)
- Gebirgs-MG-Abteilungen Nr. 201–210 (206–209 were Bavarian)
- Reserve-MG-Abteilung Nr. 4
- 3.Eskadron/Kgl. Bayerisches 4. Chevauleger-Regiment König
- Gebirgs-Artillerie-Abteilung Nr. 1
- Kgl. Bayerische Gebirgs-Artillerie-Abteilung Nr. 2
- Feldartillerie-Abteilung Nr. 203
- Feldartillerie-Abteilung Nr. 204
- Fußartillerie-Batterie Nr. 101
- Fußartillerie-Batterie Nr. 102
- Pionier-Kompanie Nr. 101
- Kgl. Bayerische Pionier-Kompanie Nr. 102
- Kgl. Bayerische Gebirgs-Minenwerfer-Abteilung Nr. 269
- Gebirgs-Minenwerfer-Abteilung Nr. 270

=== 17 August 1918 ===
- 1. Kgl. Bayerische Jäger-Brigade:
  - Kgl. Bayerisches Infanterie-Leibregiment
  - Kgl. Bayerisches 1. Jäger-Regiment
  - Jäger-Regiment Nr. 2
  - MG-Scharfschützen-Abteilung Nr. 24
  - Gebirgs-MG-Abteilung Nr. 204
  - Gebirgs-MG-Abteilung Nr. 205
- 3.Eskadron/Kgl. Bayerisches 4. Chevauleger-Regiment König
- Kgl. Bayerischer Artillerie-Kommandeur 7:
  - Feldartillerie-Regiment Nr. 204
  - Gebirgs-Artillerie-Abteilung Nr. 6
  - I./Kgl. Bayerisches Reserve-Fußartillerie-Regiment Nr. 1
- Stab Kgl. Bayerisches 9. Pionier-Bataillon:
  - Kgl. Bayerische Pionier-Kompanie Nr. 102
  - Pionier-Kompanie Nr. 283
  - Gebirgs-Minenwerfer-Kompanie Nr. 175
- Divisions-Nachrichten-Kommandeur 622

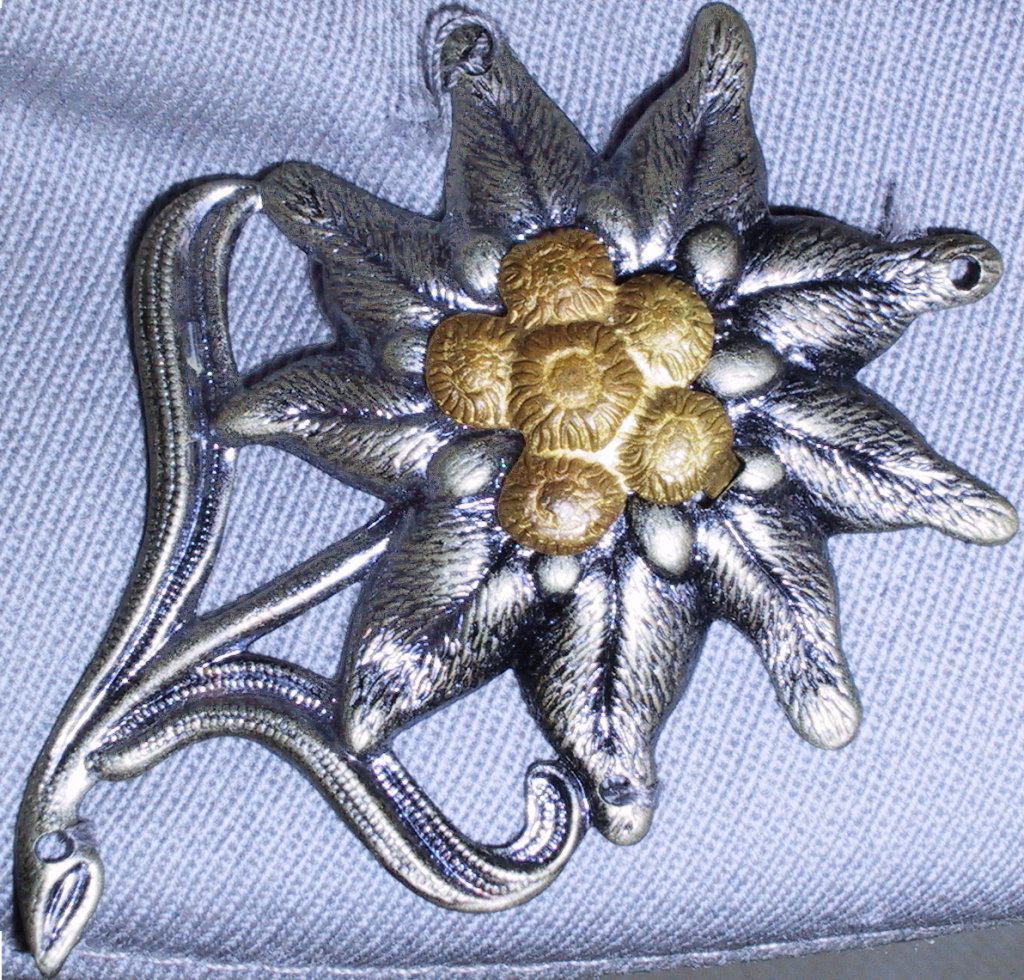
Edelweiss insignia

== Operations ==
=== First campaigns in the Dolomites and France ===
Although Germany and Italy were not at war until 1916, the Alpenkorps was immediately dispatched to reinforce the thinly occupied front line in the Dolomite mountains. It did not undertake offensive actions, but defended the front against repeated attacks by the Italian Alpini until Austria-Hungary was able to extract enough forces from the eastern war theatre and relocate them to the new front. The unit had an air arm, which was FFA 9, flying Pfalz Parasol aircraft. After four months, the Alpenkorps returned briefly to the Western Front, as now the Austro-Hungarian defenders were sufficient in numbers and entrenched enough to hold the front on their own. The Austro-Hungarian Kaiserschützen honored the men of the Alpenkorps by awarding them their unit insignia: the Edelweiss.

=== Serbia ===
After only a week in France and the Dolomites, the Alpenkorps was sent to fight in the Serbian Campaign.

=== Verdun ===
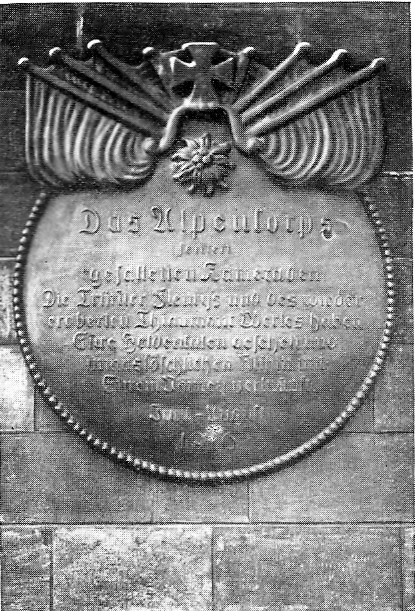
Plaque on a monument erected in Azannes August 1916

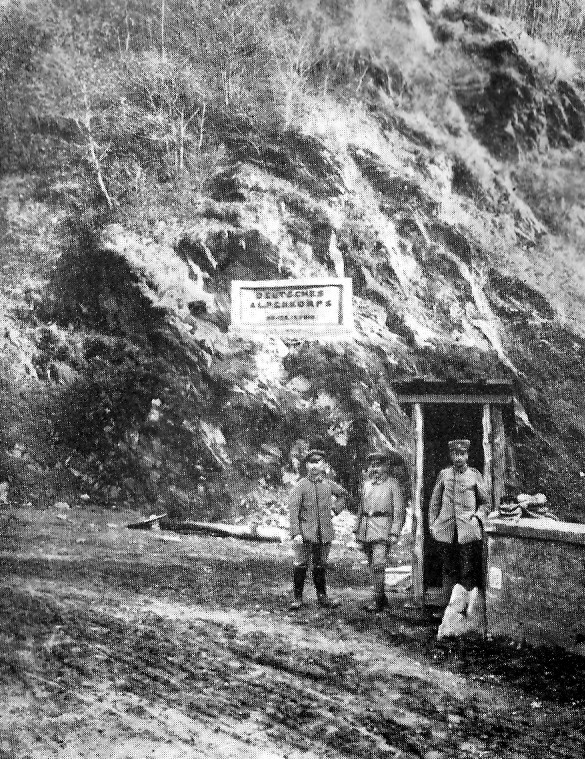
Plaque of the Alpenkorps in the Red Tower Pass at Verestorony, 1916

The Alpenkorps returned to France in March 1916. After a short respite, it entered into the Battle of Verdun in June 1916. The regiments of the Alpenkorps lost over 70% of their strength in the fighting around Fort Vaux and Fleury. After leaving the line, the regiments were reconstituted, and in mid-July 1916 the 3rd Jäger Regiment was transferred from the division. The 2nd Brigade headquarters was eliminated and the Alpenkorps became a triangular division with 1st Brigade controlling the other two Jäger regiments and the Infanterie-Leib-Regiment.

=== Romania ===
Romania entered the war on the side of the Entente on 27 August 1916. In September, the Alpenkorps was dispatched to fight in the Romanian Campaign. The Infanterie-Leib-Regiment suffered a number of losses in the mountain fighting in Romania, including one of its most prominent members, Prince Heinrich of Bavaria, a major and battalion commander. The Alpenkorps remained in Romania until April 1917 and then again returned to the Western Front. In August 1917, the Alpenkorps returned to Romania and participated in the final battles there in the wake of the Kerensky Offensive.

=== Caporetto ===
In September 1917, the Alpenkorps was sent once more to the Italian Front to reinforce the Austro-Hungarian Army for the upcoming 12th Battle of the Isonzo. By this point, the Royal Württemberg mountain battalion ("Königlich Württembergisches Gebirgsbataillon") had been attached to the division, and one of its members, the later-Generalfeldmarschall Erwin Rommel, would distinguish himself at Caporetto in November. Another company commander who distinguished himself at Caporetto, the Infanterie-Leib-Regiment's Ferdinand Schörner, would also rise to Field Marshal in World War II.

=== France ===
The Alpenkorps returned to the Western Front in 1918. It participated in the Battle of the Lys in April and fought in the Battle of Picardy in the Hundred Days Offensive. In October, it returned to the Balkans, where it was at the time of the Armistice.

== Traditions ==
The Alpenkorps was dissolved after the end of hostilities, but the traditions of its constituent regular units were carried on in the Reichswehr and then the Wehrmacht. The Edelweiss became the symbol of the German Gebirgsjäger. Although the Bundeswehr does not formally carry the traditions of any pre-1945 units, the Gebirgsjäger continued to wear the Edelweiss cap badge and informally maintain the traditions of the Alpenkorps.

== Notable members of the Alpenkorps ==
- Hermann Balck
- Otto von Below
- Franz Ritter von Epp
- Prince Heinrich of Bavaria
- Konrad Krafft von Dellmensingen
- Erich Löwenhardt
- Friedrich Paulus
- Erwin Rommel
- Ferdinand Schörner
