= Sălătrucu =

- Commune
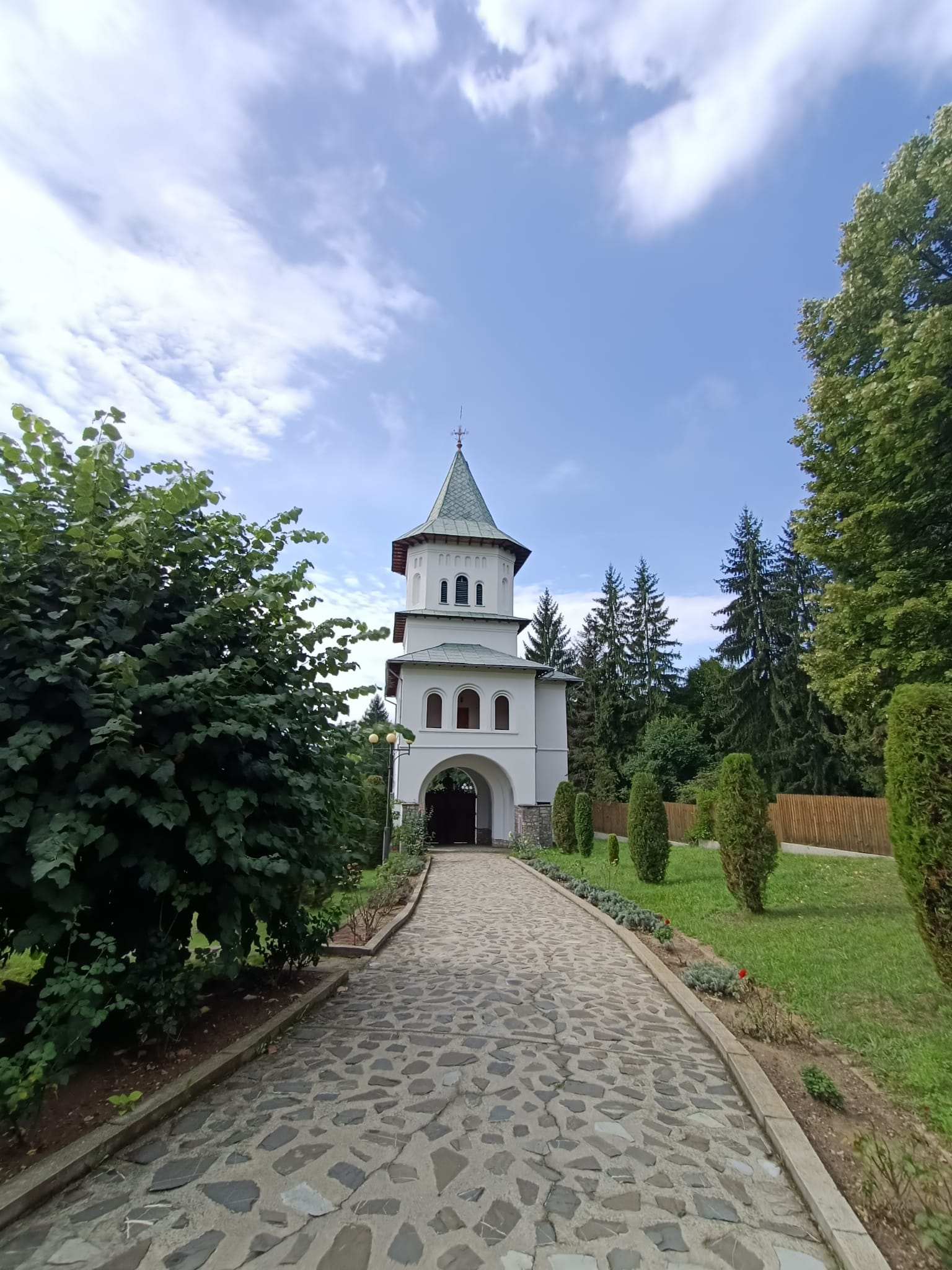
- Văleni Monastery

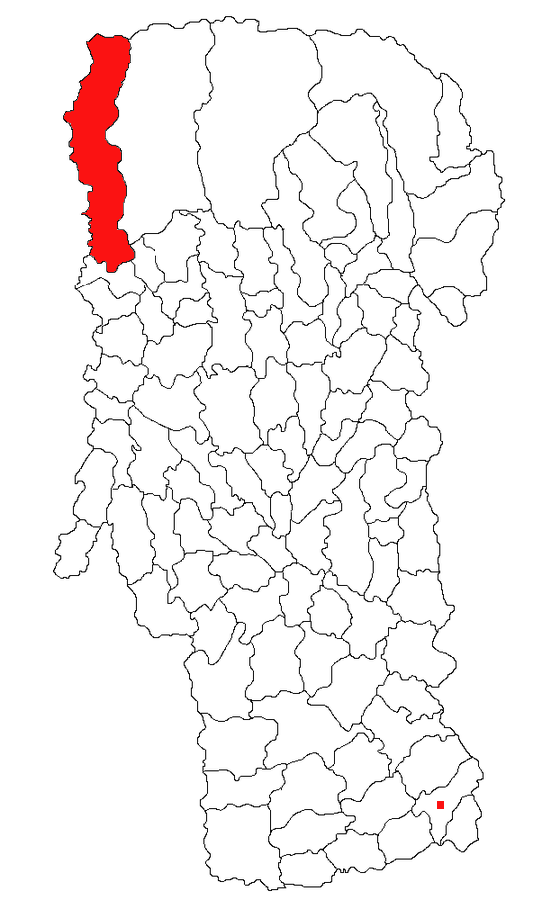
- Location in Argeș County

- Location in Romania
- Coordinates: 45°20′N 24°31′E
- Country: Romania
- County: Argeș

Government
  - Mayor (2020–2024): Nicolae Langer (PSD)
- Area: 137.87 km^{2} (53.23 sq mi)
- Elevation: 647 m (2,123 ft)
- Population (2021-12-01): 1,971
  - Density: 14.30/km^{2} (37.03/sq mi)
- Time zone: UTC+02:00 (EET)
  - Summer (DST): UTC+03:00 (EEST)
- Postal code: 117635
- Area code: +(40) 248
- Vehicle reg.: AG
- Website: primariasalatrucu.ro

Sălătrucu is a commune in Argeș County, in Muntenia, Romania. It is composed of two villages, Sălătrucu and Văleni.

The Battle of Sălătrucu took place here, 16–23 October 1916, during the Romanian Campaign of World War I.
