= Konrad Krafft von Dellmensingen =

German general

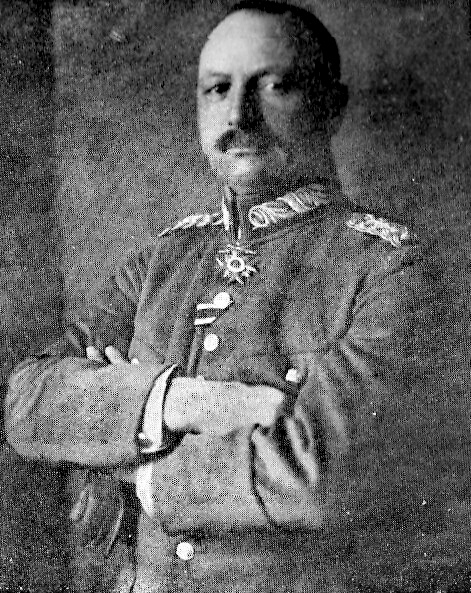
- Born: 24 November 1862; Laufen, Kingdom of Bavaria
- Died: 21 February 1953 (aged 90) Seeshaupt, Bavaria, West Germany
- Allegiance: Kingdom of Bavaria; German Empire
- Branch: Army
- Service years: 1881–1918
- Rank: General der Artillerie
- Commands: Alpenkorps, II Bavarian Army Corps
- Conflicts: Serbian Campaign, Verdun, Romanian Campaign, Caporetto, Spring Offensive
- Awards: Pour le Mérite with oak leaves, Military Order of Max Joseph, Bavarian Military Merit Order with swords, Württemberg Military Merit Order, House Order of Hohenzollern with swords, Prussian Crown Order with swords, etc.

Konrad Krafft von Dellmensingen (24 November 1862 – 21 February 1953) was a Bavarian Army general in World War I. He served as Chief of the General Staff of the Royal Bavarian Army before World War I and commanded the elite Alpenkorps, the Imperial German Army's mountain division formed in 1915.

== Early life ==
Krafft von Dellmensingen was born into a lower-ranking Bavarian noble family in Laufen, Upper Bavaria. His father was a royal notary. Konrad entered the Royal Bavarian Army as an officer candidate in August 1881 and was commissioned a second lieutenant in December 1883. After attending the Bavarian War Academy, he served as a general staff officer in various units. In 1902 he married Helene Zöhrer in Vienna, Austria-Hungary. They had two sons and one daughter.

Through the prewar years, Konrad Krafft von Dellmensingen proceeded up the ranks, generally alternating command and general staff assignments, until October 1, 1912, when he became Chief of the General Staff of the Royal Bavarian Army, a position he would hold until the mobilization for war in August 1914.

== World War I ==
On mobilization in 1914, Generalmajor Krafft von Dellmensingen became chief of the general staff of the German 6th Army, and served with that command in the Battle of the Frontiers and the Race to the Sea. On May 27, 1915, shortly after his promotion to Generalleutnant, he took command of the newly formed Alpenkorps, a provisional mountain division. He would lead the division until the end of February 1917, through fighting on the Italian Front, at Verdun, and in the invasions of Serbia and Romania (see Battle of Sălătrucu). He received the Pour le Mérite, Prussia's highest military honor, on September 13, 1916, and oak leaves to the Pour le Mérite on December 11, 1916, as well as honors from Bavaria, other German states, and their Austro-Hungarian and Ottoman allies.

On March 1, 1917, Krafft von Dellmensingen became chief of staff of Army Group Duke Albrecht of Württemberg, where he served until September 9, 1917. On September 11, 1917, he received the Commander's Cross of the Württemberg Military Merit Order, Württemberg's highest military decoration. He then became chief of staff of the 14th Army under Otto von Below, and helped plan the operation that would become the successful Battle of Caporetto. On October 24, 1917, he received the Grand Cross of the Military Order of Max Joseph, Bavaria's highest military decoration.

On February 2, 1918, the 14th Army in Italy was dissolved and the army's staff under Otto von Below took command of the 17th Army, newly formed for the German spring offensive in France. After helping prepare the army for the offensive, Konrad Krafft von Dellmensingen was promoted to General der Artillerie and given command of the II Bavarian Army Corps, which he led from April 18, 1918, through the German spring offensive and the defensive battles that followed to the war's end.

During the very last days of the war, in November 1918, Konrad Krafft von Dellmensingen was commander of those Bavarian border troops which were sent to Tyrol after the Armistice of Villa Giusti, which was signed on 3 November 1918 and took effect on 4 November. The terms of the armistice allowed allied troops to march through Austria with the implication of a possible attack on Germany from the south. The Bavarians - now against protests from Austrian authorities - occupied some places south of the Brennerpass, like Franzensfeste or Gossensass, and a bridge south of Brixen was blown up. When Italian troops arrived, however, and due to the overthrow of the monarchy in Bavaria by Kurt Eisner, the Bavarians retreated without combat.

== Post-war ==
Konrad Krafft von Dellmensingen retired from the army in December 1918. He was active in monarchist circles after the war seeking a return of the Bavarian monarchy. He also participated in the 1920s in the preparation of the official history of the Bavarian Army in the war: in 1926 and 1928, he edited a 2-volume account of the Battle of Caporetto, Der Durchbruch am Isonzo (The Breakthrough on the Isonzo).

In 1937, a barracks complex in Garmisch-Partenkirchen was named the "Krafft-von-Dellmensingen-Kaserne". In 1945, the Kaserne was taken over by the United States Army. The program of denazification was launched after the end of the Second World War; the name “Krafft-von-Dellmensingen-Kaserne” was deleted. On 9 July 1975 this decision was reversed; the barracks were named after Dellmensingen again. Today this building houses part of the George C. Marshall European Center for Security Studies. The name "Krafft-von-Dellmensingen-Kaserne" was removed from the outside of the barracks on 29 June 2011. Krafft von Dellmensingen had died in Seeshaupt, Upper Bavaria.

== Decorations and awards ==
- Order of the Red Eagle; 3rd class
- Pour le Mérite (13 September 1916); Oak Leaves added on 11 December 1916
- Commander of the Württemberg Military Merit (11 September 1917)
- Grand Cross of the Military Order of Max Joseph
- Order of the Iron Crown (Austria), 1st class

== Notes ==
Military offices
Preceded by Oskar von Xylander	Quartermaster General / Chief of the General Staff (Kingdom of Bavaria); 1912–1914	Succeeded by Abolished
