= Constantin Kirițescu =

Romanian zoologist, educator and historian

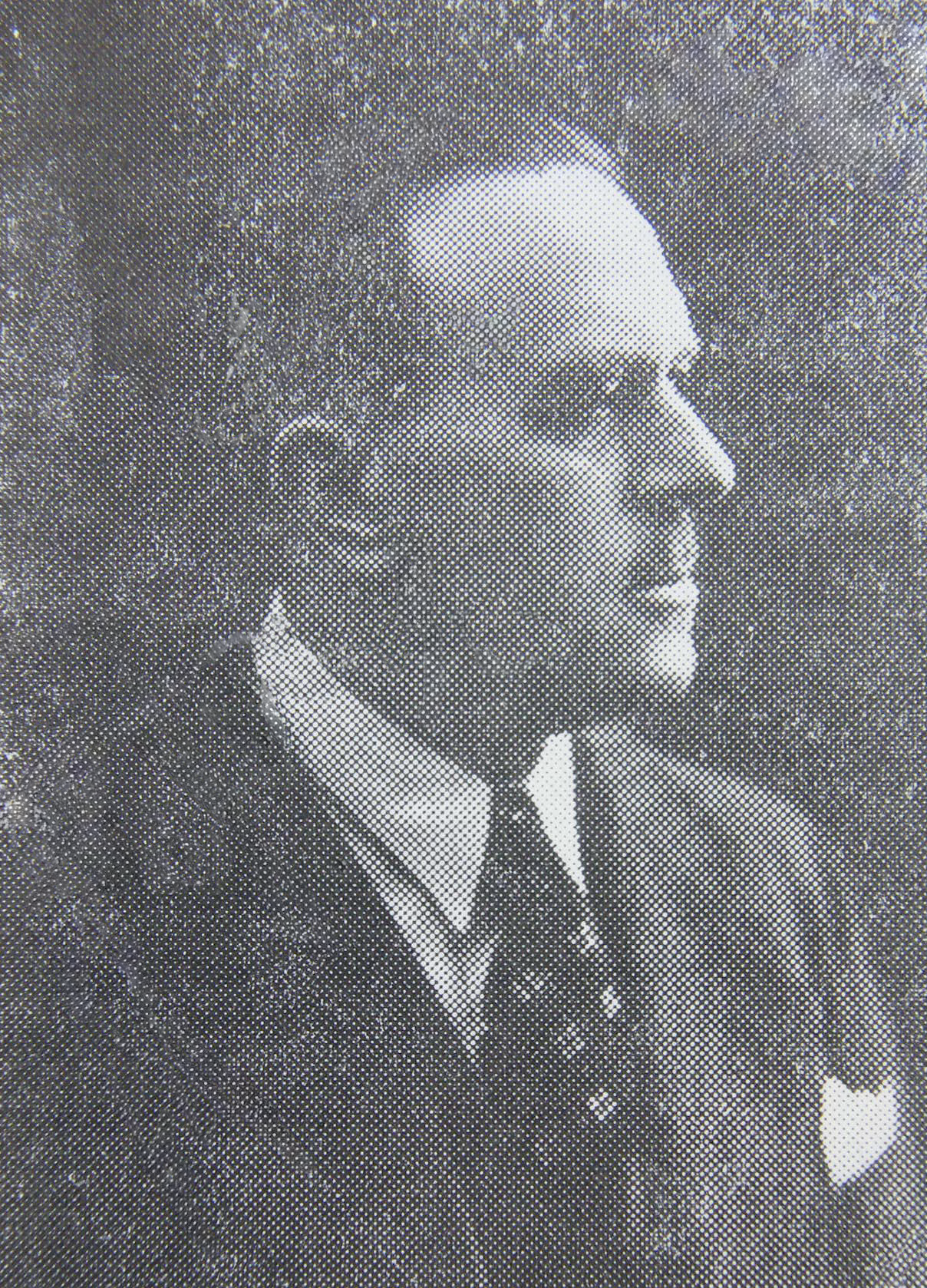
Constantin Kirițescu

Constantin Kirițescu (September 3, 1876 – August 12, 1965) was a Romanian zoologist, educator and historian. Born and schooled in Bucharest, he occupied successive posts in the Education Ministry, with education being a running theme of his diverse interests. He was among the founders of the Romanian Academy of Sciences.

Kirițescu was a teacher at Saint Sava High School. His name is most associated with Istoria războiului pentru reîntregirea României ("The History of the War That United Romania"), a 1922 account of the part played by Romania in World War I.

== Publications ==
- Kirițescu, Constantin (1922). Istoria războiului pentru întregirea României: 1916–1919 (in Romanian). Bucureşti: România Nouă. OCLC 935411585.
