= Predeal Pass =

Mountain pass in the Carpathian Mountains in Romania

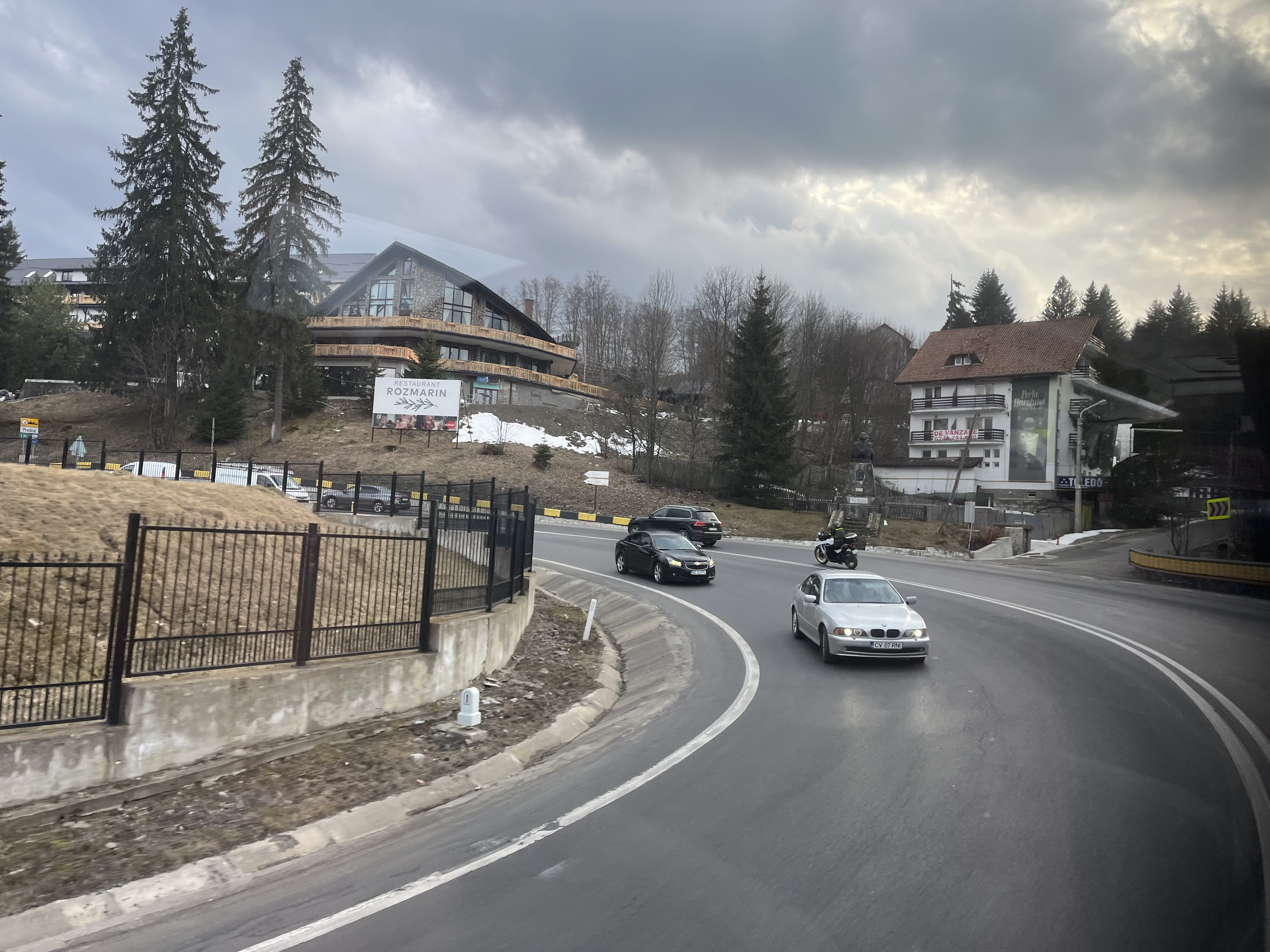

- Location within Romania
- Elevation: 1,033 metres (3,389 ft)
- Traversed by: DN1

Third Approach
- Location: Romania
- Range: Southern Carpathians
- Coordinates: 45°30′46″N 25°34′20″E

Predeal Pass (Romanian: Pasul Predeal, Hungarian: Tömösi-szoros) is a mountain pass (elevation 1,033 m (3,389 ft)) in the Carpathian Mountains in Romania. It connects the Prahova River valley to the south with the lowlands around Brașov to the north. It separates the Southern Carpathians (Bucegi Mountains) from the Eastern Carpathians (Piatra Mare Mountains). It is an important passage for traffic between southern Romania (including the capital Bucharest) and central Romania (eastern Transylvania), crossed by National Road 1 and the Bucharest—Brașov railway. The town Predeal is situated near the pass.
