= Jiu Bridge =

Bridge in Romania

Coordinates: 45°2′33″N 23°16′1″E

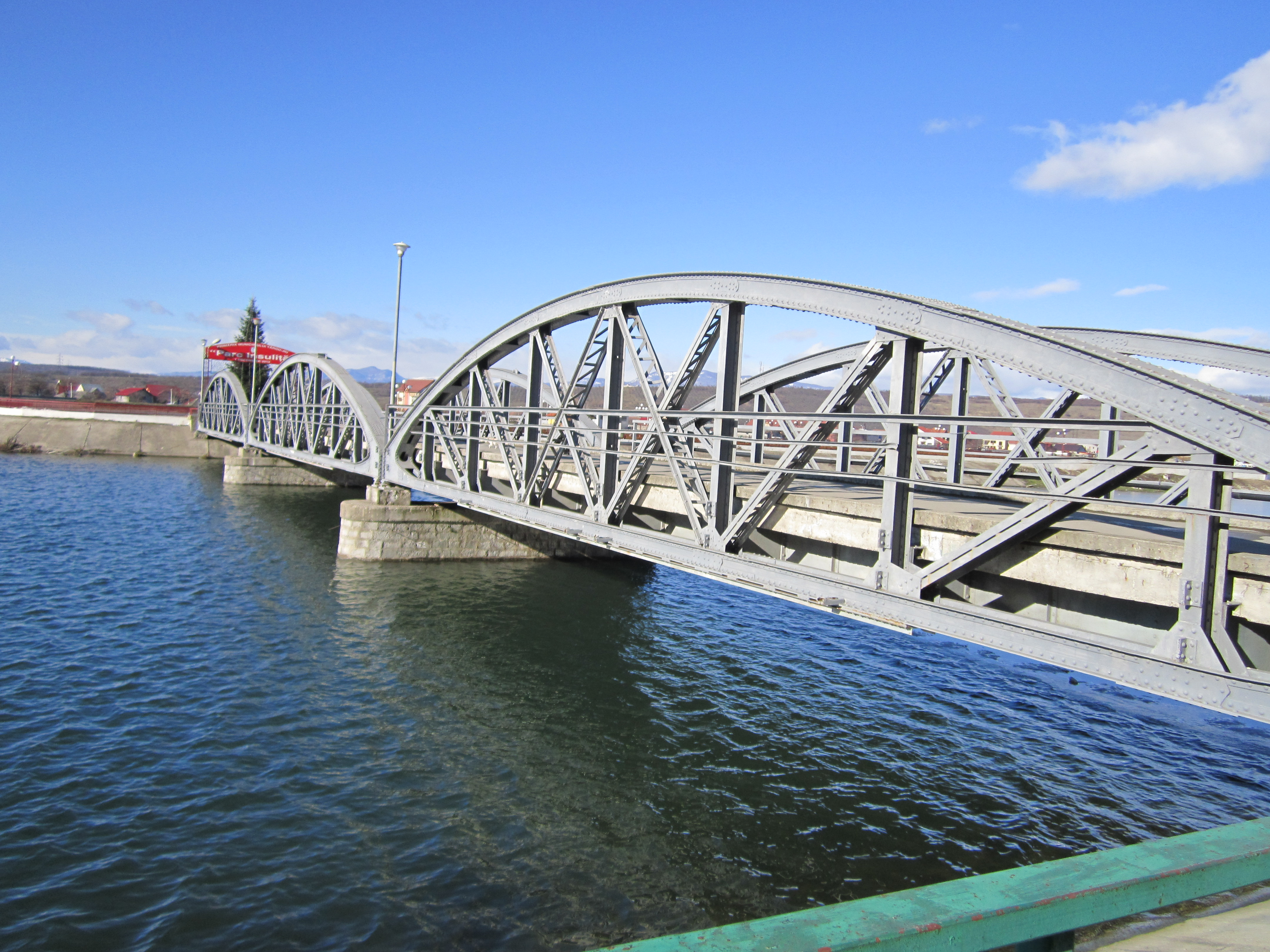
Jiu Bridge in new location

Jiu Bridge (Romanian: Podul Jiului) is a historic truss bridge across the Jiu River. It consisted of five arches mounted on pillars and connected two parts of the city of Târgu Jiu, Romania, where the streets Unirii and Calea Severinului meet.

At the end of the 20th century, three of the original five arches have been moved one kilometer north from their initial location, to form a shorter bridge that connects Târgu Jiu Central park with an artificial island on the Jiu river.

== History ==
The bridge was built in 1896 by the company Daydé & Pillé of Paris (now part of Eiffel Constructions métalliques).

During World War I, on October 14/27, 1916, heavy fighting took place for the control of the bridge between the German Alpen Korps of general Falkenhayn and Romanian military forces assisted by the local population.

== Image gallery ==
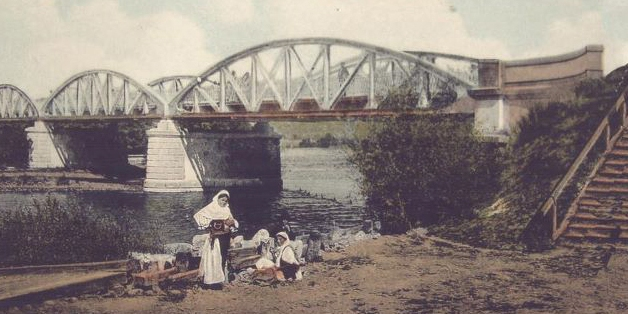
Jiu Bridge at the turn of the 20th century.

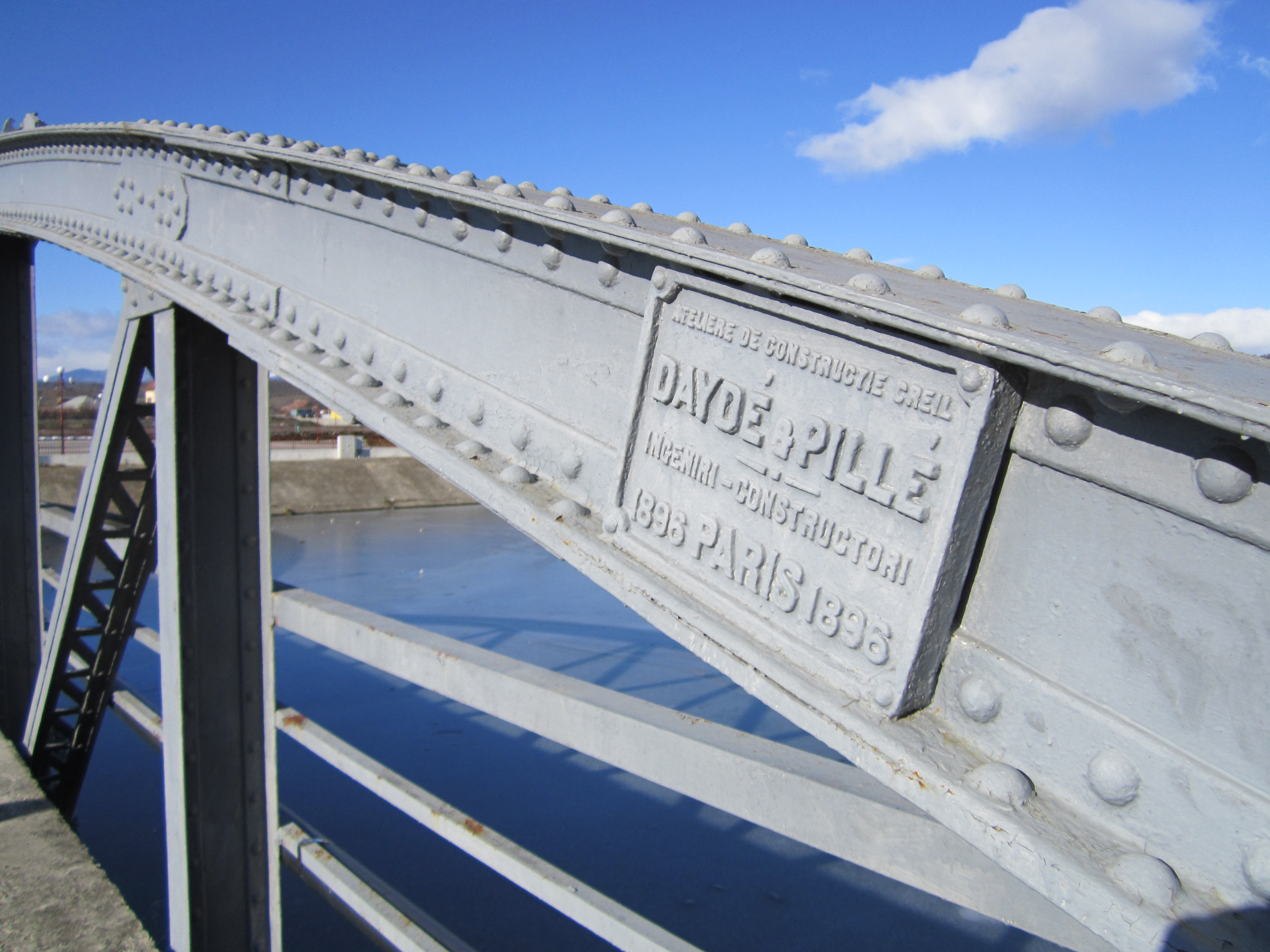
Daydé & Pillé name plate

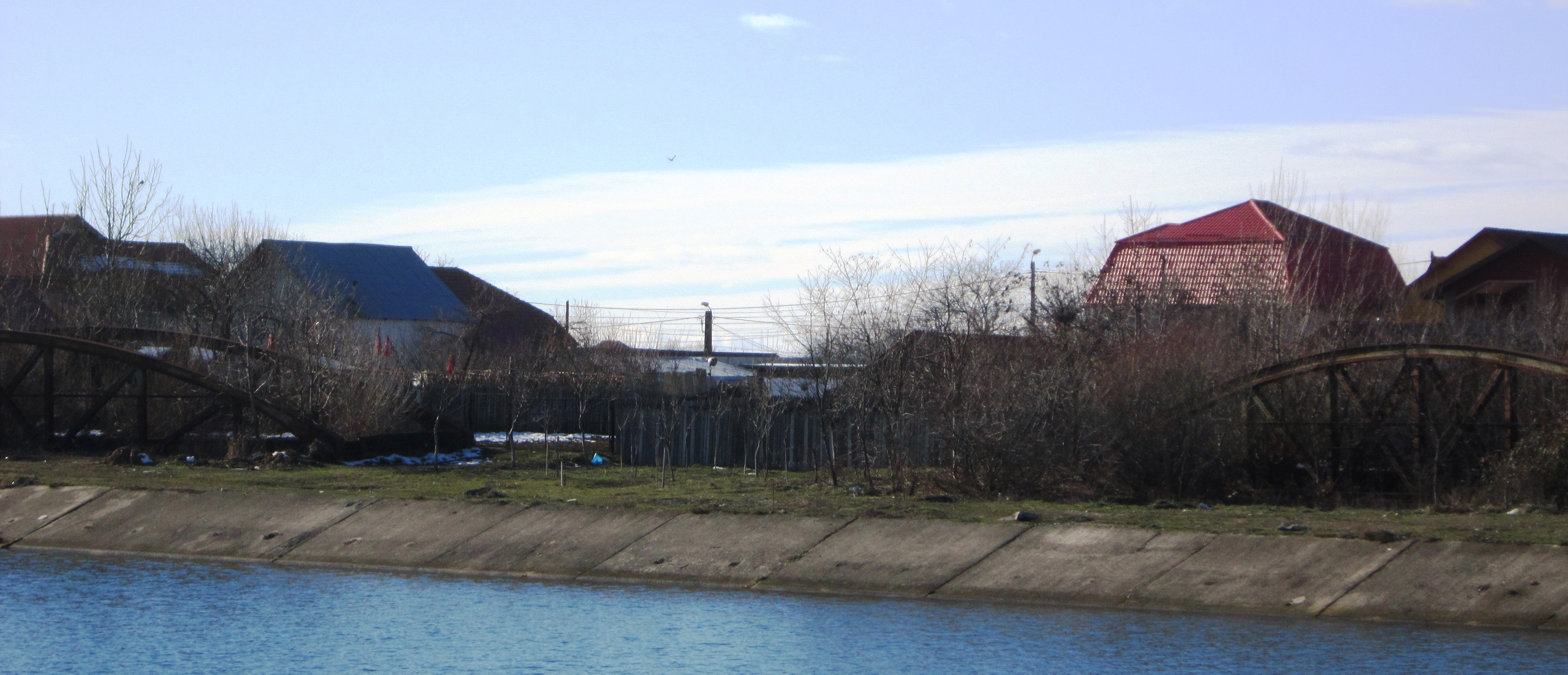
The remaining two arches of the bridge

== See also ==
- List of bridges in Romania
