= First Army (Romania) =

- Armata 1
- Active: 16 August 1916 – 1947; 1980 – 2000
- Country: Romania
- Branch: Romanian Land Forces
- Garrison/HQ: Bucharest
- Anniversaries: 18 August
- Engagements: World War I: Eastern Front; Petrozsény Campaign; Kerensky Offensive; Battle of Mărăști; Battle of Mărășești; World War II: Eastern Front; Battle of Debrecen; Western Carpathian Offensive; Budapest offensive; Prague Offensive

Commanders
- Notable commanders: General Ioan Culcer; General Eremia Grigorescu; General Petre Dumitrescu; General Nicolae Macici

The First Army (Romanian: Armata 1) was a field army of the Romanian Land Forces, active from 1916 to 2000. The successor of the First Army was the 1st Infantry Division.

== World War I ==
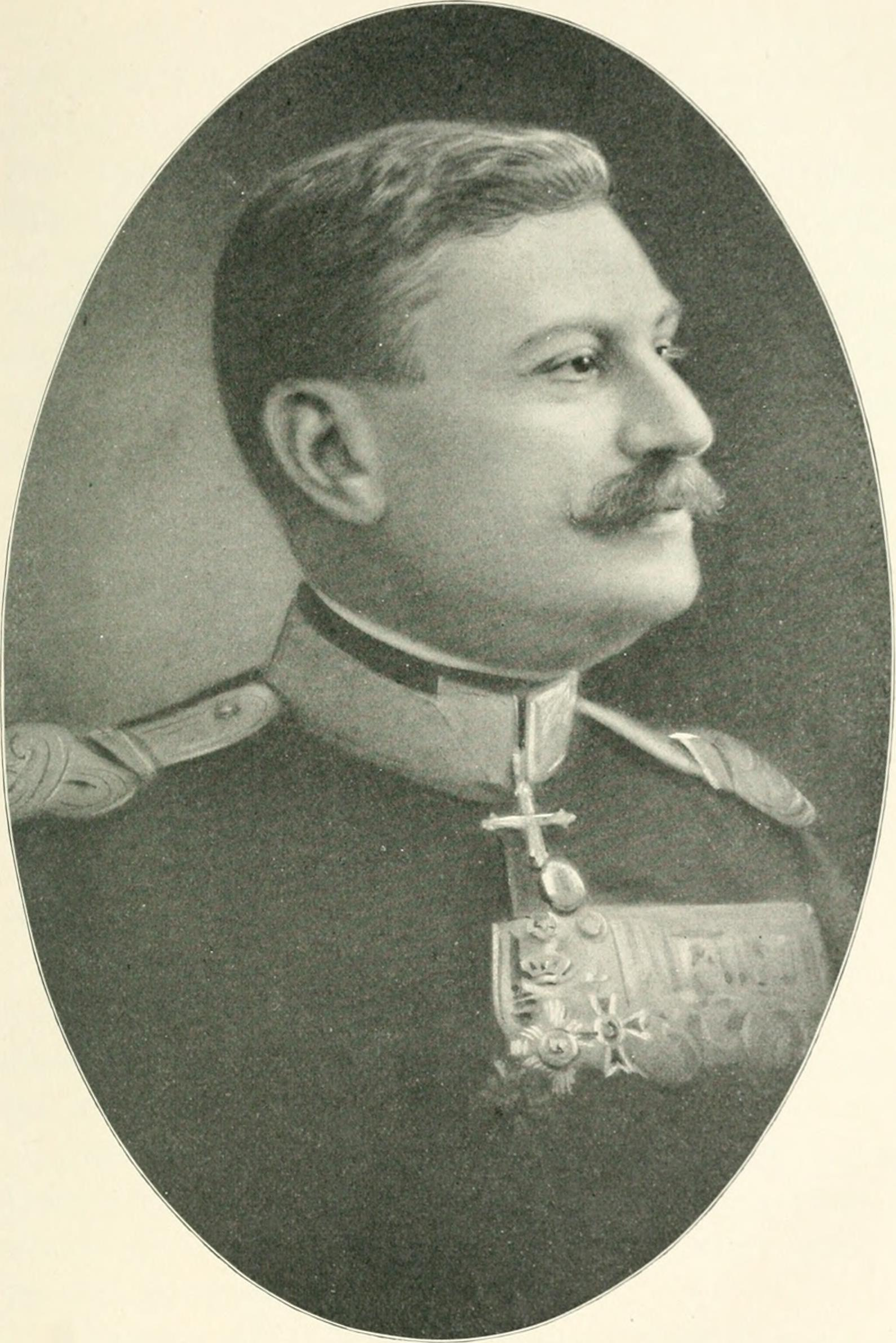
Eremia Grigorescu

The First Army took part in the Romanian Campaign of World War I. Its commanders during that time were :

- Divisional General Ioan Culcer: 15 August 1916 – 11 October 1916
- Brigadier General Ioan Dragalina: 11 October 1916 – 12 October 1916
- Brigadier General Nicolae Petala: 13 October 1916 – 21 October 1916
- Brigadier General Paraschiv Vasilescu: 21 October 1916 – 12 November 1916
- Brigadier General Dumitru Stratilescu: 13 November 1916 – 19 December 1916
- Divisional General Constantin Christescu: 11 June 1917 – 30 July 1917
- Divisional General Eremia Grigorescu: 30 July 1917 – 1 July 1918

== World War II ==
During Operation München, when Romania entered World War II on the side of the Axis in June–July 1941, the First Army was in the interior of Romania while the Third and Fourth Armies formed the main Romanian assault force. The First Army comprised at the time the 1st Army Corps (2nd, 11th, 30th, 31st IDs), 6th Army Corps, and 7th Army Corps. (Romanian Artillery p. 117)

In August 1944, the Red Army entered Romania after driving back Army Group South from the region. On August 23, Marshal Ion Antonescu was dismissed by King Michael I, and Romania declared war on Germany and Hungary some days later. The Soviets took control of the oilfields in the Ploiești area, and the Romanian Army was used to fight German forces on the Eastern Front.

The First Army became one of the Romanian armies fighting for the Red Army on the Eastern Front. In its campaign from August 1944 to May 1945, the Romanian Army lost some 64,000 men killed. At the Battle of Debrecen in October 1944, where Romanian units played a key part in the overall Soviet offensive, the First Army consisted of the 4th Army Corps with the 2nd Infantry Division and the 4th Infantry Division, and the 7th Army Corps with the 9th Infantry Division and 19th Infantry Division. The 7th Army Corps, with the 2nd and 19th Infantry Divisions and what was reported as the 9th Cavalry Division, then took part in the Siege of Budapest as part of the Red Army's 3rd Ukrainian Front.

The last offensive of World War II in which the First Army took part in was the Prague Offensive in May 1945. During this offensive, the First Army operated together with the Romanian Fourth Army as part of the Soviet 2nd Ukrainian Front. The offensive started on May 6, a few days before the end of the war. German resistance in the east was now limited to small pockets scattered across Germany, Czechoslovakia, and Austria. By May 11 and 12, all remaining German pockets of resistance in the east were crushed.

=== WW II Commanders ===
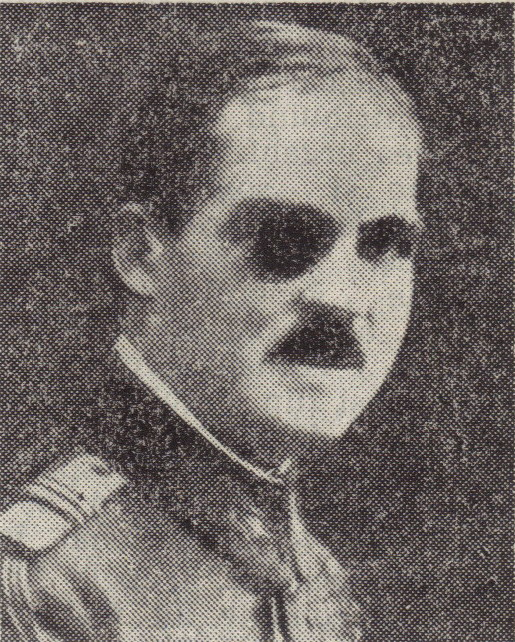
Nicolae Macici

- Divisional General Gheorghe Florescu (23 March 1939 – 2 June 1940)
- Army Corps General Grigore Cornicioiu (2 June 1940 – 9 September 1940)
- Divisional General Gheorghe Leventi (acting) (9 September 1940 – 25 March 1941)
- Divisional General Dimitrie I. Popescu (25 March 1941 – 9 November 1941)
- Army Corps General Nicolae Macici (9 November 1941 – 12 February 1945)
- Army General Vasile Atanasiu (13 February 1945 – 30 April 1946)

== After World War II ==
General Ioan Mihail Racoviță commanded the 1st Army from 20 May 1946 to 30 June 1947. Like the other armies, the First Army was transformed into a "Military Region" in 1947. In 1960, the Military Regions were disbanded and reformed into the 2nd and 3rd Armies. From 1980, the two armies were once again reorganized into four armies, with the 1st Army being headquartered in Bucharest.

In 1989, the order of battle of the First Army was as follows:

- 1st Mechanised Division (Cat A) – Bucharest: T-55A, TR-77, and T-72 tanks, SU-100 SP ATG, TAB-71/-71M APCs, MLI-84 IFVs, S-60 57mm and Md.1980 30mm AA Guns, M-30 122mm and Md.1981 152mm howitzers, APR-40 40x122mm MRLs.
- 57th Tank Division (Cat A) – Bucharest: T-55A and TR-85 tanks, TAB-71/-71M APCs, Md.1980 30mm AA Guns, M-30 122mm and Md.1981 152mm howitzers, APR-40 40x122mm MRLs.
- 4th Mountain Brigade (Cat A) – Curtea de Argeș.

The First Army was redesignated the 1st Territorial Army Corps in 2000 and the 1st Infantry Division in 2008.
