= Gherasim Safirin =

Romanian cleric (1849–1922)

- Bishop of Roman
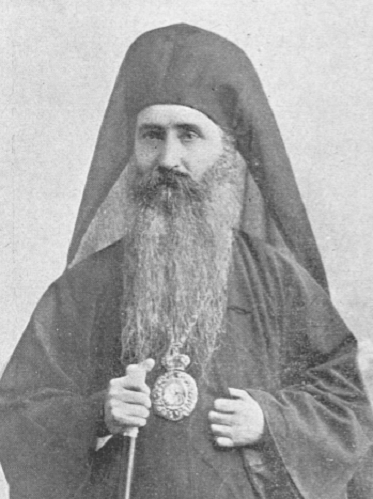
- Gherasim Safirin ca. 1910
- Church: Romanian Orthodox Church
- Appointed: February 1900
- Term ended: June 24, 1911
- Predecessor: Ioanichie Floru
- Successor: Calist Ialomițeanul (Botoșăneanul)
- Other post: Vicar of Râmnic

Orders
- Ordination: 1878 by Athanasie Stoenescu

Personal details
- Born: Gheorghe (or George) Safirin; October 1849 Izvorălu, Mehedinți County, Wallachia
- Died: February 14, 1922 (aged 72) Frăsinei Monastery, Vâlcea County, Kingdom of Romania
- Buried: Frăsinei Monastery
- Residence: Roman
- Children: Constantin Chiricescu (adopted)
- Profession: Schoolteacher, translator, polemicist, composer
- Education: Athens University

Gherasim Safirin ([ɡeraˈsim safiˈrin]; born Gheorghe or George Safirin, also rendered Safirim, Saffirin, Saffirinu, or Safrim; October 1849 – February 14, 1922) was a Wallachian, later Romanian cleric who served as a bishop in the Romanian Orthodox Church and was deposed following a national controversy. Originally a schoolteacher, he felt attracted to monastery life an took orders in 1873, becoming a deacon the following year. His second career was as a seminary professor attached to the Râmnic Diocese, where, as principal, he also instituted a campaign for transparency and reform. He was eventually deposed, but still took over as vicar for two separate periods. A translator, polemicist, and composer of church music, he was eventually elected as the Bishop of Roman in 1900, and became a putative candidate for the Metropolitan Bishop in 1909. He lost the latter race to Atanasie Mironescu, his lifelong rival.

Safirin placed himself at the center of a scandal surrounding the attributes of the Romanian Synod. He objected to the secularist agenda of the National Liberals and to Atanasie's concessions in this respect. In 1910, he issued excommunication against his rivals, then retracted, eventually suing Atanasie before the Synod. His cause was supported by a coalition of traditionalist churchgoers, Catholic observers, and members of the opposition Conservative Party. The latter group withdrew its support upon coming to power in 1911, and Safirin was left more exposed.

The Synod eventually cleared Atanasie of all charges, but pressured both Safirin and Atanasie into resigning. Safirin resisted coercion, then left the country. He returned to favor in 1913, but was unable to obtain the Râmnic bishopric for himself, and eventually retired to Frăsinei Monastery. He is remembered as a controversial figure: obstinate to the point of mental illness, with a rare penchant for politics.

== Biography ==
=== Early life and monasticism ===
Born in Izvorălu, Mehedinți County, Safirin was allegedly the son of a Greek Romanian man and his Romanian wife (or, according to various rumors, mistress). He studied at what is now Carol I National College in Craiova, graduating in 1870. From 1870 to 1873, he was both French teacher and principal at the gymnasium in Târgu Jiu, but took a sabbatical to live in contemplation among the monks of Mount Athos. He was himself tonsured a monk at Tismana Monastery in 1873, despite not having the formal requirements for the job, including a seminary graduation. In order to gain acceptance, he declared himself a "theomaniac".

Eventually, in 1874, Safirin was ordained a deacon for the Râmnic Diocese. He also resumed his work in teaching, encouraged to do so by bishop Athanasie Stoenescu and by his former students. From 1875 to 1889, he taught morals, liturgics and pastoral theology at the Râmnicu Vâlcea seminary. He began collecting old books for the Romanian Synod's library, and, in 1877, transported hundreds of books from Horezu Monastery to Bucharest.

In 1878, he became a priest, and also the seminary's principal. Safirin, who used his salary to sponsor his graduates' continued training in theology, accused his predecessor of corruption. At the time, he adopted Constantin Chiricescu, an orphan student from Topești, who later became head of the church printing press. His work as a principal also led him to write and publish the typikon for aspiring priests (1878; second edition 1897) and an 1885 dissertation on monasticism, Monahii sunt gloria Bisericei lui Hristos ("Monks are the Glory of Christ's Church"). In that context, he also began his work as anti-Catholic polemicist, translating La papauté hérétique by Wladimir Guettée (1885).

This period pitted him against the professors, many of whom were sacked by Safirin. They accused the principal of tolerating homosexuality on school grounds, and of harassing a destitute woman. His protector Stonescu having since died, Safirin was ultimately deposed by Dimitrie Sturdza, the Minister of Education and Religious Affairs. That year, he published in Râmnicu Vâlcea a brochure in which he outlined his defense (and which he signed as "Gerasim Saffirinu"). An archimandrite from 1888, Safirin was vicar of Râmnic from 1889 to 1890.

For the next four years, already in his forties, he studied at the theology faculty of the National University of Athens, Greece, obtaining an undergraduate degree. Registered as Gerasimos Saffirinos, he was presenting himself as an ardent Philhellene to his teachers. Safirin also asked to be examined ahead of other students: at the time, he had been promised a seat on the Synod, and did not want to miss out on the opportunity. The professors refused to do so without explicit permission from the Romanian Metropolitan Iosif Gheorghian, who refused to grant it. Safirin returned home in 1894, and until 1899, was again employed by Râmnic seminary, this time as a teacher of Latin.

In May 1899, Safirin was reelected vicar bishop of Râmnic, using the title Craioveanul, and was consecrated in July. In February 1900, he was elected, and shortly thereafter enthroned as Bishop of Roman. According to his apologist C. Cernăianu, from his early years in office, Safirin clamped down on priestly corruption and the intrusions of political power. He was also an ex officio member of the Senate of Romania, but, Cernăianu notes, took distance from other church senators, whom he regarded as undignified, and mostly kept to himself. At the time, his adopted son was also investigated by government and suspended.

=== 1909–1911 trial ===
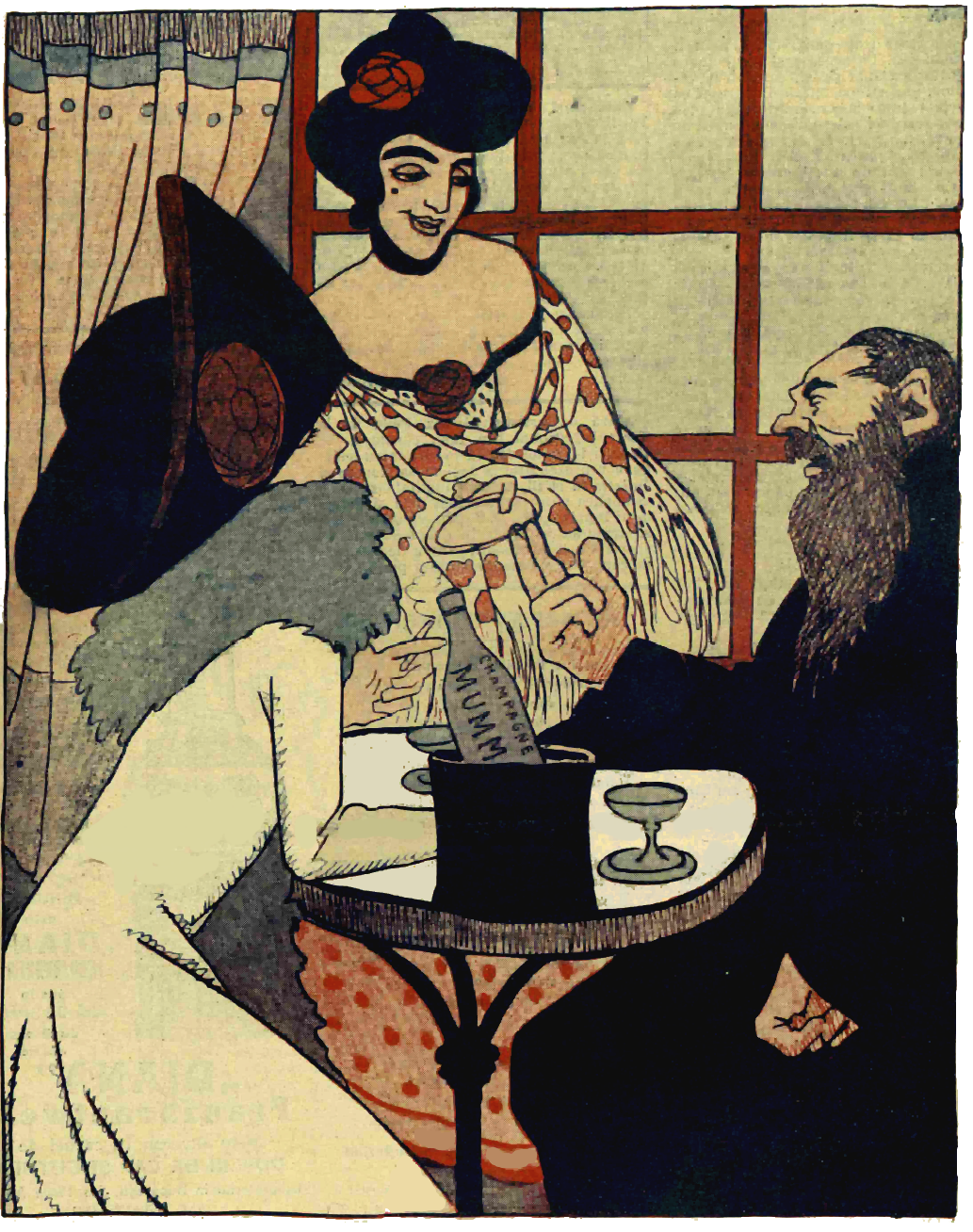
Cartoon by Ion Theodorescu-Sion in Furnica, March 1909, depicting an Orthodox priest entertaining prostitutes at a café-chantant

According to the Catholic lawyer Theodorian-Carada, Safirin was already disliked by the governing National Liberals when, in January 1909, Metropolitan Iosif died. For this reason, he was overlooked in elections for the vacant seat, which went to Atanasie Mironescu on February 5. Safirin soon emerged as a critic of his own church, when Synod instituted a consistory under civilian supervision, and in part controlled by the Ministry of Education and Religious Affairs. The new regulation "was widely seen as too permissive in allowing any Romanian to be a possible candidate for the church hierarchy. [...] the establishment of the Superior Clerical Consistory was directed towards bringing the interests of the lower clergy closer to the decisions of the church hierarchy." Initially, Safirin proposed that the consistory be allowed only a consultative role, and took position in his speeches at the Senate rostrum. When the Synod would not rescind, Safirin left the deliberations and, citing in his defense "the fundamental laws of the Christian Orthodox Church", he called excommunication (afurisenie) upon the Synod and Metropolitan Atanasie. The latter, as Safirin himself noted, had been an opponent of secularization during his years as bishop of Râmnic.

The Synod voted to cancel the excommunication as unlawful—unusually, Atanasie presided upon sessions deciding his own name-clearing—, and asked Safirin to return for discussions or risk forfeiting his bishop's seat. The scandal, stoked by the secularizing Education Minister, Spiru Haret, was quelled in January 1910, when Bishop Gherasim withdrew the excommunication himself. The indignant Safirin soon noted that the Metropolitan had not heeded his advice to review the law for possible signs of heresy. On May 16, he lodged a formal complaint against Atanasie for a trial by Synod. Other clerics also joined him as plaintiffs, adding to the accusations. By the time the formal trial began on May 20, Atanasie was also investigated for plagiarism, sins of the flesh, and for conspiring with Catholics such as Theodorian-Carada.

In return, Atanasie's supporters attacked Safirin for his questionable origin and alleged insanity. While the latter accusation was mainly grounded in a reading of his self-diagnosis as a "theomaniac", church historian Ciprian-Marius Sîrbu argues that Safirin's public statements were "borderline pathological". He speculates that, after being moved to Roman, Safirin was jealous of Ghenadie Georgescu, the titular bishop of Râmnic. However, Sîrbu also writes that the consistory, as a "double for the Synod", was "anti-canonical".

The scandal snowballed into a political and cultural battle. While the Metropolitan was backed by Haret and his National Liberals, Safirin's cause was endorsed by the Conservative Party, which had risen to power under Petre P. Carp. Conservative Christians of the time expressed the hope that Carp would effect a "moral regeneration" of the church, and undo Haret's controversial work. The pro-Safirin camp included, alongside Cernăianu, public intellectuals such as Constantin Rădulescu-Motru, Eraclie Sterian, and Mircea Demetriade, and clerics such as Iuliu Scriban and Ilie (Ilarie) Teodorescu; reportedly, only one follower was himself a bishop: Conon Arămescu-Donici of Huși. The nationalist historian and publicist Nicolae Iorga also campaigned for the anti-secularists, until he suddenly changed sides, along with much of the Conservative Party itself. The trial also interested the Romanian communities of Austria-Hungary, where many of the National Party conservatives sided with Safirin, as did Lazăr Gherman, Dimitrie Dan and other clerics of the Metropolis of Bukovina.

According to Sîrbu, the scandal was also used by the Metropolitan's numerous adversaries, including Catholic missionaries, but also Orthodox priests investigated for corruption. The issue did grab attention in the Catholic world: according to columnist Jean-Marie of Échos d'Orient, the scandal broke Romanian Orthodoxy into two churches—a truly Orthodox one headed by Safirin; and a "presbyterian" one, under Atanasie. Although his own correspondence with Atanasie was a central piece of the trial, in 1937 Theodorian-Carada admitted that he supported Safirin, and that he and Chiricescu fought their battle with Haret "through the Bishop of Roman". However, he denies that the local Roman Catholic Church had any involvement in the affair: "More than once, Archbishop Netzhammer advised me to give up on my fight. Same for Vladimir Ghica." As he notes, Haret took pains not to have to deal with the scandal himself, and was relieved when the Carp cabinet took over in December 1910. As the new Education Minister, Constantin C. Arion demanded a swift resolution.

=== Dismissal and later life ===
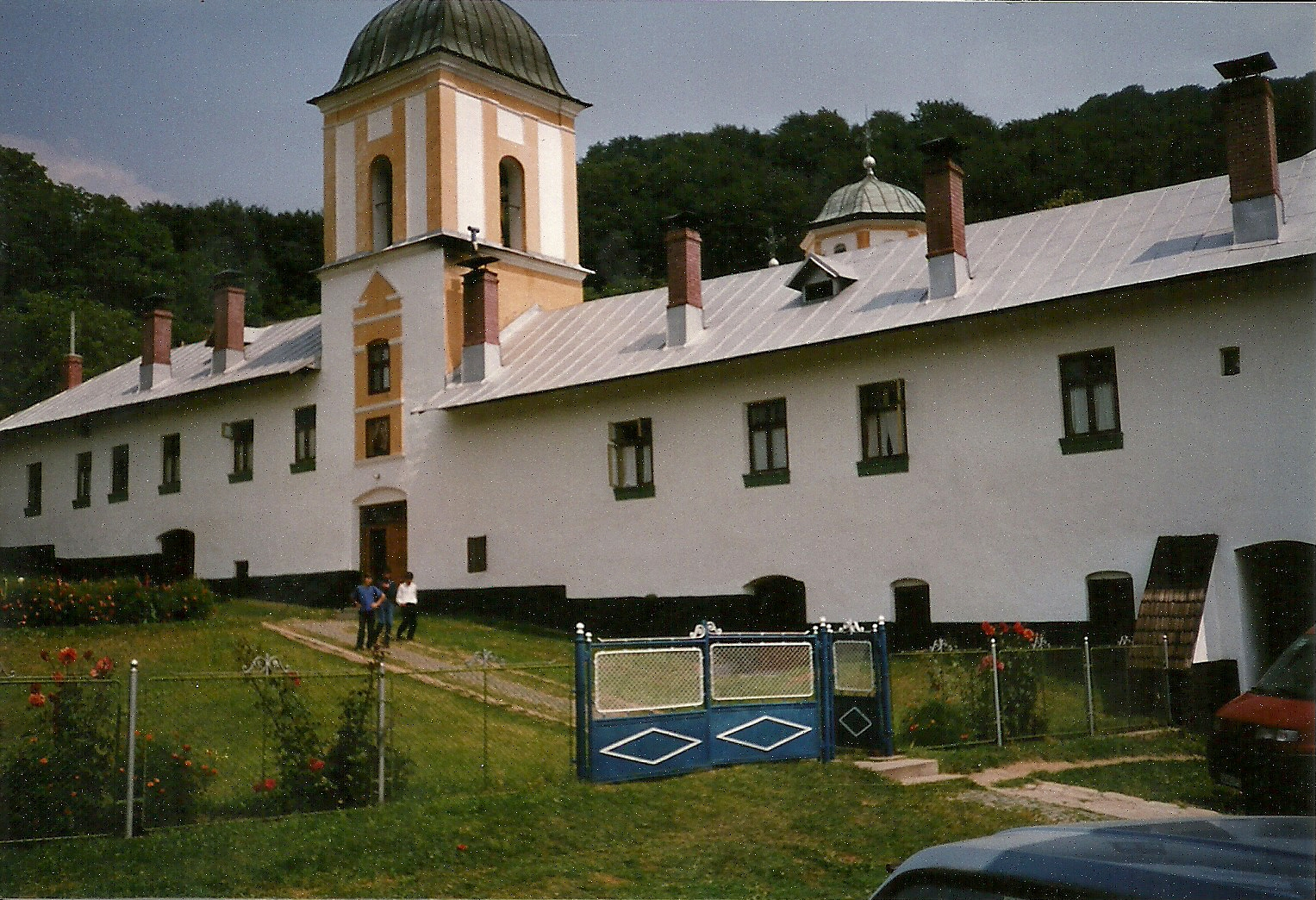
Frăsinei Monastery, where Safirin spent his final years

The lively and protracted trial included "abuse and threats against [the witnesses], deposition changes, excommunications of priests, abusive arrests, assassination attempts and threats of suicide." An actress and a homemaker were called in to testify whether they were the Metropolitan's mistresses, while Chiricescu produced as evidence a letter in which Atanasie appeared to be asking for antivenereal medicine. Of those who retracted their testimony in a more visible way was Nifon Niculescu, who, as Bishop of the Lower Danube, also held a seat on the Synod itself. The press claimed that his change of heart was induced by a government sponsorship. On June 20, 1911, the Synod offered the parties a final chance to withdraw their accusations; both refused. The Synod also offered both bishops a chance to sign in their resignation and vacate their seats simultaneously. Prompted by Chiricescu, Safirin refused—he feared that Arion was setting a trap for him.

On June 24, the Synod deposed Safirin for the slanderous accusations he had brought against Metropolitan Atanasie. This outcome was impatiently expected, but largely predictable—days earlier, speculations on this topic had surfaced in Dimineața daily; the left-wing Facla discussed the trial as "a travesty". Nonetheless, a few days after, the Metropolitan handed in his resignation. Although he claimed to have acted on his distress with the scandal, speculation arose that he had pushed into it—either by the swinging political consensus or, more specifically, by Arion's resentment. By October, the laws on the election of bishops were rewritten in a non-controversial way: "metropolitans could be elected only from bishops, while bishops could be elected from any member of the Romanian clergy. [...] the conflict started by Bishop Gherasim Saffirin [...] indicated that there were people within the church unsatisfied with its role in society."

Initially, Safirin accepted the verdict against him, and withdrew to Roman, waiting for a replacement. His attitude changed, with Theodorian-Carada and Cernăianu insisting that he should put up passive resistance—the plan was that a sympathetic third-party, the Conservative-Democrats, would form government and restore him to his position. The deposed bishop then issued a statement against the Synod, noting that it had no authority to depose him without also anathematizing him. He also argued that, by virtue of Romanian laws, he was irremovable from his Senate seat, and therefore also from his bishop's seat. He sent a letter of protest to King Carol I, and made his position public in several brochures and collections of documents, some of which were still in print in 1912.

According to various accounts, the police was called in for a raid on his bishopric palace, and he was escorted out of Roman under armed guard. Theodorian-Carada claims that Safirin remained a bishop "for as long as he wanted", and only left by his own will, "because he was tired." According to a detailed account by the memoirist Constantin Bacalbașa, the prosecutor Anton Arion actually ordered Safirin to vacate the building, and negotiated with him over several hours, until the bishop conceded defeat. At roughly the same time, Chiricescu was sacked from his teachers' job, his denunciation deemed an act of blackmail.

In summer 1912, Safirin expatriated himself to Austria-Hungary, and lived at Brașov. His episcopal seat was taken by Calist Ialomițeanul (or Botoșăneanul), rumored to have been a client of the Conservative Party and a keeper of concubines. According to Cernăianu, Safirin was left without an income, "hungry and homeless", but, in 1913, was granted a pension under the fictive assumption that he had resigned his post willingly. Also in 1913, the Conservative-Democrat Take Ionescu, and a simple majority of the governing coalition, proposed to assign him the coveted Bishopric of Râmnic, but the entire Synod threatened to resign in protest. For his part, Safirin refused an offer coming from King Carol, to take over as Starets of a model monastery.

In early May 1914, Safirin returned to Roman alongside Cernăianu, and resumed a discreet existence as a translator of church literature from the Greek. He eventually withdrew to the area north of Băile Olănești, to Frăsinei Monastery (which he had refurbished during his time as bishop), and lived there for the rest of his life. He spent his final years composing psaltic music, and, still a student of church literature and hesychasm, obtained a typewritten copy of the Philokalia. The manuscript was later kept by Dumitru Stăniloae, and possibly used as reference for his own Philokalia edition.

Safirin died in early 1922. Bishop Visarion Puiu, who attended his vigil, claimed that he had "passed away like a holy man." He was buried on monastery grounds, and his grave was later visited by a repenting Atanasie. According to Sîrbu, his case remains in history as one of the few where a Romanian bishop openly attacked the Romanian government structures, thus testing the limits of a clergyman's political involvements. Theodorian-Carada described his friend, "Bishop Saffirinu", as "an all-too-zealous monk, with a mindset that was perhaps more Judaic than Christian, but nonetheless a man."
