= First Battle of Orsova =

- Part of the Romanian Campaign of World War I
Date	1–4 October 1916
Location	Orsova, Banat, Austria-Hungary (today in Romania)
Result	Romanian victory

Belligerents
Romania	Austria-Hungary; Germany

Commanders and leaders
(Kingdom of Romania) Ioan Culcer (Kingdom of Romania) Ion Dragalina	(Austria-Hungary) Arthur Arz von Straussenburg (Austria-Hungary) Alexander Ritter Szívó de Bunya

Units involved
1st Army: 1st Infantry Division	Austria-Hungary: 1st Army: 145th Infantry Brigade; Germany: 9th Army: 187th Division; 187th Regiment; III Battalion

Casualties and losses
Unknown	Unknown

The First Battle of Orsova was a World War I military engagement between Austro-Hungarian and German forces on one side and Romanian forces on the other side. The Central Powers failed to advance, the battle thus resulting in a Romanian victory.

== Background ==
Between 28 August and 4 September 1916, during the Battle of Orsova, the 1st Romanian Division (General Ion Dragalina) of the 1st Romanian Army (General Ioan Culcer) conquered the town of Orsova along with the west bank of the Cserna River from its Austro-Hungarian defenders: the 145th Brigade (Colonel Rudolf von Fiebich-Ripke) of the 1st Austro-Hungarian Army (General Arthur Arz von Straußenburg). On 5 September, the first German unit to arrive in nearby Transylvania - the 187th Regiment of the 187th Division - promptly rushed its III Battalion to Herkulesfürdő (Băile Herculane/Herkulesbad), one of the settlements taken by the Romanians on 1 September (another such settlement was Mehádia). The aim of the Central Powers was to secure the Iron Gates. The battle took place between 6 and 10 September. However, only on 6 September - the first day of the battle - did the Central Powers gain any ground. Their forces managed to secure Herkulesfürdő as well as Mehádia, but fell short of reaching Orsova. As early as 8 September, two days before the end of the battle, Vienna admitted that the Romanians had taken Orsova, five days after the town was seized. In October, the Central Powers forces at Orsova were under the command of Colonel Alexander Ritter Szívó de Bunya.

== Battle ==
The battle took place between 1 and 4 October 1916. It resulted in a Romanian victory, given that, by mid-October, Szívó's Orsova force was the only Central Powers unit that failed to advance.

== Aftermath ==
A mixed Austro-Hungarian and German force under the Hungarian Colonel Szívó had moved along the Cserna River in mid-November, during a general Central Powers offensive against Romania which started on 11 November, and captured parts of Orsova during fighting on 11–13 November.
