= Nicolae Dobrescu =

Romanian Orthodox theologian (1874 – 1914)

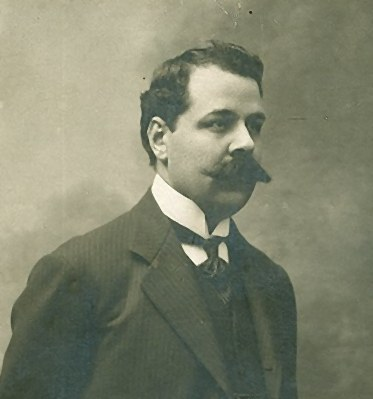
Nicolae Dobrescu

Nicolae Dobrescu (26 July 1874 – 10 July 1914) was a Romanian church historian and theologian within the Romanian Orthodox Church.

== Biography ==
He was born into a peasant family in Celeiu, Romanați County, a village later merged into Corabia town and located in the Oltenia region. His father was named Dobre D. Deaconu, and the surname Dobrescu was assigned to him at the village primary school. After finishing there, he attended the central seminary in the national capital Bucharest from 1888 to 1896. After graduating, he enrolled in two faculties at the University of Bucharest, theology and literature, completing both in 1902. His theology dissertation consisted of a Romanian translation of Octavius by Marcus Minucius Felix, preceded by a short biography and critical study. The same autumn, he won a scholarship to study abroad, with a particular focus on the history of the Romanian church. He selected the University of Vienna, where he attended the courses of Balkan and Byzantine historian Konstantin Josef Jireček, as well as of other historians and philologists. He also studied the history of Catholicism and Protestantism, and examined hundreds of archival documents related to the Romanian church. Dobrescu's thesis, written in German, health with the beginnings of church organization in the Danubian Principalities, and was well received by Jireček for its reliance on original documents of the Ecumenical Patriarchate. After receiving his doctorate in April 1905, he left for Czernowitz (Cernăuți), where he took courses in church history with Eusebiu Popovici at Czernowitz University's theology faculty. Using material from the faculty's library and other sources, he managed to re-edit his thesis and extend it back through the 11th century. Meanwhile, he wrote a study on Nicodim of Tismana and the church during the latter half of the 14th century. Also in 1905, he published a collection of prior articles in Budapest.

In autumn 1905, Dobrescu returned to Bucharest; this coincided with the establishment of a department of Romanian Orthodox Church history within the theology faculty. Along with Dobrescu, several reportedly unprepared candidates applied. A selection committee formed of bishops Gherasim Safirin, Sofronie Vulpescu and Nifon Niculescu recommended one Dumitru Stănescu for the post. The university senate disagreed, and named a new hiring committee. The latter excluded two candidates, including Stănescu, for not meeting the legal qualifications. Eventually, Religious Affairs and Public Instruction Minister Mihail Vlădescu granted the professorate to Dobrescu. In this decision, he took account of opinions expressed by the history faculty, foremost among them Nicolae Iorga. The initial hire, made in November 1906 – 1907 on a temporary basis, was made permanent in May 1907. In a lecture held later that year, Dobrescu explained that he proposed a systematic approach toward researching the history of Christianity in Romania, based on a critical analysis of sources and a search for historical truth. He announced that he would combine expository lectures with smaller seminars. As recounted by his departmental successor Niculae M. Popescu in 1954, Dobrescu divided his time between the department, the library and his office; his lectures were well prepared and read from carefully documented notes. The seminars involved paleography, document interpretation and reviews of new studies. He would spend mornings at the Romanian Academy Library and afternoons at the State Archives, putting together lectures in the evening. Additionally, he helped start a library for the new department. Although never ordained a priest, feeling he could better serve the church as a layman, he was a practicing Orthodox.

Dobrescu intended to write a century-by-century history of the Romanian church, a goal he partly achieved. A volume on the 14th century appeared in 1906, followed in 1907 by one on the early 15th century in Moldavia. In 1910, he managed to publish accounts of the entire 15th and 16th centuries; around the same time, he printed his course on the 16th through the 19th centuries. He had published the 19th century in 1905, followed in 1906 by a history of the church in Oltenia under Austrian rule, covering 1716–1739. Aware of the weak state of available textbooks, he published one for secondary school in 1912 and a more thorough one for seminary in 1913. The following year, shortly before his death, he managed to complete a textbook for seminarians on church history since the Great Schism. Both Popescu and Niculae Șerbănescu considered these the best in the field, but lamented that the reprints appearing through 1937 rarely mentioned their author's name, instead crediting a non-specialist. In December 1912, together with three other theologians, Dobrescu began publishing the bimonthly magazine Revista Ortodoxă, meant as a platform for presenting religious questions to the general public.

Aside from his departmental activity, Dobrescu held various conferences on church history that were open to the public, including at Iorga's summer university in Vălenii de Munte. He penned criticism of the manner in which bishops were elected, and his writings on canon history were used to draft a new law on the matter in 1909. In July 1911, he was made a full professor. The same year, he was elected a corresponding member of the Romanian Academy. In the autumn of 1913, he began feeling ill and missing courses, and cancer quickly weakened his formerly robust body. He died in tremendous pain the following July, shortly before he would have turned 40, and was buried in Bellu cemetery. His death was deplored by those who knew him, with an obituary penned by Iorga praising his "serious and fecund" education, regretting that "Romanian scholarship has lost one of the most prestigious representatives of its younger generation". In pursuance with his wishes, Dobrescu's personal library was donated to the church history department.
