= Cathedral of Saint Demetrius, Craiova =

Romanian Orthodox cathedral in Craiova, Romania

Coordinates: 44°18′54.61″N 23°47′31.03″E

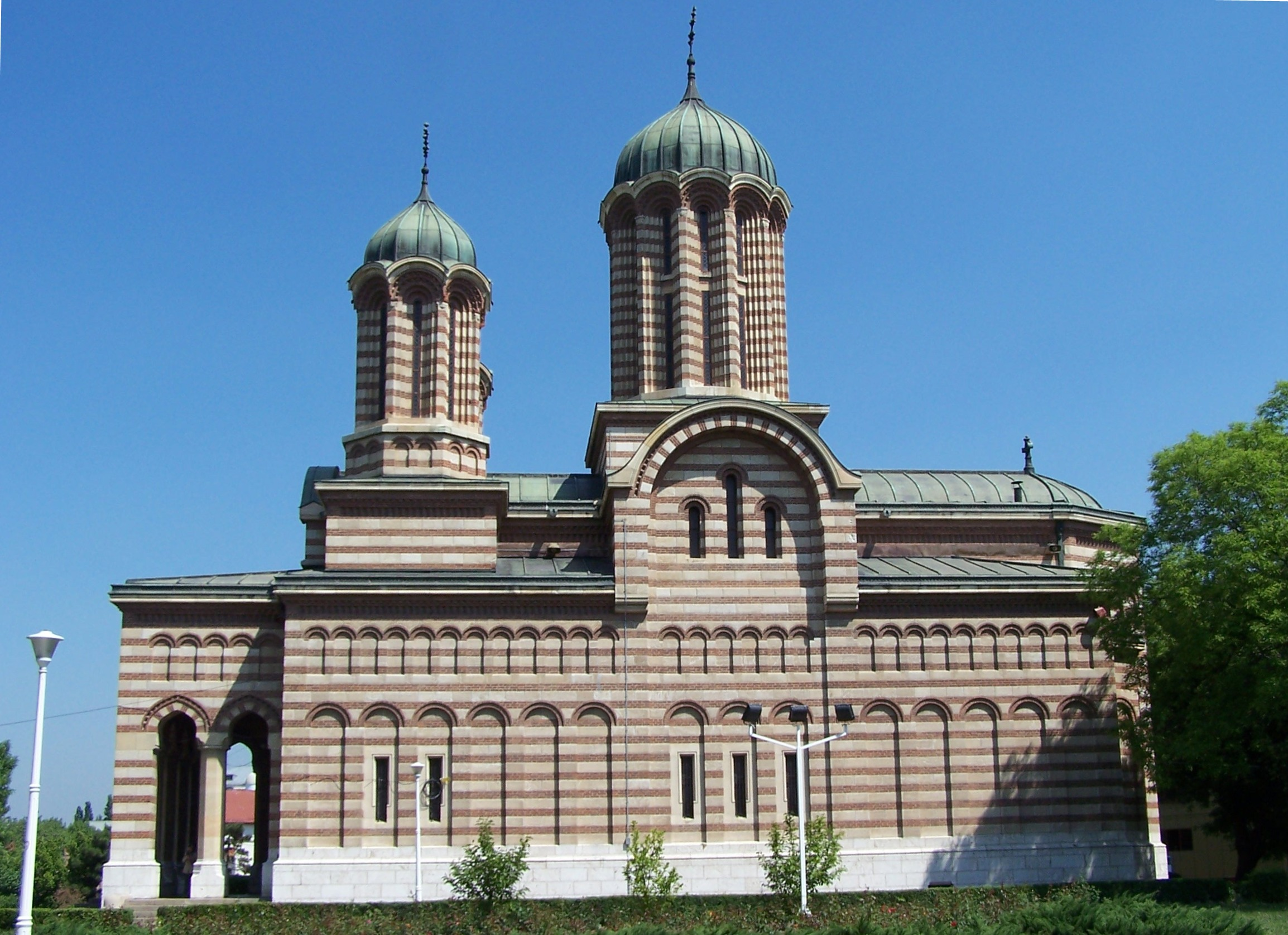
Cathedral of Saint Demetrius

The Cathedral of Saint Demetrius (Romanian: Catedrala Sfântului Dumitru) is a Romanian Orthodox cathedral, see of the Metropolis of Oltenia. It is located at 14 Matei Basarab Street, Craiova, Romania, in the historic region of Oltenia. There was likely a church on the site by the 1490s, renovated in 1651 and, having fallen into disrepair, demolished in 1889. That year, work on a new church began, and this was completed and sanctified in 1933. The earlier church's close proximity to the headquarters of the Ban of Craiova gave it importance in the city's political life, as well as a defensive purpose, while the modern building's role ensures its continued significance.

== First church ==
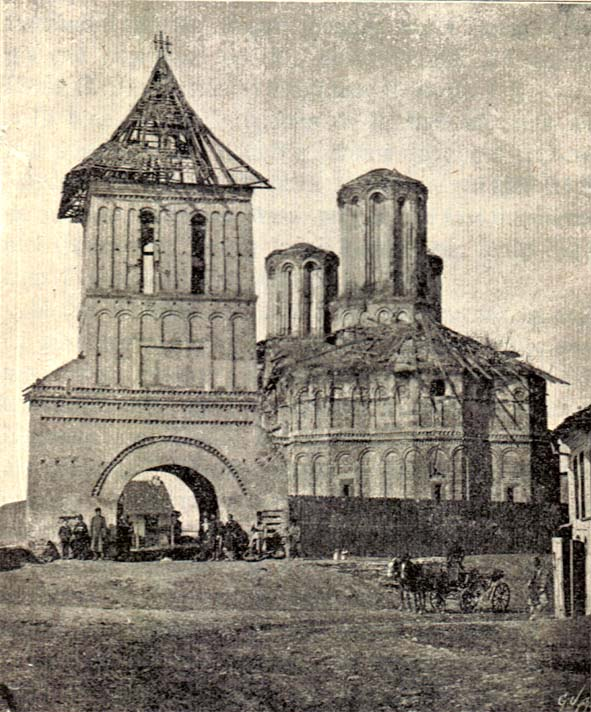
The first church prior to demolition

The first church on the site, the city's oldest, has been speculated as existing during the reigns of Peter and Ivan Asen I of Bulgaria (ca. 1185), of Ivan Asen II (ca. 1230) or of Mircea I of Wallachia (ca. 1400). Archaeological digs from 1888 suggest the presence of a church as early as the 8th or 9th centuries, while Petre Constantinescu-Iași proposed that Mircea built the church to honor his victory at the Battle of Rovine. However, the prevailing consensus is that it was built during the reign of Barbu Craioveanu, Ban of Craiova, in the 1490s. Dedicated to Saint Demetrius, it was also known as Băneasa, as the ban Barbu was its ktitor.

The church received generous donations from succeeding bans and was located in the vicinity of their residences. It was attended by the great boyars who lived nearby, also forming part of the city's defenses. Although Craiova was never surrounded by city walls, it nevertheless had a defensive system of which churches and monasteries formed a part. They tended to be built to the south and southwest, the only realistic approaches for an enemy. Looking out from the church, one can see a line of observation points toward the Vidin road and toward the Jiu River crossing points near Coşuna and Jitianu monasteries. In 1731, the authorities of the Habsburg monarchy then ruling Oltenia (the "Banat of Craiova") decided on a plan to fortify the church and its surroundings, but the plan was abandoned due to the opposition of military commander Francis Paul Anthony Wallis.

Another of the church's historic names has been Domnească ("Princely"), since its patrons the Craiovești supplied several of the Princes of Wallachia, including Neagoe Basarab (1512–1521), Matei Basarab (1632–1654) and Constantin Brâncoveanu (1688–1714). In 1651, Matei Basarab rebuilt the walls of the church. In 1657, Macarius III Ibn al-Za'im, Patriarch of Antioch, visited the church, accompanied by deacon Paul of Aleppo. The latter recorded: "We were met at the entrance into Craiova by the Ban of Oltenia, boyars and ordinary people. They led us to the great church of stone walled by the recent Prince Matei and dedicated to Saint Demetrius, which closely resembles the Princely Church. It is held up by four high pillars and has a bright and delightful appearance".

For several centuries, the church lay near the heart of the city's life, given the buildings in its proximity: the bans' residence, the Austrian administration, the building where visiting princes would stay and the headquarters of the local divan. Those who went to be judged by the divan usually took their oath in the church and signed its judicial decisions there. Often visited by the Bishops of Râmnic, it gradually took on the character of a bishop's church.

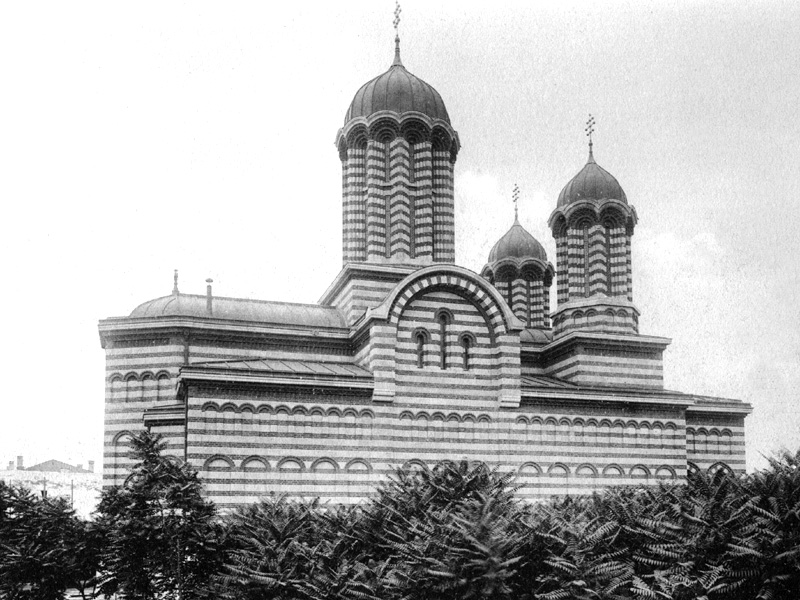
The second church in a photograph published 1901-1904

Over time, the building suffered damage, and was partly restored during the reign of Constantin Brâncoveanu. Flower-patterned stone borders and iron bars were added to the windows, as well as glass to the ground-level and cupola windows. (In general, Wallachian churches at the time had no glass in the windows.) By the early 19th century, the church was in a state of advanced degradation, many of its precious objects in private hands, and the bishops now using the Madona Dudu Church. The 1838 earthquake caused severe damage. A number of attempts to repair the church proved fruitless, and it was shut down in 1849, nearly forgotten.

== Second church ==
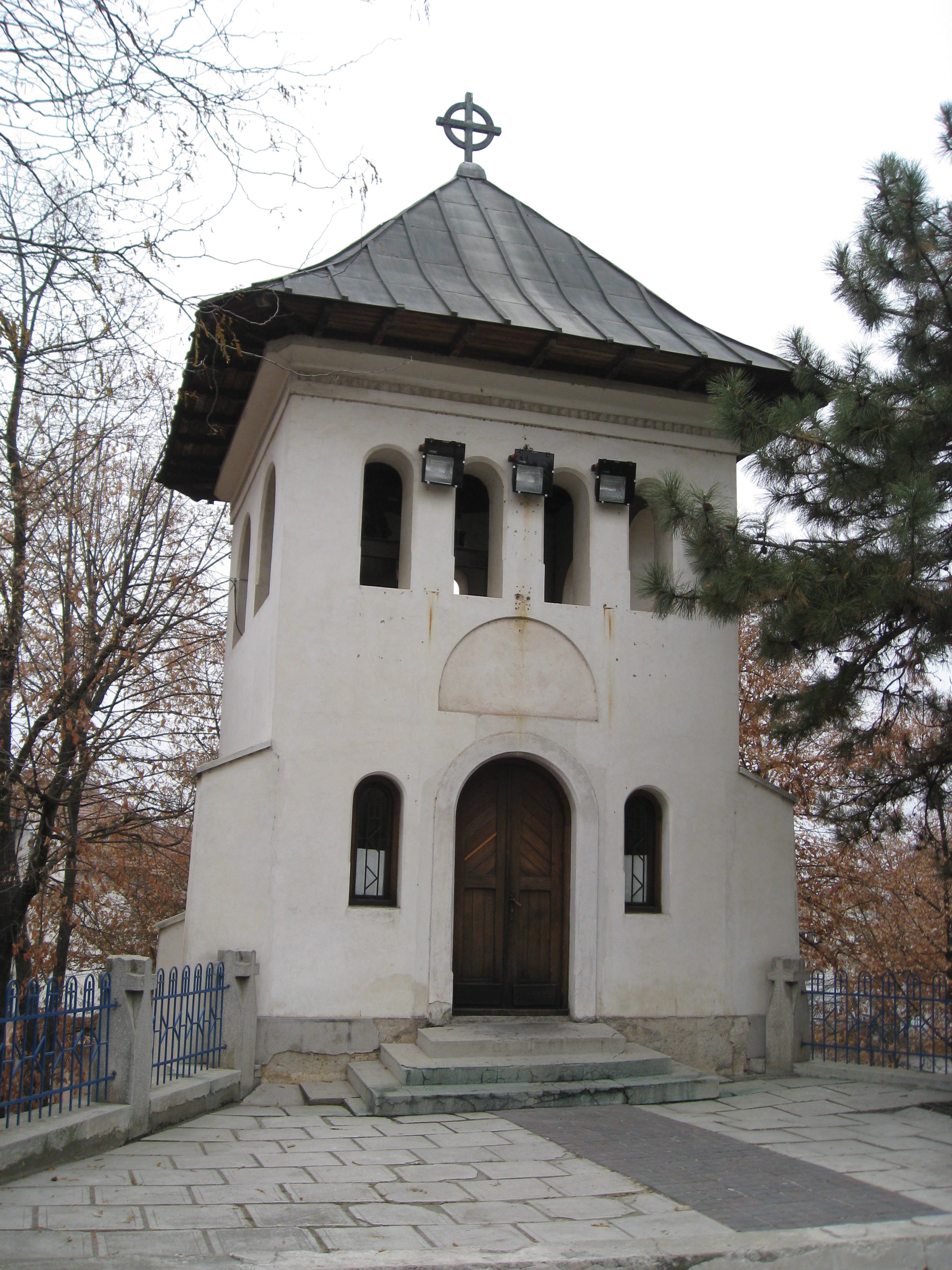
The bell tower

In 1889, the original church was completely torn down and rebuilt from the ground up in the Byzantine Revival style, in the form of an inscribed Greek cross. André Lecomte du Noüy was the architect, and the project was supported by King Carol and Queen Elisabeth.

The cornerstone was laid on October 12, 1889. The structure was in place by 1893, although the building was not completely finished and blessed until October 26, 1933. The interior painting was done by a pair of French artists between 1907 and 1933; the ornamental painting inside and on the porch by a German; and the iconostasis by a Târgu Jiu artist Iosif Keber.

The building became a metropolitan cathedral on March 25, 1939, when the Craiova Archdiocese was raised to the rank of Metropolis. In 1976, the interior painting was washed and brightened. The following year's earthquake caused damage that required the cathedral to be sanctified again in 1978 on the feast of Saint Demetrius, after a refurbishing. It houses relics of the following saints: Patriarch Nephon II of Constantinople, Sergius and Bacchus and Tatiana of Rome.

The bell tower is built of Roman bricks probably taken from Pelendava citadel. Bogdan Petriceicu Hasdeu, writing in 1884, called this the only surviving component of the original buildings, suggesting that the first church was dated to some two centuries before Matei Basarab's reconstruction in 1651. The inscription dating to his time does not mention any ktitor prior to him, implying that he was its original founder. According to Nicolae Iorga, Oltenia's oldest school for priests and readers functioned on the site.
