= Corabia Solar Park =

Large thin-film photovoltaic (PV) power system

- Country: Romania
- Location: Corabia, Olt County
- Coordinates: 43°46′25″N 24°30′12″E
- Status: Operational
- Commission date: December 2012
- Construction cost: €21 million

Solar farm
- Type: Photovoltaic

Power generation
- Units operational: 28602
- Nameplate capacity: 7 MW
- Annual net output: 8.5 GWh

The Corabia Solar Park, a large thin-film photovoltaic (PV) power system, is built on a 45 hectares (110 acres) plot of land near the Corabia commune in Olt County, Romania. It is located in the southern part of the country, 5.5 km from the Danube.

The Corabia Photovoltaic Park is the fifth MW solar park constructed by Renovatio. The solar park is a 7-megawatt solar power system using 28,602 solar panels of 245 Wp each of state-of-the-art thin film technology, and was completed in December 2012. The solar park is expected to supply 8,500 MWh of electricity per year. Construction began in March 2012 and was completed in December 2012.

Capacity:	7 MW.
Number of panels:	28602
Panel Capacity:	245 wp.
Electrical Connection:	T-Connection to a 20 kv line.
Location:	Olt County, Romania
Start of construction:	Q4 2012

The investment cost for the Corabia solar park was €21 million.

== See also ==
- Energy policy of the European Union
- Photovoltaics
- Renewable energy commercialization
- Renewable energy in the European Union
- Solar power in Romania
