= Nifon =

Nifon may refer to:

- A village in the commune of Hamcearca, Romania
- Nephon I of Constantinople, Ecumenical Patriarch of Constantinople, 1310–1314
- Niphon of Kafsokalyvia (1316–1411), Greek Orthodox saint and hermit
- Patriarch Niphon of Alexandria, Greek Patriarch of Alexandria, 1366–1385
- Nephon II of Constantinople, Ecumenical Patriarch of Constantinople, 1486–1488, 1497–1498, 1502
- Nifon Rusailă (1789–1875), Metropolitan of Ungro-Wallachia, 1850–1865, and first Metropolitan-Primate of Romania, 1865–1875
- Nifon Niculescu (1858–1923), Romanian Orthodox Bishop of the Lower Danube
- Nifon, an alternative form of Nippon (Japan)
