= Iosif Bobulescu =

Moldavian and Romanian bishop

Iosif Bobulescu (Romanian pronunciation: [ˈjosif bobuˈlesku]; born Ioan Bobulescu; December 15, 1818–December 15, 1890) was a Moldavian and Romanian bishop within the Romanian Orthodox Church.

Born in Burdujeni, Botoșani County, then a village near Suceava, Bobulescu attended primary school there, followed by the theological seminary at Socola Monastery in Iași, the capital of Moldavia. He graduated in 1845, married, and in March 1846 was ordained a priest and assigned to Saint Parascheva parish church in Botoșani. There, he taught catechism. In January 1856, he was named to a similar position at Iași, remaining until 1860. In 1857, after being a widower for several years, he became a monk, taking the name Iosif. In 1861, he was elevated to the rank of archimandrite and placed in charge of Saint Nicholas Princely Church. In January 1862, he was consecrated bishop, taking the title Sevastius. Between 1865 and 1872, he was among those who promoted autocephaly for the Romanian church. After 1872, he supervised a number of churches in Iași, and later became vicar of the Moldavia and Bukovina Metropolis, with the style Botoșăneanul. In November 1880, he was named Bishop of Râmnic. During his episcopate, Bobulescu repaired the walls of the cathedral's bell tower. In November 1886, he retired and withdrew to Botoșani, where he died four years later.
