= Tâmna =

- Commune
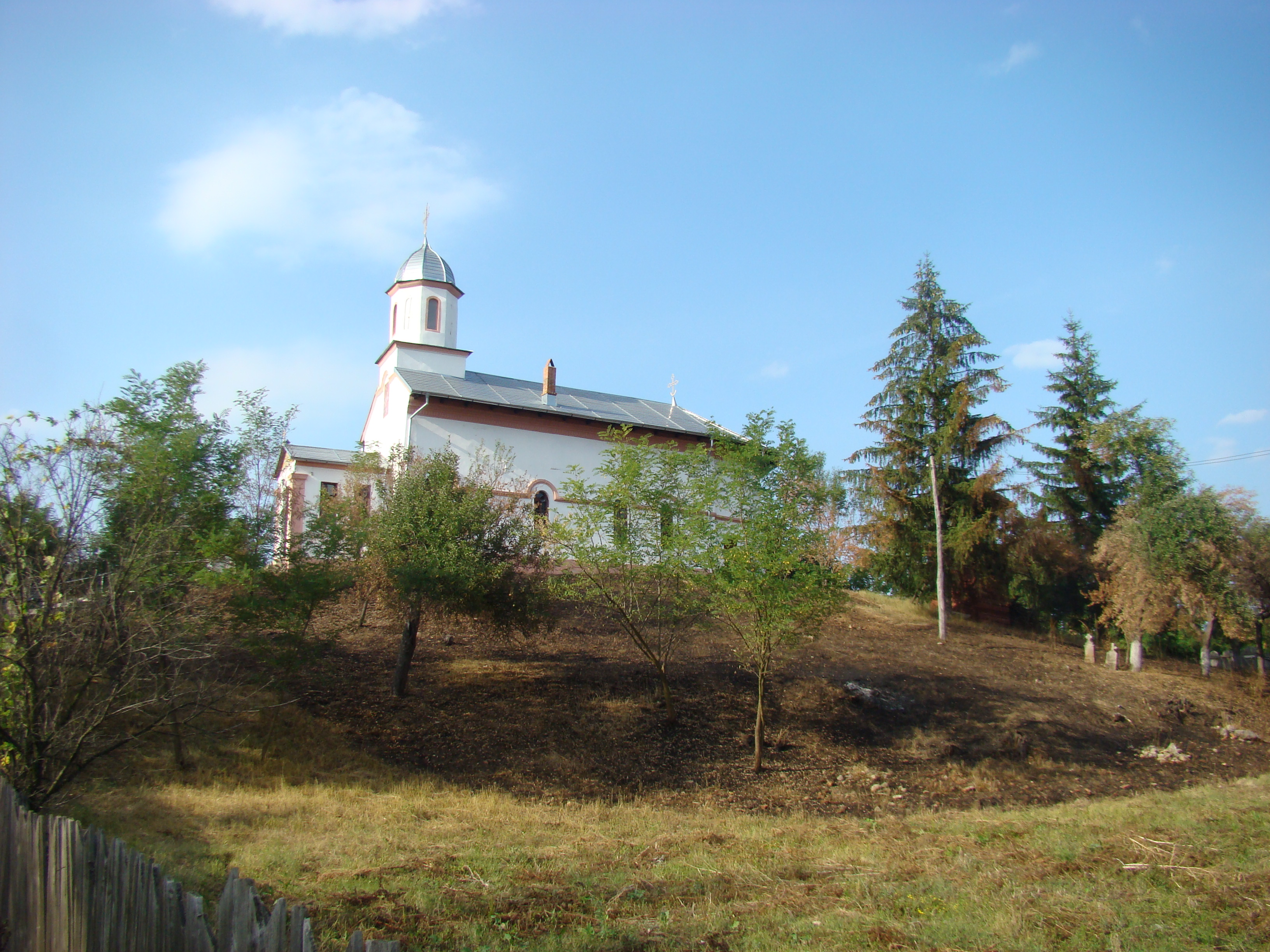
- Saint Nicholas Church in Tâmna

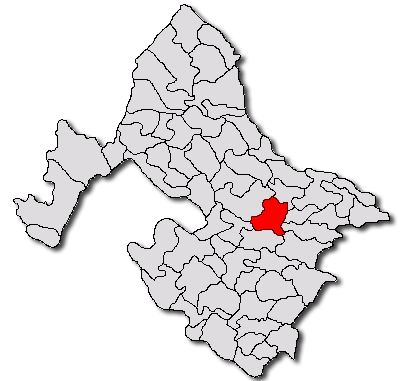
- Location in Mehedinți County

- Location in Romania
- Coordinates: 44°34′N 23°1′E
- Country: Romania
- County: Mehedinți

Government
  - Mayor (2024–2028): Daniel Ciocîrlan (PSD)
- Area: 92.05 km^{2} (35.54 sq mi)
- Elevation: 202 m (663 ft)
- Population (2021-12-01): 2,881
  - Density: 31.30/km^{2} (81.06/sq mi)
- Time zone: UTC+02:00 (EET)
  - Summer (DST): UTC+03:00 (EEST)
- Postal code: 227470
- Area code: +(40) 252
- Vehicle reg.: MH
- Website: primariatamna.ro

Tâmna is a commune located in Mehedinți County, Oltenia, Romania. It is composed of eleven villages: Adunații Teiului, Boceni, Colareț, Cremenea, Fața Cremenii, Izvorălu, Manu, Pavăț, Plopi, Tâmna, and Valea Ursului.

== Education ==
The commune has three elementary schools located at Izvorălu (I–VIII), Plopi (I–IV), and Valea Ursului (I–VIII). After graduating from the elementary panel, the local students continue their studies by either commuting to a nearby village, Strehaia, located 10 km away or moving to Craiova or Drobeta-Turnu Severin, the closest cities.

== Attractions ==
Tâmna is well known for the wooden church, certified now as a historical monument, located a few minutes away from the local Church. Surrounded by the Foaienfir forest, the beauty of the place is enriched by the farmer's market held every Friday morning, between 8 and 11 am. Last week of October, there is the annual local festival, where the locals gather and enjoy dances, music, carnivals and local foods. In addition to it, the Șerban Farm, located 200 m towards Bâcleș from the market can be visited. It holds hundreds of bovines (breeds like Angus and Belgian Blue), goats, sheep and pigs.

Historical population
Year	Pop.	±%
2002	3,715	—
2011	3,260	−12.2%
2021	2,881	−11.6%
Source: Census data

== Natives ==
- Gherasim Safirin (1849–1922), Romanian Orthodox prelate.
