= Tatiana of Rome =

3rd-century Roman Christian martyr

Saint Tatiana of Rome
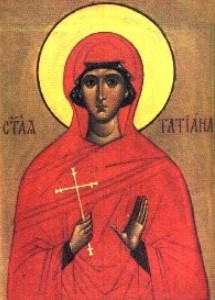
- Russian Orthodox icon of Saint Tatiana, 19th century

Virgin martyr
- Born: Rome
- Died: 226–235; Rome
- Venerated in: Catholic Church; Orthodox Church
- Canonized: Pre-Congregation
- Major shrine: Cathedral of Saint Demetrius, Craiova, Romania
- Feast: January 12
- Attributes: Shown holding a martyr's cross, or a plate with two eyes on it
- Patronage: students

Tatiana of Rome was a Christian Virgin and martyr in 3rd-century Rome during the reign of Emperor Severus Alexander.

== Biography ==
The narrative states that she was the daughter of a Roman civil servant who was secretly Christian, and raised his daughter in the faith. She became a deaconess in one of the Roman churches, tending the sick and helping the needy. One day she was arrested by the jurist Ulpian who attempted to force her to make a sacrifice to Apollo. While she prayed, an earthquake destroyed the Apollo statue and part of the temple.

Tatiana was then blinded, and beaten for two days, before being brought to a circus and thrown into the pit with a hungry lion. But the lion did not touch her and lay at her feet. She was then sentenced to death, and after being tortured, Tatiana was beheaded with a sword on January 12, around AD 225 or 230.

== Veneration ==
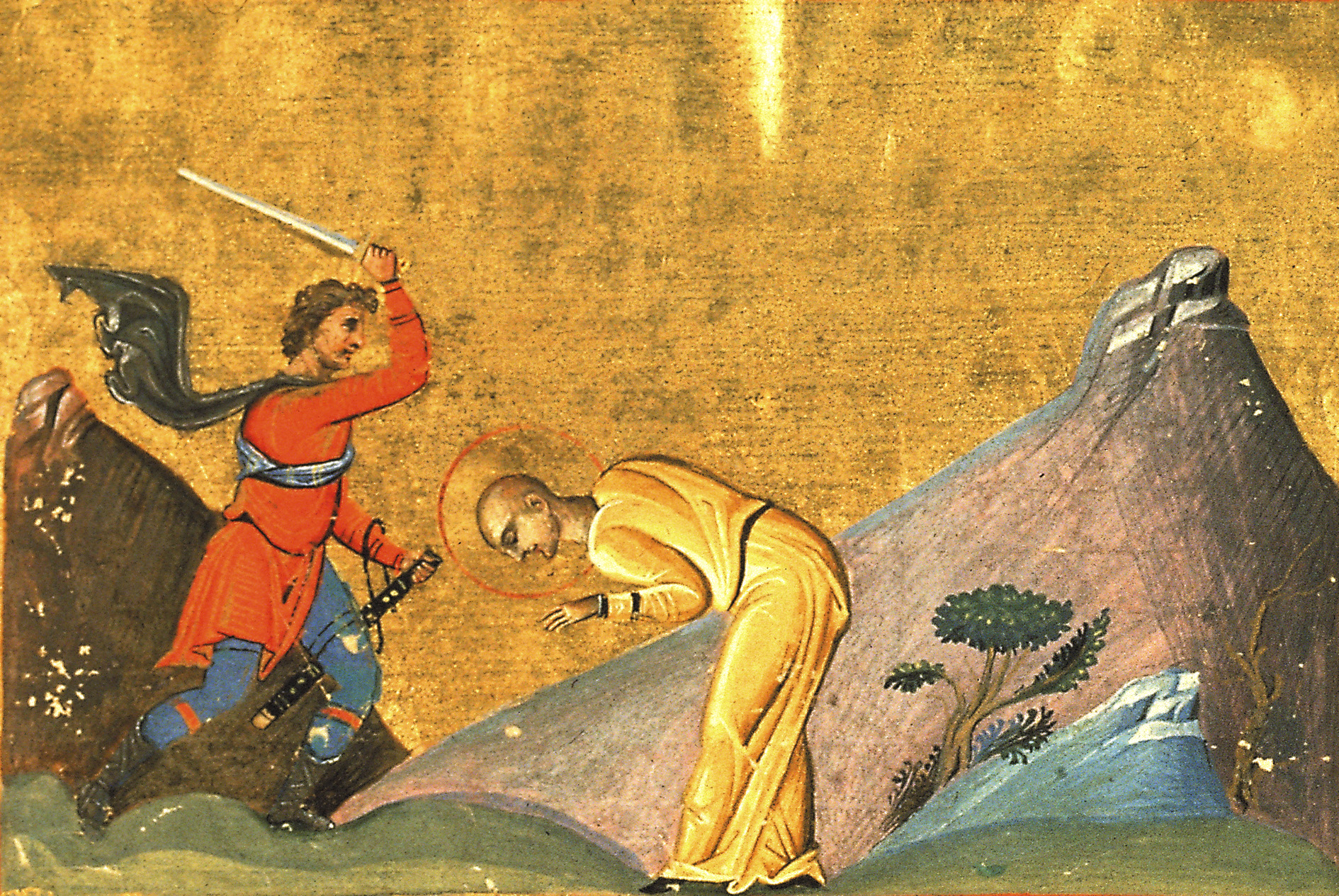
Painting showing the beheading of Tatiana of Rome from the Menologion of Basil II (c. 1000 AD)

Tatiana is venerated as a saint, and her feast day is on January 12 (for those churches which follow the traditional Julian Calendar, January 12 currently falls on January 25 of the Gregorian Calendar). The miracles performed by Tatiana are said to have converted many people to the fledgling religion. The relic of her skull was translated in 1955 from Bistrița Monastery to the Cathedral of Saint Demetrius in Craiova, Romania, and is enshrined with the relics of Saints Sergius and Bacchus and those of Patriarch Nephon II of Constantinople.

Tatiana is the patron saint of students. In Russia and Belarus, Tatiana Day is semi-formally celebrated as "students' day."

== Sources ==
- Attwater, Donald and Catherine Rachel John. The Penguin Dictionary of Saints. 3rd edition. New York: Penguin Books, 1993. ISBN 0-14-051312-4.
