= Metropolis of Oltenia =

The Metropolis of Oltenia (Romanian: Mitropolia Olteniei) is a metropolis of the Romanian Orthodox Church. Its see is the Archdiocese of Craiova; its suffragan dioceses are the Archdiocese of Râmnic and the dioceses of Severin and Strehaia and Slatina and Romanați. The headquarters is the Cathedral of Saint Demetrius in Craiova. Covering the historic region of Oltenia, it is the successor of the Metropolis of Severin, attested as of 1370 and located at Severin. After a short period, this entity was moved to Râmnic as the Diocese of Râmnic-Nou Severin. The modern metropolis was established in November 1939 and dissolved in April 1945, shortly after the imposition of a Romanian Communist Party-dominated government. In mid-1947, the Archdiocese of Craiova, covering western Oltenia, was created. In 1949, the archdiocese was elevated to the rank of metropolis.

== Metropolitan bishops ==
- Nifon Criveanu (December 1939 – April 1945)
- Firmilian Marin (December 1947 – October 1972)
- Teoctist Arăpașu (February 1973 – September 1977)
- Nestor Vornicescu (April 1978 – May 2000)
- Teofan Savu (October 2000 – June 2008)
- Irineu Popa (July 2008-)
