= Orsova Offensive =

WWI Romanian Campaign engagement

- Part of the Romanian Campaign of World War I
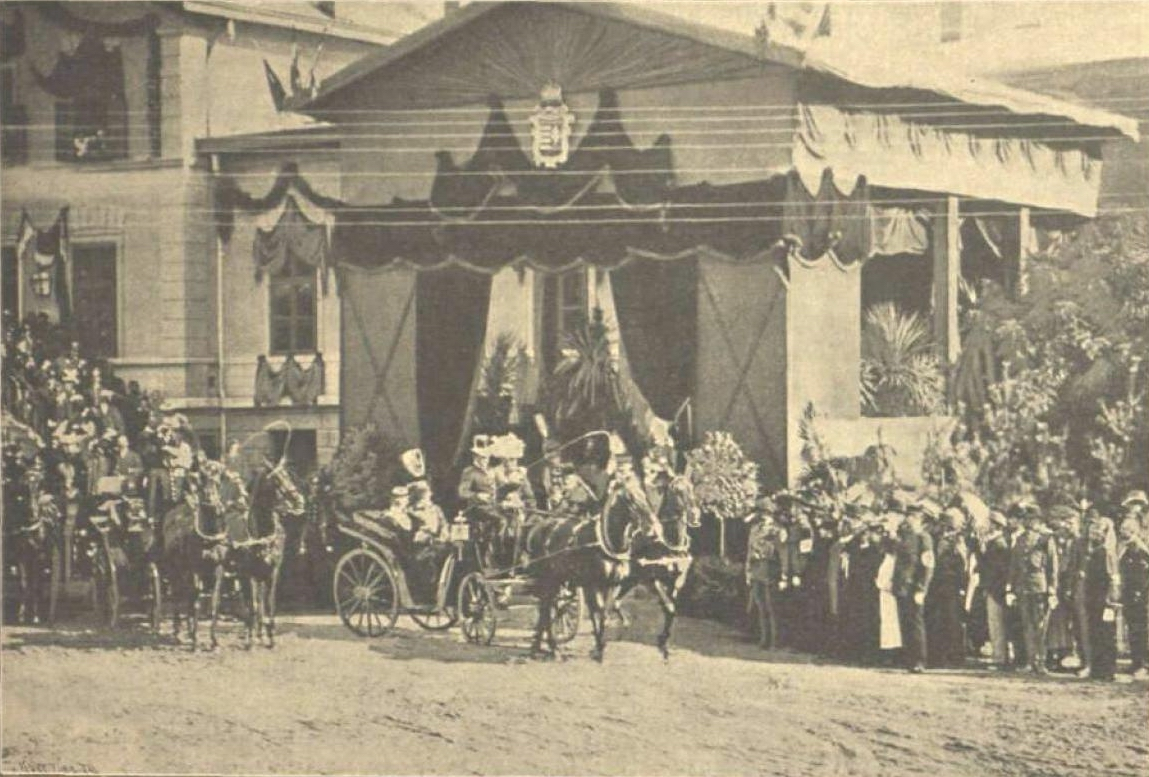
- Emperor Franz Joseph at the Orsova railway station (1896)
Date	28 August – 4 September 1916
Location	Orsova, Banat, Austria-Hungary (today in Romania)
Result	Romanian victory

Belligerents
Romania	Austria-Hungary

Commanders and leaders
(Kingdom of Romania) Ioan Culcer (Kingdom of Romania) Ion Dragalina	(Austria-Hungary) Arthur Arz von Straussenburg (Austria-Hungary) Rudolf von Fiebich-Ripke

Units involved
1st Army: 1st Infantry Division	1st Army: 145th Infantry Brigade; SMS Álmos

Casualties and losses
Unknown	Unknown; 25 tons of coal

The Orsova Offensive was a military engagement fought between the armies of Romania and Austria-Hungary at the start of the Romanian Campaign in August–September 1916. It ended in a Romanian victory which led to the Romanian occupation of the west bank of the Cserna (Cerna) River for over two months.

== Background ==
Romania launched its invasion of Transylvania on 27 August 1916. However, despite not being an actual part of Transylvania, the west bank of the Cserna had logistical importance, being the location of the city of Orsova (today Orșova), which was the end of a railroad as well as a port on the Danube. The Cserna River streamed from the Transylvanian Alps, forming the border between Romania and the Hungarian part of Austria-Hungary up to a point around 30 miles (48 km) north of Orsova, from where the border went south, overland, towards the Danube. The Romanian attack was carried out by the Romanian 1st Infantry Division, under General Ion Dragalina. The division was part of General Ioan Culcer's 1st Romanian Army. The 1st Division comprised seven infantry regiments, a force which reflected the importance of Dragalina's offensive. In reality, Orsova was rejected as a staging area by the Central Powers, due to its weak transportation links. Furthermore, the Romanians did not have to capture the town in order to deny its use to their enemy. It would have sufficed if the Romanians settled on capturing only the steep ridge east of Orsova, where their artillery could render the town uninhabitable. Opposed to the Romanian 1st Infantry Division was the Austro-Hungarian 145th Infantry Brigade, under Colonel Rudolf von Fiebich-Ripke. The brigade — part of General Arthur Arz von Straußenburg's 1st Army — had the equivalent strength of a regiment, consisting of three infantry battalions and one rear-area guard battalion, with three machine-gun sections, two batteries (31 artillery pieces) and the river monitor SMS Álmos. Despite being heavily outnumbered, Orsova's defenders benefited from the advantage provided by the steep ridge which ran north to south, named the Alion Height. It was a formidable barrier, and Fiebich-Ripke was well aware of this, as he had his units deployed along the ridge. Also, the Romanian 1st Division was isolated from the rest of the 1st Army.

== Battle ==
The battle started on the morning of 28 August, with a bombardment of Turnu Severin by the Álmos. The monitor had left Orsova at dawn, shelling harbor facilities, the rail yards, a cavalry barracks and some shipyards at Turnu Severin, where Dragalina's division had its headquarters. The Austrian warship fired almost 500 artillery rounds of 75 mm, as well as considerable machine gun fire. Returning upstream to Orsova, Álmos couldn't overcome the current until her crew threw 25 tons of coal overboard. In retaliation, the Romanians put Orsova under artillery fire that same day. The Romanian shelling was directed against the fortifications of Orsova, but it was indirect, as the Romanians fired across the Alion Mountain. Dragalina recognized the Alion Height, towering above the city on the east side of the Cserna's mouth, as the key to the Austro-Hungarian position. The Romanians launched a full-scale assault on 1 September, their numbers enabling them to take the Alion Height by the end of the day. A simultaneous diversionary attack to the north on that same day enabled the Romanians to capture Mehádia (today Mehadia) and Herkulesfürdő (today Băile Herculane). On 2 September, the Austro-Hungarians had to withdraw to the eastern bank of the Cserna, enabling the Romanians to occupy the entire range of hills which dominated Orsova. The Romanians entered Orsova itself on the following day. The Austro-Hungarians conducted a rear-guard action, but the Romanians forced the passage of the Cserna River and captured a few more heights. On 4 September, the Austro-Hungarians abandoned the entire west bank of the Cserna, retreating north of Mehádia. On 1 September, fighting also took place around Csernahévíz (the Hungarian name for Topleț).

== Aftermath ==
Although Orsova was taken by the Romanians on 3 September, Vienna only acknowledged this five days later, on the 8th, amidst a failed German-supported counterattack. A further attempt, in early October, was likewise to no avail.

Orsova was the primary objective of the third (northwestern) column of General Culcer's Romanian 1st Army. Thus, having reached Orsova, this force halted in accordance with the Romanian campaign plan. A convenient position had been gained at the narrow gates of the Danube for preventing all river traffic, but no advance of permanent strategic value could have been carried out by a single isolated division. On the Dobruja front, following the Romanian evacuation of Silistra on 8 September, the Romanians declared that this loss was completely offset by the capture of Orsova from the Austro-Hungarians.

Besides the 25 tons of coal abandoned by the Austrians, casualties and losses are unknown. A mixed Austro-Hungarian and German force under the Hungarian Colonel Szívó had moved along the Cserna River in mid-November, during a general Central Powers offensive against Romania which started on 11 November, and captured parts of Orsova during fighting on 11–13 November.
