= Battle of Herkulesfürdő =

1916 battle

- Part of the Romanian Campaign of World War I
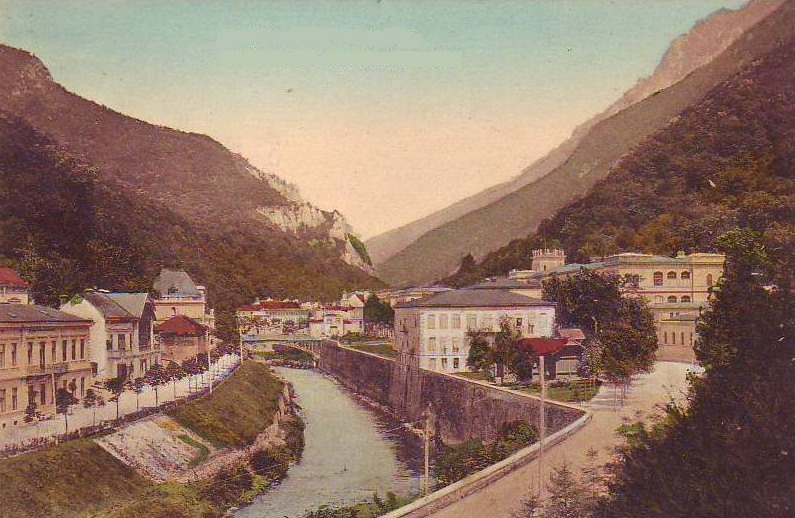
- Herkulesfürdő around 1900
Date	6–10 September 1916
Location	Herkulesfürdő, Banat, Austria-Hungary (today Băile Herculane, Romania)
Result	Romanian victory

Belligerents
Romania	Austria-Hungary; Germany

Commanders and leaders
(Kingdom of Romania) Ioan Culcer (Kingdom of Romania) Ion Dragalina	(Austria-Hungary) Arthur Arz von Straussenburg (6 – 8 September) (German Empire) Hermann von Staabs (8 – 10 September) (Austria-Hungary) Rudolf von Fiebich-Ripke

Units involved
1st Army: 1st Infantry Division	1st Army/XXXIX Reserve Corps: 145th Infantry Brigade; 187th Division; 187th Regiment; III Battalion

Casualties and losses
Unknown	Unknown

The Battle of Herkulesfürdő was a military engagement during the Romanian Campaign of World War I. It was fought between Romanian forces on one side and Central Powers forces (Austria-Hungary and Germany) on the other side. It resulted in a Romanian victory.

== Background ==
The Kingdom of Romania declared war on Austria-Hungary on 27 August 1916. On the following day, the Battle of Orsova commenced, the Romanians managing to secure the Danube port-town as well as the western bank of the Cserna (Cerna) River and a few other settlements by 4 September. In this sector of the front, the 1st Division (General Ion Dragalina) of the Romanian 1st Army (General Ioan Culcer) fought against the 145th Brigade (Colonel Rudolf von Fiebich-Ripke) of the Austro-Hungarian 1st Army (General Arthur Arz von Straußenburg). On 5 September, the first German unit to arrive in nearby Transylvania – the 187th Regiment of the 187th Division – promptly rushed its III Battalion to Herkulesfürdő (Băile Herculane/Herkulesbad), one of the settlements taken by the Romanian forces on 1 September (another such settlement was Mehádia). The aim of the Central Powers was to secure the Iron Gates.

== Battle ==
The battle took place between 6 and 10 September. However, only on 6 September — the first day of the battle — did the Central Powers gain any ground. Their forces managed to secure Herkulesfürdő as well as Mehádia, but fell short of reaching Orsova. Orsova was the location of the Iron Gates, and securing the Iron Gates was the objective of the Central Powers. As early as 8 September, two days before the end of the battle, Vienna admitted that the Romanians had taken Orsova, five days after the town was seized. Also on 8 September, the XXXIX Corps of German General Hermann von Staabs assumed responsibility for operations in southern Transylvania. The units placed under the command of von Staabs included the covering troops at Mehádia.

== Aftermath ==
A mixed Austro-Hungarian and German force under the Hungarian Colonel Szívó had moved along the Cserna River in mid-November, during a general Central Powers offensive against Romania which started on 11 November, and captured parts of Orsova during fighting on 11–13 November.
