= Archdiocese of Roman and Bacău =

Archdiosese in the Romanian Orthodox Church

Archdiocese of Roman and Bacău Arhiepiscopia Romanului și Bacăului
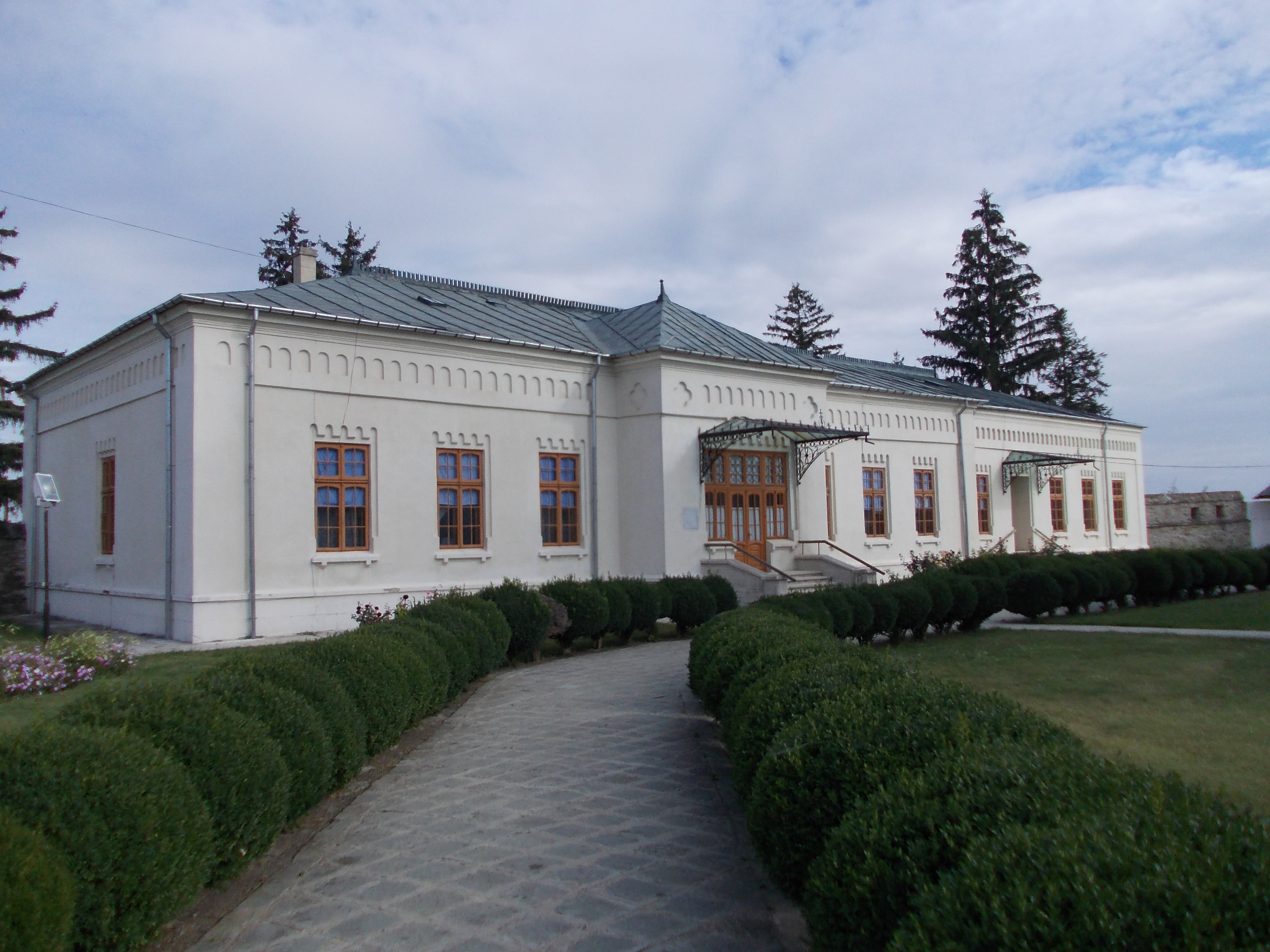

Location
- Country: Romania
- Territory: Bacău County and part of Neamț County
- Ecclesiastical province: Metropolis of Moldavia and Bukovina
- Headquarters: Roman
- Denomination: Romanian Orthodox Church

The Archdiocese of Roman and Bacău (Romanian: Arhiepiscopia Romanului și Bacăului) is a diocese (eparchy) of the Romanian Orthodox Church, headquartered in Roman, with canonical jurisdiction in Neamț County and Bacău County, which is part of the Metropolis of Moldavia and Bukovina. The head of this archdiocese is I.P.S. Ioachim Băcăuanul who was elected on December 16, 2014, by the Synod of the Romanian Orthodox Church, by secret ballot, with 35 votes out of 45 validly cast votes.

The Diocese of Roman and Bacău was elevated to the rank of Archbishopric on September 13, 2009.
