= Ion Dragalina =

Romanian general

Ioan Dragalina
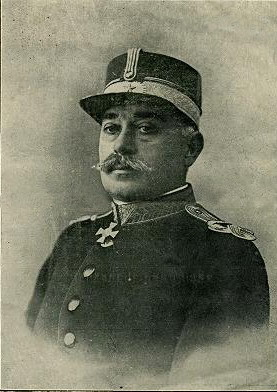
- Born: December 16, 1860; Karansebesch, Austrian Empire (now Caransebeș, Romania)
- Died: November 9, 1916 (aged 55); Bucharest, Kingdom of Romania
- Burial place: Bellu Cemetery, Bucharest
- Education: Theresian Military Academy
- Spouse: Elena Giurginca (m. 1886)
- Children: Corneliu, Virgiliu, Aurora, Elena, Cornelia, Viorica
- Military career
- Allegiance: Kingdom of Romania
- Branch: Royal Romanian Army
- Service years: 1887–1916
- Rank: General
- Commands: 1st Army
- Conflicts: World War I; Romanian Campaign; Battle of Orsova; First Battle of the Jiu Valley
- Awards: Order of the Star of Romania, 1st class Order of the Crown, 4th class Order of Michael the Brave, 3rd class

Ioan Dragalina (16 December 1860 – 9 November 1916) was a Romanian general who died during World War I in the First Battle of the Jiu Valley.

== Education and early life ==
Dragalina was born in the city of Karansebesch (now Caransebeș, Romania), which at the time was part of the Austrian Empire. He was a descendant of a military family. His father, Alexandru Dragalina, served as an officer in the Austro-Hungarian Army until his resignation in 1859. His parents moved to Romania, where his father was appointed administrator of the border region. However, Marta Lazaroni, his mother, wanted to give birth in her ancestral home and thus the family returned to Karansebesch, where in 1860 Ion, the first of their four sons, was born.

Dragalina went to primary school in his native city and then to military school in Temesvár (Timișoara). He continued his studies at the Military Academy in Vienna (1884) and joined the Austro-Hungarian Army. While at the Military Academy, he enrolled and graduated from the School of Geodetic Engineering. In 1886, he married Elena Giurginca. They had six children: two sons (Corneliu – born in 1887, and Virgiliu – born in 1890) and four daughters (Aurora, Elena, Cornelia, and Viorica).

Like his father, Dragalina graduated from the Wiener Neustadt Military Academy, where he specialized in geodetic engineering. Dragalina served as a lieutenant in the Line Regiment No. 43, which was headquartered in Karánsebes. During the Hungarian parliamentary elections of 1884, two candidates were competing in Boksánbánya (Bocșa): the would-be Hungarian Prime Minister István Tisza and the lawyer Coriolan Brediceanu of the Romanian National Party. Lieutenant Dragalina was in command of the troops assigned with maintaining order during the elections. Dragalina refused the instructions of the local civil authorities: to allow only the voters supporting the Hungarian candidate to pass. In response, Dragalina was publicly humiliated to the point of demanding satisfaction. Dragalina officially reported this to his superiors, and on 1 December 1887 he resigned from the Austro-Hungarian Army.

== Career in the Romanian Army ==
On 1 December 1887, Dragalina resigned from the Austro-Hungarian Army and moved to Romania where he joined the Romanian Army ten days later, retaining his rank of Lieutenant. Thanks to the skills and qualifications he had acquired in Austria-Hungary, Dragalina embarked upon a successful military career in Romania. As Captain Dragalina, he served under then-Colonel Constantin Prezan, a Romanian General during the First World War who eulogized him in 1936: "to his teachings I owe the tactics and strategy and all I knew and applied during the war and as Chief of the General Staff".

He advanced through the ranks becoming captain in 1892, major in 1899, and lieutenant-colonel in 1908. Between 1908 and 1911, lieutenant-colonel Dragalina was the commander of the Military Infantry School in Bucharest. For his work in developing the scientific curriculum and for the order and discipline instilled in the military education system, Ioan Dragalina was made a member of the Order of the Star of Romania, First class.

In April 1911, Colonel Dragalina took over the command of the 34th Regiment in Constanța. During this time, he was made a member of the Order of the Crown, Fourth Class. In 1915 he was promoted to Brigadier General and had under his command the Third Territorial Commandment.

During the years of Romania's neutrality, Dragalina worked on fortifications in the Prahova Valley.

== World War I ==
In 1916, prior to Romania entering the First World War on the side of the Allied Forces, Dragalina was named commander of the First Infantry Division, stationed at Turnu Severin. His troops patrolled a very large area on the western border, extending from the sources of the Argeș River to the city of Calafat.

=== Capture of Orsova ===
The Romanian 1st Division—part of General Ioan Culcer's 1st Army—took the Austro-Hungarian town of Orsova (Orșova) in the Banat region on 4 September. The division was commanded by General Ioan Dragalina. The battle started on the morning of 28 August, with a bombardment of Turnu Severin by the Álmos. The monitor had left Orsova at dawn, shelling harbor facilities, the rail yards, a cavalry barracks and some shipyards at Turnu Severin, where Dragalina's division had its headquarters. The Austrian warship fired almost 500 artillery rounds of 75 mm, as well as considerable machine gun fire. Returning upstream to Orsova, Álmos couldn't overcome the current until her crew threw 25 tons of coal overboard. In retaliation, the Romanians under Dragalina put Orsova under artillery fire around noon on that day. Dragalina recognized the Alion Height, towering above the city on the east side of the Cerna's mouth, as the key to the Austrian position. The Romanians launched a full-scale assault on 1 September, their numbers enabling them to take the Alion Height by the end of the day. A simultaneous diversionary attack to the north on that same day enabled the Romanians to capture Mehádia (today Mehadia) and Herkulesfürdő (today Băile Herculane). The Austro-Hungarians conducted a rear-guard action, but lost Orsova along with the west bank of the Cerna on 4 September, retreating north of Mehádia.

=== First Battle of the Jiu Valley ===
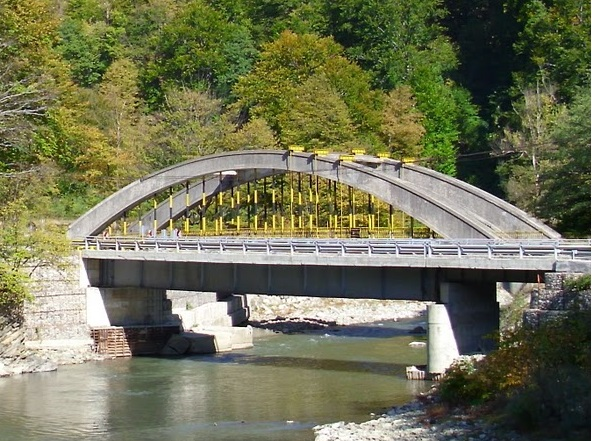
Lainici bridge

In late October, a massive German and Austro-Hungarian offensive was launched in the Jiu Valley under the command of General Paul von Kneußl. On 24 October 1916, General Dragalina was summoned to Craiova and ordered to take over the command of the First Army. He decided to fight Kneußl in the mountains and called upon his Romanian soldiers:

"Officers and soldiers of the First Romanian Army, from this moment on I am at the helm of the army and demand from all of you, from General to the last soldier: first that you defend with your life the sacred ground of our fatherland, our ancestral home, our land and the honor of the Romanian name. I demand from all of you total discipline and the strictest execution of orders. The troop which cannot advance should die fighting."

Early on the morning of 25 October 1916 General Dragalina left by car for the Jiu Valley, accompanied by two officers – Colonel Toma Dumitrescu and Major Constantin Militiade. He wanted personally to assess the situation on the front and reconnect with his military leaders, since phone lines were out of order. He reached the outposts of the first line of defense close to the Lainici Monastery. He stopped there to confess and take communion. While crossing the narrow Lainici bridge on his way back, the car was caught in machine gun cross fire. Speeding under a hail of bullets, his driver managed to cross the bridge, but the general was hit in his left upper arm and scapula.

Dragalina was urgently transported to the medical outpost at Gura Sadului, where the wound was disinfected and his arm was bandaged. From Gura Sadului he was transported to Târgu Jiu and that very same day to Craiova, where doctors recommended amputation. However, a telegram from Military Headquarters in Bucharest ordered his urgent transfer by train to the Military Hospital at the Royal Palace in Bucharest. The tedious and long trip delayed his arrival (the train arrived in Bucharest on the evening of 13 October) and his wound became infected. In Bucharest, doctors disinfected the wound, extracted the bullet from his scapula, and set his arm in a cast. His son, captain Corneliu Dragalina, himself wounded on the Dobruja front, came back to be at his bedside.

On his hospital bed, King Ferdinand I conferred upon him the Order of Michael the Brave. On 16 October 1916 his left arm was amputated. His condition began to ameliorate, but then sepsis set in. He died on the evening of 9 November 1916.

Memorial services were held at Biserica Albă in Bucharest. In attendance were King Ferdinand and Prince Carol (the future King Carol II) as well as many political personalities: Ion I.C. Brătianu (Prime-Minister of Romania), Vintilă Brătianu (War Minister), the writer Barbu Ștefănescu Delavrancea, Mihai Cantacuzino (Justice Minister), Take Ionescu (Minister of Foreign Affairs), Henry Catargi (Marshal of the Royal Palace), generals and foreign military attachés in Romania. He was laid to rest in the Heroes' Cemetery (Bellu Military Cemetery) in Bucharest.

== Legacy ==
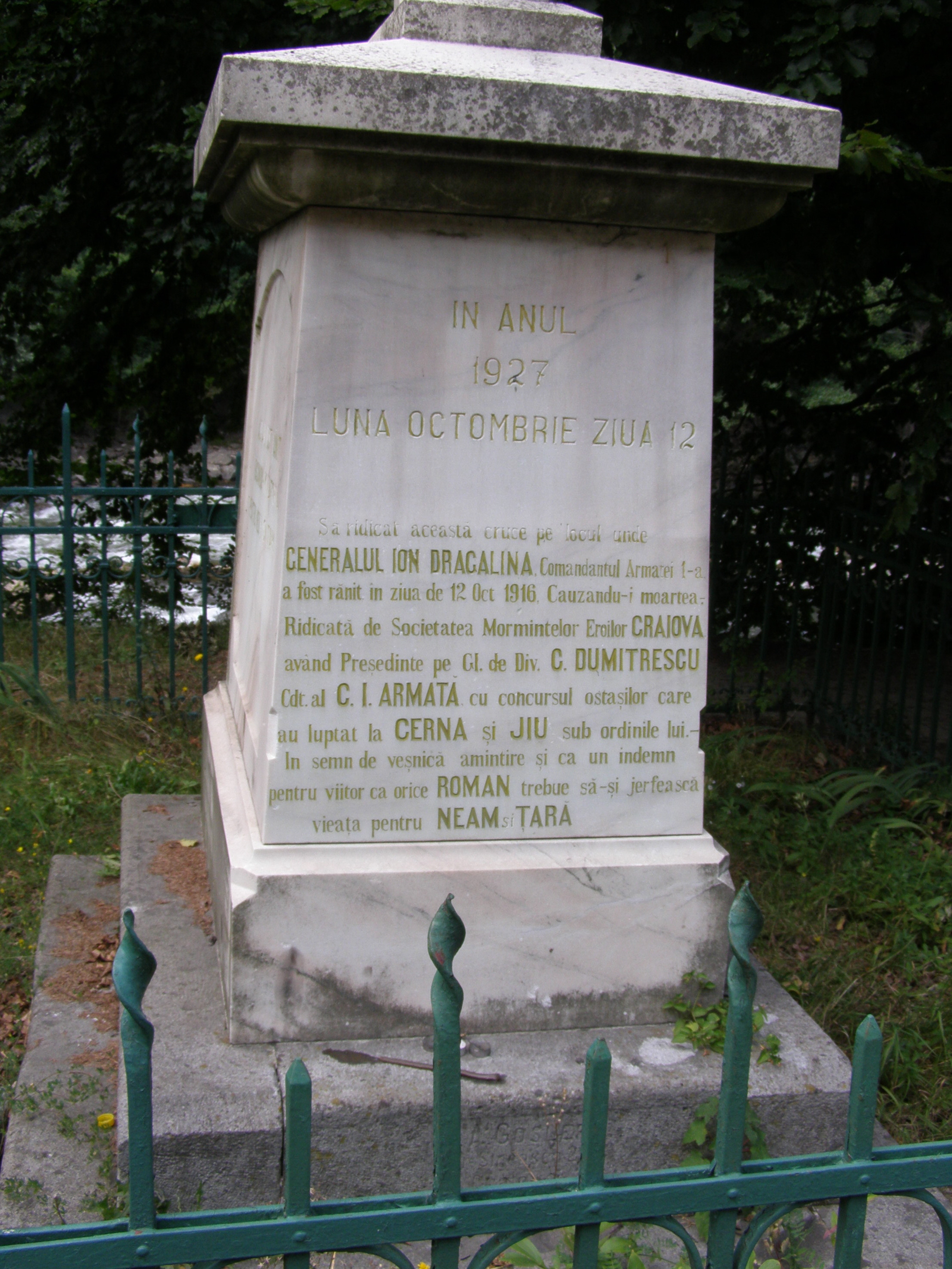
Site where Dragalina was wounded

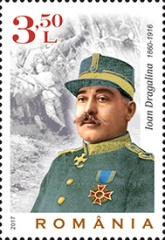
Postage stamp from 2017 (Scott #7303)

Although he was in command of the 1st Army for only one day (24–25 October 1916), it is General Dragalina who is credited with the Romanian success at the Jiu Valley, the most conspicuous Romanian victory of the 1916 campaign, given that it was achieved against forces superior in both numbers and artillery. Dragalina had inferior numbers and no reserves, but addressed the issue of his numerically inferior forces by borrowing detachments from two nearby groups. Although he was wounded in action and replaced as commander of the 1st Army on 25 October, his dispositions — made with great tactical skill — ensured the success of the Romanian counterattack which began on 27 October, and lasted as late as 1 November.

As a tribute to his heroism, several monuments were erected. Among these:

- A memorial in the Jiu gorge near the spot where General Dragalina was wounded, erected on 12 October 1927.
- A bronze statue was placed in front of the military barracks, in the Park General Ioan Dragalina in Caransebeș. The statue is the work of Mihai Onofrei and was unveiled on 3 June 1943. (It is included on the List of Historical Monuments of the Caraș-Severin County, code CS-III-m-B-11239).
- A bronze bust in the city of Lugoj by Spiridon Georgescu (also included in the List of Historical Monuments, Timiș County, code TM-III-m-B-06322).
- A bronze bust on a marble pedestal in front of the Mausoleum of Mărășești by Iulian Coruț in 1993.

A commemorative plaque was placed on the wall of the house of General Dragalina in Caransebeș (Ardealului Street, No. 6). Many streets, schools, and geographical places were also named after him.

To honor his memory, a village in Călărași County was named Dragalina in 1924. A high school in Oravița also bears his name.

In 2017, Poșta Română issued a 3.50 lei stamp in his honor, part of the "Eternal Glory to the First World War Heroes" series, which also includes Generals David Praporgescu and Radu R. Rosetti.

== Private life ==
General Ioan Dragalina was the father of the Romanian general Corneliu Dragalina (1887–1949) also born in Caransebeș, and of the Navy Commodore Virgil-Alexandru Dragalina.
