= Archdiocese of Râmnic =

Romanian Orthodox archdiocese

Archdiocese of Râmnic Arhiepiscopia Râmnicului

Location
- Country: Romania
- Territory: Vâlcea County
- Ecclesiastical province: Metropolis of Oltenia
- Headquarters: Râmnicu Vâlcea

Statistics
- Area: 5,765 km^{2} (2,226 sq mi)
- Population: Total: (as of 2011); 355,320
- Parishes: 320

Information
- Denomination: Romanian Orthodox
- Rite: Byzantine Rite
- Established: 1503-1504
- Cathedral: Cathedral of Saint Nicholas

Current leadership
- Archbishop: Varsanufie Gogescu; Archbishop of Râmnic
- Auxiliary Bishops: Emilian Lovișteanul

Map
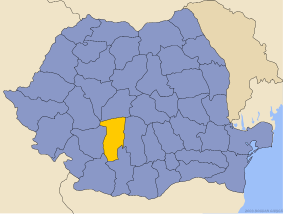

Website
- arhiram.ro

The Archdiocese of Râmnic (Romanian: Arhiepiscopia Râmnicului) is a Romanian Orthodox archdiocese based in Râmnicu Vâlcea (or Râmnic), Romania, in the historic region of Oltenia, and covering Vâlcea County. Established in 1503–1504, although with a bishop residing there from the previous century, it is a continuation of the medieval Metropolis of Severin. Initially covering all of Oltenia, it saw a flourishing cultural and religious output during the 16th to 18th centuries, both in the see and in the monasteries of the region. The area of the diocese began to fall in 1939, reaching its current proportions in 2008, a year before it became an archdiocese.

== History ==
=== Beginnings ===
The first Romanian metropolis, the Metropolis of Ungro-Wallachia, was created in 1359, followed in 1370 by the Metropolis of Severin west of the Olt River. Due to incursions by the Kingdom of Hungary, it was moved in 1375 from Severin to Strehaia in Oltenia, by then part of the Wallachian principality. It reached Râmnic at some point after the death of Wallachian Prince Mircea I in 1418. When Severin returned to Wallachian jurisdiction, the Oltenia diocese was re-established under the name of Râmnic New Severin in 1503–1504, during the reign of Radu IV the Great. It was established in memory of the former metropolis, the cathedral church of which was located on the site of the present cathedral. The diocese covered all of Oltenia and was directly subordinate to the Metropolis of Ungro-Wallachia.

Due to a scarcity of documents, it cannot be said with certainty who the diocese's bishops were during its first two decades. One group of historians points to Maksim Branković, a Serbian monk, probably named by Radu due to his good relations with the Serbian Despotate. Another group points to Macarie, starets of the Bistrița Monastery. This establishment was maintained by the Craiovești boyars, in whose interest it was to place an ally as bishop. Later, Neagoe Basarab, a former pupil at the monastery, would elevate Macarie to the Wallachia Metropolis, establishing a tradition wherein the leading candidate (willing or not) for the highest churchly office in the country would come from Râmnic, the bishops of which would be regarded as the second highest ranked clerics within the synod, behind the metropolitan. Including Macarie, three bishops of Râmnic went on to be elected metropolitan in the 16th century, three in the 17th and four in the 18th. Clearer records begin with Bishop Leontie, believed to have served between 1532 and 1534. Some forty bishops have led the diocese, including Anthim the Iberian, the city's patron saint, and Calinic of Cernica, who rebuilt the bishop's residence.

After its foundation, the diocese became the center around which the region's cultural and spiritual life gravitated. This took place in close cooperation with parish churches and with Bistrița and Cozia monasteries, whence many of the bishops were drawn. During the 16th to 18th centuries, the diocese supported the policies of the Wallachian Princes, many of whom were linked to it through judicial functions, church establishments, granting of privileges and military campaigns: Radu IV, Radu of Afumați, Mircea the Shepherd, Pătrașcu cel Bun, Michael the Brave, Radu Șerban, Matei Basarab and Constantin Brâncoveanu.

=== 16th to 18th centuries ===
==== Politics and architecture ====
The diocese's early development has been characterized as follows: the 16th century involved founding and consolidating; the 17th, acquiring a distinct identity and beginning its contributions to the national culture; and the 18th was its time of great contributions to Romanian culture and spirituality, leading Nicolae Iorga to speak of Râmnic as the typographers' capital and others to evoke a "golden age" for the town and the diocese during this century. Led by Bishop Climent, this flowering continued even after the destruction caused by the Austro–Turkish War in 1737, and can be divided into four stages: Brâncovenesc, post-Brâncovenesc, the age of Bishop Chesarie (per Iorga) and the premodern period.

Some six areas of activity have been identified whereby the diocese enriched spiritual and cultural life in the town, in Oltenia and in Wallachia as a whole. First, its officials were involved in public life through their presence at judgements, their offering of special liturgies and their presence in diplomatic delegations. Examples of the latter include Bishop Damaschin Voinescu's 1717 trip to the Imperial Court at Vienna, which decorated him; Bishop Climent's peacemaking initiative between the Turks and the Austrians in 1738; and Bishop Chesarie's presence in the 1776 Romanian delegation to Catherine the Great, after he had written a book on the Russo-Turkish wars.

Second, new churches were built and others restored, with the help of ktitori—Princes, officials, hierarchs, monks, merchants, etc. Thus, at least nine monasteries were established in the area, and nine churches in the city. Of these, the churches from the 15th and 16th centuries were either a simple nave with no bell tower or had the trefoil cross plan of Cozia Monastery. The ones from the 17th century followed the native Wallachian style adopted under Matei Basarab's reign, while those of the 18th century show many Brâncovenesc characteristics, including a balcony.

==== Education and arts ====
Third, monastic schools were established at Cozia, Bistrița, Govora and in Râmnic itself. These trained copyists, secretaries, logothetes, teachers, painters and cantors, many of whom would later join the princely court and administration. Among the more noteworthy is Teodosie Rudeanu, who became Great Logothete to Michael the Brave and wrote a chronicle of his activities during 1593–1597. Too, Vlad the Grammarian and Alexander the Teacher, brought from Bistrița at the end of the 17th century by Bishop Ilarion, copying several important books under his guidance and heading his school. The greatest number of scholars from the monastic schools appeared during the 18th century.

Education at Râmnic evolved as follows from the 16th to the early 19th century. During the 16th century, there was a bishop's school for cantors, with musical texts in Old Church Slavonic. It also trained copyists, grammarians and logothetes, who learned to read and write in the Romanian Cyrillic alphabet. In the 17th century, the bishop's school taught reading and writing in Slavonic; arithmetic, geometry and the basics of chronology and administration; and church music in Slavonic. In the 18th century, there was a Romanian school founded by Bishop Anthim (1705–1708). This was free, training priests, cantors and grammarians from the diocese and from Transylvania. After a break, it resumed in 1719, following the start of Austrian occupation over the region, under Bishop Damaschin (1708–1725). In 1726, a textbook of his, including prayers, liturgical texts and church music, was printed posthumously, followed in 1749 under Bishop Grigorie Socoteanu by a spelling book. The latter's well-developed structure was emulated in later editions at Iași, Vienna, Blaj, Sibiu, Buda and Cernăuți. From 1741 to 1755, there was a Slavonic school, established to counter Greek influence in the church. This was absorbed into the Romanian and Greek school, begun in 1746. Several of this school's graduates, such as Naum Râmniceanu, were authors during the premodern period of Romanian literature. Finally, during the 19th century (1800–1831), there was a Romanian school characterized by a certain amount of variation in curriculum and teachers' pay, unsurprising given the transitions of the period.

Fourth, the diocese made contributions to the development of Romanian religious art during more than four centuries, including the period when the Severin Metropolis was located at Râmnic. In terms of religious architecture, this evolved in the area from peasant models to distinct church forms to the integration of an Athonite trefoil style and its local permutations, followed by the development of an indigenous architecture under Matei Basarab, then the flowering of the Brâncovenesc style followed, in the 18th century, by its extension into Baroque, Mannerist and rural trends.

Mural painting, taught in church schools, also flourished, evolving over the centuries from the Byzantine-style symbolic works of the 14th century to more realistic depictions, especially in the 18th. While paintings in church naves remained in harmony with canon law, artists adopted realistic forms in the vestibules, where the ktitori were depicted. Starting in the 18th century, the painters, trained in different locations but living in Râmnic, organized themselves into a guild to defend themselves against administrative abuses. At the same time, Bishop Filaret asked them to remain mindful of the church canons.

Finally, the church singers' schools attached to the larger monasteries and to the cathedral, which trained future priests and deacons, including from Transylvania, played an important role in developing medieval music in the Romanian lands. New songs appeared from the beginning of the 15th century, written by Filothei, a monk from Cozia and former logothete to Mircea I. There was also progress on translating liturgical music into Romanian. Until Anthim was bishop, music was taught in Slavonic, but beginning then, and especially after the publication of two works in 1713–1714, the liturgy was taught in Romanian. There is evidence that the process began somewhat earlier, as by 1706–1708, a number of services were already being presented in Romanian. After 1713, bishops would print religious books exclusively in Romanian, also sending them to Transylvania, Moldavia and south of the Danube. The music teachers were well-educated men who spent time copying or, in the 18th century, printing musical manuscripts in Slavonic (until 1713) and Romanian (subsequently). Some of them also composed religious music of their own.

==== Printing and emerging national identity ====
Fifth, at a time when the country was emerging from the medieval period and was faced with the spread of Catholic and Protestant ideas, the diocese promoted the printed word as a means of enshrining Orthodox identity and unity of belief. Between 1508 and 1512, during the reigns of Radu IV, Mihnea cel Rău and Neagoe Basarab, three books appeared in Romanian at Bistrița Monastery: a service book, a Psalter and a Gospel book. Between 1636 and 1642, six religious books appeared at Govora Monastery, among them a rule book. There, a religious and cultural school operated, among its students being typographers. This was promoted by Metropolitan Teofil, a former bishop of Râmnic, supported by Prince Matei Basarab and his logothete Udriște Năsturel. In 1705, after becoming bishop, Anthim brought with him a printing press from Snagov Monastery, establishing a printing center in Râmnic and publishing nine or ten religious books by 1707. Their importance lies in the fact that with their completion, most Orthodox sacred texts had now appeared in Romanian, advancing the process of making the liturgical language a vernacular one and legitimizing Romanian as a sacred language, a process begun by Coresi, Dosoftei and Mitrofan of Buzău and continued through further translations by his successor Bishop Damaschin. As part of their political and cultural strategy, Constantin Brâncoveanu and Metropolitan Teodosie disseminated Anthim's texts to Romanians in Transylvania, subject to official attempts to convert them to Western Christianity.

In the 18th century, the bishops of Râmnic, witnessing two decades of Austrian domination and a number of Austro-Turkish confrontations in Oltenia, visibly acquired a national identity and a feeling of cultural, linguistic and religious cohesion with other Romanians. This helps explain why in their town more than in the national capital Bucharest, where Ottoman pressures and the financial interests of Phanariote Princes and dignitaries restricted such sentiments, printing activity in Romanian was done with the intention of aiding the popular masses, and why in spite of the difficulties involved, they strove to preserve traditional cultural and spiritual ties to areas inhabited by Romanians. With this goal in mind, they took care to print the most needed religious texts in the best translations, to present and comment on them in careful prefaces, to promote notions of spiritual, religious, cultural and political unity and to enrich a literary Romanian language with a basis in liturgical use. Each of the ten bishops involved (as well as Galaction, after 1800) had his own particular merits shaped by the context within which he operated. While the writing of Anthim, defrocked and assassinated, were forbidden, those of Damaschin took on his literary and liturgical prestige. Chesarie, although only bishop for a short while, had original ideas on Romanian history, accounting for Iorga's appreciation.

The 18th century bishops were sustained in their efforts by scholars, who both translated and corrected texts. In turn, a number of typographers assisted their efforts, including a printing dynasty founded by Athanasie Popovici Râmniceanul and several who also worked in Blaj, Sibiu and Bucharest. When Iorga referred to the town as a typographers' capital, he took into account the quantity and quality of religious and didactic works that appeared; their wide distribution in the three historic Romanian provinces as well as south of the Danube and on Mount Athos; the large number of scholars and proofreaders, but especially of talented printers, who handed down their craft from father to son and were sought out to work in other centers of learning. It was there that Ienăchiță Văcărescu published the first edition of his signature volume of grammar in 1787; that books for the Slavonic-language Serbian schools established by the Metropolitanate of Karlovci appeared in the mid-18th century; and that a religious book in modern Bulgarian appeared in 1806 at the request of the exiled bishop Sophronius of Vratsa.

Sixth, the bishops played an important role in the life of the church in Wallachia, given the high position established within the synod for them by Neagoe Basarab, which often propelled them into the role of metropolitan. During the 17th and 18th centuries, the diocese and its monasteries shaped a series of memorable clerics, both bishops and starets.

=== 19th to 21st centuries ===
The decades between 1780 and 1830 feature several characteristics at Râmnic. The traditions of spiritual, cultural and artistic life were continued, with war-damaged churches repaired and new ones built in a manner that balanced a post-Brâncovenesc style with folk art innovations. The monasteries and the diocesan center continued to educate calligraphers, copyists, miniaturists, painters and musicians. The diocesan printing press was continued, albeit with difficulties and interruptions. Bishop Filaret, after being elected metropolitan, took the printing instruments with him to use at Bucharest. His successor Nectarie rebuilt the press, turning out twenty books, including a collection of sermons in Bulgarian for that country's believers; he followed as metropolitan in 1812. Galaction (1812–1824) published few books, but these were important, including a re-edited alphabet book in 1814 and a book on the miracles of the Virgin Mary in 1820. Neofit, who took over in 1824, sold the press to a group of laymen. (The current press dates to the time of Bishop Vartolomeu (1920–1938).) Bishop Calinic (1850–1868), whose reign coincided with the formation of the modern Romanian state, was the diocese's pre-eminent leader during the 19th century; his successors did not rise to the same spiritual level and were privy to the definitive imposition of government authority upon the church. Calinic set up his own press and published a number of liturgical and spiritual books, including a lamentation in verse, a collection of advice for monks and a chronicle on the Wallachian uprising of 1821. He also disseminated word of the government order replacing Greek with Romanian for liturgical use. Finally, local writers began to look beyond the confines of the diocese, dealing with themes of national interest and making themselves known in the Romanian cultural and literary scene of the day.

With the establishment of the Metropolis of Oltenia in 1939 and the Archdiocese of Craiova in 1946, the diocese was left with only Vâlcea and Romanați counties in its jurisdiction. In 1949, under the new Communist regime, it was merged with the Argeș Diocese to form the Diocese of Râmnic and Argeș, headquartered at Râmnic and covering the counties of Vâlcea, Argeș, Olt and part of Teleorman. In 1990, after the fall of the regime, the Argeș and Muscel Diocese was re-established, leaving Râmnic in charge of Vâlcea and Olt counties. In the period that followed, the bulk of the diocese's monasteries and churches underwent restoration. Since 2008, with the establishment of the Diocese of Slatina, only Vâlcea County has remained as part of the diocese's territory. In 2009, it was raised to the rank of archdiocese.

== Dimensions ==
The archdiocese is divided into three districts: Râmnicu Vâlcea (130 parishes), Drăgășani (101 parishes) and Horezu (89 parishes). It runs religious education in schools, spiritual assistance in hospitals, military chapels and religious activities in orphanages and nursing homes. It publishes a magazine, Renașterea ("Rebirth"). It also runs a theological seminary with a five-year program for high school-aged students, founded in 1837 and shut down under Communism between 1948 and 1990. Some two dozen monasteries and sketes fall under its administration, nearly all of them classified as historic monuments. At Romania's 2011 census, 351,900 residents of Vâlcea County stated they were Orthodox, representing 99% of the county's population.

The see of the archdiocese is the Cathedral of Saint Nicholas, built in its current form between 1851 and 1856.

== Bishops ==
According to the archdiocese's reckoning, the following men have served as bishop at Râmnic:

Ilarion
Ioasaf
Iosif
Prohor
Grigorie I
Grigorie II
Sava
Onufrie
Daniil
Luca
Eftimie
Leontie, 1532? - 1534(?)
Paisie, 1535(?)/1540 - (?)
Eftimie, 1558(?) - 1568(?)
Mihai II, 1568(?) - 1586
Efrem I, 1586(?) - 1593(?)
Partenie I, 1594
Teofil I, 1595-1601(?)
Efrem II, 1601(?) - 1613
Dionisie I, 1615 - 1618(?)
Teofil II, 1619 - 1636
Ignatius the Serb, 1636 - 1653
Dionisie II, 1653 - 1657(?)
Ignatius the Greek, 1659 - 1668
Serafim, 1668 - 1670
Varlaam, 1670 - 1672
Ștefan I, 1673 - 1693
Ilarion II, 1693 - 1705
Anthim the Iberian, 1705 - 1708
Damaschin Voinescu, 1708 - 1725
Ștefan II, 1726 - 1727
Inochentie, 1728 - 1735
Climent, 1735 - 1749
Grigorie III Socoteanu, 1749 - 1764
Partenie II, 1764 - 1771
Chesarie, 1773 - 1780
Filaret, 1780 - 1792
Nectarie, 1792 - 1812
Galaction, 1813 - 1824
Neofit, 1824 - 1840
Nifon, 1840 - 1850
Calinic, 1850 - 1868
Inochentie, 1869 - 1873
Atanasie Stoenescu, 1873 - 1880
Iosif Bobulescu, 1880 - 1886
Ghenadie Enăceanu, 1886 - 1898
Atanasie Mironescu, 1898 - 1909
Ghenadie Georgescu, 1909 - 1912
Sofronie Vulpescu, 1913 - 1918
Meletie Dobrescu, 1918
Antim Petrescu, 1918 - 1919
Alexie Șerban, 1919 - 1920
Vartolomeu Stănescu, 1920 - 1938
Irineu Mihălcescu, 1938 - 1939
Iosif Gafton, 1943 - 1984
Gherasim Cristea, 1984 - 2014
Varsanufie Gogescu, 2014-
