= Dimitrie Dan =

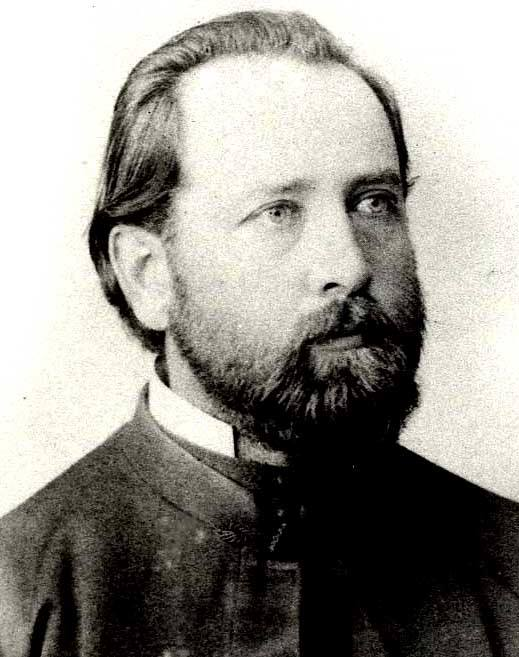

Dimitrie Dan (October 8, 1856—May 25, 1927) was an Austro-Hungarian-born Romanian historian, folklorist and Romanian Orthodox priest.

Born in Suceava, his parents were Nicolae and Domnica Dan. From 1864 to 1868, he attended a Romanian primary school at Saint John the New Monastery. This was followed, from 1868 to 1876, by the Greek-Orthodox Gymnasium in his native town. From 1876 to 1880, he studied at the theology faculty of Czernowitz University. Ordained a priest in 1881, he served at Iujineț (1881-1890), Lujeni (1890-1896), Straja (1896-1916) and Mahala. He received a distinction from the Romanian Orthodox Church in 1897, and between 1905 and 1923 attained various honors as a priest. In March 1904, he was elected a corresponding member of the Romanian Academy. In late 1918, he took part in the Romanian National Council and in the congress that voted for the union of Bukovina with Romania.

Dan contributed to various publications: Junimea literară, Aurora română, Candela, Deșteptarea, Timpul, Gazeta Bucovinei, Amicul familiei. He wrote articles and studies of church history, ethnography and linguistics. He published historic documents, reports, poems and folklore studies. He also wrote in Hungarian, German and Ruthenian. He was part of the collective authorship of the 1898 monograph Die Bukowina. He studied the habits of various nationalities: Armenians, Roma, Ruthenians and Jews, publishing a series of works on the topic. He received the academy's Năsturel Grand Prize in 1924. He died in Cernăuți.
