= Corabia =

- Town
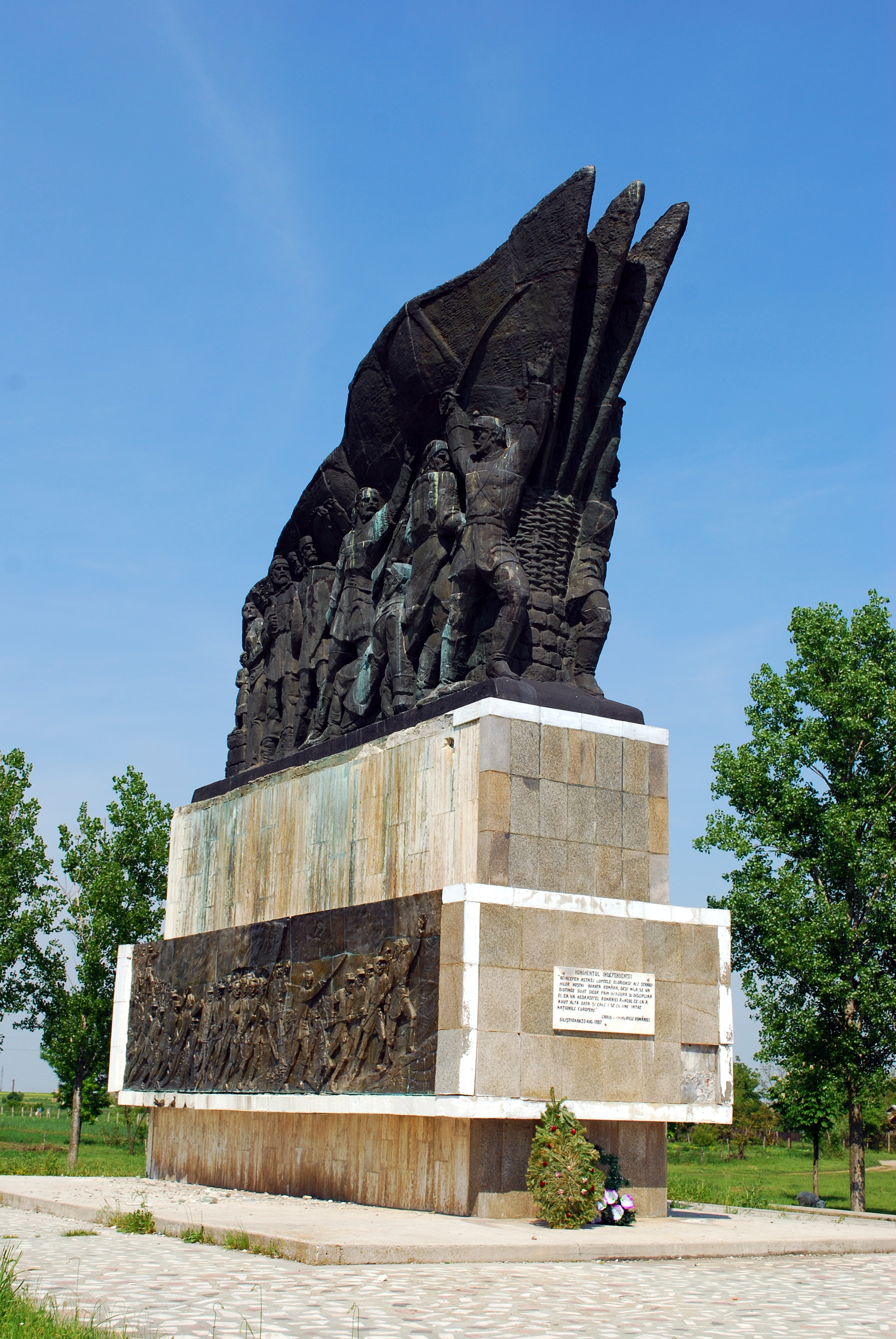
- Romanian War of Independence memorial in Corabia

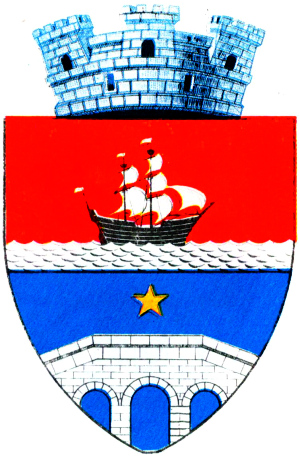
- Coat of arms

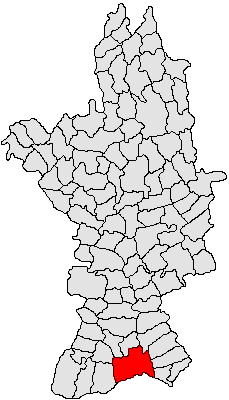
- Location in Olt County

- Location in Romania
- Coordinates: 43°46′25″N 24°30′12″E
- Country: Romania
- County: Olt

Government
  - Mayor (2024–2028): Iulică Oane (PSD)
- Area: 123.19 km^{2} (47.56 sq mi)
- Elevation: 35 m (115 ft)
- Population (2021-12-01): 13,527
  - Density: 109.81/km^{2} (284.40/sq mi)
- Time zone: UTC+02:00 (EET)
  - Summer (DST): UTC+03:00 (EEST)
- Postal code: 235300
- Vehicle reg.: OT
- Website: www.primariacorabia.ro

Corabia (Romanian pronunciation: [koˈrabi.a]) is a small Danube port located in Olt County, Oltenia, Romania, which used to be part of the now-dissolved Romanați County before World War II. Across the Danube from Corabia lies the Bulgarian village of Gigen.

== History ==
Historical population
Year	Pop.	±%
1912	9,124	—
1930	8,857	−2.9%
1948	10,772	+21.6%
1956	11,502	+6.8%
1966	14,502	+26.1%
1977	19,705	+35.9%
1992	22,386	+13.6%
2002	21,932	−2.0%
2011	16,441	−25.0%
2021	13,527	−17.7%
Source: Census data

Beneath Corabia, around the former village of Celei, lie the remains of Sucidava, an ancient Dacian and Daco-Roman town and fortress. Near the town, Emperor Constantine the Great built the longest European bridge over the Danube (2,437 m (7,995 ft)). The bridge was destroyed during the Avar invasions, probably in the 7th century. The ruins also contain an old Roman bath and an old basilica. The name Corabia reflects the fact that the new settlement was built from the remains of a wrecked Genoan ship (corabia is the Romanian language term for "sailing ship", specifically used for "galley"). It became a thriving port in the 1880s.

Under the communist regime, Corabia developed as a considerable manufacturing town, with a sugar mill, furniture factory, tannery, a fiber manufacturing plant, and various other facilities. However, in more recent times the town's population has dwindled. Many inhabitants have migrated to larger towns in the wake of the closure of many of Corabia's factories.

== Geography ==
Corabia is located in the southern part of Olt County, on the left bank of the Danube, on the border with Bulgaria. It administers two villages, Tudor Vladimirescu and Vârtopu. The town houses a football club, several shops and bars, the remains of the Roman castrum Sucidava, dating back to the Roman period and featuring the "Secret Fountain" (an unusual piece of engineering); the Holy Trinity Orthodox Cathedral (one of the largest buildings of its kind in Romania), as well as a monumental statue in the middle of the town square commemorating the use of Corabia's facilities in the initial attack during the Romanian War of Independence of 1877. Corabia also has an important archaeological museum with, inter alia, a remarkable collection of Roman pottery. From the town harbour one can make trips along the Danube, with stops at the nearby Băloi Island.

== Natives ==
- Pavel Chihaia (1922–2019), novelist
- Theodor Danetti (1926–2016), stage and film actor
- Nicolae Dobrescu (1874–1914), church historian and theologian
- Valentin Al. Georgescu (1908–1995), jurist, member of the Romanian Academy
- Pola Illéry (1909–1993), Romanian-American actress and singer
- Șerban Ionescu (1950–2012), actor
- Theodor D. Ionescu (1898–1990), chemical engineer, corresponding member of the Romanian Academy
- Virgil Mazilescu (1942–1984), poet, essayist, and translator
- Ion Oblemenco (1945–1996), footballer
- Ion Rîmaru (1946–1971), serial killer
- Robert Săceanu (born 1983), footballer
- Vladimir Screciu (born 2000), footballer
- Cristina Vărzaru (born 1979), handballer
- Ștefan Voitec (1900–1984), Marxist journalist and communist politician

== Gallery ==
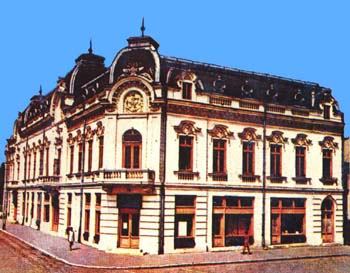
Culture House and Archaeological Museum

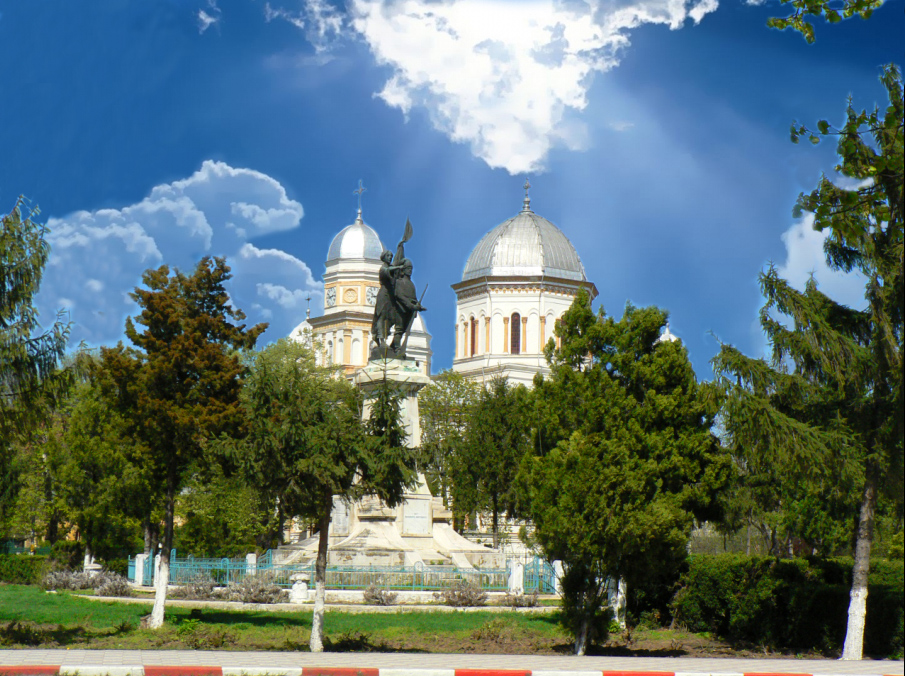
City center

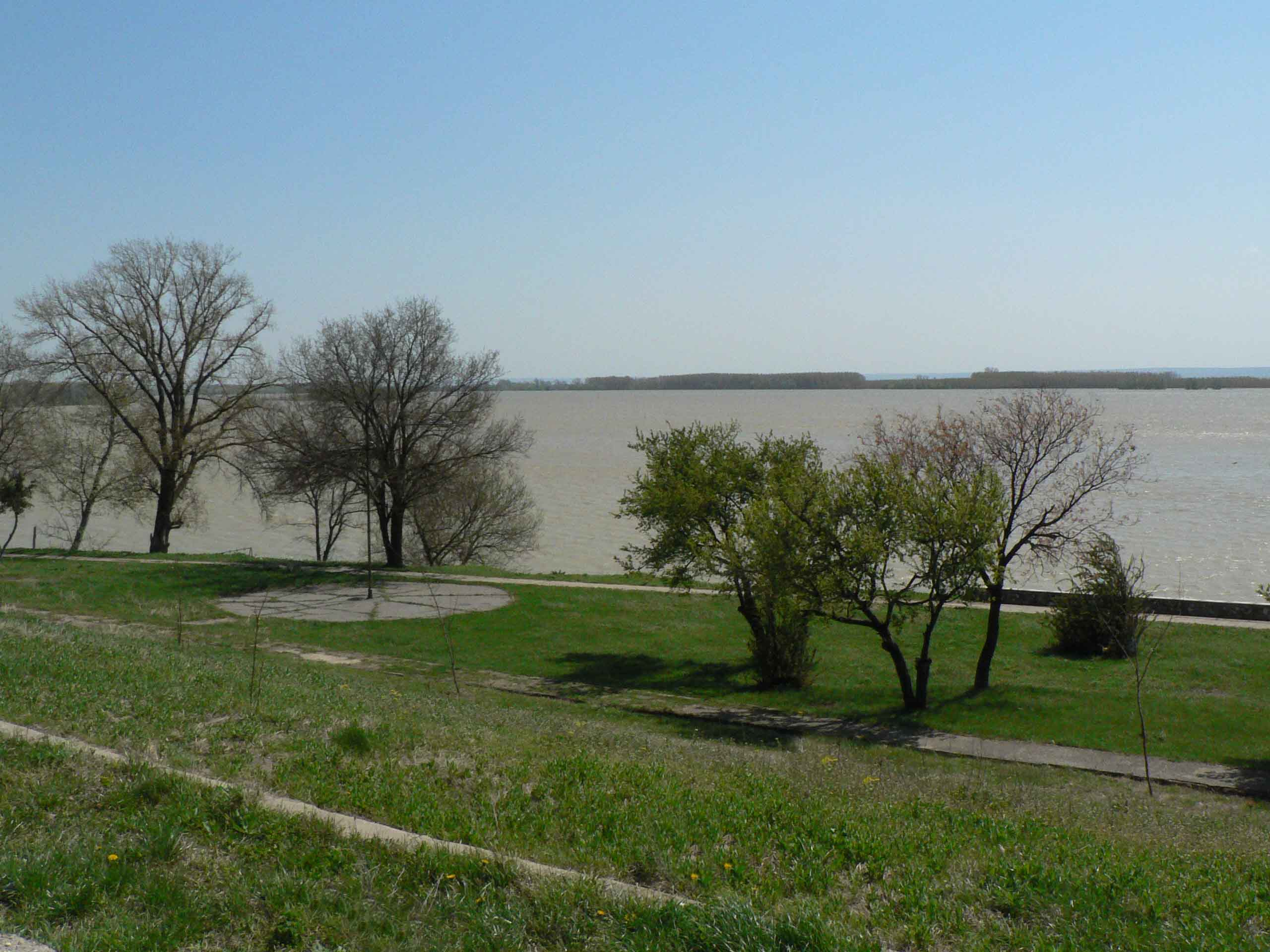
Danube at Corabia

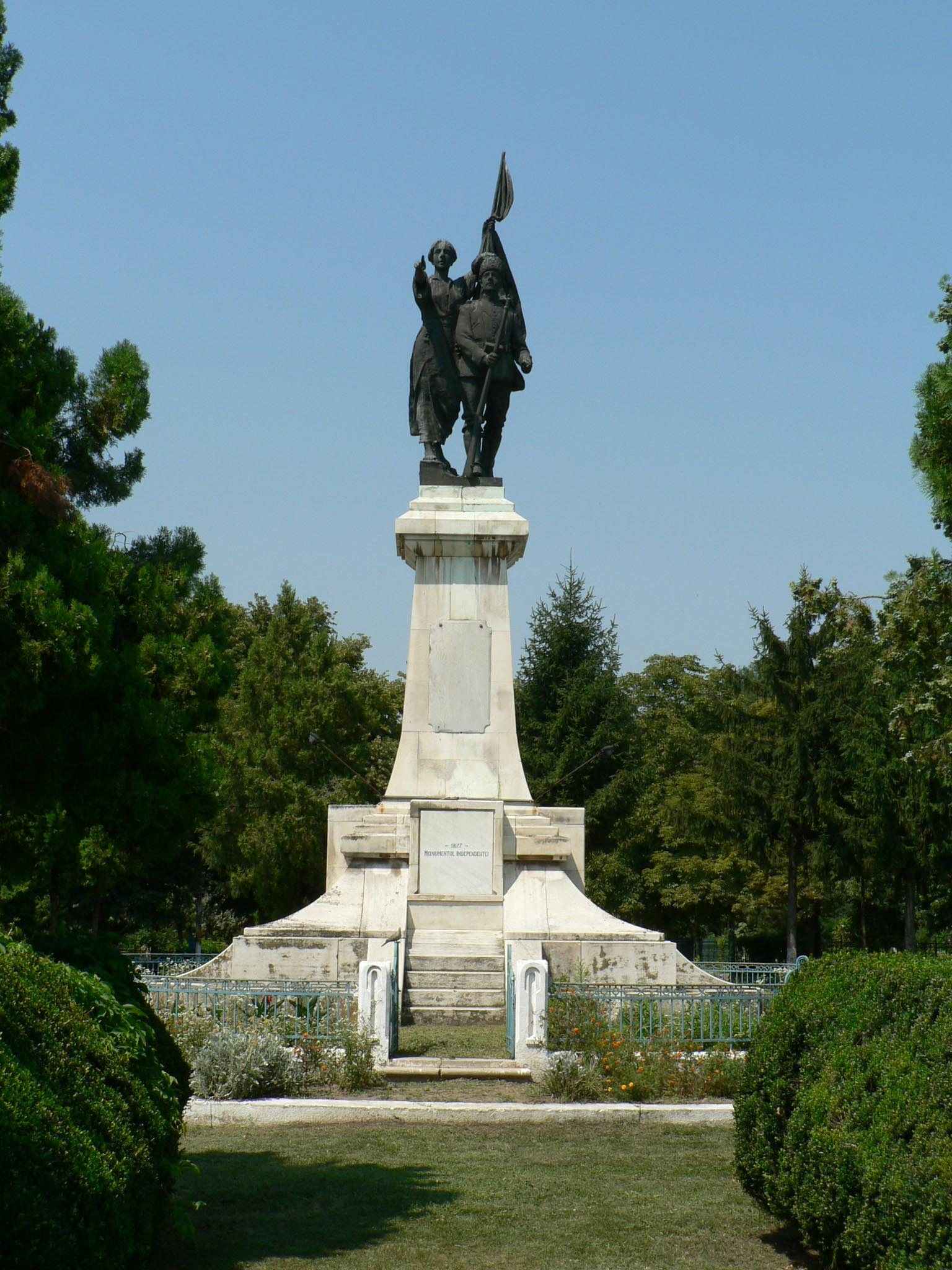
1877 Independence War Heroes Monument

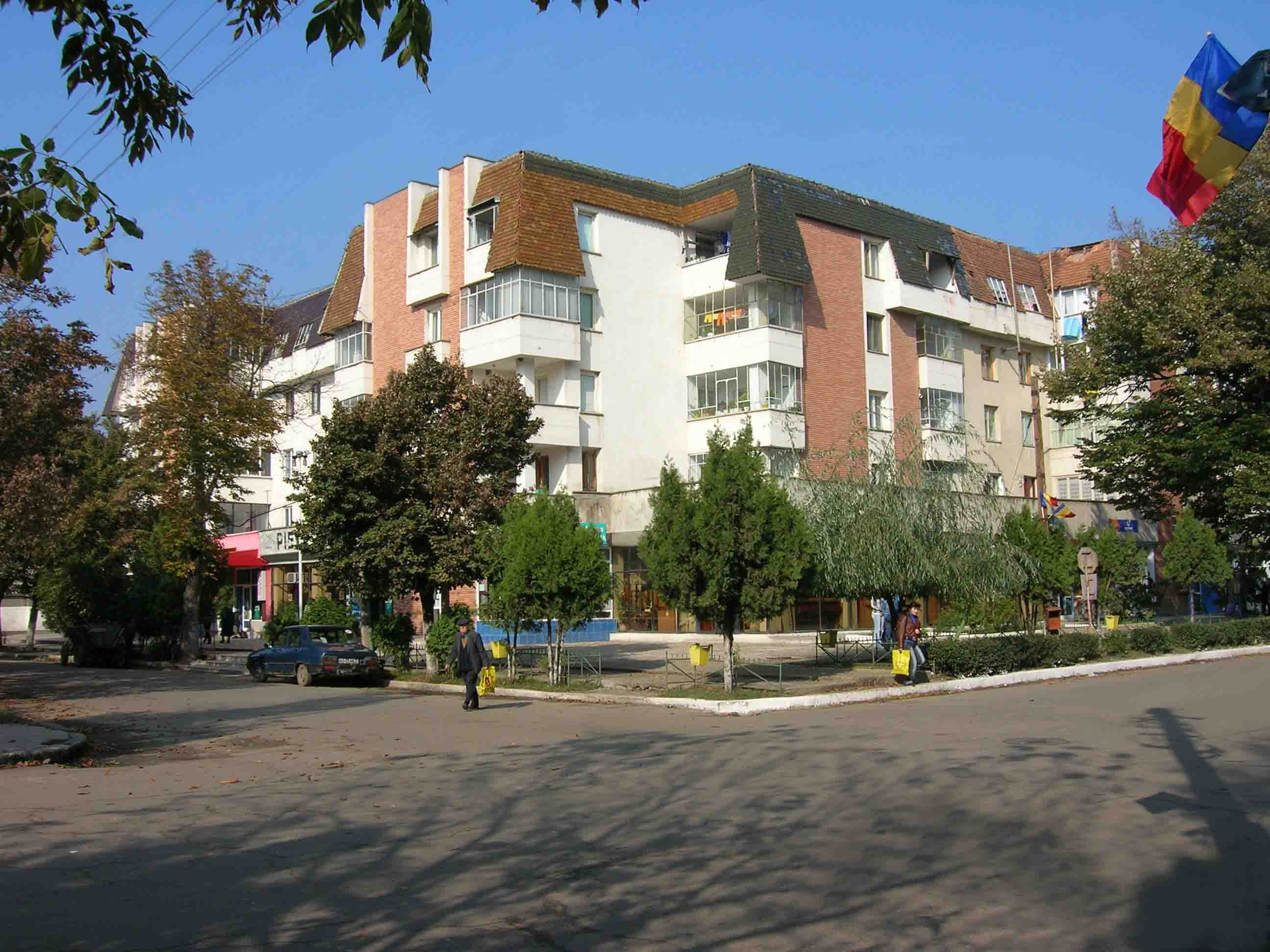
1 May Street

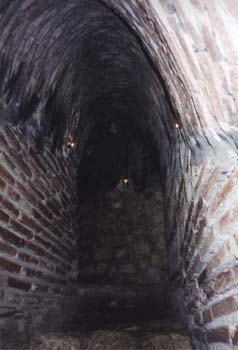
Sucidava's Secret Fountain

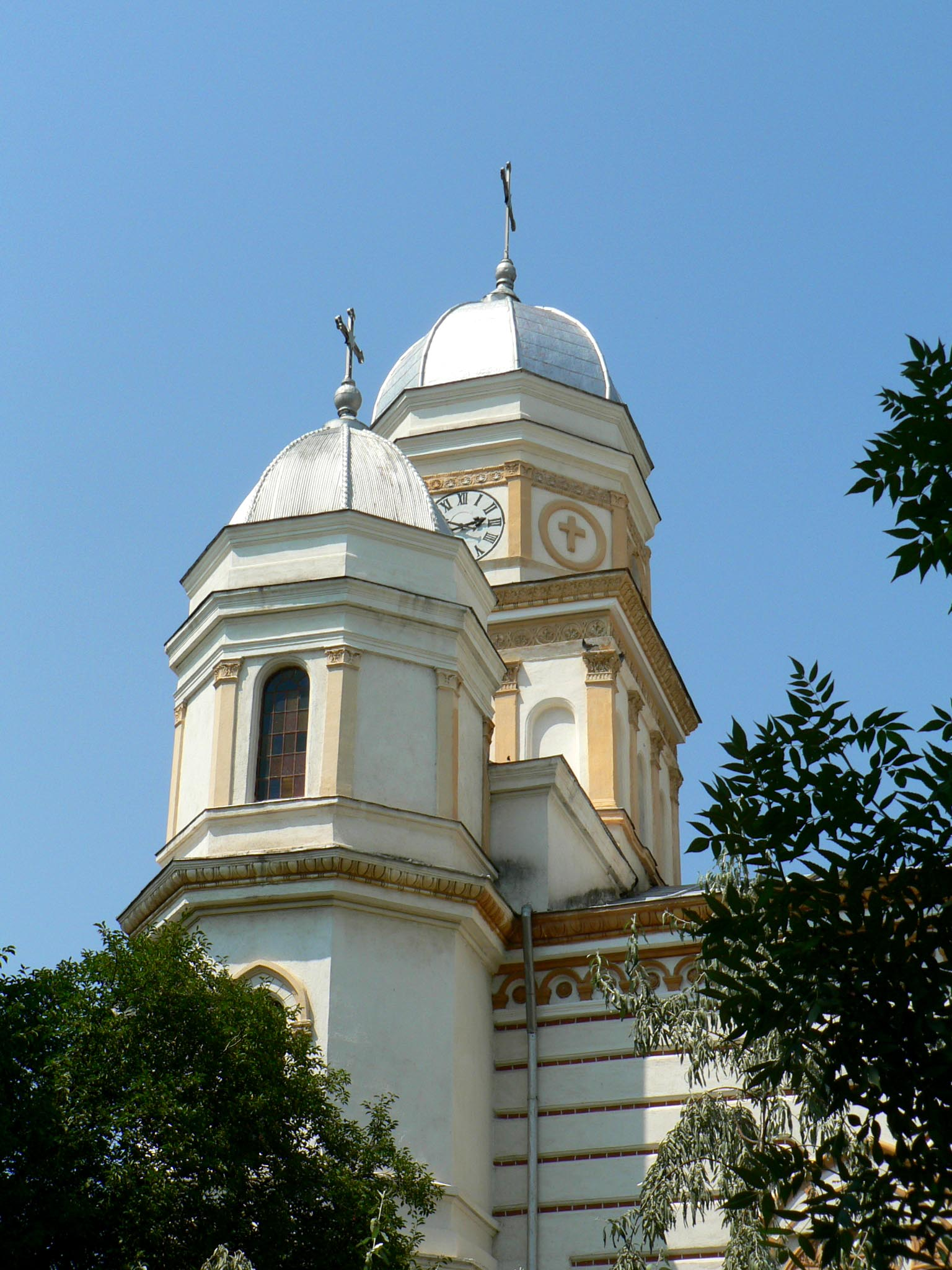
Holy Trinity Cathedral
