= Diocese of Slatina and Romanați =

The Diocese of Slatina and Romanați (Romanian: Episcopia Slatinei și Romanaților) is a diocese of the Romanian Orthodox Church. Its see is the Ascension Cathedral in Slatina and its ecclesiastical territory covers Olt County. The diocese forms part of the Metropolis of Oltenia. It was established in 2004, and in 2008, Sebastian Pașcanu became the diocese's first bishop.
