= White Church, Bucharest =

Heritage site in Bucharest, Romania

Coordinates: 44°26′31″N 26°05′41″E

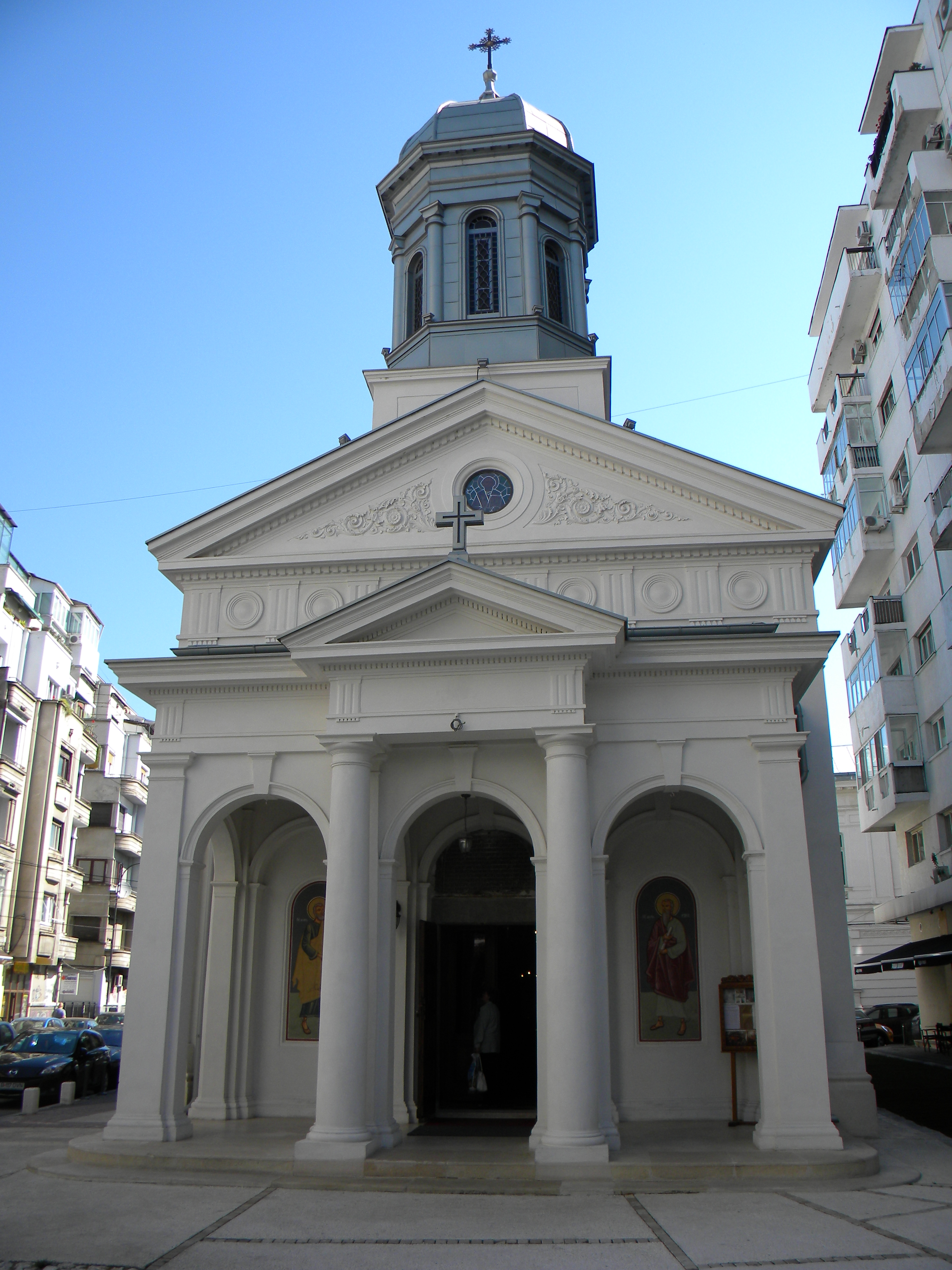
White Church

The White Church (Romanian: Biserica Albă) is a Romanian Orthodox church located at 110 Calea Victoriei in Bucharest, Romania. It is dedicated to Saint Nicholas.

The origins of the church are uncertain, but it probably existed in the late 17th century. It appears to have been founded on an estate of the Văcărescu family. The formal dedication likely occurred around 1700, with one theory suggesting a Văcărescu widow in the role of ktetorissa, while Jupâneasa Vișa and the priest Neagu Dârvaș are seen as likelier candidates. At any rate, the surrounding district and the church itself were nicknamed after the latter two between 1739 and 1835, while the present name became established around 1800. A wooden icon of Saint Nicholas dating to 1701–1702 confirms the church’s existence at that point. A funeral stone fragment from 1715–1716 is situated in the altar table. A restoration took place in 1784, and by 1802 the church was surrounded by monastic cells, demolished during the late-19th century urbanization.

Severely damaged by that year’s earthquake, and by the 1808 tremor, it was radically rebuilt in 1827, according to the pisanie. The high Clucer Nicolae Trăsnea, a trusted adviser to Prince Grigore IV Ghica, was responsible, at the same time adding a second dedication, to the Prophet Elijah. Between 1868 and 1873, the church was transformed: the two present domes were built of wood and tin, the portico was added, the facades and interior redone, the roof changed and windows enlarged. Gheorghe Tattarescu painted the interior. Two arches were added to the portico after 1910. The painting underwent maintenance during the 20th century, with an ample restoration occurring in 1961. The building was consolidated following the 1977 earthquake.

The single-nave church measures 30.3 meters long by 9.6 meters wide, with a semicircular altar apse. The two domes are octagonal on square bases: the Pantocrator dome above the nave, and the bell tower rising above the narthex. The portico is on the west side; shorter than the nave, it is open, has three frontal arches resting on masonry columns, with a triangular pediment. The narthex is just two meters deep, the result of installing a wall in 1871–1873. The nave is spacious, with a spherical ceiling. The altar has two deep niches for the tables, dug into the wall. The linden wood iconostasis is a valuable work of Brâncovenesc style sculpture. The exterior is covered in plaster; it is Neoclassical in style, with Doric inspiration visible in the pilasters, frieze and serrated cornice.

George Călinescu wrote: “the White Church is not beautiful, but it surprises through its immaculate white of a rural church in the heart of a large city”. Other observers who have remarked on the building include Gheorghe Ionescu Gion, Nicolae Iorga, Gheorghe Crutzescu, and Nicolae Vătămanu. The church is listed as a historic monument by Romania's Ministry of Culture and Religious Affairs.
