= Nifon Niculescu =

Nifon Niculescu (Romanian pronunciation: [niˈfon nikuˈlesku]; born Nicolae Niculescu [nikoˈla.e]; July 1, 1858–February 27, 1923) was a Romanian cleric who became a bishop within the Romanian Orthodox Church.

Born in Bucharest, he attended the central seminary from 1872 to 1880. He later enrolled in the University of Bucharest's theology faculty, obtaining a degree in 1892. In 1881, he became a deacon at the White Church, being transferred to the Kretzulescu Church the following year. After being ordained a priest, he served at the White Church from 1883 to 1895. For a time, he was an accountant at the Metropolis of Ungro-Wallachia and a professor of religion. He was left a widower and, in 1895, became a monk at Cernica Monastery, taking the name Nifon. The same year, he became vicar bishop of Ungro-Wallachia, with the title of Ploieșteanul, and remained in this position until 1909. In March 1909, he was elected and then enthroned as Bishop of the Lower Danube, with his see at Galați. He served until retiring at the beginning of 1922, and died a year later in Bucharest.

Noted as a specialist in liturgics and psaltic music, Niculescu published a book of church music in 1902. He edited a series of didactic and moralizing pamphlets and delivered numerous lectures, some of which were published.
