= Battle of Transylvania =

1916 battle of World War I

- Part of the Romanian campaign of World War I
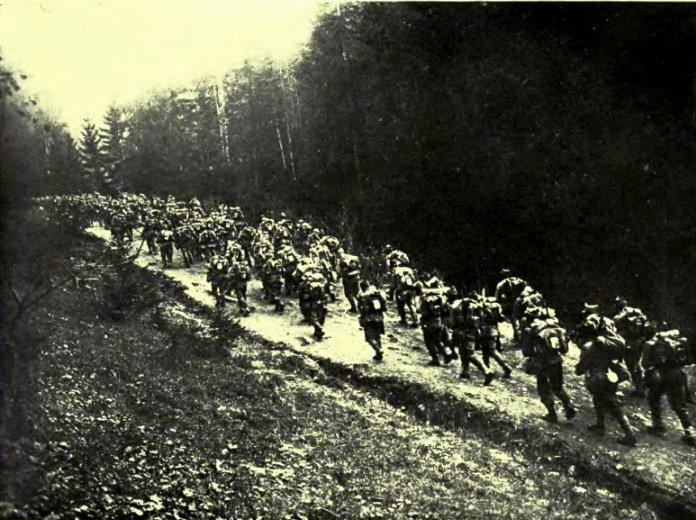
- Romanian troops crossing the mountains into Transylvania
Date	27 August – 16 October 1916
Location	Transylvania, Austria-Hungary (today in Romania)
Result	Central Powers victory Full results: Romanian invasion repulsed; Successful Romanian retreat (Central Powers failure to destroy any of the three Romanian armies); Erich von Falkenhayn replaced as Chief of Staff of the Imperial German Army; German offensive at Verdun halted, as well as German offensives on other fronts; Central Powers invasion of Dobruja; Assumption of supreme military command of the Central Powers by the German emperor

Belligerents
Kingdom of Romania	Austria-Hungary; German Empire

Commanders and leaders
(Kingdom of Romania) Ioan Culcer (Kingdom of Romania) Alexandru Averescu (Kingdom of Romania) Grigore Crăiniceanu (replaced Averescu after Turtucaia) (Kingdom of Romania) Constantin Prezan	(German Empire) Erich von Falkenhayn (Austria-Hungary) Arthur Arz von Straußenburg

Units involved
(Kingdom of Romania) 1st Army (Kingdom of Romania) 2nd Army (Kingdom of Romania) North Army	(Austria-Hungary) 1st Army (German Empire) 9th Army

Strength
27 August: 369,000 18 September: Less than the Central Powers	27 August: 34,000 18 September: >200,000

Casualties and losses
Unknown	Unknown
- 200,000 civilians internally displaced

The Battle of Transylvania was the first major operation of Romania during World War I, beginning on 27 August 1916. It started as an attempt by the Romanian Army to seize Transylvania, and potentially knock Austria-Hungary out of the war. Although initially successful, the offensive was brought to a halt after Bulgaria's attack on Dobruja. Coupled with a successful German and Austro-Hungarian counterattack which started in mid-September, the Romanian Army was eventually forced to retreat back to the Carpathians by mid-October. The Romanian armies however managed to escape the Central Powers' attempts to completely destroy them. The Battle of Transylvania also caused the replacement of the chief of staff of the German Army and the shifting of German attention to the region, causing German offensive operations at Verdun to cease.

== Background ==
Although bound by the pre-war Triple Alliance to the Central Powers, Romania instead joined the Triple Entente in August 1916, following the signing of the Treaty of Bucharest.

Officers from the Romanian General Staff began the planning of a potential invasion of Hungary as early as 1913, following Romania's successful expansion at Bulgaria's expense during the Second Balkan War. A draft document appeared in the summer of 1914, but Bulgaria's entry into the war on the side of the Central Powers in 1915 forced a major revision of the initial campaign plan. The final version, known as Hypothesis Z, was conceived by General Vasile Zottu. Hypothesis Z called for the Romanian occupation of Transylvania and Banat, using three armies (1st, 2nd and Northern) which amounted to a total of 420,000 soldiers (75% of Romania's field force). The 3rd Army, numbering 72,000 soldiers, was tasked with holding off a potential Bulgarian attack. Hypothesis Z envisioned an Austro-Hungarian opposing force numbering 70,000, but in reality, the actual number was less than half of the Romanian estimate. Another inaccurate Romanian estimate was the number of reinforcements that the Central Powers could deploy to the region: 100,000 compared to the actual number of 300,000.

In July 1916, the Austro-Hungarians began preparations for an eventual defense of Transylvania. By early August, enough units had been gathered in order to form an army, the 1st. On 7 August, this new army was put under the command of General Arthur Arz von Straussenburg. Arz's army had four weak divisions (30-35 battalions) and around 100 artillery pieces in 13 batteries. After the Romanian invasion commenced, the Austro-Hungarian 1st Army was reinforced with one cavalry division, one Reserve Hussar Brigade, one Honvéd infantry division and four battalions.

== Battle ==
=== South-Western Front ===
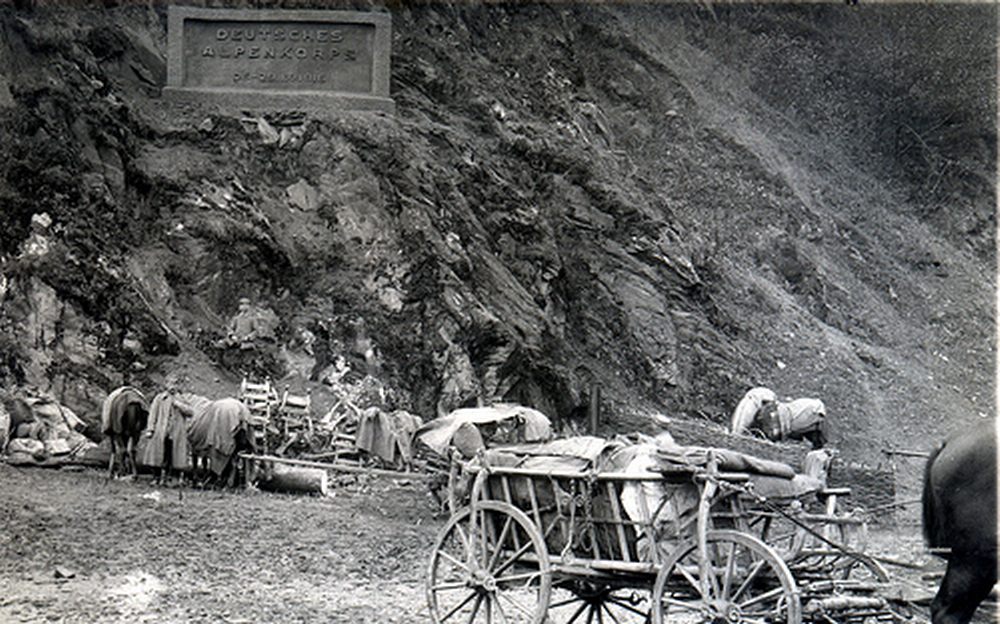
Abandoned Romanian equipment in the Turnu Roșu Pass

The Romanian 1st Army, commanded by General Ioan Culcer, crossed the border at the Surduc and Vulcan Passes and occupied Petrozsény (Petroșani) — the vital Transylvanian coal-mining center — on 29 August, easily defeating the Hungarian coal-miner battalions and inflicting heavy casualties. The 11th Infantry Division (General Ioan Muică) subsequently continued its advance Northwards, stopping 15 mi (24 km) South of Hátszeg (Hațeg). Although Muică waited for the rest of his Corps as planned (2nd Division and 1st Cavalry Brigade), this allowed the Austrians time to regroup. Sixty-five miles to the East, Culcer's main force — the Olt-Lotru Group — entered the Turnu Roșu Pass and advanced towards Nagyszeben (Sibiu). After sporadic shootings all throughout the night of 27/28 August, the Romanians took the village of Boica at the head of the Pass. The Lotru Group reached Nagytalmács (Tălmaciu) on 29 August, and subsequently regrouped there before advancing a few more miles North towards Nagyszeben (Sibiu), stopping at Vesztén (Șelimbăr). The advancing Romanians also blocked the important railroad linking Brassó (Brașov) and Nagyszeben (Sibiu). The Austrian commander at Nagyszeben (Sibiu), Colonel Arnold Barwick, sent an armored train to investigate, but this was set ablaze by the Romanians and rendered unserviceable. Nagydisznód (Cisnădie) was taken by the Romanians on 30 August. However, instead of advancing into Nagyszeben (Sibiu), the Romanians started to dig in South of the city during the night of 30 August. Nonetheless, Nagyszeben (Sibiu) was declared an open city and surrendered to the commander of the 23rd Division, General Matei Castris. Castris accepted the surrender, and neither side occupied the city, as the Romanians made no effort to occupy it and the Austrians withdrew. The 1st Army advanced very little throughout September. Its Eastern flank continued to dig in just south of the city, reinforcing its defense lines, while its Western flank moved into the Bănița (Merișor) valley. It inched northwest along the valley, but never left it. The Romanian forces stopped upon running into Austrian and German defenders, coupled with the threat of German forces disembarking at Karánsebes (Caransebeș).

By mid-September, the German 9th Army, under the overall command of Field Marshal Erich von Falkenhayn, was deployed to the region. However, the first German unit to arrive in Transylvania was the 187th Infantry Division, under Major General Edwin Sunkel. Its 187th Regiment was deployed to the area on 5 September. The Germans and Austrians began advancing on 14 September, and on the 18th they took Petrozsény (Petroșani). On 23 September, a skirmish between Germans and Romanians resulted in 107 Germans killed or wounded and 100 Romanians killed plus 23 more captured. The Battle of Nagyszeben (Sibiu) began at the dawn of 26 September, with an attack by the German 9th Army. Its forces in the area were commanded by General Hermann von Staabs, and included the Hungarian 51st Honvéd alongside two German units (187th Division and 76th Reserve Division). The German plan was to isolate the Romanians and cut off the escape route through the Red Tower Pass. The German attack on the 26th ran into stiff resistance, and failed. After amassing his artillery, von Staabs attacked again on the 27th, driving the Romanians towards the mouth of the Red Tower pass by nightfall. Twenty-four hours later, von Staabs had pushed the Romanians into the Pass. German Alpine Corps were deployed to both ends of the Pass on the 26th. The Romanian 48th Infantry Regiment was decimated by German machine gun fire when deployed against the German positions at the North of the Pass. Subsequently, Romanian forces in the Pass moved to its Eastern side, out of the range of German machine guns. Lacking heavy field artillery, the Germans could not completely block the Pass. The Romanians managed to drive off the Germans from the North of the pass, and temporarily from the South of it, but the latter soon returned. The Romanians began their retreat through the pass in earnest on the 28th, through the bullets of the Alpine Corps and German barricades of dead horses and wagons, which had to be blasted away by artillery. In the final hour of the battle, the Romanians made their way through machine gun fire towards the buildings which served as the firing points for the Alpine Corps at the South of the Pass, and bayoneted to death everyone inside. Then, during the afternoon of the 29th, the Romanian forces made it out of the pass and reached safety. Despite the heroic efforts of the Alpine Corps, the bulk of the Romanian force had escaped. The Germans captured the relatively small number of 3,000 prisoners. Although the bulk of the Romanian 1st Army had retreated from Transylvania, more fighting was yet to come. After the Germans captured Petrozsény (Petroșani), they shifted four of their six battalions in the city to contribute to the Battle of Nagyszeben (Sibiu). Ethnic Romanian sympathizers living in the region made General Culcer aware of this, and thus the Romanians counterattacked and re-captured Petrozsény (Petroșani) on the 25th of September. In response, Falkenhayn deployed the German 301st Division under General Johannes von Busse, which arrived in the region on the 28th, linking up with the 2nd Austro-Hungarian Mountain Brigade. The Central Powers commenced their attack on the 30th, capturing Petrozsény (Petroșani) and the Surduc Pass by 5 October after hard fighting. This time however, the Romanians succeeded in destroying the vital coal mines before retreating.

=== South-Eastern Front ===
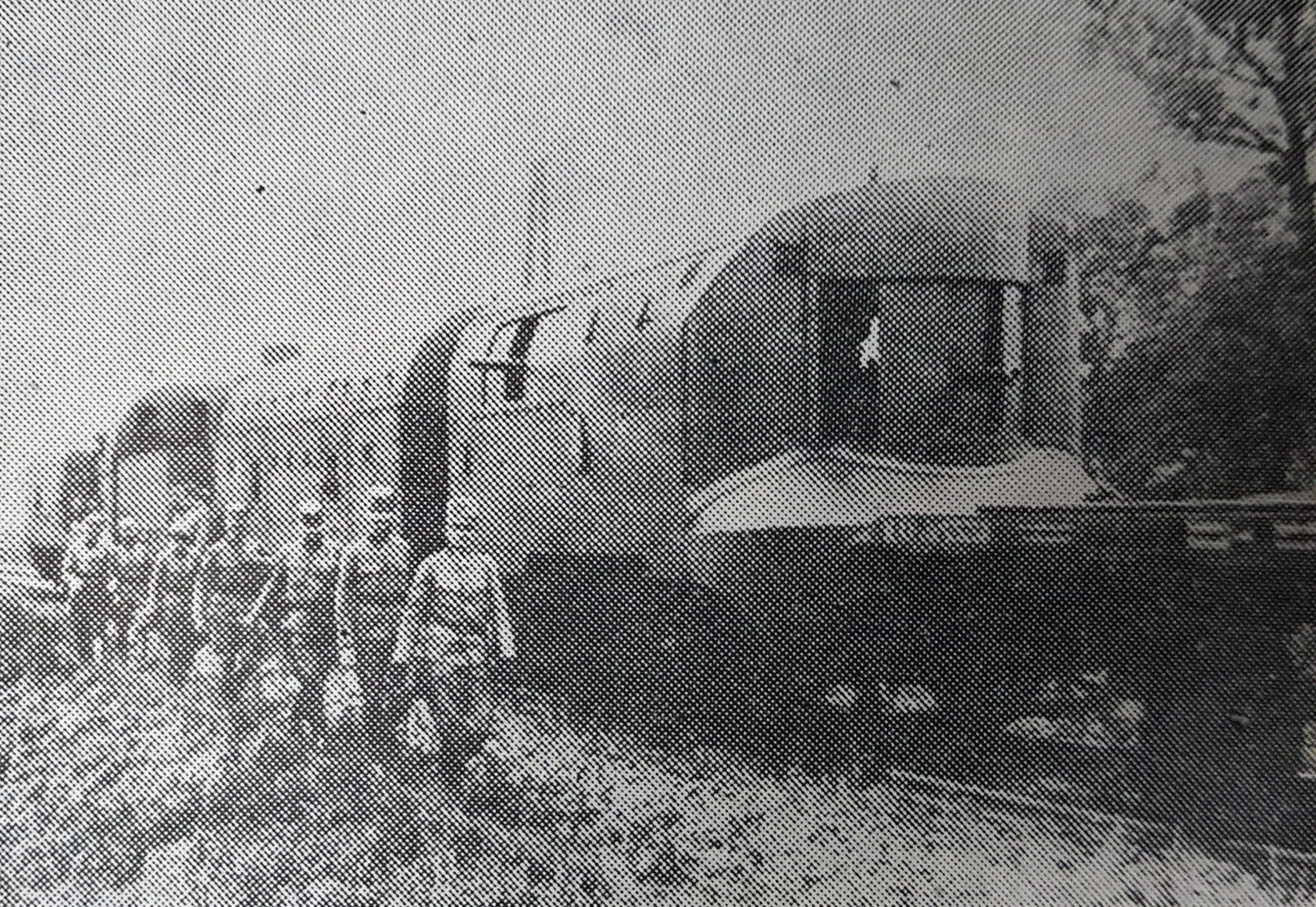
Austro-Hungarian armored train on the Transylvanian front

The Romanian 2nd Army, commanded by General Alexandru Averescu, converged on Brassó (Brașov) through five mountain passes. It was opposed by the 71st Infantry Troop division, commanded by General Anton Goldbach. At the Alsótömös (Timișu de Jos), the Székelys' 1st Battalion, supported by an armored train, held its ground for an entire day, only being pushed back on the night of 28 August. In the afternoon of the 29th, the Romanians closed on Brassó (Brașov), their artillery destroying the last train. After local ethnic Romanians surrendered the city to the commander of the 6th Infantry Regiment, Romanian units entered Brassó (Brașov) at around 5 pm and paraded towards the municipal plaza. At the start of September, the 3rd Division inched west along the Olt river towards Fogaras (Făgăraș), reaching Persány (Perșani). The 4th Division occupied Földvár (Feldioara) on 30 August. The 6th Division occupied Sepsiszentgyörgy (Sfântu Gheorghe) on 6 September. The 2nd Army crossed the Olt River at its Southern part on 15 September, then attacked on a line from Fogaras (Făgăraș) to Homoród (Homorod), threatening the juncture between two German units. A breakthrough there would have, at the very least, prevented the German 9th Army from advancing on Nagyszeben (Sibiu). However, the 2nd Army's new commander, General Grigore C. Crăiniceanu, was unaware of just how close he was to rupturing the enemy lines and smash open the front. A Central Powers counterattack stopped the plodding Romanian forces. Crăiniceanu's timidity stemmed partly from the fact that the Romanian General Staff had recently stripped his army of half of its strength, shifting three of its divisions to the Dobruja front. The 2nd Army began to advance northwest again after 10 days. The town of Fogaras (Făgăraș) was taken by the 2nd Army on 16 September. The 2nd Army started advancing again on 29 September, pushing back the Honvéd 2nd Cavalry Division and reaching Székelykeresztúr (Cristuru Secuiesc), a dozen miles from Segesvár (Sighișoara).

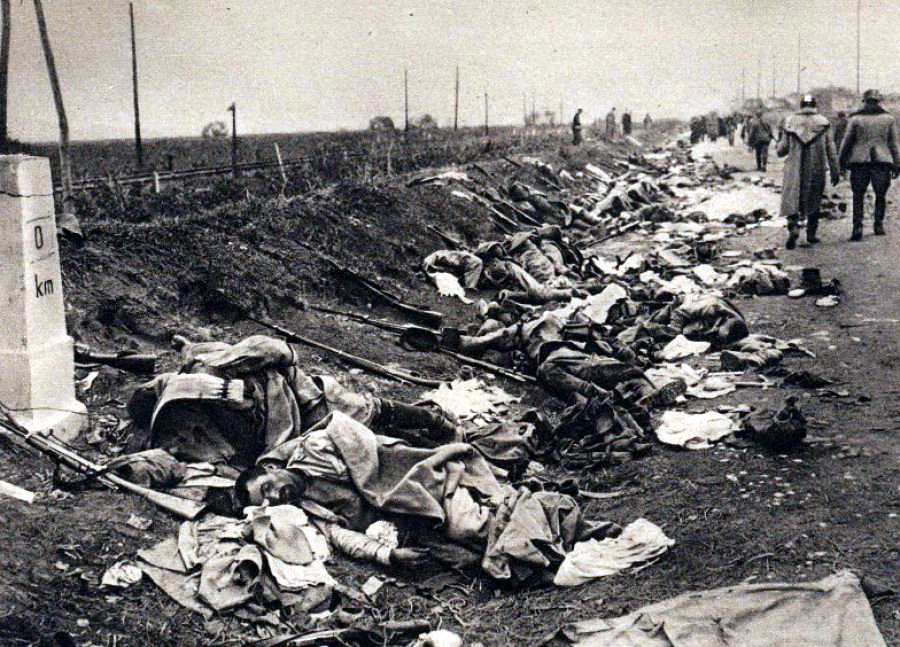
Fallen Romanian soldiers at the Bertalan railway station

The initial German advance in the region was resisted by a powerful Romanian counterattack, which inflicted heavy German losses. However, instead of pressing their advantage, the Romanians began to withdraw to their defensive line West of Brassó. After a mostly unhindered retreat, made possible by the Romanian counterattack at the start of October, the Romanians took up defensive positions to the West of Burzenland late on 4 October, fighting in the area starting early on 5 October. The town of Fogaras (Făgăraș)was held by the Romanians between 16 September and 4 October. The Battle of Brassó (Brașov) lasted from 7 to 9 October. There was a thick fog on the night of 7 October, however this did not prevent two regiments commanded by Sunkel from entering the outskirts of the city earlier that day. When the fog cleared on the morning of the 8th, it revealed walls of Romanian infantry standing between Sunkel's regiments in Brassó (Brașov) and the 187th Regiment outside the city. Although initially dissolved by artillery fire, the Romanian formations soon reformed and advanced amidst German artillery shells. Romanian riflemen moved towards Barcaszentpéter (Sânpetru), but most were forced to withdraw by German machine gun fire. Although a few Romanians found cover in the corn fields, most retreated to their initial positions. The Romanians in the corn fields could not be dislodged, despite repeated attempts. Inside Brassó (Brașov), house-to-house battles raged in the outlying sections of the city. Powerful Romanian counterattacks against Sunkel's two regiments repeatedly failed. A Honvéd brigade led by a Colonel Gundell accompanied the Germans, and together they slowly scattered several Romanian battalions. At around 3 pm, the German 89th Division attacked the Romanian forces around Barcaszentpéter (Sânpetru), but for some inexplicable reason the Germans failed to press all the way to the village. Destroyed bridges, poor reconnaissance and minor enemy resistance ultimately stopped the tired soldiers of the 89th Division, which set up camp near the village despite Falkenhayn's orders to "stay glued to the retreating enemy". The Romanians retreated from Brassó (Brașov) during the night of 8/9 October, amidst German machine gun fire from vantage points in and around the city. Many trains, loaded with artillery, munitions, supplies and even soldiers, were abandoned. The 187th Infantry Regiment marched into town on the morning of 9 October, as soon as it was daylight, amidst cheers of the local Saxon population. An entire Romanian company was found dead near the train station, mowed down by German machine guns. Added to these were 1,175 prisoners. Twenty-five artillery pieces and numerous small arms were also captured.

=== Northern Front ===
The Romanian North Army had the mission of moving along three invasion routes into Eastern Transylvania, keeping contact with both the Russian Southeast Front in Bukovina and the Romanian 2nd Army North of Brașov. The North Army had the largest number of soldiers of the three Romanian armies invading Transylvania. It was commanded by General Constantin Prezan.
Opposed to the North Army was the Austro-Hungarian 61st Infantry Troop Division, which included two Honvéd reserve brigades (the 16th and the 19th). The two brigades had recently returned from the Galician Front, and were in a state of collapse.

The weak Austro-Hungarian forces fell apart at the first push of the Romanian covering forces. The two regiments of the Romanian 15th Brigade of the 8th Division marched through the Oituz Pass and reached Kézdivásárhely (Târgu Secuiesc) on 29 August, in time to destroy the last train leaving from the town. The 2nd Cavalry Division followed, marching to Sepsiszentgyörgy (Sfântu Gheorghe). The 7th Division's two brigades (the 13th and the 14th) marched through two passes (Úz and Gyimes) into Csík County. Hungarians of the exhausted and under-manned 19th Brigade, under Colonel Szabo, offered little resistance, its engineers managing to blow up the crucial Karakó railroad viaduct near Palanca. The two Romanian brigades of the 7th Division failed to pursue the Hungarians west of the Olt, as they stopped at Csíkszereda (Miercurea Ciuc) and dug in on the eastern side of the river.
Further north, the Austrians gave up Bélbor (Bilbor) when they ran out of ammunition, and managed to keep the Romanians East of Borszék (Borsec) as well as engaging them successfully in the Neagra Șarului Valley. The Romanians also failed to establish contact between their northernmost forces and the left flank of the Russian Southeast Front.

For the most part, however, Austro-Hungarian forces limped towards the Transylvanian interior. The North Army crossed the Olt River on 7 September. The 7th Division pushed aside Colonel Zoltán Szabó's 19th Honvéd Brigade and advanced through the Harghita Mountains towards Székelyudvarhely (Odorheiu Secuiesc). The 14th Division captured Gyergyószentmiklós (Gheorgheni) from Colonel Kornél Bernátzky's 16th Honvéd Brigade, reaching the eastern edges of the salt-mining town of Parajd (Praid)on 11 September. The 14th Divisions's 22nd Brigade emerged from the Gyergyó (Giurgeu) Mountains and began advancing slowly along both banks of the river Maros (Mureș) towards Maroshévíz (Toplița). On 13 September, the Romanians had driven the Austrian 1st Landsturm Cavalry Brigade from the heights near Parajd (Praid).

A setback for the 2nd Army came during the Battle of the Kelemen (Călimani) Mountains. During fighting which lasted from 17 September to 9 October, the Austro-Hungarian VII Battalion of the 73rd Infantry Regiment (reinforced by the 6/9 Mountain Artillery Battery) under the command of Colonel Sámuel Sándor, together with gendarmes under the command of Major Ziegler, drove the Romanians back to the East of the mountains. Austro-Hungarian casualties totaled 199 (10 killed, 63 wounded, 82 missing and 44 captured) and Romanian casualties totaled 191 (136 killed and 55 captured).

The North Army renewed its offensive on 28 September. Over the next week, the North Army continued advancing despite stubborn Austro-Hungarian resistance. Prezan's forces advanced to within six miles of Szászrégen (Reghin), and secured the heights above Parajd (Praid) by early October. The aftermath of the Battle of Brassó (Brașov) ended the Romanian advance. Prompted by events in the Dobruja region (Battle of Turtucaia, Battle of Dobrich) the Romanian North Army was ordered to retreat. The exhausted Austro-Hungarian 1st Army under General Arthur Arz von Straussenburg moved slowly, giving the Romanians an uncontested run to the border. After retreating, the Romanians settled into the defensive positions near the border that they had prepared before the war. Austro-Hungarian patrols crossed the Romanian border at Palanca in the Ghimeș Pass region on 13 October. On the following day, 14 October, the Uz and Oituz Passes were reached, where violent fighting began.

The town of Kézdivásárhely (Târgu Secuiesc) was the Transylvanian urban settlement that was held by the Romanians during the Battle of Transylvania for the longest. The Romanian 15th Brigade of the 8th Division of the Romanian North Army took Kézdivásárhely (Târgu Secuiesc) on 29 August. Austrian military maps reveal that the town remained in Romanian hands well into October. On 8 and 9 October, as the Battle of Brassó was drawing to a close, two Romanian units retreated from the north and northwest and formed a defensive perimeter around Kézdivásárhely. As of 14 October, most of the Romanian North Army's positions had fallen back towards the Romanian border, with the exception of Kézdivásárhely. As late as that day, the town was still firmly in Romanian hands, with Romanian positions to both the north and the south of it. It is not known when exactly was the town retaken by the Central Powers, but the date could only be 15 or 16 October, because on the latter date, the Battle of Transylvania ended: by 16 October, the Romanians had been driven back all along the line and Transylvania had been cleared.

== Romanian occupation of Transylvania ==
The Romanian occupation of Transylvania was geographically divided into two territories. The larger territory comprised the area occupied by the 2nd and 4th Armies. These two armies managed to come into touch and form a contiguous front. The smaller territory comprised the area occupied by the Romanian 1st Army. A gap of 15 miles separated its extreme right wing from the vanguard of the 2nd Army. Although the location of the 1st Army's extreme right wing was later reached by the 2nd Army, the Romanian detachment which had stood there had been forced to retreat, and the two armies remained separated. At peak, the three Romanian armies were in control of almost a quarter of Transylvania's historical territory (~14,000 square km).

=== 2nd and 4th/North Armies ===
The zenith of Romanian rule in Eastern Transylvania during 1916 lasted just under two weeks. For 13 days (21 September to 4 October), the Romanian 2nd and North Armies occupied five Hungarian county capitals. Brassó (Brașov), the capital of Brassó County, was the first to be occupied, on 29 August. It was followed by Sepsiszentgyörgy (Sfântu Gheorghe) — capital of Háromszék County — on 6 September, while Csíkszereda (Miercurea Ciuc) — the capital of Csík County — fell around the same time. Fogaras (Făgăraș)— capital of Fogaras County — was taken on 16 September, being finally followed by Székelyudvarhely (Odorheiu Secuiesc) on 21 September, the capital of Udvarhely County. Subsequently, the first one of these capitals to be lost was Fogaras, on 4 October. It was followed by Brassó, Sepsiszentgyörgy, and Székelyudvarhely during 7–8 October, with Csíkszereda finally being evacuated by the Romanians on 11 October. Aside from the county capitals, several capitals of districts within counties whose capitals weren't occupied by Romanian forces were also conquered by the Romanians during the Battle of Transylvania. The Romanian 2nd Army occupied two district capitals, both within Nagy-Küküllő County. Kőhalom (Rupea), the capital of Kőhalom District, was taken by the Romanians on 16 September and recovered by the Austro-Hungarians on 5 October. For an unknown amount of time, the Romanians also held Nagysink (Cincu/Gross-Schenk), capital of Nagysink District. The 2nd and North Armies reached their high-water mark in Transylvania on 3 October. That day, the line of the unified front of the two Romanian armies ran through Libánfalva (Ibănești), west of Parajd (Praid), west of Székelykeresztúr (Cristuru Secuiesc), Hégen (Brădeni/Henndorf), Báránykút (Bărcuț/Bekokten), and Nagysink (Cincu/Gross-Schenk). This line stood at a dozen miles from both Segesvár (Sighișoara/Schässburg) and Marosvásárhely (Târgu Mureș).

=== 1st Army ===
Advanced troops of the 1st Army occupied Nagyszeben (Sibiu/Hermannstadt) — seat of Szeben County — on 2 September. On the following day, however, the town was evacuated. When Transylvania came under the protection of the Habsburgs in the late 17th century, Nagyszeben became its seat. For most of the 18th century and a short period of the 19th, Nagyszeben was the residence of the governors of Transylvania. The 1st Army also occupied district seats. Petrozsény (Petroșani), the seat of Petrozsény District within Hunyad County, was taken on 29 August, lost for the first time on 18 September, then reconquered on the 25th before being lost for good during fighting in the area between 30 September and 5 October. The fighting for the town itself took place between 1 and 3 October. Nagydisznód (Cisnădie/Heltau), seat of Nagydisznód District within Szeben County, was taken by the Romanian 1st Army on 30 August before being lost on 27 September. The 1st Army reached its peak advance into Transylvania in the first half of September. By 12 September, three-fourths of the distance between the vital junction of Hátszeg (Hațeg/Wallenthal) and the Romanian border had been covered. Two days earlier, on 10 September, the 1st Army entered Sellenberk (Șelimbăr/Schellenberg).

== Aftermath ==
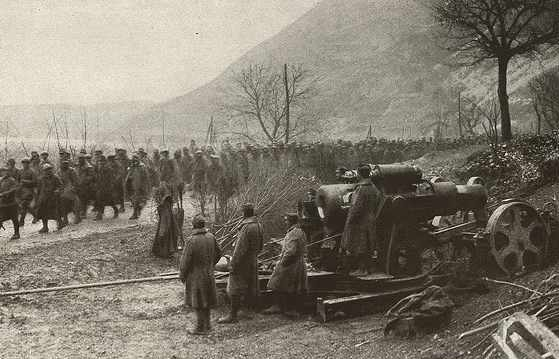
Austrian mortar battery at Turnu Roșu Pass, with a column of Romanian prisoners of war in the background

The Romanian invasion caused the sacking of Erich von Falkenhayn as the chief of staff of the Imperial German Army. He was replaced by Paul von Hindenburg and Erich Ludendorff. Falkenhayn's dismissal made him "the first German casualty of the campaign". Stopping the Romanian advance into Transylvania became the top German priority, meaning that the offensive at Verdun had to be ended. The German 9th Army was created on 6 September specifically to deal with the situation in Transylvania, and it was commanded by Falkenhayn. Several of its units were moved to Transylvania from various fronts: two Reserve Corps headquarters from the Baltic Front, the 187th Infantry Division from Alsace, the 89th Infantry Division from Galicia, and the 3rd Cavalry Division from Russia. Although commanders from all fronts begged Ludendorff for reinforcements, the latter made his priorities clear: "Hold on to all our positions along the Western, Eastern, Italian and Macedonian Fronts; [and] deploy any and all available forces for the decisive blow against the Romanians.". The Austrians moved mountain brigades from the Italian Front to Transylvania, while the Germans redeployed the Alpine Corps from Verdun and the 76th Reserve Division from Riga.

Before the counter-offensive of the Central Powers, it was established that Germany would be in charge. On 28 August, the Austrians - unable to muster resistance at any level - reluctantly agreed to a unified Central Powers command for the Eastern Front. This essentially meant handing control of all military operations to the Germans. Due to the Austro-Hungarians being initially outnumbered more than 10 to 1, Romania could be defeated only through the joint effort of all four Central Powers, but this would have been possible only under a unified command. During September the Central Powers ratified agreements making the German emperor their supreme commander, a concession which gave Hindenburg and Ludendorff control over the Austro-Hungarian, Bulgarian and Ottoman armies. Politically, the new unified command under the German Kaiser was created on 7 September. It not only cemented German ascendancy in the Berlin-Vienna alliance, but also limited the Austro-Hungarian diplomatic initiative. The Central Powers chain of command during the battle was clear: the Austro-Hungarian General Arz was the one taking orders from the German General Falkenhayn, not the other way around. An example of this can be found towards the end of the battle, when Falkenhayn ordered Arz to pursue the retreating enemy.

The German 9th Army defeated and drove back across the Transylvanian border two Romanian armies, but failed to destroy them. The bulk of the Romanian 1st Army managed to escape through the Red Tower Pass, leaving behind only 3,000 prisoners. The Romanian 2nd Army left behind even fewer prisoners during its retreat across the border, just 1,175. The German 89th Division failed to "stay glued to the retreating enemy", as Falkenhayn had ordered. Instead, its tired soldiers set up camp. The amount of Romanian prisoners was small compared to comparable battles against the Russians. Falkenhayn attributed this to the ability of the Romanians to fade away into the mountains, but the speed of the Romanian withdrawal also played a part. Other factors for the "disappointing" number of prisoners include determined Romanian counterattacks which - combined with the ruggedness of the terrain - left the Germans too tired to conduct immediate pursuits, as well as determined rearguard actions which forced Falkenhayn's units to exercise caution. Nonetheless, the Germans did their absolute best, with Falkenhayn himself stating: "with the best will in the world it was not possible to increase our efforts".

The Austro-Hungarian 1st Army performed much poorer than its German ally. Despite stubborn resistance, it continued to be pushed back by the Romanian North Army as late as October. When the North Army was ordered to retreat in early October, the exhausted Austrians moved slowly and gave their enemies an uncontested run to the border. The field performance of the opposing Romanian and Austro-Hungarian armies thus appears to confirm Ludendorff's statement: "The Romanians are bad soldiers; the Austrians even worse."

Over 200,000 Hungarians and Saxons evacuated the border regions. Two thirds of the population of Nagyszeben (Sibiu) moved out, and an even greater proportion left Csíkszereda (Miercurea Ciuc).

At the height of their offensive, the Romanians were in control of almost a third of Transylvania (7,000 square miles or 18,000 square km). This area comprised the entirety of four administrative departments (Brassó, Csík, Fogaras and Háromszék) and parts of five others. Up to this time, the Romanians had captured 7,000 prisoners. During the Romanian offensive, the Austro-Hungarian Motorkanonwagen was destroyed by Romanian artillery. This was an armored self-propelled rail car, armed with a turreted 7 cm gun. It was the sole example made, and the most futuristic-looking piece of Austro-Hungarian rail armor.

After the Romanian Army withdrew from Transylvania, in July 1917, the Hungarian Government created the "Hungarian Cultural Area", comprising the mainly Romanian inhabited Krassó-Szörény, Hunyad, Szeben, Fogaras, and Brassó counties on the border with Romania. These counties welcomed the Romanian troops when they invaded, so they were united in this "cultural area" in order to prevent them from any exposure to "foreign influence". By the end of the war, over 3,000 Romanian primary schools were closed.

Although the battle was practically over by mid-October, major operations in the region ceasing, this was not the absolute end of the Romanian occupation. For instance, when the Central Powers launched the First Battle of the Jiu Valley on 23 October, the Eastern flank of the Central Powers troops was several miles behind the Transylvanian border, meaning that the Romanians had held onto that sliver of Transylvanian territory up until that point. Although the battle was a Romanian victory, it did amount to a complete withdrawal of the Romanian 1st Army from Transylvania. A cause for confusion regarding the end date of the Battle of Transylvania lays in the fact that the region's borders had been altered since 1916. The town of Predeal, part of Romania at the start of the 1916 campaign, is today part of the Transylvanian county of Brașov. Thus, judging by the current borders of the region, the battle would have actually ended on 25 October, when the fighting for Predeal ceased and the town was seized by the Central Powers. The end of the Battle of Transylvania did not necessarily mean the end of Romanian presence in the region, as small-scale offensives across the border continued for some time longer. For example, as late as 26 October, the Romanians captured Balánbánya (Bălan/Kupferbergwerk).

=== Analysis ===
When the battle started on 27 August, 34,000 Austro-Hungarian soldiers opposed 369,000 Romanians, amounting to a Romanian numerical superiority of over 10 to 1. This situation was largely reversed by the middle of September. By 18 September, the armies of the Central Powers amounted to more than 200,000 men, outnumbering the 10 Romanian divisions left in Transylvania.

The Romanian offensive was doomed from the start. Its plan of action was the brainchild of General Vasile Zottu, who was paid by the Central Powers. Zottu's name was found on a list of people, Lista lui Günther, who were allegedly bought by the head of a major German oil company operating in Romania. Zottu was allowed the face-saving cover of taking sick leave. Zottu's campaign plan provided advantages for the Central Powers. The plan envisioned 12 days of regrouping after the initial Romanian crossing of the Carpathians. The Romanians halted their offensive at the end of August and started to dig in, pleasantly surprising the Germans and Austrians, who could "scarcely believe their luck". However, Zottu's plan was overruled at a war council on 2 September, and the Romanian offensive resumed. Zottu's plan also left the Romanian 3rd Army alone to defend the Southern border against Bulgaria. At Turtucaia, Romanian defenses consisted mainly of reservists with little or no military training and militias. This force also had only 72 working artillery pieces, and no bridge over the Danube. Finally, when German forces crossed the Danube at Zimnicea in November, Zottu - with 60,000 troops under his command - did nothing but wait. After some discussions at a war council in Bucharest, Zottu confessed and was allowed to commit suicide.

The main drawbacks of the Romanian Army were its technological backwardness and lack of experience. It preferred frontal attacks by masses of infantry, but its forces wilted before machine guns and heavy artillery. Thirteen of Romania's 23 divisions had no howitzers at all, relying on light field guns of 75 mm and 53 mm. The 25 batteries of 120 mm howitzers were scattered among 10 lucky divisions. The 10 divisions also had on average 30 machine guns each, while each of the remaining 13 had half as many. By contrast, a German division in 1916 had on average 54 machine guns, not counting the light machine guns of its light infantry. The causes of military failure differed between the three Romanian armies. The 1st Army was simply overpowered. It successfully resisted the Germans at Nagyszeben (Sibiu) on 26 September, the first day of the battle, but began to fall back the following day, after the Germans had amassed their artillery. While it lost Petrozsény (Petroșani) on 18 September, it counterattacked a week later on the 25th and briefly recaptured the town, enabling its troops to destroy its strategically important coal mines, before being pushed back for good between 30 September and 5 October. The 2nd Army had its commander replaced in early September and its forces halved, after three of its divisions were shifted to the Dobruja front. The new commander missed the opportunity to smash open the front in mid-September. The new commander of the 2nd Army, General Grigore C. Crăiniceanu, was poorly regarded. An officer of the general staff found him unqualified, while Alexandru Marghiloman, the leader of the Conservative Party, had this to say about his appointment: "How is that possible?...Do not make such a mistake; he has been confused all his life, and he is absolutely worn out.". Thus, while the Germans had defeated the halved and poorly led 2nd Army by mid-October, it is not known if the outcome would have been the same if they had faced a full-sized 2nd Army under Averescu's command. Averescu, the 2nd Army's initial commander, would eventually be promoted to the rank of marshal. The North Army, aside from a setback in the Kelemen Mountains, was not actually defeated. It continued advancing as late as October, despite stubborn Austro-Hungarian resistance. The North Army was not pushed back by the enemy; rather, it was ordered to retreat because of the events unfolding in Dobruja. Ordered to pursue the Romanians, the exhausted Austrians moved slowly, giving their enemies an uncontested run to the border. There, the Romanians settled into the defensive positions they had prepared before the war.

== Battle maps ==
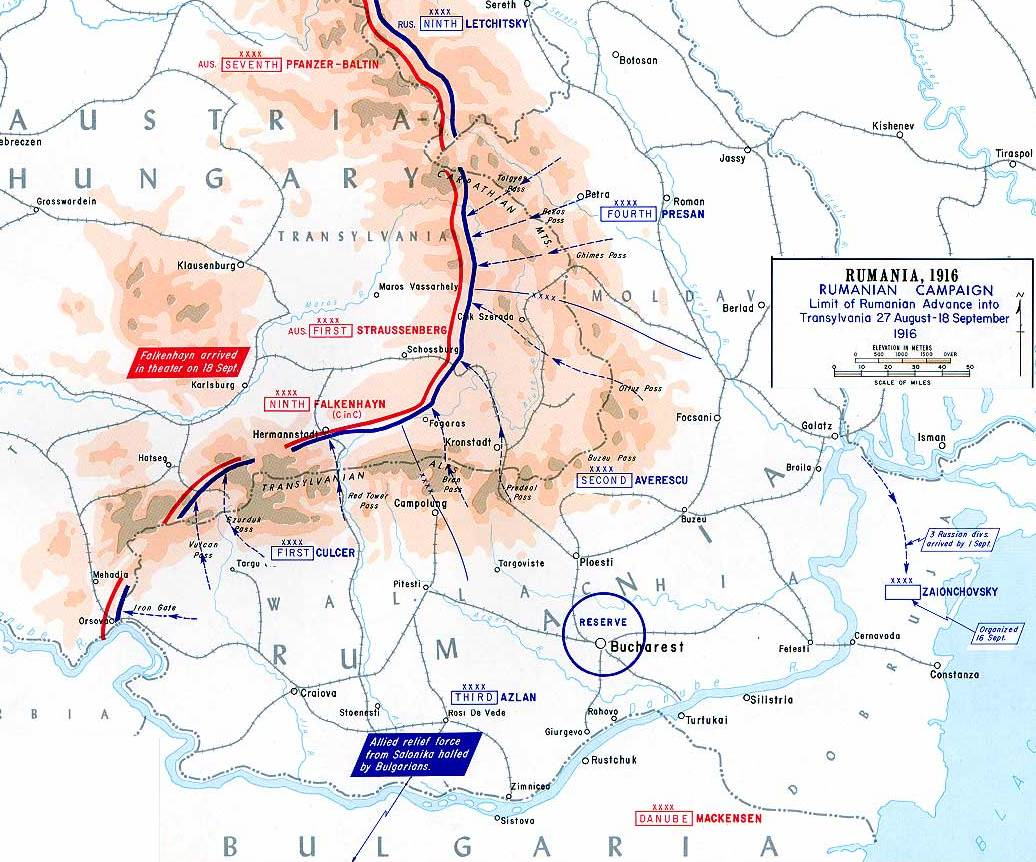
Romanian invasion of Austria-Hungary, August 1916

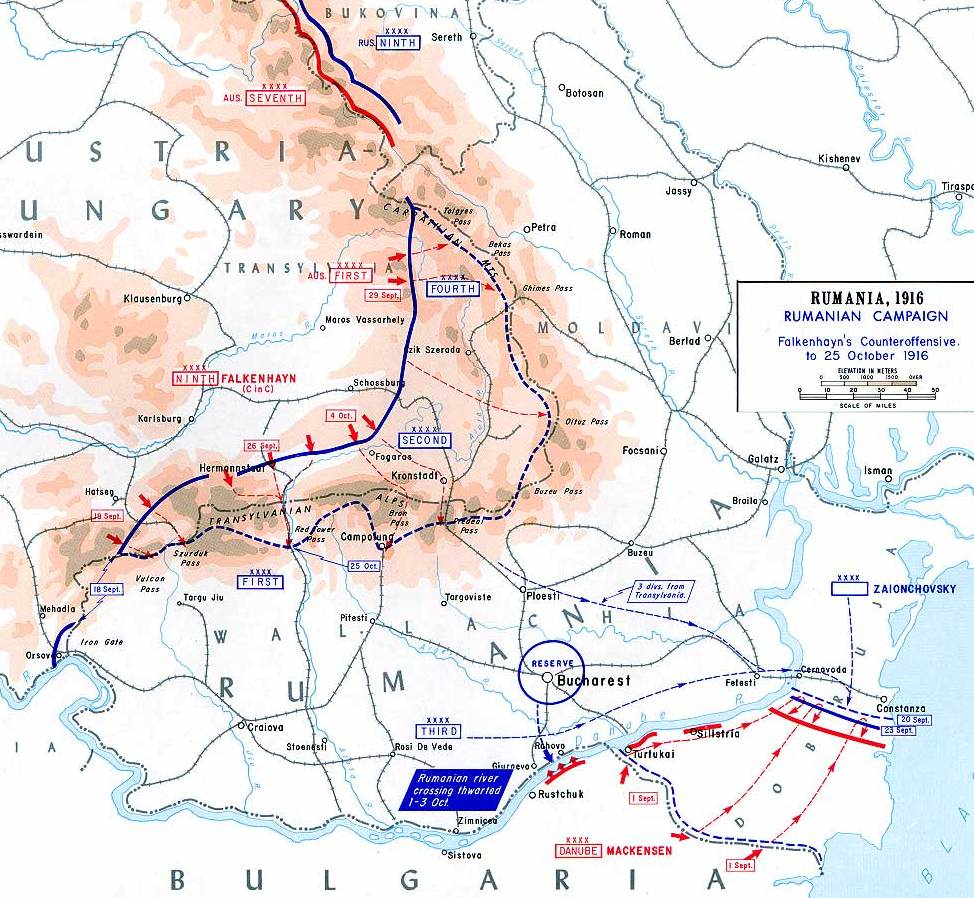
Central Powers counterattack, September–October 1916

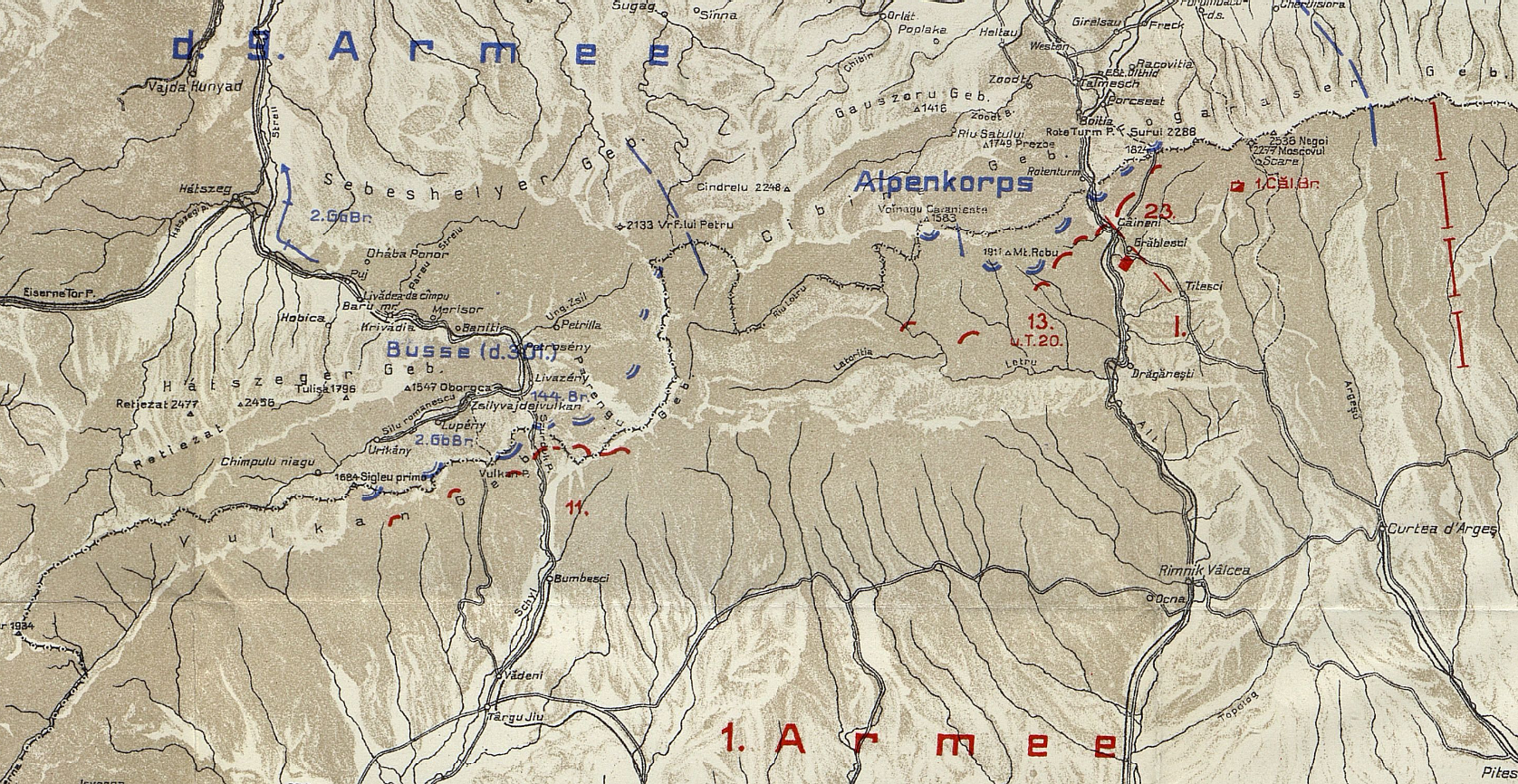
Operations on the front of the Romanian 1st Army during the ending phase of the Battle of Transylvania (6 - 14 October)

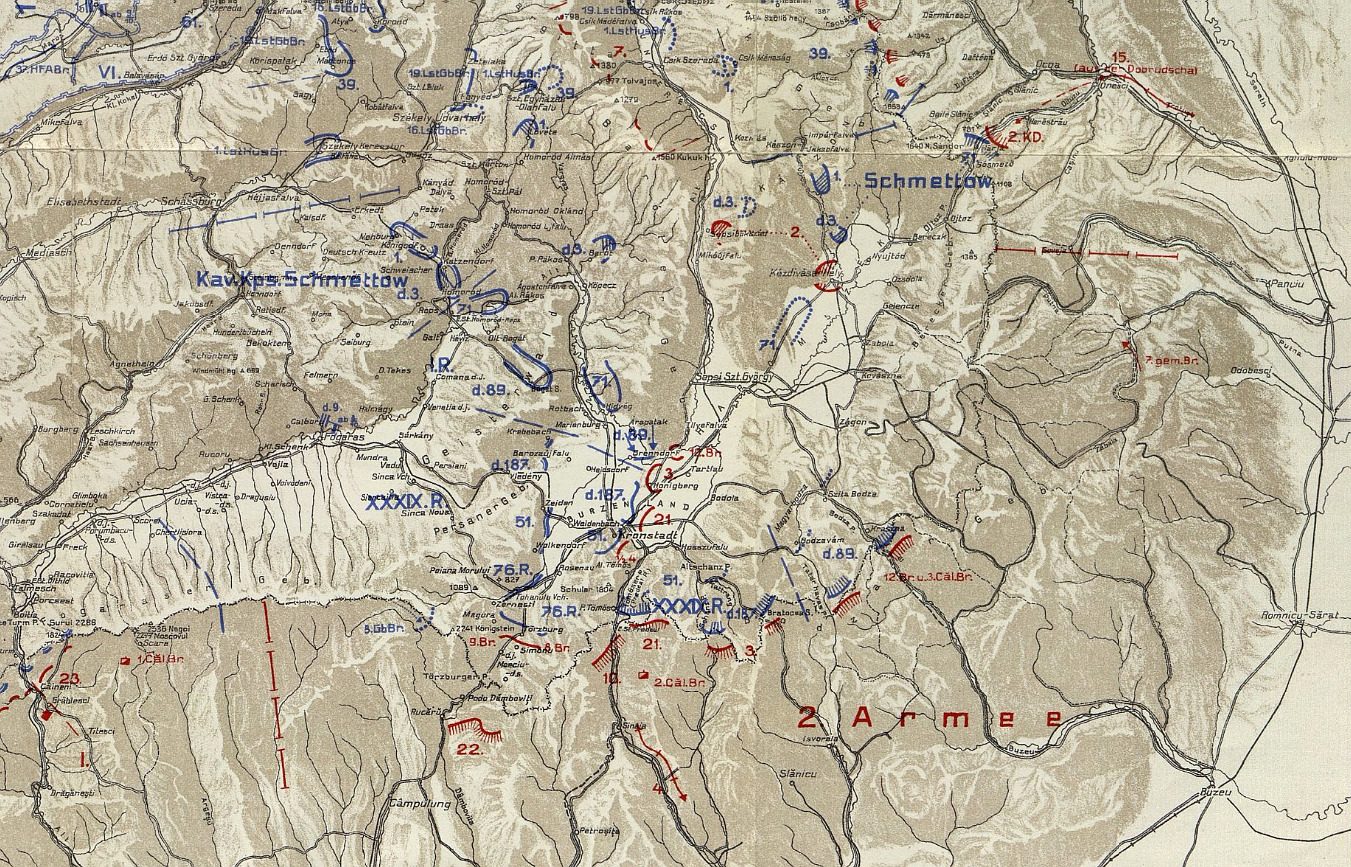
Operations on the front of the Romanian 2nd Army during the ending phase of the Battle of Transylvania (6 - 14 October)

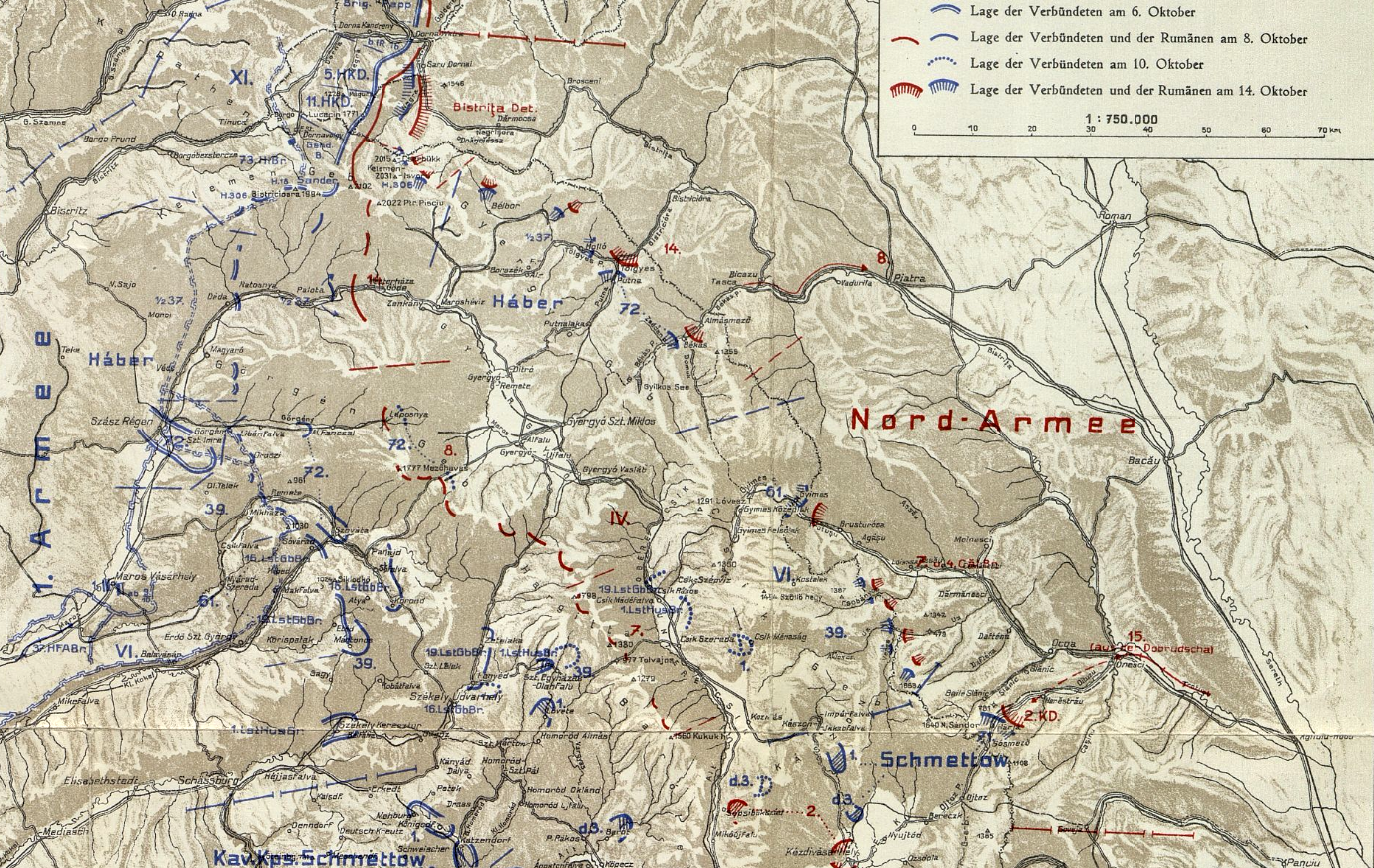
Operations on the front of the Romanian North Army during the ending phase of the Battle of Transylvania (6 - 14 October) Note that the Romanians still held the town of Kézdivásárhely as late as 14 October; the town is shown at the extreme south of the map, surrounded by Romanian positions (thick red lines)

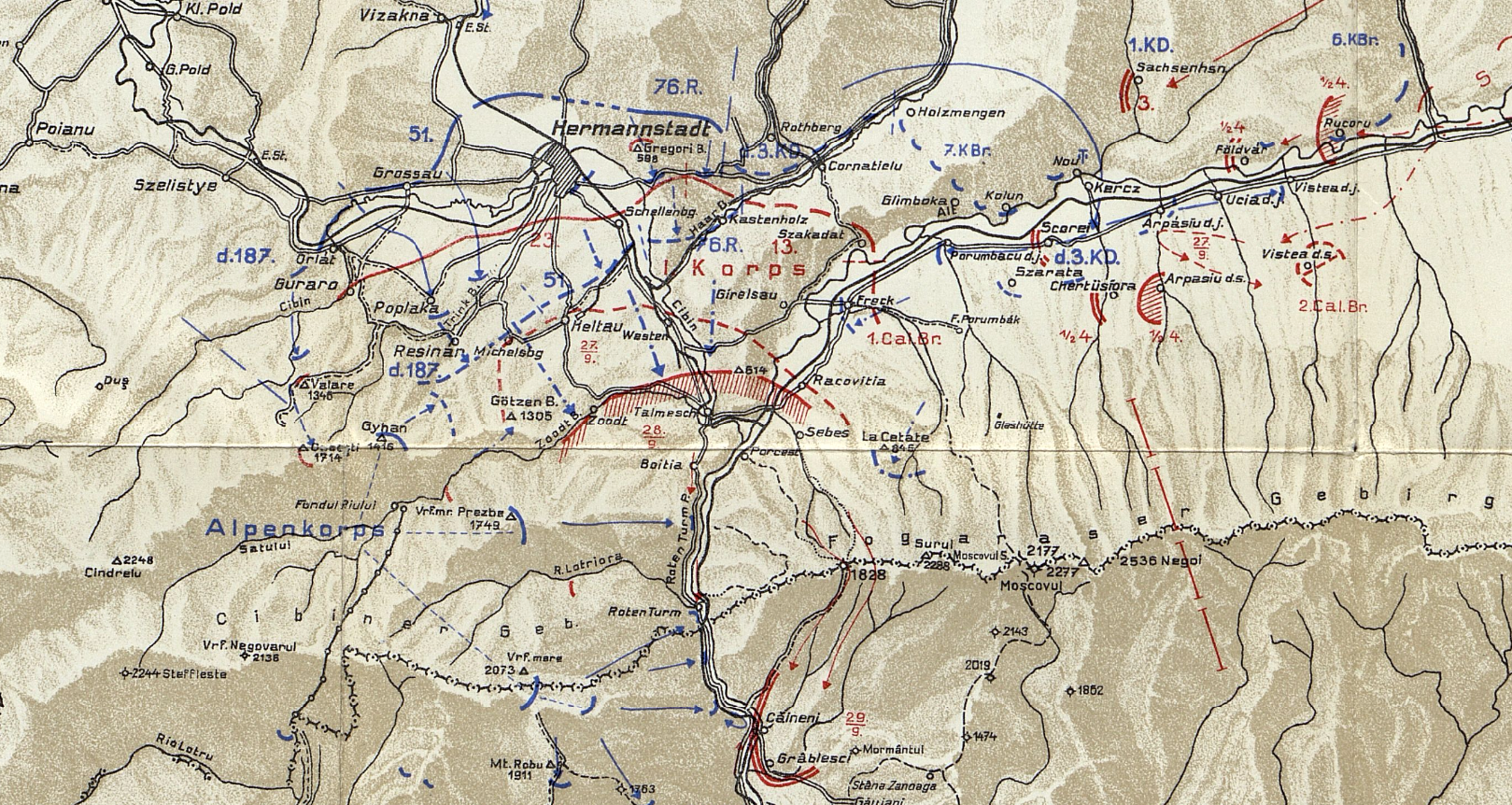
Battle of Sibiu

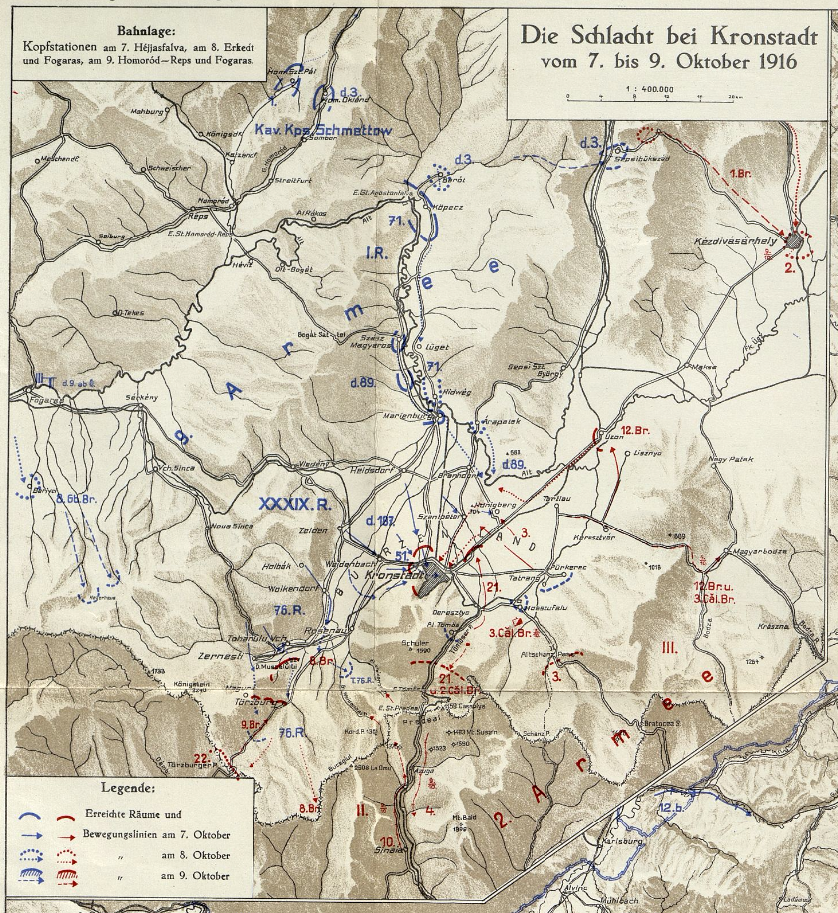
Battle of Brasov (Also note the operations at Kézdivásárhely in the northeast of the map: two Romanian units retreating from the north and northwest and forming a defensive perimeter around the town on 8–9 October)

== See also ==
- Treceți, batalioane române, Carpații
