= Battle of Báránykút =

World War I battle

- Part of the Battle of Transylvania of the Romanian Campaign of World War I
Date	2 October 1916
Location	West of Báránykút, Kőhalom District, Nagy-Küküllő county, Transylvania, Austria-Hungary (today Bărcuț, Brașov County, Romania)
Result	Romanian victory

Belligerents
Romania	German Empire; Nominal only: Austria-Hungary

Commanders and leaders
(Kingdom of Romania) Grigore Crăiniceanu	(German Empire) Curt von Morgen

Units involved
2nd Army (half-strength): 3rd Division; 6th Division; Elements from two more divisions	1st Austro-Hungarian Army: I Reserve Corps; 89th German Division

Strength
30 battalions	13 battalions

Casualties and losses
Unknown	800 prisoners 8 machine guns

The Battle of Báránykút was a military engagement during the Battle of Transylvania, at the beginning of the Romanian Campaign of World War I. It consisted of a German offensive that was successfully repulsed by the Romanians, who then carried out a largely unhindered tactical retreat.

== Background ==
In late September, a Romanian pilot landed behind the German lines and was taken prisoner. The message he carried revealed the location of a relief column which was supposed to come in the aid of the battered Olt Corps. On 29 September, General Erich von Falkenhayn (the overall Central Powers commander in Transylvania) issued orders to strike against this threat, which was represented by the Romanian 2nd Army. For this operation, he planned to attack along the valley of the Olt River, using the XXXIX Reserve Corps and the I Reserve Corps (German 89th Infantry Division and Austro-Hungarian 71st Infantry Division), supported by cavalry. The Second Romanian Army, under General Grigore C. Crăiniceanu, had its forces halved in mid-September, when three of its divisions were shifted South. The I Reserve Corps was part of the Austro-Hungarian 1st Army at the time of the battle. The Romanians had a decisive numerical advantage: 30 battalions against 13. Kőhalom (Rupea/Reps) was the district capital of the eponymous district of the Nagy-Küküllő County. The town was taken by the 2nd Romanian Army on 16 September. The village of Báránykút (Bărcuț/Bekokten) was taken by the Romanian 2nd Army on 28 September.

== Battle ==
On 2 October, General Curt von Morgen attacked the Romanian 3rd and 6th Divisions northwest of Kőhalom. The German 89th Division, composed largely of older men from the Berlin area, took a beating and fell back. The 89th Infantry Division attacked in the direction of Báránykút (Bărcuț/Bekokten) and initially saw great success, rapidly overcoming Romanian defences north of the Olt. Unfortunately for the Central Powers, the 71st Austro-Hungarian Infantry Division failed to keep up with the German division, on account of the softness of the chalky roads after rain. Thus, the 71st Division's artillery was not yet in position, exposing the latter's flank to a determined counterattack by elements of four Romanian infantry divisions. Amidst horn blows and loud shouts, the 89th Infantry Division was thrown off the heights in a bayonet attack within moments. The German columns streamed back, pursued by the triumphant Romanians. Reserves were dispatched but they were scattered by Romanian artillery before they could provide any aid. Every attempt by the 89th Division to take up a firm position was in vain, as Romanian masses pressed incessantly against its thinned ranks. Powerless to hold back this Romanian assault, the Germans fell back to Hégen (Brădeni) and Jakabfalva (Iacobeni). Eventually, the Romanian troops ceased their pursuit. They gathered their prisoners, captured weapons and other war booty and pulled back to the high ground behind them. The Romanian charge threatened to sweep away the German line, and only lack of reserves caused the attack to be called off. By the end of the day, after having suffered heavy losses, the Germans were back at their line of departure. German cavalry to the south also ran into determined resistance and failed to make any progress. German leadership doubted that the positions of the I Reserve Corps' two divisions could be held if the Romanians attacked again. However, to the surprise of the German commanders, the Romanians did not exploit their success against the I Reserve Corps. Instead, they used this check that they had inflicted against the Germans to withdraw to the east, pursued by the XXXIX Corps and the German Cavalry (Kavalleriekorps Schmettow). Nonetheless, the unexpected Romanian withdrawal prevented the Germans from pinning down their opponents. The Berlin report of 2 October acknowledged the Romanian success. The Romanian units captured 800 German prisoners and 8 machine guns.

== Aftermath ==
The Germans pursued the Romanians as they retreated, reaching the eastern end of Bucsum (Bucium). There, a German artillery battery was ordered to fire on the railway station at Ósinka (Șinca), where a locomotive was just departing. The German guns could not find their range, however. They fired in vain at the train, first at a range of 5,500 meters, then at 6,000 meters before a final attempt at 6,300 meters. The regimental commander ordered the battery to gallop behind the village and take up positions to fire on the train. The battery galloped frantically: limbers were thrown about, the observers' wagon was often on two wheels, the battery's vehicles racing out of the village. Shortly after leaving the village, an ammunition wagon overturned, its gunners flying into the air over the roadside ditch into a field. Despite the battery's best efforts, the train had vanished from their sight. However, after climbing a hill, the battery spotted a lot of Romanian infantry and supply wagons moving towards the Geisterwald from the village of Ósinka. Panic erupted in the midst of the Romanian troops and their horses as the first shells landed. The Romanians counterattacked, and despite being driven from the hill twice, they pressed on their assault as soon as German fire ceased. A Romanian battery opened fire as well, but the duel was brief, as the Germans had run out of ammunition by then. The German battery was saved by the arrival of supporting infantry, which it had overtaken one hour prior.

The largest settlement involved in the operations was Fogaras (Făgăraș). Crăiniceanu's 2nd Army had taken the town – capital of Fogaras County – on 16 September. However, in accordance with the general Romanian withdrawal from the region, Crăiniceanu fell back from Fogaras on 4 October.

The Romanian victory at Kőhalom checked the Germans long enough to ensure an almost uncontested Romanian withdrawal, save for the efforts of one German battery which had overtaken its infantry by an hour. The Germans encountered new Romanian defenses only late on 4 October, along the Western slopes of the Perșani Ridge (Hungarian: Persányi-hegység), in a forest known to the Germans and Austrians as the Geisterwald. Here, a new battle would begin early on 5 October. Kőhalom was taken by the 71st Austro-Hungarian Division during the late night of 5 October, after battling the retreating Romanians in the heights north of the town. Further to the southwest, the German 89th Division resumed its advance that same day, crossing the Olt unopposed.

Despite the small number of Romanian prisoners during the retreat (or at least, small compared to comparable German battles against the Russians), General Grigore C. Crăiniceanu was dismissed from the command of the 2nd Army and replaced by Alexandru Averescu.

On 4 October, the Austro-Hungarian 1st Army transferred von Morgen's I Corps, with its two divisions, to von Falkenhayn's 9th Army. Austria-Hungary was, on paper, heavily involved in this battle, but in actuality its own forces did nothing. Its 1st Army controlled von Morgen's I Reserve Corps, which comprised both a German infantry division (the 89th) and an Austro-Hungarian infantry division (the 71st). However, the two divisions advanced in parallel, with the Austro-Hungarian one apparently lagging behind. Its failure to advance alongside the German 89th Division was the very catalyst of the Romanian successful counter-attack. For all intents and purposes, the German 89th Division was on its own during this battle.
