= Szeben County =

County of the Kingdom of Hungary

Szeben County Comitatus Cibinensis (Latin) Szeben vármegye (Hungarian) Komitat Hermannstadt (German) Comitatul Sibiu (Romanian)
- County of the Kingdom of Hungary
- 1876–1920
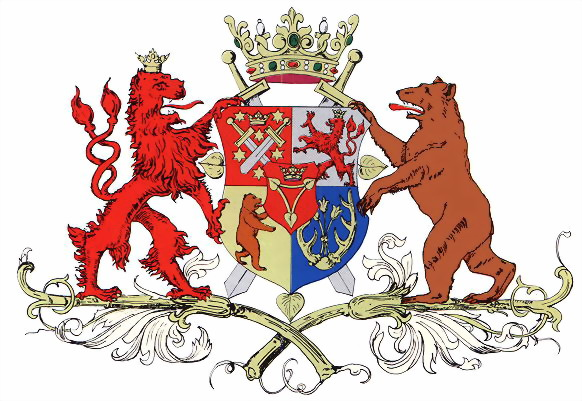
- Coat of arms

- Capital: Nagyszeben
- Area
  - Coordinates: 45°48′N 24°9′E
  - 1910: 3,619 km^{2} (1,397 sq mi)
- Population
  - 1910: 176,900
- History
  - Established: 1876
  - Treaty of Trianon: 4 June 1920
- Today part of: Romania
- Sibiu is the current name of the capital.

Szeben was an administrative county (comitatus) of the Kingdom of Hungary. Its territory is now in central Romania (southern Transylvania). The capital of the county was Nagyszeben (present-day Sibiu).

== Geography ==
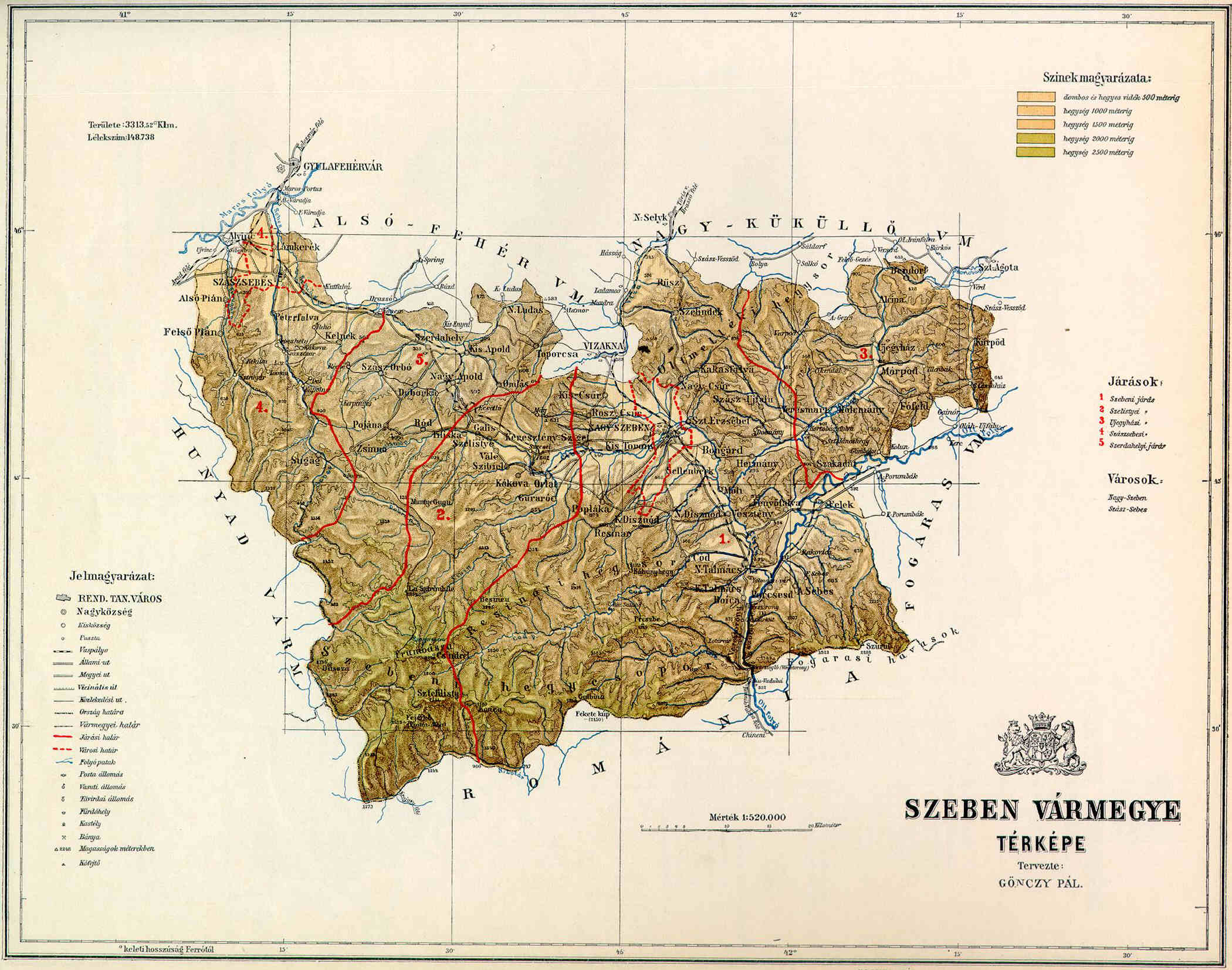
Map of Szeben County, 1891.

Szeben County shared borders with Romania and the Hungarian counties Hunyad, Alsó-Fehér, Nagy-Küküllő, and Fogaras. The river Olt flowed through the county. Its area was 3,619 km^{2} (1,397 sq mi) around 1910.

== History ==
Szeben County was formed in 1876, when the administrative structure of Transylvania was changed. It included the former Saxon seats of Hermannstadt/Sibiu, Mühlbach/Sebeș, Reussmarkt/Miercurea, and (most of) Nocrich, as well as parts of Alsó-Fehér and Felső-Fehér counties. In 1920, by the Treaty of Trianon, the county became part of Romania. Its territory lies in the present Romanian counties Sibiu and Alba (the area around Sebeș).

== Demographics ==
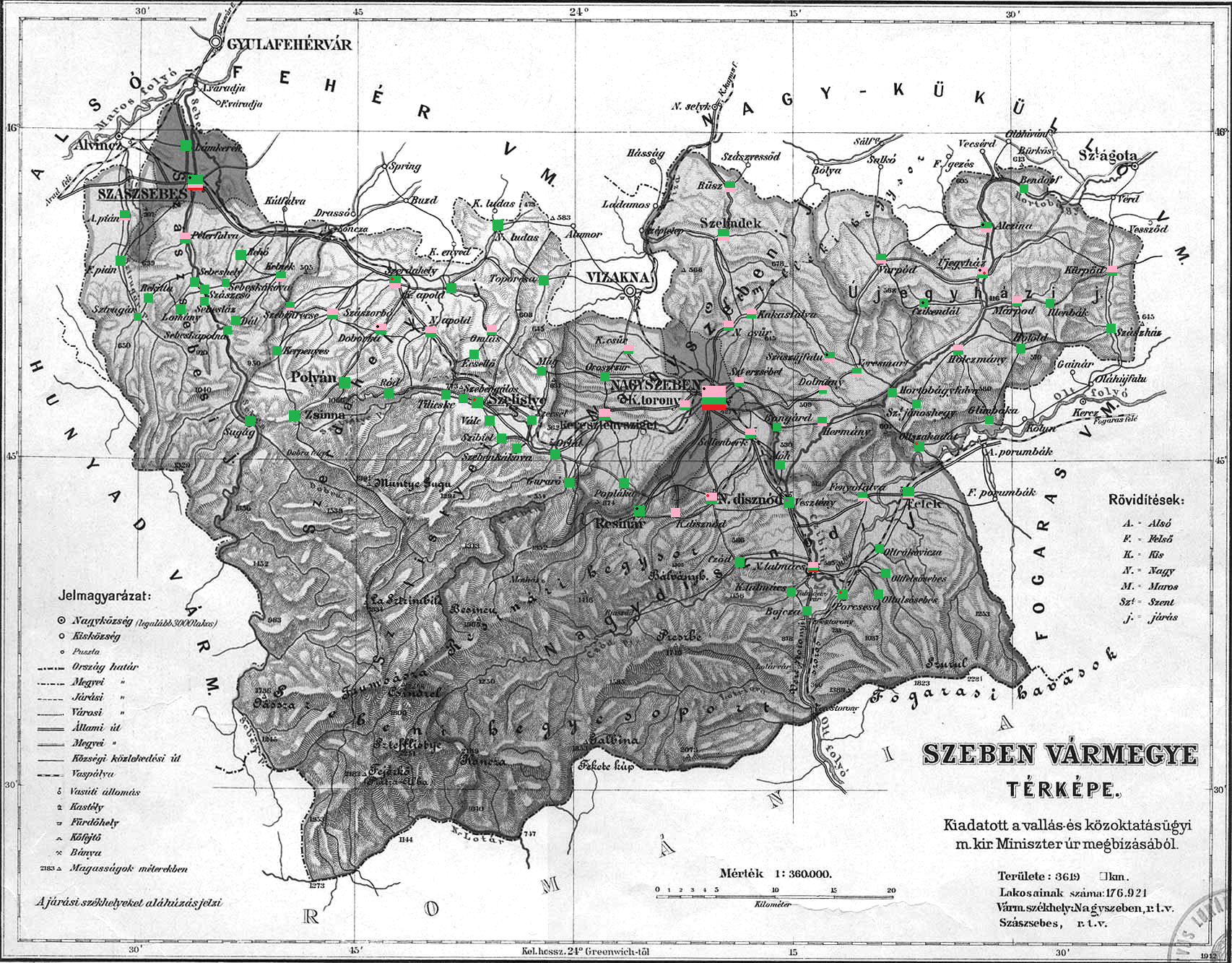
Ethnic map of the county with data of the 1910 census (see the key in the description)

Population by mother tongue (Note: Only linguistic communities > 1% are displayed.)
| Census | Total | Romanian | German | Hungarian | Other or unknown |
|---|---|---|---|---|---|
| 1880 | 141,627 | 90,802 (66.27%) | 40,723 (29.72%) | 2,991 (2.18%) | 2,497 (1.82%) |
| 1890 | 148,738 | 98,719 (66.37%) | 42,497 (28.57%) | 4,342 (2.92%) | 3,180 (2.14%) |
| 1900 | 166,188 | 108,413 (65.24%) | 47,678 (28.69%) | 8,084 (4.86%) | 2,013 (1.21%) |
| 1910 | 176,921 | 113,672 (64.25%) | 49,757 (28.12%) | 10,159 (5.74%) | 3,333 (1.88%) |

Population by religion (Note: Only religious communities > 1% are displayed.)
| Census | Total | Eastern Orthodox | Lutheran | Greek Catholic | Roman Catholic | Calvinist | Other or unknown |
|---|---|---|---|---|---|---|---|
| 1880 | 141,627 | 90,553 (63.94%) | 33,781 (23.85%) | 10,853 (7.66%) | 4,680 (3.30%) | 1,110 (0.78%) | 650 (0.47%) |
| 1890 | 148,738 | 88,365 (59.41%) | 39,065 (26.26%) | 12,550 (8.44%) | 6,414 (4.31%) | 1,586 (1.07%) | 758 (0.51%) |
| 1900 | 166,188 | 95,380 (57.39%) | 43,439 (26.14%) | 14,050 (8.45%) | 8,747 (5.26%) | 3,147 (1.89%) | 1,425 (0.86%) |
| 1910 | 176,921 | 99,952 (56.50%) | 45,912 (25.95%) | 16,064 (9.08%) | 9,503 (5.37%) | 3,528 (1.99%) | 1,962 (1.11%) |

== Subdivisions ==
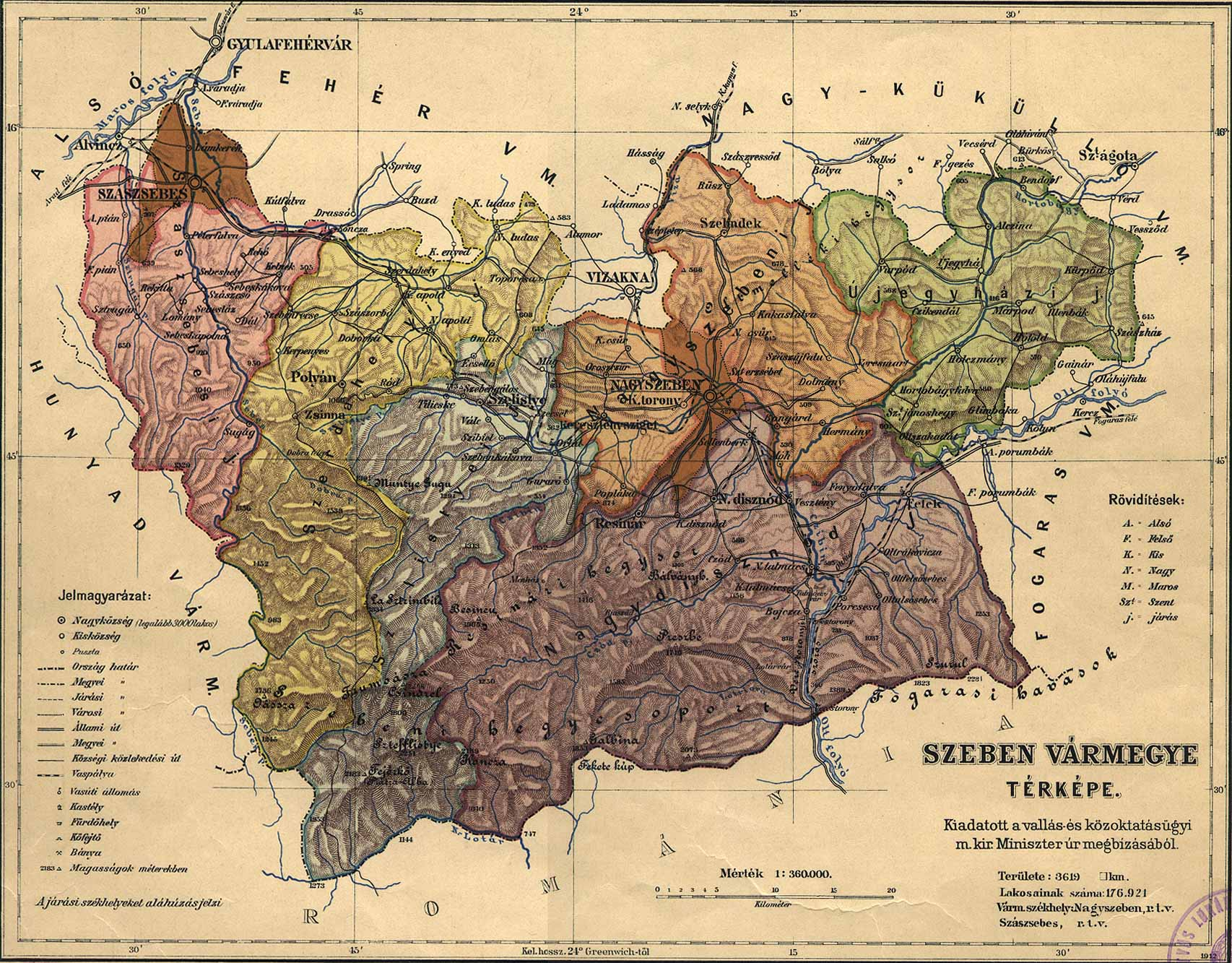

In the early 20th century, the subdivisions of Szeben county were:

Districts (járás)
| District | Capital |
|---|---|
| Nagydisznód | Nagydisznód (now Cisnădie) |
| Nagyszeben | Nagyszeben (now Sibiu) |
| Szászsebes | Szászsebes (now Sebeș) |
| Szelistye | Szelistye (now Săliște) |
| Szerdahely | Szerdahely (now Miercurea Sibiului) |
| Újegyház | Újegyház (now Nocrich) |
Urban districts (rendezett tanácsú város)
Nagyszeben (now Sibiu)
Szászsebes (now Sebeș)
