= Grigore C. Crăiniceanu =

Romanian general (1852 - 1932)

General Grigore C. Crăiniceanu
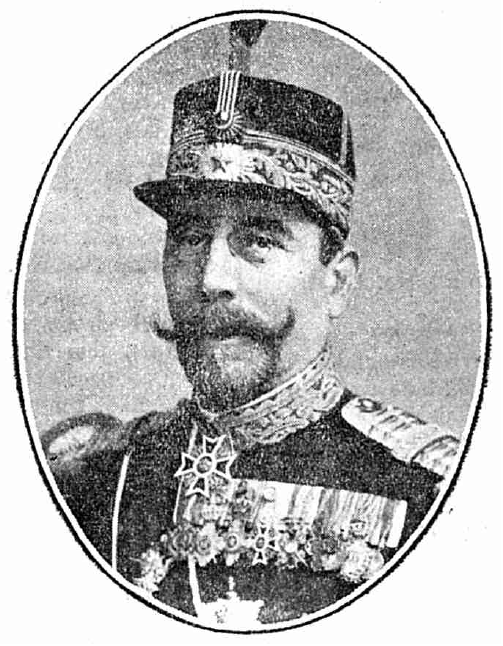
- Crăiniceanu as War Minister in 1910

13th Chief of the Romanian General Staff
- In office 1 April 1907 – 1 November 1909
- Monarch: Carol I
- Prime Minister: Dimitrie Sturdza; Ion I. C. Brătianu
- Preceded by: Nicolae Tătărăscu
- Succeeded by: Ioan Istrati

33rd Minister of War of Kingdom of Romania
- In office 1 November 1909 – 28 December 1910
- Prime Minister: Ion I. C. Brătianu
- Preceded by: Toma Stelian
- Succeeded by: Nicolae Filipescu

Personal details
- Born: July 9, 1852 Bucharest, Wallachia
- Died: October 1, 1935 (aged 83)
- Children: Constantin Crăiniceanu

Military service
- Branch/service: Romanian Land Forces
- Rank: divisional general
- Battles/wars: Romanian War of Independence; World War I

Grigore C. Crăiniceanu (9 July 1852, Bucharest – 1 October 1935) was a Romanian military officer.

He participated in the Romanian War of Independence. From 1904 to 1907, he was inspector general of military engineers. From 1907 to 1909, Crăiniceanu was Chief of the Romanian General Staff. In 1909, he was promoted to divisional general. From November 1909 to December 1910, he served as War Minister in the cabinet of Ion I. C. Brătianu. In 1911, he was elected a titular member of the Romanian Academy.

From 1911 to 1913, he commanded the Second Army Corps. Sent into reserve in 1913, he was recalled to active duty upon Romania's entry into World War I, commanding the Second Army during the Battle of Transylvania, from August 25 to September 25, 1916. Then, from 1916 to 1917, Crăiniceanu was inspector general of the army. His son, Lieutenant colonel Constantin Crăiniceanu, was allegedly recruited by the German secret service while he was the Romanian military attaché in Athens (1914–1916) and was executed for treason in April 1917 after he had attempted desertion to the Germans, as part of a plot masterminded by Colonel Alexandru D. Sturdza, the son of the former prime minister Dimitrie Sturdza.

Crăiniceanu founded two magazines, Revista Armatei and Cercul publicațiilor militare.

== Notes ==
5."Durchleuchtung eines Verrats. Der Fall des Oberst Alexandru D.Sturdza", von Petre Otu und Maria Georgescu. Lektor Verlag, Hainburg 2022.ISBN 9783941866089
