= Treceți, batalioane române, Carpații =

Romanian patriotic song

"Treceți, batalioane române, Carpații" (transl. "Cross, Romanian battalions, the Carpathians") is a Romanian patriotic song. It is thought to have been composed in 1916, shortly before Romania's entry into World War I, although its first historical apparition occurred in February 1919, when members of the Romanian Legion of Transylvanian–Bukovinian Volunteers were recorded singing a version of the song. The original version (with 3 stanzas) is about how Romanian soldiers say goodbye to their families and go to Transylvania to fight against the Austro-Hungarian Empire for the unification of the region with the Kingdom of Romania.

The song was later "revived" in the 1970s and 1980s, when Adrian Păunescu and other poets added more stanzas and made the song part of the repertory of the spectacles of Cenaclul Flacăra, an artistic and cultural movement of the time. This ended up making the song more popular during the communist period.

There is a theory that the author was possibly Iosif Romulus Botto, who composed around 30 other choirs and fanfares about Transylvania and Banat during the interwar period. However, he was only 12 in the year 1916, making it unlikely if the song was indeed composed at that time.

This song is similar to "Szara piechota" ("Gray uniformed infantry"), a Polish patriotic song reportedly from either 1918 or 1927.

== Lyrics ==
The lyrics are as follows:

=== Original version (World War I) ===
Treceți, batalioane române, Carpații
La arme cu frunze și flori
V-așteaptă izbânda, v-așteaptă și frații
Cu inima la trecători

Ardealul, Ardealul, Ardealul ne cheamă
Nădejdea e numai la noi
Sărută-ți, copile, părinții și frații
Și-apoi să mergem la război

Nainte, 'nainte cu sabia-n mână
Hotarul nedrept să-l zdrobim
Să trecem Carpații, ne trebuie Ardealul
De-o fi să ne-ngropăm de vii

Translation:

Cross, Romanian battalions, the Carpathians
To arms with leaves and flowers
Victory is awaiting you, brothers are too
With their hearts in the passes [of the Carpathians]

Transylvania, Transylvania, Transylvania calls us
Hope is only in us
Kiss, boy, your parents and siblings
And then let's go to war

Forward, forward with swords in our hands
Let's crush the unfair border
Let's cross the Carpathians, we need Transylvania
Even if we have to be buried alive

=== Cenaclul Flacăra version (1970s–1980s) ===
Un cântec istoric ne-aduce aminte
Că frații în veci vor fi frați
Un cântec de luptă bătrân ca Unirea
Voi, compatrioți, ascultați:

Treceți, batalioane române, Carpații
La arme cu frunze și flori
V-așteaptă izbânda, v-așteaptă și frații
Cu inima la trecători

Ardealul, Ardealul, Ardealul ne cheamă
Nădejdea e numai la noi
Sărută-ți, copile, părinții și frații
Și-apoi să mergem la război

Nainte, 'nainte spre marea Unire
Hotarul nedrept să-l zdrobim
Să trecem Carpații, ne trebuie Ardealul
De-o fi se ne-ngropăm de vii

Nu săbii făcură Unirea, ci inimi
Spre Alba cu toții mergeam
Toți oamenii țării semnau întregirea
Voința întregului neam

Cu toții eram regimente române
Moldova, Muntenia, Ardeal
Fireasca Unire cu patria-mumă
Ne-a fost cel mai drept ideal

Aceasta-i povestea Ardealului nostru
Și-a neamului nostru viteaz
Istoria-ntreagă cu lupte și jerfe
Trăiește-n Unirea de azi

Dreptatea și pacea veghează Carpații
Și țara e frunze și flori
A noastră-i izbânda, ai noștri sunt frații
Trăiască în veci trei culori

Vrem liniște-n țară și pace în lume
Dar dac-ar veni vreun blestem
Carpații și frații sări-vor ca unul
Urmând comandantul suprem

Treceți, batalioane române, Carpații
La arme cu frunze și flori
V-așteaptă izbânda, v-așteaptă și frații
Cu inima la trecători

Translation:

A historical song reminds us
That brothers will always be brothers
A war song as old as the Union
Come, compatriots, listen:

Cross, Romanian battalions, the Carpathians
To arms with leaves and flowers
Victory is awaiting you, brothers are too
With their hearts in the mountain passes

Transylvania, Transylvania, Transylvania calls us
Hope is only in us
Kiss, boy, your parents and siblings
And then let's go to war

Forward, forward to the Great Union
Let's crush the unfair border
Let's cross the Carpathians, we need Transylvania
Even if we have to be buried alive

Not with swords they completed the Union, but with hearts
Towards Alba we all went
Every compatriot signed for the Union
The will of the entire nation

With all we were Romanian regiments
Moldavia, Muntenia, Transylvania
The natural Union with our motherland
It was our most just ideal

The is the story of our Transylvania
And of our brave nation
A history full of struggle and sacrifices
Lives on in today's Union

Justice and peace protect the Carpathians
And the country is of leaves and flowers
Ours is victory, brothers are ours
Long live the three colors forever

We want quiet in the country and peace in the world
But if a curse came
Carpathians and brothers will jump as one
Following the supreme commander

Cross, Romanian battalions, the Carpathians
To arms with leaves and flowers
Victory is awaiting you, brothers are too
With their hearts in the mountain passes
