= Second Army (Romania) =

- Armata a 2-a
- Active: 18 August 1916 – June 1947; 1960 – 2000
- Country: Romania
- Branch: Romanian Land Forces
- Anniversaries: 18 August
- Engagements: World War I; Battle of Transylvania; Battle of Mărăști; Battle of Mărășești; Battle of Oituz; World War II

Commanders
- Notable commanders: Marshal Alexandru Averescu; General Grigore C. Crăiniceanu; General Artur Văitoianu; General Nicolae Ciupercă

The Second Army (Romanian: Armata a 2-a) was a field army of the Romanian Land Forces, created on 18 August 1916. Its successor is the 2nd Infantry Division.

== History ==
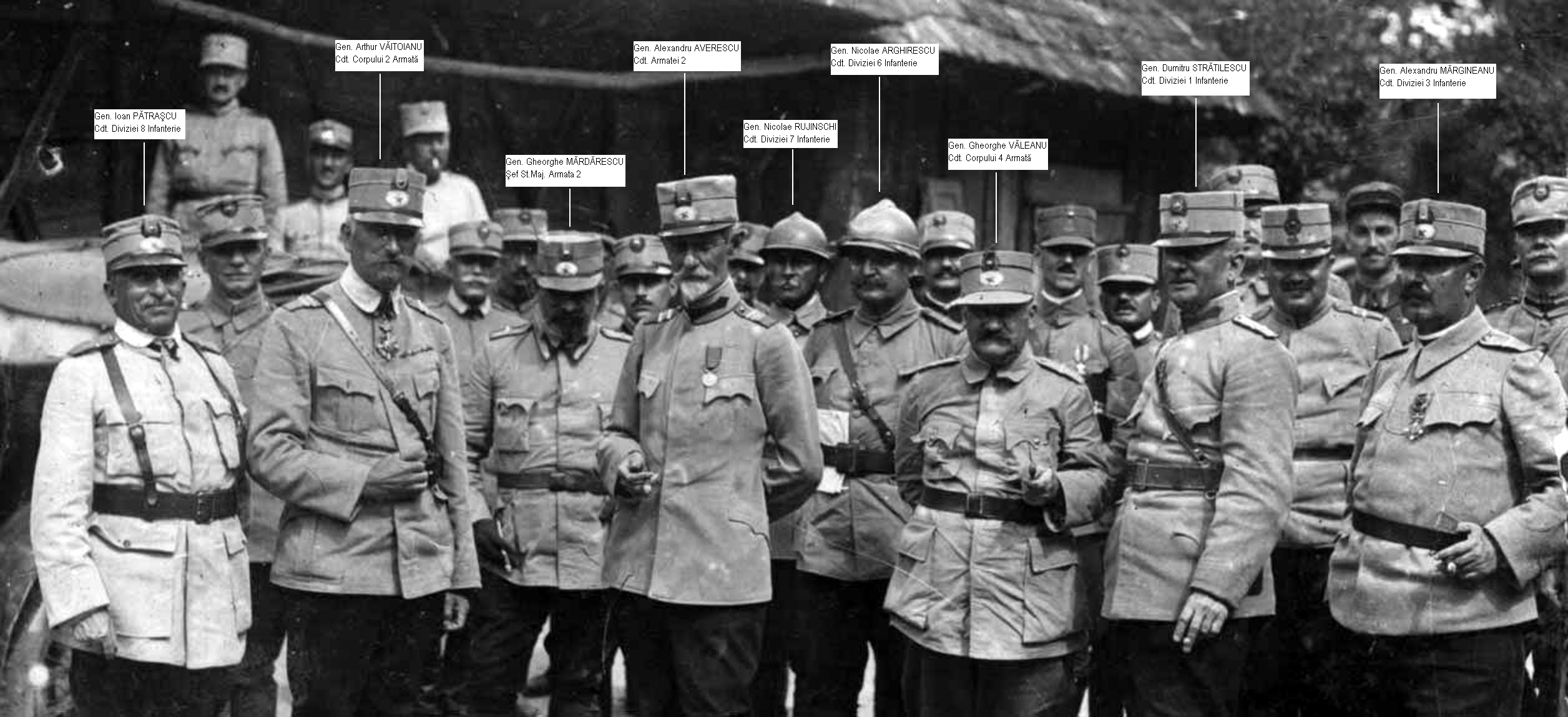
Generals of the Second Army in 1917

=== World War I ===
The Second Army was part of the Romanian offensive in Transylvania during the autumn of 1916. Following the failure of the offensive and due to the Central Powers counterattack, which led to the occupation of most of the country's territory, the Second Army, along with the remnants of other Romanian military units, were forced to retreat into the region of Moldavia, the only Romanian territory unoccupied by enemy forces.

The Second Army, among other units, underwent a process of reorganization and modernization in the winter of 1916–1917 as part of French General Henri Berthelot's mission to revitalize the exhausted and decimated Romanian military.

The Central Powers advance towards Moldavia was hampered by bad weather and poor infrastructure and as a result hostilities were only resumed in the summer of 1917. A plan to break through the lines of Field Marshal August von Mackensen's German forces was elaborated, requiring a dual offensive from the First Army in the Nămoloasa sector and the Second Army in the Mărăști sector. Although the Nămoloasa offensive was canceled, the Second Army's attack led to the Battle of Mărăști, which ended with the Romanians' victory after creating a breach 30 km (19 mi) wide and 20 km (12 mi) deep in the front, after nine days of fighting, between 22 July and 1 August. Field Marshal von Mackensen launched a counterattack on 6 August 1917, which led to the Battle of Mărășești; the Romanians managed to resist against repeated German attacks until 8 September, when both sides ran out of fresh units. Victory came at a great cost, with the Romanians losing over 27,000 men, including 610 officers; the Germans lost 47,000 men. The motto of the Romanian Army during the battle was "Pe aicea nu se trece" (English: "You shall not pass"). At the same time, German and Austro-Hungarian forces launched an attack in the Oituz valley against forces of the Second Army. The Battle of Oituz lasted from 8 August to 22 August 1917 and ended with a Romanian strategic victory, as the Austro-Hungarian forces failed to break through into the Trotuș Valley.

On 1 June 1918, the Second Army was disbanded after Romania was forced to conclude the Treaty of Bucharest with the Central Powers.

=== World War I commanders ===
- Divisional general Alexandru Averescu: 15 August 1916 – 25 August 1916
- Divisional general Grigore C. Crăiniceanu: 25 August 1916 – 25 September 1916
- Divisional general Alexandru Averescu: 25 September 1916 – 1 June 1918

=== World War II ===
The Second Army was briefly reactivated between 20 June and 1 November 1940 during World War II, although it saw limited action. Its commander in those 4 months was major general Nicolae Ciupercă.

=== Cold War to the present ===
In June 1947, the Second Army was once again disbanded and units formerly under its command were transferred to the newly formed 2nd Military Region, headquartered at Bucharest. A similar process of conversion to "Military Regions" was applied to all Romanian Armies after the war. On 5 April 1960, the 2nd Military Region was disbanded and reformed as the 2nd Army Command. In 1980, its headquarters were relocated to Buzău. In 1989, the 2nd Army was under command of general Ion Dândăreanu, and included the 9th "Mărășești" Constanța, 10th "Ștefan cel Mare" Iași and 67th "Siret" Brăila Mechanised Divisions, 32nd Tactical Missile Brigade Tecuci, 2nd Mountain Brigade Brașov and other smaller units.

In 2000, the 2nd Army Command was restructured, becoming the Joint Operational Command, and later simply the Operational Command in 2001. In 2003, it became the 2nd Joint Operational Command Marshal Alexandru Averescu, an army Corps-level unit. In 2008, it was relegated to a division-level unit.

In 2010, the Joint Operational Command Marshal Alexandru Averescu became the 2nd Infantry Division "Getica". This new formation is composed of units formerly under the command of the 1st and 4th Infantry Divisions and is the heraldic successor of the Second Army.
