= Brassó County =

County of the Kingdom of Hungary

Brassó County Comitatus Brassoviensis (Latin) Brassó vármegye (Hungarian) Komitat Kronstadt (German) Comitatul Brașov (Romanian)
- County of the Kingdom of Hungary
- 1876–1920
- Coat of arms

- Capital: Brassó
- Area
  - Coordinates: 45°39′N 25°35′E
  - 1910: 1,492 km^{2} (576 sq mi)
- Population
  - 1910: 101,109
- History
  - Established: 1876
  - Treaty of Trianon: 4 June 1920
- Today part of: Romania
- Brașov is the current name of the capital.

Brassó was an administrative county (comitatus) of the Kingdom of Hungary. Its territory is now in central Romania (south-eastern Transylvania). The capital of the county was Brassó (Brașov in Romanian, Kronstadt in German).

== Geography ==
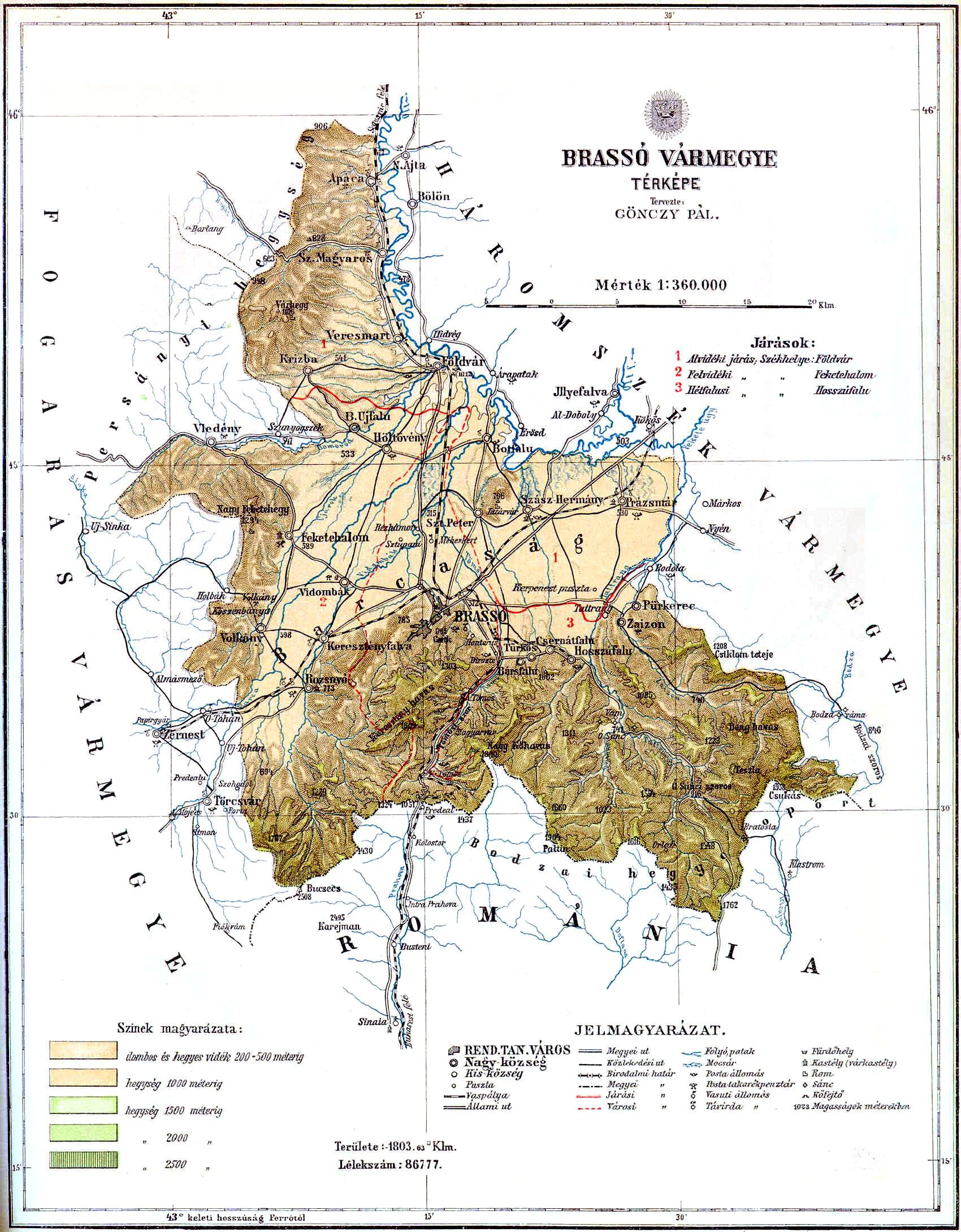
Map of Brassó County, 1891.

Brassó County shared borders with Romania and the Hungarian counties of Fogaras, Nagy-Küküllő, and Háromszék. The river Olt formed part of its northern border. The ridge of the Southern Carpathian Mountains forms its southern border. Its area was 1,492 km^{2} (576 sq mi) around 1910.

== History ==
The Brassó/Kronstadt region was settled by German colonists since the 12th century. Brassó County was formed in 1876, when the administrative structure of Transylvania was changed, and was centered on the former Saxon seat of Kronstadt/Brașov. In 1920, by the Treaty of Trianon, the county became part of Romania. Its territory lies in the present Romanian county of Brașov.

== Demographics ==
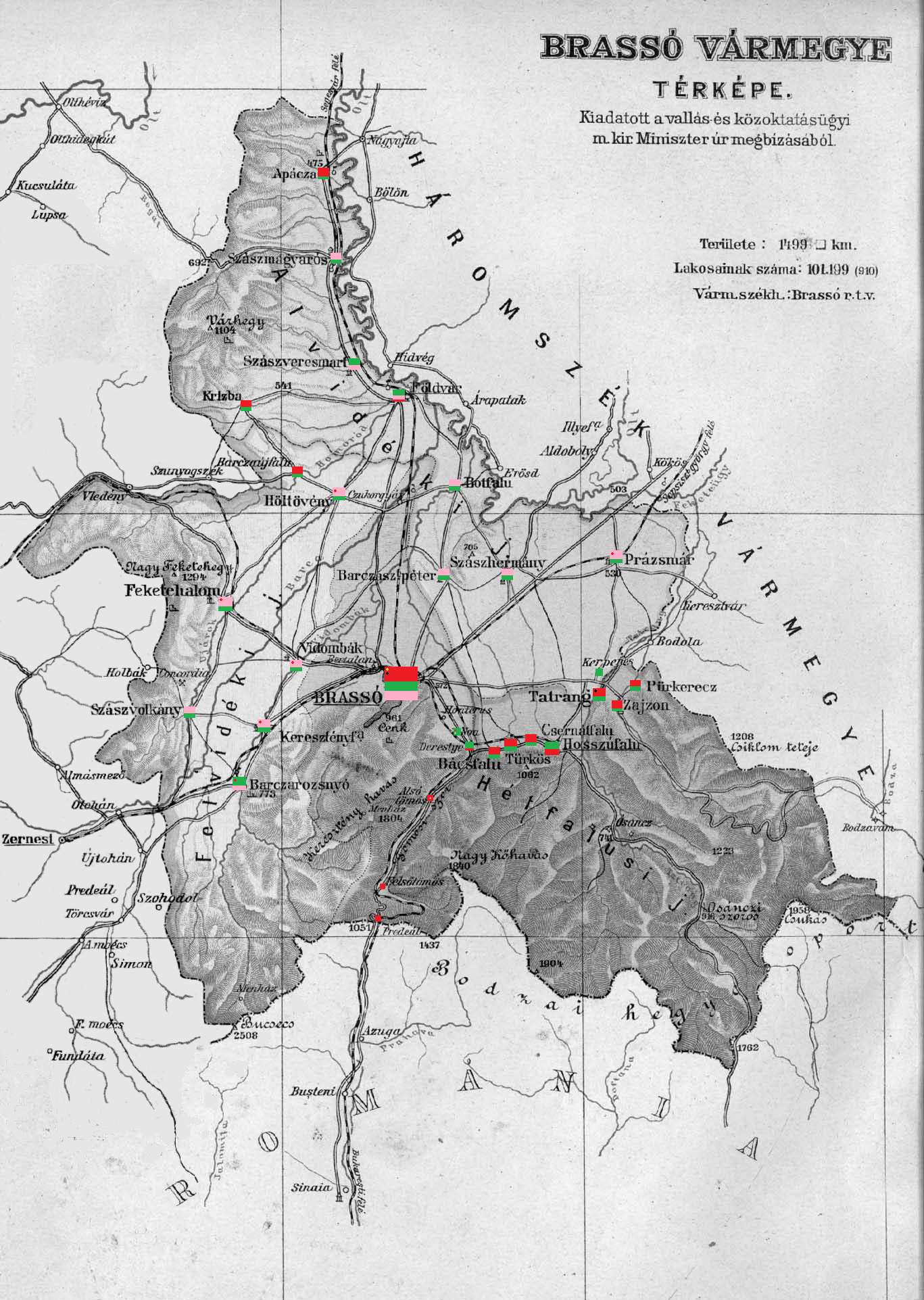
Ethnic map of the county with data of the 1910 census (see the key in the description)

Population by mother tongue (Note: Only linguistic communities > 1% are displayed.)
Census	Total	Hungarian	Romanian	German	Other or unknown
1880	83,929	23,948 (29.62%)	29,250 (36.18%)	26,579 (32.87%)	1,074 (1.33%)
1890	86,777	26,116 (30.10%)	31,106 (35.85%)	27,802 (32.04%)	1,753 (2.02%)
1900	95,565	31,191 (32.64%)	33,886 (35.46%)	29,415 (30.78%)	1,073 (1.12%)
1910	101,199	35,372 (34.95%)	35,091 (34.68%)	29,542 (29.19%)	1,194 (1.18%)

Population by religion (Note: Only religious communities > 1% are displayed.)
Census	Total	Lutheran	Eastern Orthodox	Roman Catholic	Calvinist	Jewish	Unitarian	Greek Catholic	Other or unknown
1880	83,929	39,407 (46.95%)	31,206 (37.18%)	8,541 (10.18%)	3,228 (3.85%)	679 (0.81%)	466 (0.56%)	356 (0.42%)	46 (0.05%)
1890	86,777	39,905 (45.99%)	31,579 (36.39%)	9,837 (11.34%)	3,489 (4.02%)	868 (1.00%)	521 (0.60%)	561 (0.65%)	17 (0.02%)
1900	95,565	42,082 (44.03%)	33,901 (35.47%)	10,675 (11.17%)	5,484 (5.74%)	1,291 (1.35%)	1,030 (1.08%)	1,075 (1.12%)	27 (0.03%)
1910	101,199	42,901 (42.39%)	35,585 (35.16%)	11,886 (11.75%)	6,854 (6.77%)	1,503 (1.49%)	1,441 (1.42%)	979 (0.97%)	50 (0.05%)

== Subdivisions ==
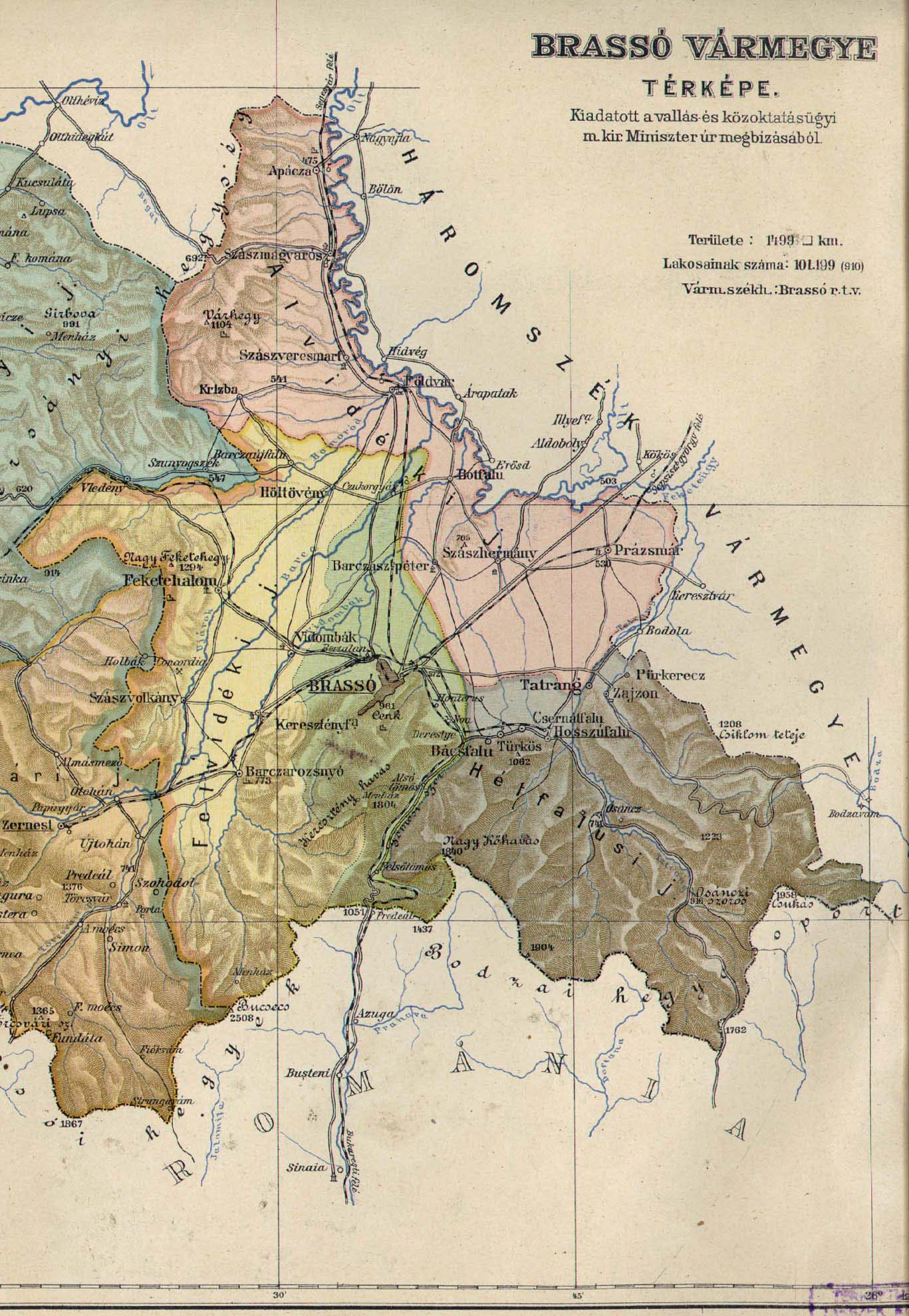

In the early 20th century, the subdivisions of Brassó County were:

Districts (járás)
District	Capital
Alvidék	Földvár (now Feldioara)
Felvidék	Feketehalom (now Codlea) until 1894, then Brassó (now Brașov)
Hétfalu	Hosszúfalu (now Săcele)
Urban districts (rendezett tanácsú város)
Brassó (now Brașov)
