= Nagy-Küküllő County =

Administrative county (comitatus) of the Kingdom of Hungary

Nagy-Küküllő County Comitatus Cuculiensis Maior (Latin) Nagy-Küküllő vármegye (Hungarian) Komitat Groß-Kokelburg (German) Comitatul Târnava-Mare (Romanian)
- County of the Kingdom of Hungary
- 1876–1920
- Coat of arms

- Capital: Segesvár
- Area
  - Coordinates: 46°13′N 24°48′E
  - 1910: 3,337 km^{2} (1,288 sq mi)
- Population
  - 1910: 148,800
- History
  - Established: 1876
  - Treaty of Trianon: 4 June 1920
- Today part of: Romania
- Sighișoara is the current name of the capital.

Nagy-Küküllő (Romanian: Comitatul Târnava-Mare) was an administrative county (comitatus) of the Kingdom of Hungary. Its territory is now in central Romania (central Transylvania). Nagy-Küküllő is the Hungarian name for the river Târnava Mare. The capital of the county was Segesvár (present-day Sighișoara).

== Geography ==
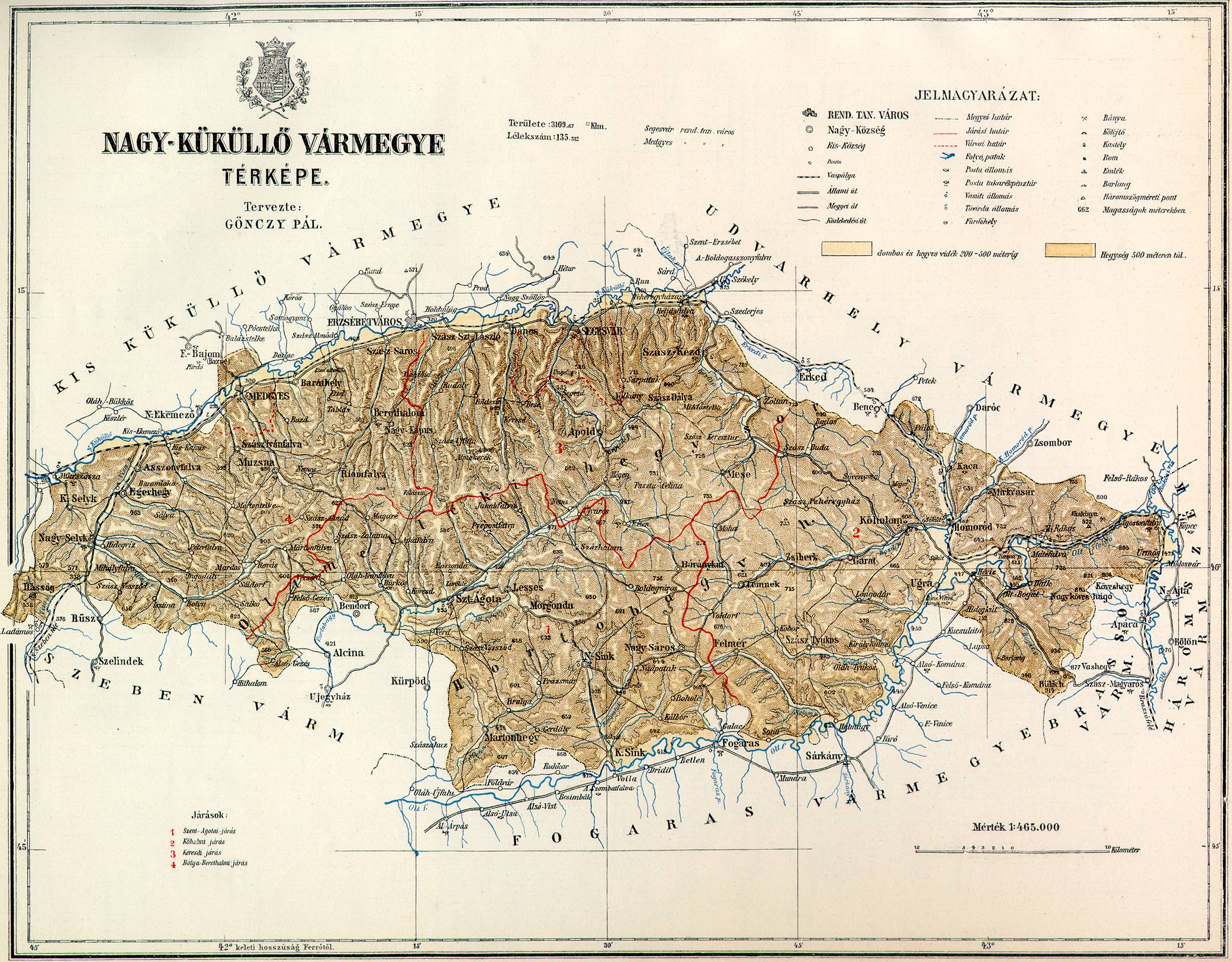
Map of Nagy-Kukullo County, 1891.

Nagy-Küküllő County shared borders with the Hungarian counties Alsó-Fehér, Kis-Küküllő, Udvarhely, Háromszék, Brassó, Fogaras, and Szeben. The river Târnava Mare formed part of its northern border and the river Olt part of its southern border. Its area was 3,337 km^{2} (1,288 sq mi) around 1910.

== History ==
Nagy-Küküllő County came into existence in 1876, when the administrative structure of Transylvania was changed and Küküllő County was split. In 1920, by the Treaty of Trianon, the county became part of Romania. Its territory lies in the present Romanian counties Sibiu (the west), Brașov (the south-east), and Mureș (around Sighișoara).

== Demographics ==
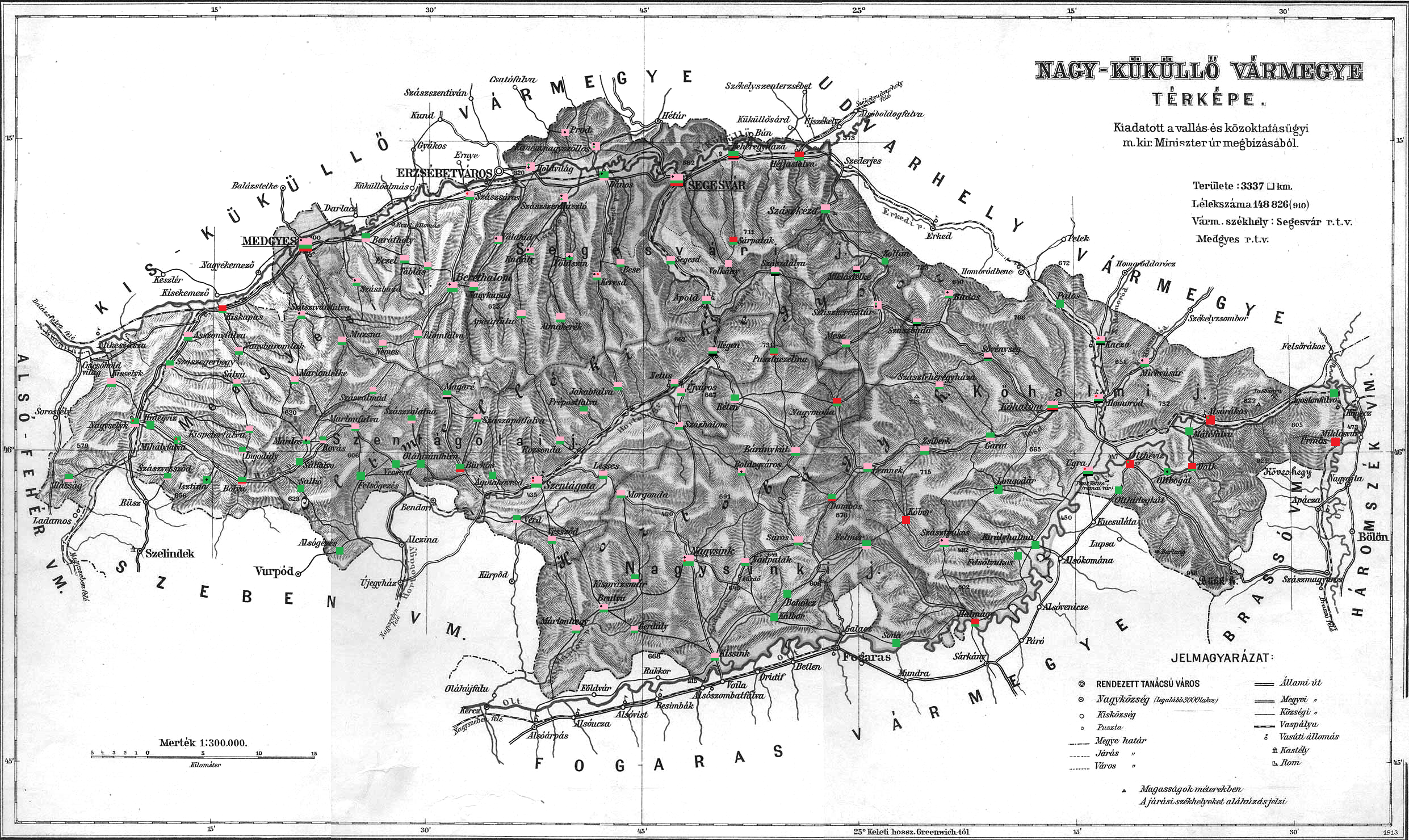
Ethnic map of the county with data of the 1910 census (see the key in the description)

Population by mother tongue (Note: Only linguistic communities > 1% are displayed.)
Census	Total	German	Romanian	Hungarian	Other or unknown
1880	132,454	57,398 (44.77%)	51,632 (40.27%)	12,026 (9.38%)	7,155 (5.58%)
1890	135,312	59,575 (44.03%)	53,644 (39.64%)	14,148 (10.46%)	7,945 (5.87%)
1900	145,138	61,769 (42.56%)	61,779 (42.57%)	17,139 (11.81%)	4,451 (3.07%)
1910	148,826	62,224 (41.81%)	60,381 (40.57%)	18,474 (12.41%)	7,747 (5.21%)

Population by religion (Note: Only religious communities > 1% are displayed.)
Census	Total	Lutheran	Eastern Orthodox	Greek Catholic	Calvinist	Roman Catholic	Unitarian	Other or unknown
1880	132,454	58,920 (44.48%)	45,853 (34.62%)	14,909 (11.26%)	5,999 (4.53%)	3,800 (2.87%)	2,219 (1.68%)	754 (0.57%)
1890	135,312	59,501 (43.97%)	46,209 (34.15%)	15,582 (11.52%)	6,796 (5.02%)	3,856 (2.85%)	2,546 (1.88%)	822 (0.61%)
1900	145,138	61,777 (42.56%)	50,350 (34.69%)	16,259 (11.20%)	7,651 (5.27%)	5,105 (3.52%)	2,889 (1.99%)	1,107 (0.76%)
1910	148,826	62,370 (41.91%)	51,705 (34.74%)	17,062 (11.46%)	8,320 (5.59%)	5,042 (3.39%)	3,222 (2.16%)	1,105 (0.74%)

== Subdivisions ==
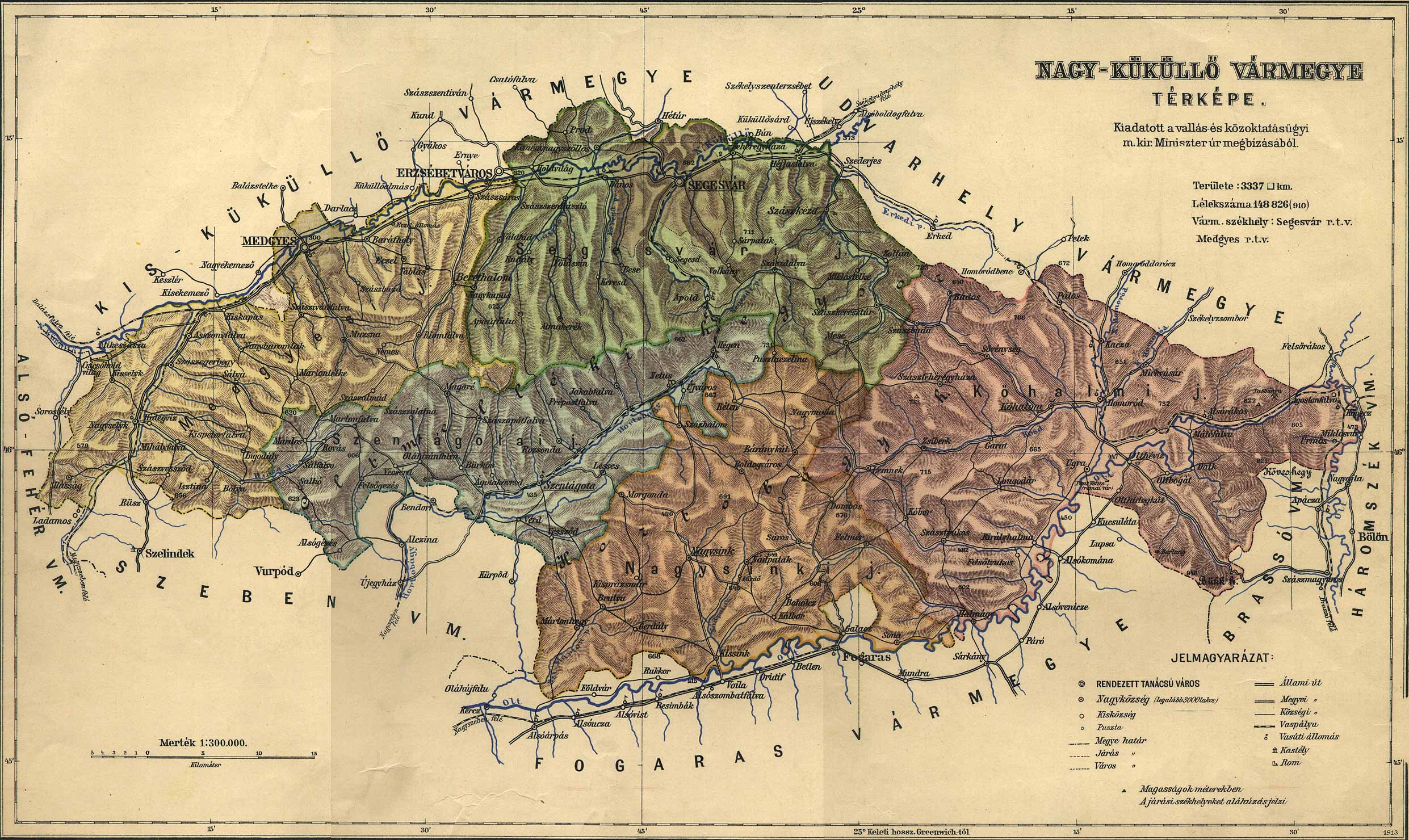

In the early 20th century, the subdivisions of Nagy-Küküllő County were:

Districts (járás)
District	Capital
Kőhalom	Kőhalom (now Rupea)
Medgyes	Medgyes (now Mediaș)
Nagysink	Nagysink (now Cincu)
Segesvár	Segesvár (now Sighișoara)
Szentágota	Szentágota (now Agnita)
Urban districts (rendezett tanácsú város)
Medgyes (now Mediaș)
Segesvár (now Sighișoara)
