= Fogaras County =

County of the Kingdom of Hungary

Fogaras County Comitatus Fogarasensis (Latin) Fogaras vármegye (Hungarian) Komitat Fogarasch (German) Comitatul Făgăraș (Romanian)
- County of the Kingdom of Hungary
- 1876–1920
- Coat of arms

- Capital: Fogaras
- Area
  - Coordinates: 45°51′N 24°58′E
  - 1910: 2,433 km^{2} (939 sq mi)
- Population
  - 1910: 95,174
- History
  - Established: 1876
  - Treaty of Trianon: 4 June 1920
- Today part of: Romania
- Făgăraș is the current name of the capital.

Fogaras was an administrative county (comitatus) of the Kingdom of Hungary. Its territory is now in central Romania (south-eastern Transylvania). The county's capital was Fogaras (present-day Făgăraș).

== Geography ==
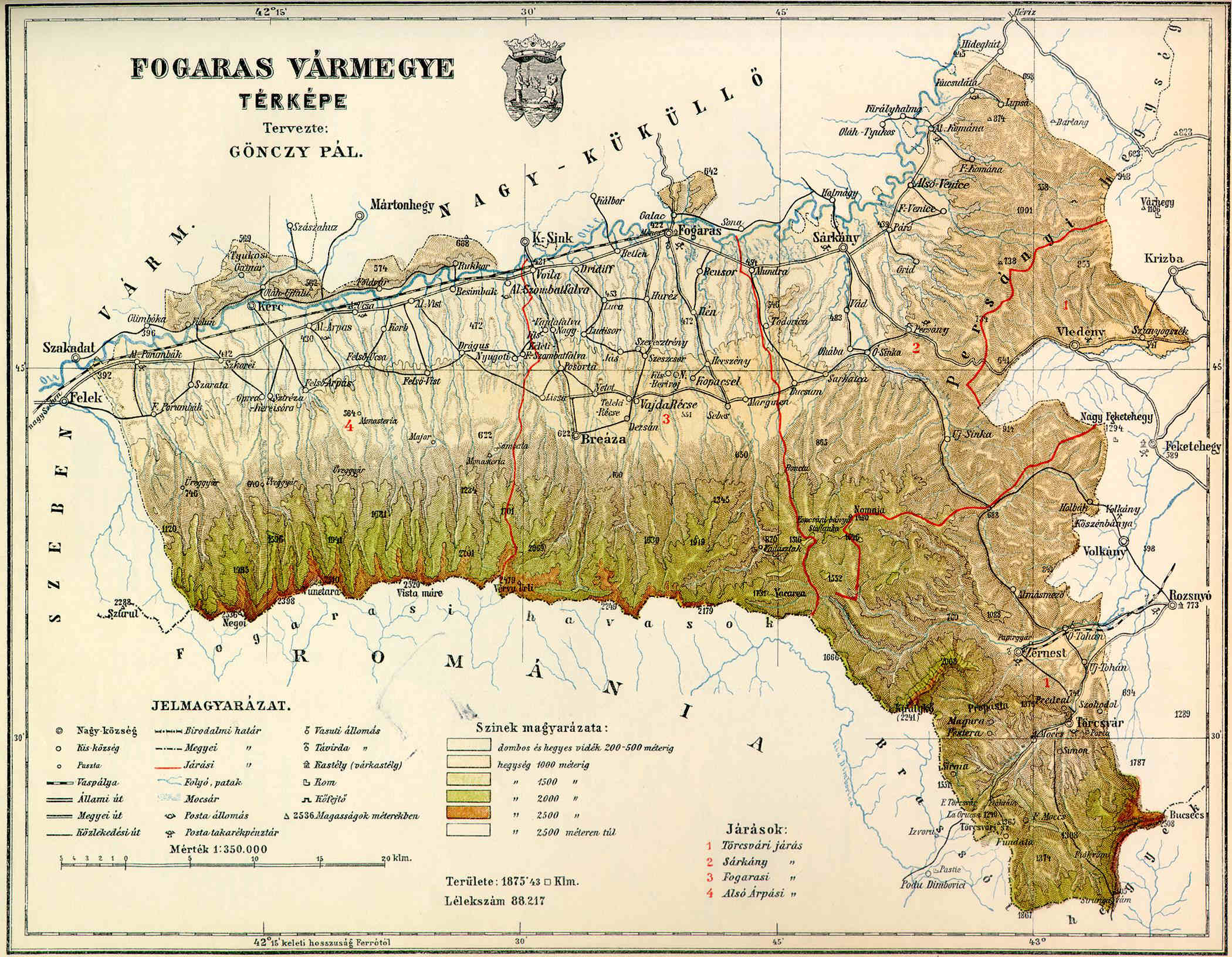
Map of Fogaras, 1891.

Fogaras county shared borders with Romania and the Hungarian counties Szeben, Nagy-Küküllő and Brassó. The river Olt formed most of its northern border. The ridge of the southern Carpathian Mountains forms its southern border. Its area was 2,433 km^{2} (939 sq mi) around 1910.

== History ==
The Fogaras region was an administrative territorial entity of the Kingdom of Hungary since the 15th century. Fogaras county was formed in 1876, when the administrative structure of Transylvania was changed. In 1920, by the Treaty of Trianon the county became part of Romania; Făgăraș County was created, with an identical territory. The territory lies in the present Romanian counties Brașov and Sibiu (the westernmost part).

== Demographics ==
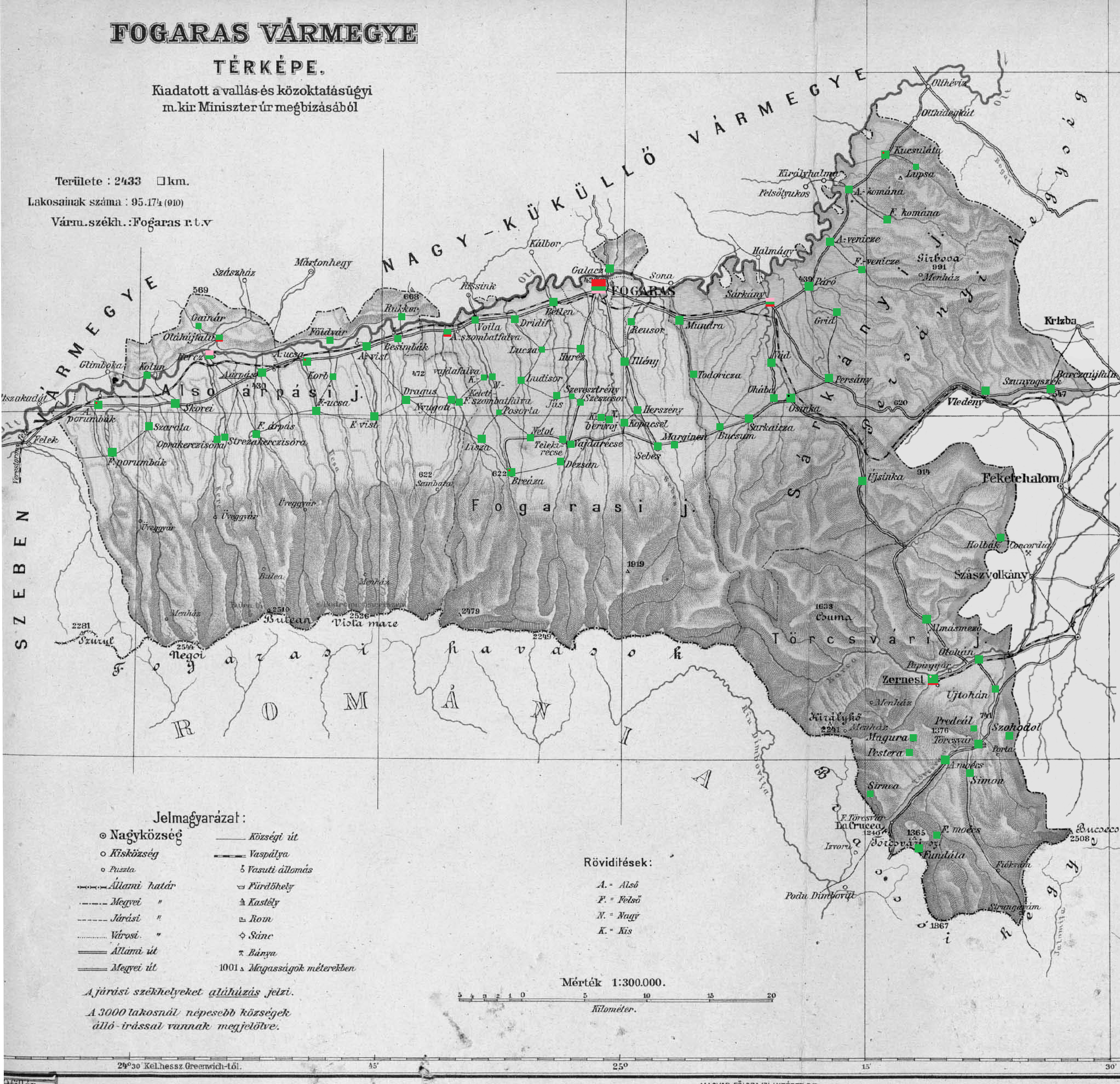
Ethnic map of the county with data of the 1910 census (see the key in the description)

Population by mother tongue (Note: Only linguistic communities > 1% are displayed.)
Census	Total	Romanian	Hungarian	German	Other or unknown
1880	84,571	75,050 (90.92%)	2,694 (3.26%)	3,850 (4.66%)	948 (1.15%)
1890	88,217	78,725 (89.24%)	4,082 (4.63%)	4,009 (4.54%)	1,401 (1.59%)
1900	92,801	83,445 (89.92%)	5,159 (5.56%)	3,627 (3.91%)	570 (0.61%)
1910	95,174	84,436 (88.72%)	6,466 (6.79%)	3,236 (3.40%)	1,036 (1.09%)

Population by religion (Note: Only religious communities > 1% are displayed.)
Census	Total	Eastern Orthodox	Greek Catholic	Roman Catholic	Lutheran	Calvinist	Jewish	Other or unknown
1880	84,571	54,900 (64.92%)	22,787 (26.94%)	2,194 (2.59%)	2,449 (2.90%)	1,335 (1.58%)	675 (0.80%)	231 (0.27%)
1890	88,217	56,943 (64.55%)	23,142 (26.23%)	2,466 (2.80%)	2,625 (2.98%)	1,801 (2.04%)	866 (0.98%)	374 (0.42%)
1900	92,801	60,220 (64.89%)	23,850 (25.70%)	2,454 (2.64%)	2,737 (2.95%)	2,225 (2.40%)	873 (0.94%)	442 (0.48%)
1910	95,174	61,881 (65.02%)	23,651 (24.85%)	3,024 (3.18%)	2,768 (2.91%)	2,441 (2.56%)	905 (0.95%)	504 (0.53%)

== Subdivisions ==
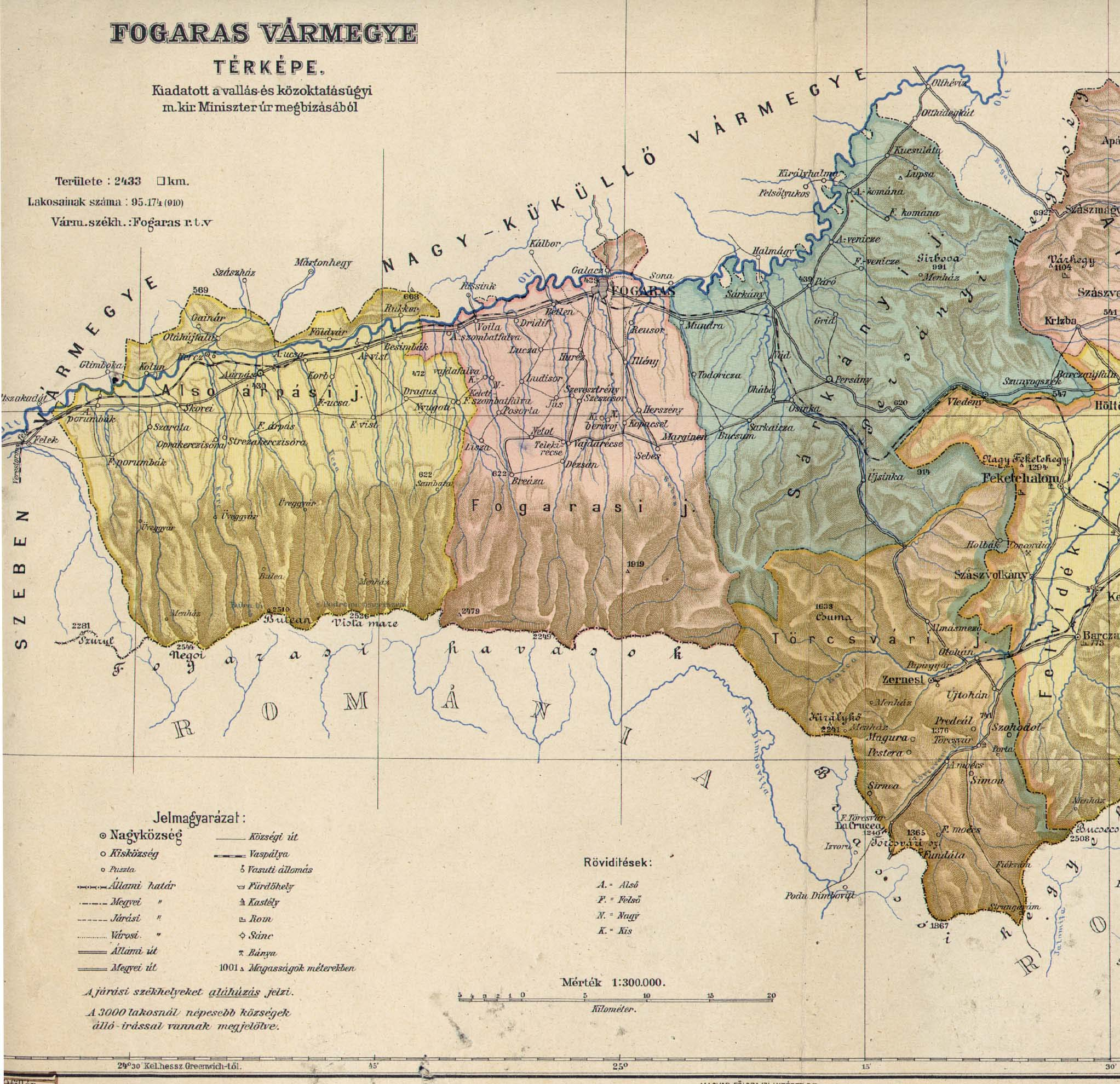

In the early 20th century, the subdivisions of Fogaras county were:

Districts (járás)
District	Capital
Alsóárpás	Alsóárpás (now Arpașu de Jos)
Fogaras	Fogaras (now Făgăraș)
Sárkány	Sárkány (now Șercaia)
Törcsvár	Zernest (now Zărnești)
Urban districts (rendezett tanácsú város)
Fogaras (now Făgăraș)
