= Valea Mare =

Valea Mare may refer to the following places:

== Populated places in Romania ==
- Valea Mare, Covasna, a commune in Covasna County
- Valea Mare, Dâmbovița, a commune in Dâmbovița County
- Valea Mare, Olt, a commune in Olt County
- Valea Mare, Vâlcea, a commune in Vâlcea County
- Valea Mare-Pravăț, a commune in Argeș County
- Valea Mare, a village in Ceru-Băcăinți Commune, Alba County
- Valea Mare, a village in Gurahonț Commune, Arad County
- Valea Mare, a village in Săvârșin Commune, Arad County
- Valea Mare, a village in Priboieni Commune, Argeș County
- Valea Mare, a village in Colonești, Bacău County
- Valea Mare, a village in Faraoani Commune, Bacău County
- Valea Mare, a village in Roșiori, Bacău County
- Valea Mare, a village in Șanț Commune, Bistrița-Năsăud County
- Valea Mare, a village in Urmeniș Commune, Bistrița-Năsăud County
- Valea Mare, a village in Fârliug Commune, Caraș-Severin County
- Valea Mare, a village in Cândești, Dâmbovița County
- Valea Mare, a village in Valea Lungă, Dâmbovița County
- Valea Mare, a village in Melinești Commune, Dolj County
- Valea Mare, a village in Runcu, Gorj County
- Valea Mare, a village in Band, Mureș County
- Valea Mare, a village in Războieni, Neamț County
- Valea Mare, a village in Dumești, Vaslui, Vaslui County
- Valea Mare, a village in Ivănești Commune, Vaslui County
- Valea Mare, a district in the town of Negrești, Vaslui County
- Valea Mare, a district in the town of Băbeni, Vâlcea County
- Valea Mare, a district in the town of Berbești, Vâlcea County
- Valea Mare de Codru, a village in Holod Commune, Bihor County
- Valea Mare de Criș (disambiguation)

== Rivers in Romania ==
- Valea Mare, a tributary of the Aita in Covasna County
- Valea Mare (Almaș), a tributary of the Almaș in Hunedoara County
- Valea Mare (Arieș), a tributary of the Arieș in Alba County
- Valea Mare, a tributary of the Bahlui in Iași County
- Valea Mare (Barcău), a tributary of the Barcău River in Sălaj County
- Valea Mare, a tributary of the Bărzăuța in Covasna County
- Valea Mare, a tributary of the Bega Poienilor in Timiș County
- Valea Mare, a tributary of the Bistra Mărului in Caraș-Severin County
- Valea Mare, a tributary of the Boșneag in Caraș-Severin County
- Valea Mare, a tributary of the Brad in Maramureș County
- Valea Mare, a tributary of the Bratia in Argeș County
- Valea Mare Cărpinoasa, a tributary of the Crișul Pietros in Bihor County
- Valea Mare, a tributary of the Căpuș in Cluj County
- Valea Mare, a tributary of the Cerna in Caraș-Severin County
- Valea Mare, a tributary of the Cibin in Sibiu County
- Valea Mare (Cigher), a tributary of the Cigher in Arad County
- Valea Mare, a tributary of the Cioiana in Gorj County
- Valea Mare (Covasna), a tributary of the Covasna in Covasna County
- Valea Mare, a tributary of the Crișul Alb in Arad County
- Valea Mare (Crișul Negru), a tributary of the Crișul Negru near Cusuiuș in Bihor County
- Valea Mare (Șuncuiș), a tributary of the Crișul Negru near Șuncuiș in Bihor County
- Valea Mare (Danube), a tributary of the Danube in Constanța County
- Valea Mare, a tributary of the Gârliște in Caraș-Severin County
- Valea Mare, a tributary of the Hodiș in Arad County
- Valea Mare, a tributary of the Iaz in Gorj County
- Valea Mare, a tributary of the Mara in Maramureș County
- Valea Mare, a tributary of the Moara in Bacău County
- Valea Mare, a tributary of the Motru in Gorj County
- Valea Mare (Mureș), a tributary of the Mureș in Hunedoara County
- Valea Mare (Nadăș), a tributary of the Nadăș in Cluj County
- Valea Mare (Netezi), a tributary of the Netezi in Neamț County
- Valea Mare (Olt), a tributary of the Olt in Brașov County
- Valea Mare, a tributary of the Olt near Sâncrăieni, Harghita County
- Valea Mare (Râul Doamnei), a tributary of the Râul Doamnei in Argeș County
- Valea Mare, another name for the river Mărtineni in Covasna County
- Valea Mare, a tributary of the Sâmbotin in Gorj County
- Valea Mare, a tributary of the Sebeș in Alba County
- Valea Mare, a tributary of the Sirețel in Iași County
- Valea Mare (Someșul Mare), a tributary of the Someșul Mare in Bistrița-Năsăud County
- Valea Mare, a tributary of the Strei in Hunedoara County
- Valea Mare, a tributary of the Șușița in Gorj County
- Valea Mare, a tributary of the Târnava Mare in Sibiu County
- Valea Mare, a tributary of the Târnava Mică in Alba County
- Valea Mare, a tributary of the Teleajen in Prahova County
- Valea Mare (Timiș), a tributary of the Timiș near Poiana, Caraș-Severin County
- Valea Mare, a smaller tributary of the Timiș near Caransebeș, Caraș-Severin County
- Valea Mare, a tributary of the Topa in Bihor County

== Populated places in Moldova ==
- Valea Mare, Ungheni, a commune in Ungheni district

== See also ==
- Valea (disambiguation)
