= First Battle of the Jiu Valley =

- Part of the Battle of the Southern Carpathians of the Romanian Campaign of World War I
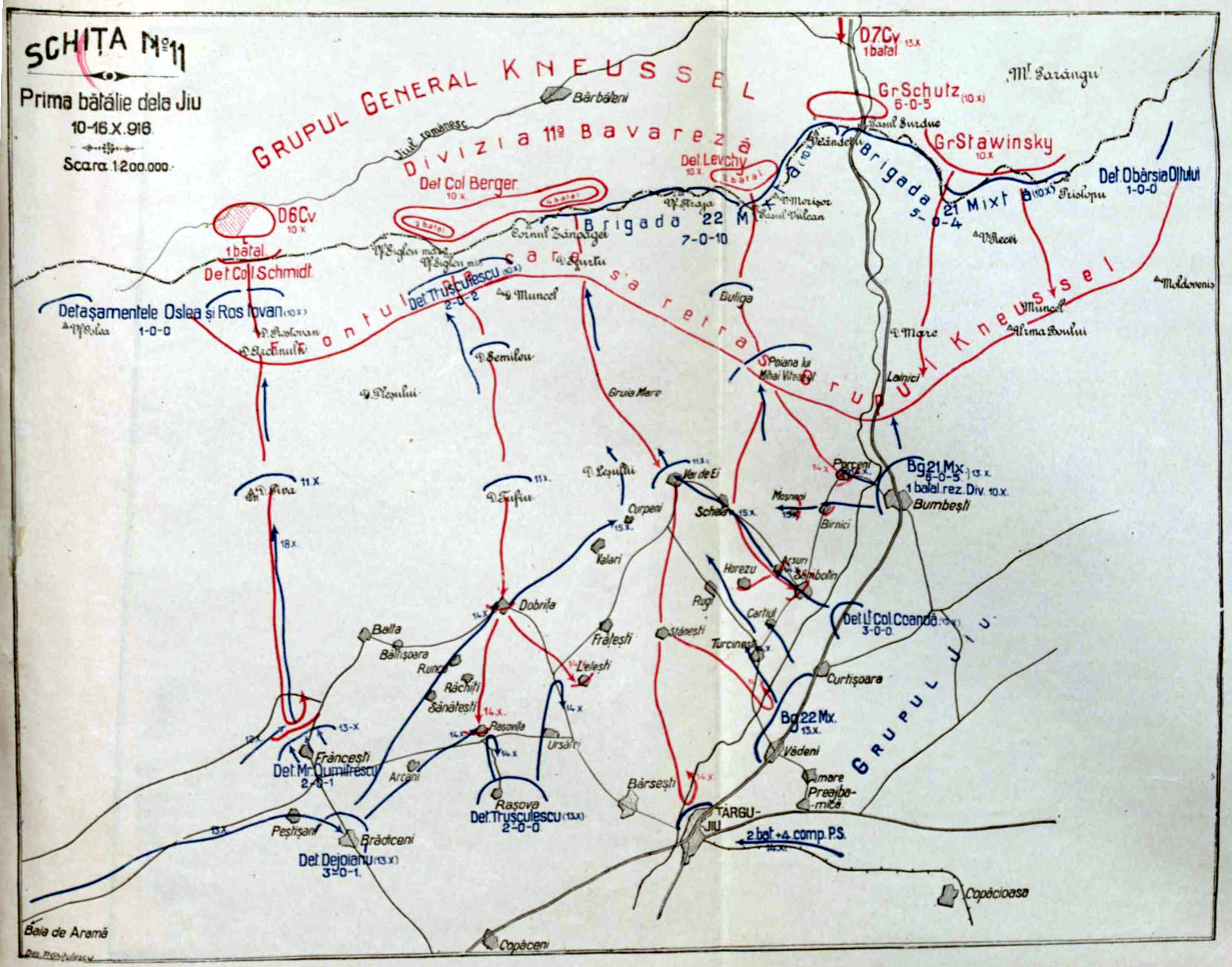
| Date | 23 October – 1 November 1916 |
| Location | Jiu Valley, Romania |
| Result | Romanian victory |

Belligerents
| Romania | German Empire; Austria-Hungary |

Commanders and leaders
| (Kingdom of Romania) Ion Dragalina (DOW) (Kingdom of Romania) Nicolae Petala (Kingdom of Romania) Ioan Culcer | (German Empire) Paul von Kneußl |

Units involved
| 1st Army: 1st Infantry Division (reinforced during the battle) | Cavalry Corps Schmettow; 11th Bavarian Infantry Division; 144th Austro-Hungarian Infantry Brigade; Württemberg Mountain Battalion |

Casualties and losses
| Unknown total 9 guns captured on 24 October but recovered on the 28th | 3,210 combat casualties: 1,500+ killed; 1,600+ captured; 90% of Erwin Rommel's company sick 8 guns and two howitzer batteries captured 14 machine guns captured |

The First Battle of the Jiu Valley was a military engagement during World War I fought between Romanian forces on one side and Central Powers forces (Germany and Austria-Hungary) on the other. The German offensive, although initially successful, was checked within days and subsequently repulsed by a Romanian counterattack. This was the most conspicuous Romanian victory during the 1916 campaign, given that it was achieved against forces which were superior in artillery and - initially - in numbers as well.

== Background ==
Romania joined the First World War on 27 August 1916, after signing the 1916 Treaty of Bucharest. After a failed Romanian offensive into Transylvania, the Central Powers began attempting to force the mountain passes in the Carpathians. With no prospect of success in the passes around Brassó (Brașov), Erich von Falkenhayn was able to dispatch General Eberhard Graf von Schmettow with his Cavalry Corps, the 11th Bavarian Infantry Division, an Austro-Hungarian brigade and the Württemberg Mountain Battalion to the Jiu Valley. Overall command of this group was under General Paul von Kneußl. Opposed to this German-led and mostly-German force was the Romanian 1st Infantry Division of the 1st Romanian Army, the main Romanian formation in the Jiu Valley.

== Battle ==
Kneußl launched his offensive in the early hours of 23 October 1916, before all his troops had assembled. He rapidly overcame the first line of resistance. Aiding the German troops was the 144th Austrian Infantry Brigade, under Colonel Stavinsky. The Romanian forces in the area were elements of the First Army, initially commanded by General Ioan Culcer. However, Culcer's suggestions of retreat led to his replacement by General Ion Dragalina on 24 October. Dragalina was wounded the next day during a reconnaissance mission, being succeeded by General Nicolae Petala, leader of the 1st Army Corps. On 25 October, the Germans and Austrians reached Dobrița and Stănești. General Dragalina, in his one day of command, successfully shifted several battalions to the region. This gave the Romanian 1st Army a local superiority against the Central Powers, and General Petala planned to strike. The Germans reached the outskirts of Frâncești on the 26th, but during that night the weather took a turn for the worse. On 27 October, Schmettow's cavalry was ordered forward to exploit what appeared to be an imminent breakthrough into Wallachia, but Kneußl's leading elements had overreached themselves. With little overall supervision, the local Romanian commanders launched a series of energetic counterattacks, which first halted the Germans and then drove them back in increasing disarray. At 10 a.m. on the 27th, the Romanians counterattacked from south and east, along a front stretching from Sâmbotin to Birnici (now Mierea). Further Romanian attacks took place at noon, between Dobrița and Stănești. The extra incentive of 1,000 lei offered by Petala to anyone who captured an enemy artillery piece proved effective. Romanian troops made several breakthroughs into the German lines, capturing two guns and pushing the infantry back into the mountains. With German supply lines severed by accidents and bad weather, a general retreat commenced on 28 October. Falkenhayn's staff recognized that the Romanian counterattack marked the end of von Kneußl's operation. Although the mountain passes remained in his possession, a decisive breakthrough had eluded Kneußl.

On 27 October, the Romanians counterattacked at the village of Arsuri, where they captured two 4-inch howitzer batteries which were subsequently used against the Germans, rendering excellent service. At Turcinești, fighting raged between 7 am and 5 pm. The Romanians threw back the Germans and inflicted considerable losses. At Rasovița, the battle remained undecided until 1:30 pm. Romanian reinforcements joined the battle and by 2 pm the Germans had been defeated, losing 400 prisoners and 12 machine guns. On the extreme left flank, the Romanians could make no gains, being only able to contain the Germans. On the next day - 28 October - the Romanian advance continued along the entire front. At the hill south of Horezu, the most violent fighting of the day took place, the Romanians driving back the Bavarians and capturing 2 machine guns and 17 guns, 9 of which were Romanian guns captured by the Germans on 24 October. The Romanian offensive continued on 29 October and lasted until 1 November.

Among the German officers involved in the battle was Erwin Rommel, at that time serving as an Oberleutnant in command of a company within the Württemberg Mountain Battalion. Rommel and his soldiers advanced with no pack animals or winter clothing. Rommel's forces soon met a few men with an officer who had been in combat on the other side of the mountain in a Bavarian formation. The Bavarians told Rommel that most of their comrades were overwhelmed in close-quarter combat by the Romanians. Survivors described the Romanians as "very wild and dangerous opponents". Rommel and his troops faced rain and freezing weather during their first night in the mountains, but were forbidden to fall back to a sheltered position. The second night in the mountains had drained Rommel's men of their last strength, but despite numerous cases of fever, the sector commander continued to refuse a withdrawal. At daybreak, the doctor had to send 40 men to the field hospital. After Rommel himself visited the sector commander and personally described the situation, he was finally allowed to withdraw. By then, 90% of his men were under medical care due to cold and illness.

=== Battle of Târgu Jiu ===
On 27 October (Old style: 14 October), German units reached the outskirts of Târgu Jiu and attempted to cross the bridge into the town. They were repulsed by troops aided by the local population, and during this engagement the would-be Second Lieutenant Ecaterina Teodoroiu would make her first contribution to the Romanian Campaign. On 27 October, a German unit had succeeded in breaking through the center of the Romanian lines and reached the bridge which approached Târgu Jiu from the west. A battalion of militia from Gorj was taken by surprise, but - supported by a scratch force from Târgu Jiu itself - managed to hold out until 4:30 pm, when Romanian reinforcements enabled the defenders to prevail. The Germans had to retire, leaving prisoners in the hands of the Romanians. The Germans had been ordered to take Târgu Jiu at 2 pm on the 27th.

== Aftermath ==
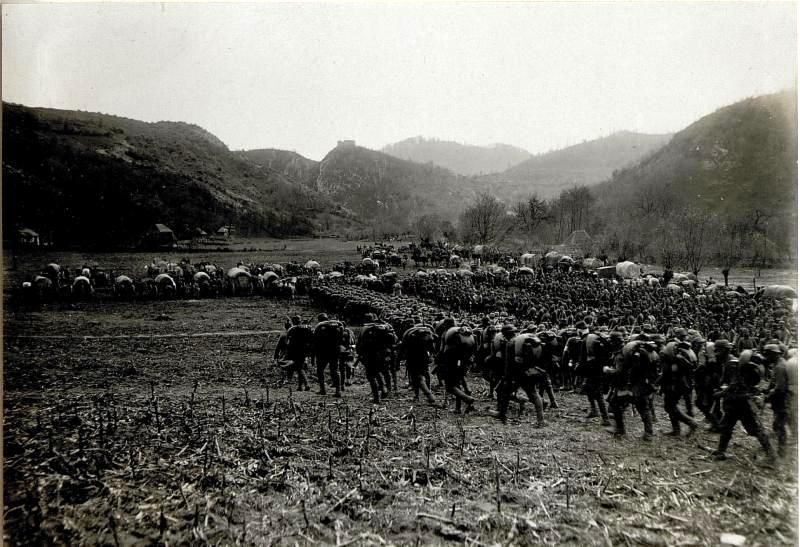
German troops advancing towards Petrozsény on 5 November 1916

During the initial stages of the German advance (23-26 October), the Central Powers occupied a front along the Northern outskirts of Frâncești, Turcinești, Sâmbotin and Bumbești. In the aftermath of the Romanian counterattack (27-28 October), the Romanians re-occupied the villages of Stănești, Rugi, Vălari, Schela and Birnici and retook the hills of Leșului and Seniuleului as well as the Gruba Mare massif. Almost the entire Western half of the salient created by the offensive of the Central Powers was pushed back towards the Romanian border, save for Arcanului Hill. On the Eastern half of the salient, the Central Powers managed to hold on to the mountain passes (Surduc and Vulcan), Mare Hill and the settlements of Lainici and Buliga, this sector of the front running just north of Muncelu and Moldavisu. Overall, about half of the gains made by the Central Powers were rolled back by the Romanians.

Total Central Powers casualties amounted to 3,210 killed, wounded and missing (including 53 officers). On 27 October alone, the Romanians captured 450 prisoners. The casualties were entirely of two categories: killed or captured. The total number of Central Powers dead buried by the Romanians exceeded 1,500, while the number of prisoners likewise exceeded 1,600. Material losses amounted to two howitzer batteries, 8 other guns and 14 machine guns. By 8 November, hundreds of crosses marked the graves of the fallen Bavarians.

Falkenhayn planned a new offensive in the region on 5 November, but the "significant setback" inflicted by the Romanians forced him to postpone the starting date of the renewed assault until 11 November. August von Mackensen's crossing of the Danube was also delayed by over two weeks. He intended to cross the river on 7 November. Mackensen crossed the Danube on 23 November.

Although he was in command for only one day, it is General Ioan Dragalina who is credited with this Romanian success, the most conspicuous Romanian victory of the 1916 campaign, given that it was achieved against forces superior in both numbers and artillery. Dragalina had inferior numbers and no reserves, but addressed the issue of his numerically inferior forces by borrowing detachments from two nearby groups. Although he was wounded in action and replaced as commander of the 1st Army on 25 October, his dispositions - made with great tactical skill - ensured the success of the Romanian counterattack which began on 27 October, and lasted as late as 1 November. Dragalina died of his wounds on 9 November.
