= Cornul =

Cornul Urmuroasa, Cernădia
- Location within Romania

Location
- Country: Romania
- Counties: Gorj County
- Villages: Obreja, Măzăroi, Călești, Bălani

Physical characteristics
- Mouth: Șușița
  - coordinates: 45.0533°N 23.2412°E
- Length: 16 km (9.9 mi)
- Basin size: 21 km^{2} (8.1 sq mi)

Basin features
- Progression: Șușița→ Jiu→ Danube→ Black Sea
- River code: VII.1.25b.3

The Cornul (also: Urmuroasa, Cernădia) is a left tributary of the river Șușița in Romania. It flows into the Șușița in Bârsești. Its length is 16 km (9.9 mi) and its basin size is 21 km^{2} (8.1 sq mi).
