= Grivele =

Grivele may refer to the following rivers in Romania:

- Grivele, a tributary of the Șușița in Gorj County
- Grivele, a tributary of the Surpata in Hunedoara County
