= Scărișoara River =

Scărișoara River may refer to the following rivers in Romania:

- Scărișoara, a tributary of the Măcriș in Gorj County
- Scărișoara, a tributary of the Motru in Gorj County
- Scărișoara, a tributary of the Piva in Gorj County
- Scărișoara, a tributary of the Suseni in Gorj County
- Scărișoara, a tributary of the Valea Neagră in Satu Mare County
