= Dumitra Hydro Power Plant =

- Country: Romania
- Location: Bumbești-Jiu, Gorj County
- Coordinates: 45°17′55″N 23°22′44″E
- Purpose: Power
- Status: Stalled
- Construction began: July 2004

Dam and spillways
- Impounds: Jiu River

Power Station
- Type: Run-of-the-river
- Turbines: 3 x vertical Francis
- Installed capacity: 24.5 MW

Dumitra Hydro Power Plant is a run-of-the-river hydropower plant under construction on the Jiu River in Romania, with an installed capacity of 24.5 MW.

It is part of a broader project of hydropower development in the Bumbești–Livezeni stretch of the Jiu River, that includes three hydropower plants with an overall capacity 80 MW. With a total cost of $280 million, it is the largest investment in hydropower since 1990 in Romania.

The project was started in the 1990s and it is made up by the construction of an arched concrete dam which was equipped with three vertical turbines. The power plant will generate 215 GWh of electricity per year.

As of 2019, the project was 98% complete, but blocked by a justice decision that cancelled the construction permit in late 2017.
