= Chițiu =

- Location within Romania

Location
- Country: Romania
- Counties: Gorj County

Physical characteristics
- Source: Parâng Mountains
- Mouth: Jiu
  - coordinates: 45.2623°N 23.3931°E
- Length: 6 km (3.7 mi)
- Basin size: 11 km^{2} (4.2 sq mi)

Basin features
- Progression: Jiu→ Danube→ Black Sea
- Tributaries
  - right: Pârleele
- River code: VII.1.18

The Chițiu is a left tributary of the river Jiu in Romania. Its source is in the Parâng Mountains. It flows into the Jiu near the Lainici Monastery, in the Jiu Gorge. Its length is 6 km (3.7 mi) and its basin size is 11 km^{2} (4.2 sq mi).
