= Bălteni =

Bălteni may refer to several places in Romania:

- Bălteni, Olt, a commune in Olt County
- Bălteni, Vaslui, a commune in Vaslui County
- Bălteni, a village in Tigveni Commune, Argeș County
- Bălteni, a village in C.A. Rosetti Commune, Buzău County
- Bălteni, a village in Conţeşti Commune, Dâmboviţa County
- Bălteni, a village in Probota Commune, Iaşi County
- Bălteni, a village in Periș Commune, Ilfov County
- Bălteni, a village in Copăceni Commune, Vâlcea County
- Băltenii de Jos and Băltenii de Sus, villages in Beștepe Commune, Tulcea County

== See also ==
- Bâlteni, a commune in Gorj County
