= Vălari =

Vălari may refer to several places in Romania:

- Vălari, a village in Stăneşti Commune, Gorj County
- Vălari, a village in Topliţa Commune, Hunedoara County

== See also ==
- Valari, a type of boomerang from India
