= Moara (Siret) =

- Location within Romania

Location
- Country: Romania
- Counties: Bacău County
- Villages: Glodișoarele, Bălușa, Poiana, Negri

Physical characteristics
- Mouth: Siret
  - location: near Mâgla
  - coordinates: 46.6882°N 26.9456°E
- Length: 23 km (14 mi)
- Basin size: 131 km^{2} (51 sq mi)

Basin features
- Progression: Siret→ Danube→ Black Sea
- Tributaries
  - right: Trestia, Recea, Valea Mare
- River code: XII.1.47

The Moara (also: Mora) is a left tributary of the river Siret in Romania. It flows into the Siret near Mâgla. The basin size of the 23 km (14 mi) long Moara is 131 km^{2} (51 sq mi).
