= Romanați =

Romanați may refer to:

- Romanați County
- Romanați River
