= Tetila =

- Location within Romania

Location
- Country: Romania
- Counties: Gorj County
- Villages: Lăzărești, Tetila

Physical characteristics
- Mouth: Jiu
  - coordinates: 45.124°N 23.344°E
- Length: 11 km (6.8 mi)
- Basin size: 17 km^{2} (6.6 sq mi)

Basin features
- Progression: Jiu→ Danube→ Black Sea
- River code: VII.1.22

The Tetila is a left tributary of the river Jiu in Romania. It flows into the Jiu near the village Tetila. Its length is 11 km (6.8 mi) and its basin size is 17 km^{2} (6.6 sq mi).
