= Porcu (Jiu) =

- Location within Romania

Location
- Country: Romania
- Counties: Gorj County

Physical characteristics
- Mouth: Jiu
  - coordinates: 45.1764°N 23.3716°E
- Length: 16 km (9.9 mi)
- Basin size: 25 km^{2} (9.7 sq mi)

Basin features
- Progression: Jiu→ Danube→ Black Sea
- River code: VII.1.21

The Porcu is a right tributary of the river Jiu in Romania. It flows into the Jiu near Bumbești-Jiu. Its length is 16 km (9.9 mi) and its basin size is 25 km^{2} (9.7 sq mi).
