= Vlăduleni =

Vlăduleni may refer to several villages in Romania:

- Vlăduleni, a village in Bâlteni Commune, Gorj County
- Vlăduleni, a village in Osica de Sus Commune, Olt County
