= Șușița =

Șușița may refer to several places in Romania:

- Șușița, a village in Breznița-Ocol Commune, Mehedinți County
- Șușița, a village in Grozești Commune, Mehedinți County
- Șușița (Mehedinți), a tributary of the Jiu in Mehedinți and Gorj Counties
- Șușița (Gorj), a tributary of the Jiu in Gorj County
- Șușița (Siret), a tributary of the Siret in Vrancea County
