= Gioroc =

- Location within Romania

Location
- Country: Romania
- Counties: Dolj County
- Villages: Castranova

Physical characteristics
- Mouth: Jiu
  - coordinates: 44.1042°N 23.8789°E
- Length: 15 km (9.3 mi)
- Basin size: 55 km^{2} (21 sq mi)

Basin features
- Progression: Jiu→ Danube→ Black Sea

The Gioroc is a left tributary of the river Jiu in Romania. It flows into the Jiu near Foișor. Its length is 15 km (9.3 mi) and its basin size is 55 km^{2} (21 sq mi).
