= Susita =

Susita, Sussita, Şuşiţa may refer to:

- Sussita car models produced by former Israeli Autocars Co.
- Sussita/Hippos, ancient city on Golan Heights
- Şuşiţa (disambiguation), several places in Romania
