= Cocorăscu =

Cocorăscu is a Romanian surname derived from the name of nickname Cocor, "Crane", using the patronymic suffix -ascu. Notable people with the surname include:

- Dumitru Cocorăscu
- Traian Cocorăscu
