= Țiganu River =

Țiganu River may refer to the following rivers in Romania:

- Țiganu, a tributary of the Bâsca in Covasna County
- Țiganu, a tributary of the Ciocadia in Gorj County
- Țiganu, a tributary of the Iaz in Gorj County
- Țiganu, a tributary of the Jieț in Hunedoara County
- Valea Țiganului, a tributary of the Sădurel in Sibiu County
- Țiganu, a tributary of the Sebeș in Brașov County
- Țiganu, a tributary of the Șușița in Gorj County
