= Bratcu =

- Location within Romania

Location
- Country: Romania
- Counties: Gorj County

Physical characteristics
- Source: Vâlcan Mountains
- Mouth: Jiu
  - coordinates: 45.2176°N 23.3767°E
- Length: 11 km (6.8 mi)
- Basin size: 19 km^{2} (7.3 sq mi)

Basin features
- Progression: Jiu→ Danube→ Black Sea
- River code: VII.1.19

The Bratcu is a right tributary of the river Jiu in Romania. It flows into the Jiu north of Bumbești-Jiu. Its length is 11 km (6.8 mi) and its basin size is 19 km^{2} (7.3 sq mi).
