= Suseni =

Suseni may refer to:

== Places in Romania ==
- Suseni, Argeș
- Suseni, Harghita
- Suseni, Mureș
- Suseni, a village in Bogați Commune, Argeș County
- Suseni, a village in Runcu, Gorj
- Suseni, a village in Râu de Mori Commune, Hunedoara County
- Suseni, a village in Băcani Commune, Vaslui County
- Suseni, a village in Stoenești, Vâlcea County
- Suseni, a district in the town of Zlatna, Alba County
- Suseni, a district in the town of Bolintin-Vale, Giurgiu County
- Suseni (river), a tributary of the Șușița in Gorj County

== Other uses ==
- Suseni (Kurdish tribe), a tribe in Iran
