= Sadu (Jiu) =

- Location within Romania

Location
- Country: Romania
- Counties: Gorj County

Physical characteristics
- Source: Parâng Mountains
- Mouth: Jiu
  - location: Bumbești-Jiu
  - coordinates: 45.1835°N 23.3826°E
- Length: 22 km (14 mi)
- Basin size: 22 km^{2} (8.5 sq mi)

Basin features
- Progression: Jiu→ Danube→ Black Sea
- Tributaries
  - left: Zănoaga, Sădișor
  - right: Sadul lui Sân, Alunul

The Sadu is a left tributary of the river Jiu in Romania. It discharges into the Jiu in Bumbești-Jiu. Its length is 22 km (14 mi) and its basin size is 22 km^{2} (8.5 sq mi).
