= Odobești (disambiguation) =

Odobești may refer to several places in Romania:

- Odobești, Vrancea County
- Odobești, Bacău, a commune in Bacău County
- Odobești, Dâmbovița, a commune in Dâmbovița County

and to:

- Odobești, a village in Valea-Trestieni Commune, Nisporeni district, Moldova
