= Vulcan Pass =

Mountain pass in Hunedoara, Romania

- Location within Romania
- Elevation: 1,621 metres (5,318 ft)
- Traversed by: DN66/E79

Third Approach
- Location: Romania
- Range: Vâlcan Mountains
- Coordinates: 45°17.55′N 23°18.29′E

Vulcan Pass (Romanian: Pasul Vulcan, Hungarian: Vulkán-szoros) is a mountain pass connecting the Gorj and Hunedoara counties of Romania, on the Jiu River valley.

The pass is located in the Vâlcan Mountains, at an altitude of 1,621 m (5,318 ft), and is crossed by the national road DN66, part of European route E79. The Defileul Jiului National Park is a protected area that encompasses the Vulcan Pass. The nearby city of Vulcan is named after the pass.
