= Negri, Bacău =

Negri
- Commune
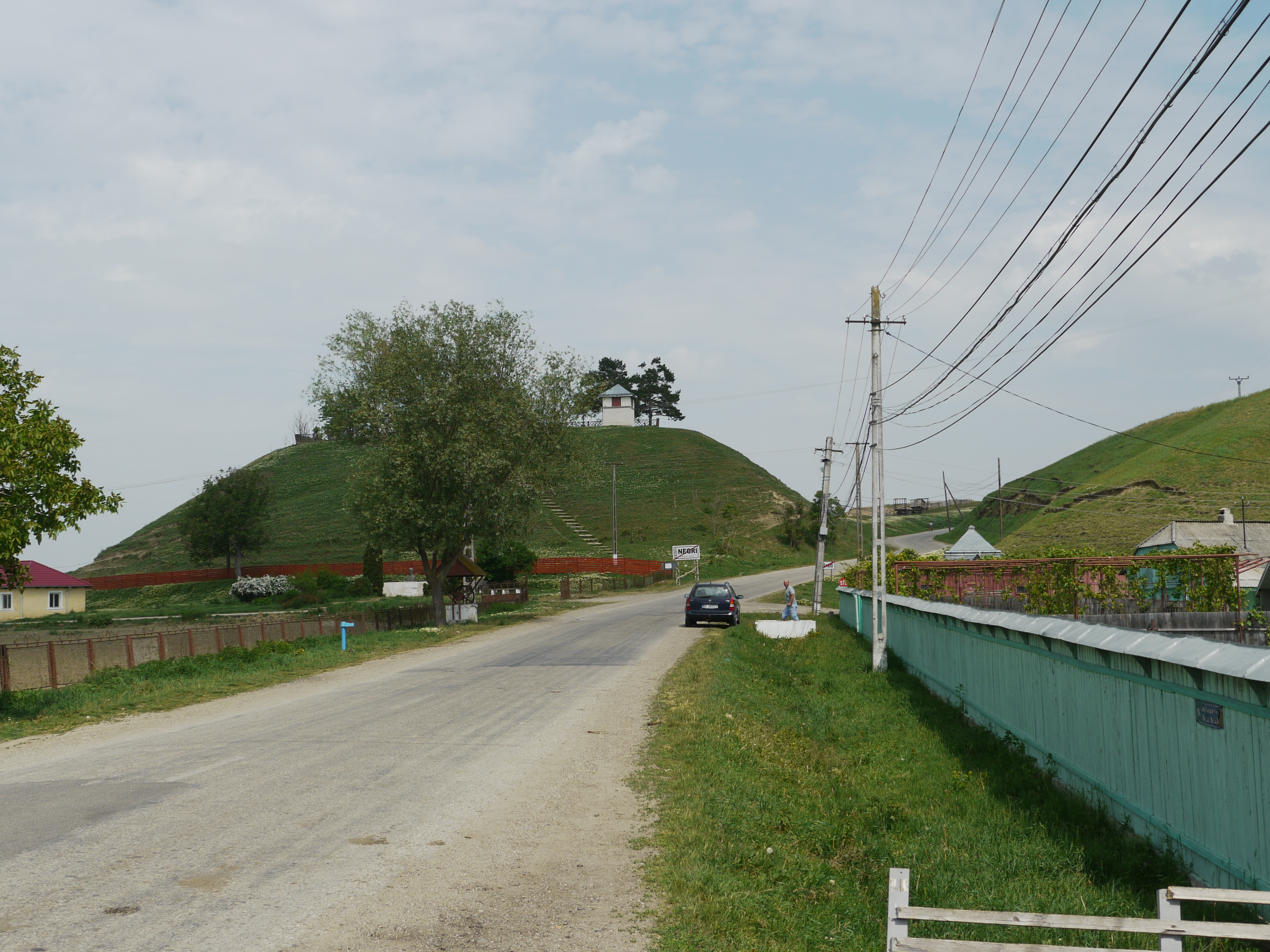
- The Zargidava acropolis in Brad

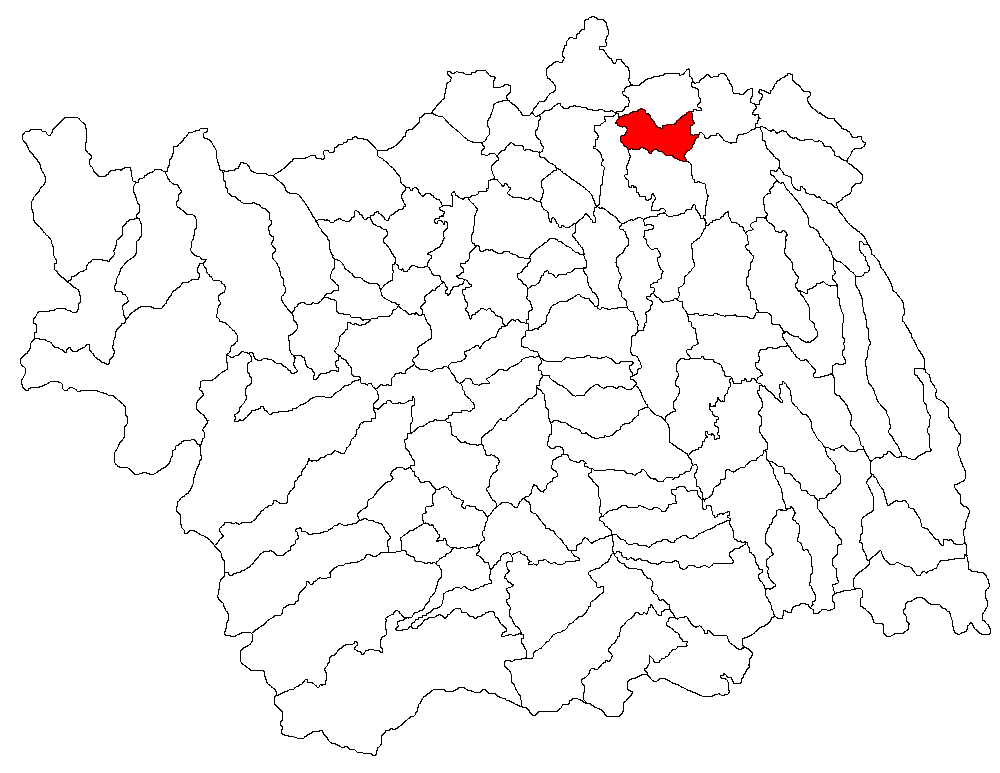
- Location in Bacău County

- Location in Romania
- Coordinates: 46°42′N 26°58′E
- Country: Romania
- County: Bacău

Government
  - Mayor (2024–2028): Ioan Iștoc (PNL)
- Area: 39 km^{2} (15 sq mi)
- Elevation: 181 m (594 ft)
- Population (2021-12-01): 2,516
  - Density: 65/km^{2} (170/sq mi)
- Time zone: UTC+02:00 (EET)
  - Summer (DST): UTC+03:00 (EEST)
- Postal code: 607345
- Area code: +(40) 234
- Vehicle reg.: BC
- Website: primarianegri.ro

Negri is a commune in Bacău County, Western Moldavia, Romania. It is composed of six villages: Brad, Călinești, Mâgla, Negri, Poiana, and Ursoaia.

The commune is located in the northeastern part of the county, on the banks of the river Moara, which flows into the Siret near Mâgla. The center of the commune is linked by county road DJ241 to Mâgla and by communal road DC20 to Poiana and Călinești.

The village of Negri is home to the ACS Negri sports club.

Historical population
Year	Pop.	±%
2002	3,066	—
2011	2,709	−11.6%
2021	2,516	−7.1%
Source: INS, Census data
