= Gheorghe Banu =

Romanian eugenicist and politician

Gheorghe Banu (23 March 1889—15 August 1957) was a Romanian hygienist and politician who served as Health Minister in the Octavian Goga government from 12 December 1937 to 10 February 1938. He was a leading promoter of eugenics among academics in the national capital Bucharest.

He was born in Secuieni, Bacău County. He studied from 1919 to 1921 at the Faculty of Sciences of the University of Paris, where he obtained in 1922 his doctorate with thesis Recherches physiologiques sur le développement neuro-musculaire chez l'homme et l'animal. From 1931 to 1944 he was the editor of the Review for Social Hygiene, which he founded.

He died in Bucharest.
