= Dorin Arcanu =

Romanian footballer

Personal information
- Date of birth: 29 March 1970 (age 56)
- Place of birth: Bumbești-Jiu, Romania
- Height: 1.89 m (6 ft 2 in)
- Position: Goalkeeper

Youth career
- 1985–1989: Metalurgistul Sadu
- 1989–1990: CSȘ Craiova

Senior career*
Years	Team	Apps	(Gls)
1990–1991	Gloria Reșița		
1991–1992	Politehnica Timișoara	3	(0)
1992–1996	FC U Craiova	67	(0)
1996–1999	Oțelul Galați	64	(0)
2000	Rocar București	6	(0)
2000–2003	Brașov	41	(0)
2003–2005	Politehnica Iași	21	(0)
2006–2008	Săcele	23	(0)
Total		225	(0)
- * Club domestic league appearances and goals as of 1 May 2019

Dorin Arcanu (born 29 March 1970) is a Romanian former professional footballer who played as a goalkeeper for teams such as FC Universitatea Craiova, Oțelul Galați, FC Brașov and Politehnica Iași, among others.

== Honours ==
FC Universitatea Craiova

- Cupa României: 1992–93; Runner-up 1993–94

Politehnica Iași

- Divizia B: 2003–04
