= Zargidava =

Dacian fortified settlement

Coordinates: 46.7253°N 26.9500°E

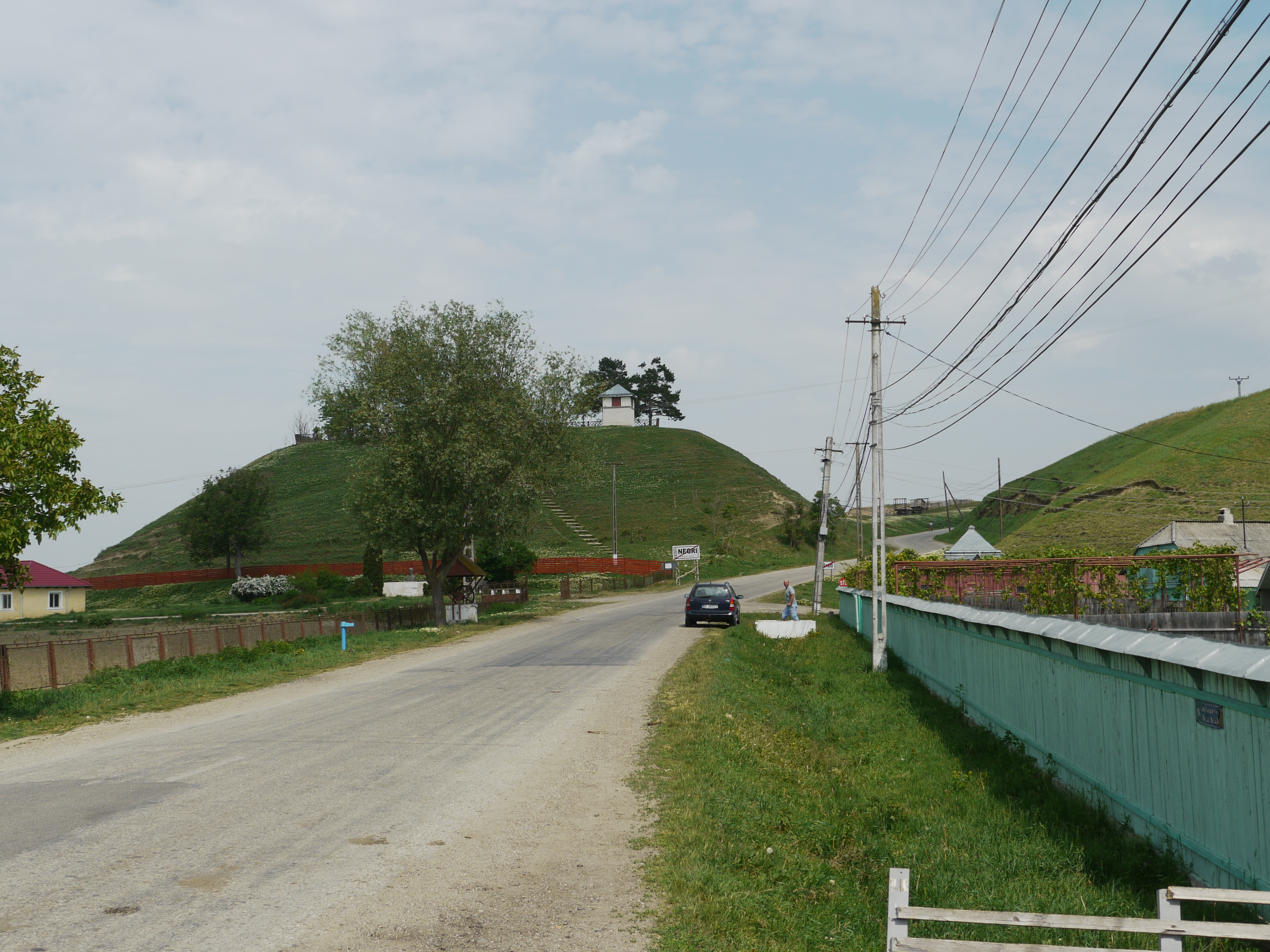
The Zargidava acropolis in Brad, Bacău County

Zargidava (Ancient Greek: Ζαργίδαυα) was a Dacian town mentioned by Ptolemy.

== See also ==
- Dacian davae
- List of ancient cities in Thrace and Dacia
- Dacia
- Roman Dacia
