= Sâmbotin =

Sâmbotin Viezuroiu
- Location within Romania

Location
- Country: Romania
- Counties: Gorj County
- Villages: Sâmbotin

Physical characteristics
- Mouth: Jiu
  - location: Sâmbotin
  - coordinates: 45.1229°N 23.3407°E
- Length: 11 km (6.8 mi)
- Basin size: 35 km^{2} (14 sq mi)

Basin features
- Progression: Jiu→ Danube→ Black Sea
- Tributaries
  - left: Vijoaia
  - right: Hărăbor, Valea Mare
- River code: VII.1.23

The Sâmbotin is a right tributary of the river Jiu in Romania. It flows into the Jiu near the village Sâmbotin. Its length is 11 km (6.8 mi) and its basin size is 35 km^{2} (14 sq mi). The upper reach of the river is known as Viezuroiu.
