= Polatiștea =

Polatiștea Obârșia Polatiștei, Căpriorul
- Location within Romania

Location
- Country: Romania
- Counties: Hunedoara County

Physical characteristics
- Source: Parâng Mountains
- Mouth: Jiu
  - coordinates: 45.3384°N 23.3771°E
- Length: 13 km (8.1 mi)
- Basin size: 48 km^{2} (19 sq mi)

Basin features
- Progression: Jiu→ Danube→ Black Sea
- Tributaries
  - left: Zlemenu, Stolojoaia
  - right: Surpata, Curteasa

The Polatiștea is a left tributary of the river Jiu in Romania. The upper reach of the river is also known as Obârșia Polatiștei or Căpriorul. It flows into the Jiu in the Jiu Gorge. Its length is 13 km (8.1 mi) and its basin size is 48 km^{2} (19 sq mi).
