= Dumitru Cocorăscu =

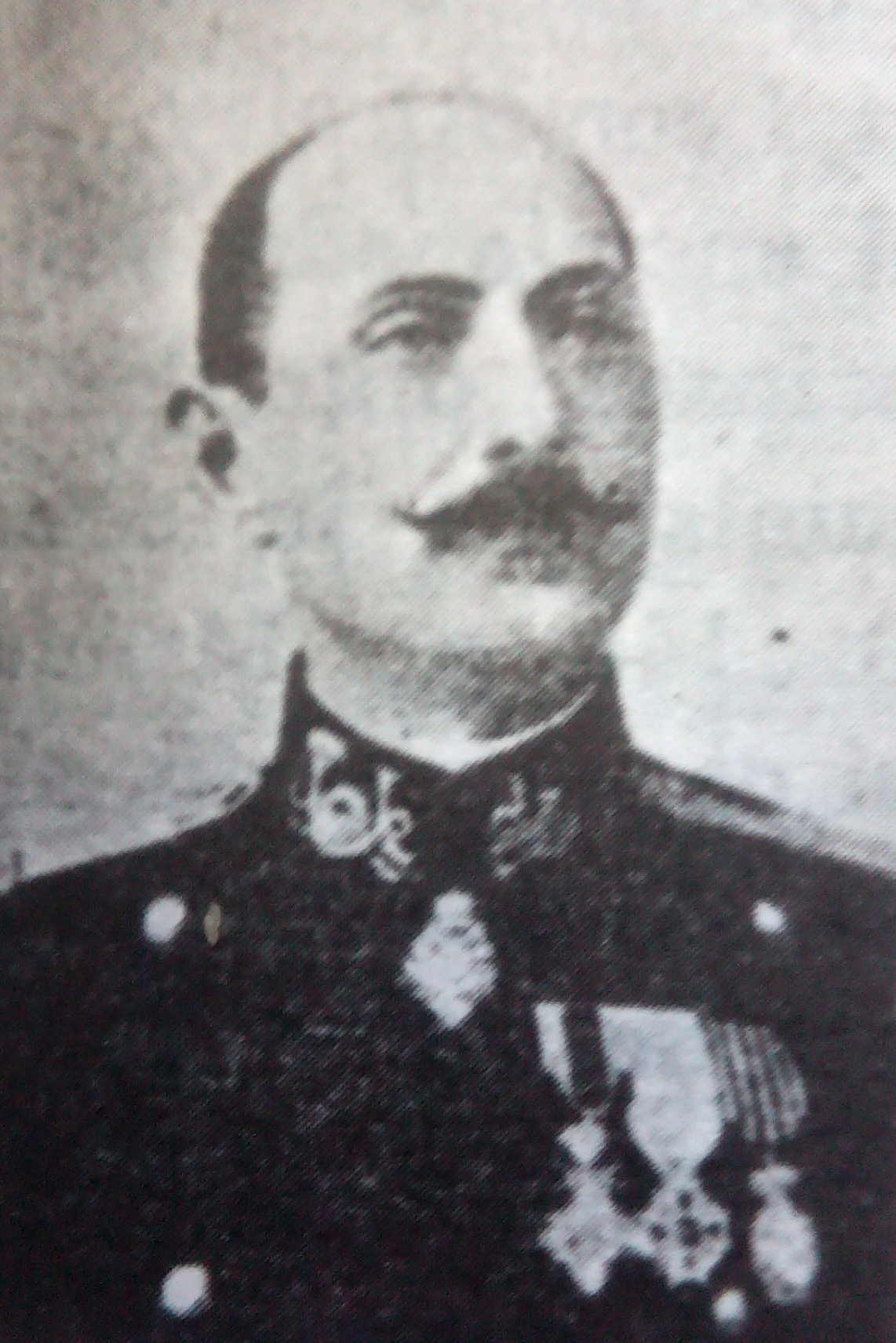
- Born: 20 February 1861
- Died: 1925 (aged 63–64)
- Military career
- Allegiance: Romania
- Branch: Romanian Land Forces
- Service years: 1881–1917
- Rank: Brigadier General
- Conflicts: Second Balkan War; World War I; Romanian campaign; Third Battle of Petroșani; First Battle of the Jiu Valley; Battle for Bucharest
- Awards: Order of the Star of Romania (1907); Order of the Crown (1897)

Dumitru I. Cocorăscu (20 February 1861 – 1925) was a Romanian general who was one of the generals of the Romanian Land Forces in World War I. He served as a brigade commander and division commander in the 1916 campaign.

== Military career ==
After graduating from the military school of officers with the rank of second lieutenant, Cocorăscu held various positions in the infantry units or in the upper echelons of the army, the most important being the commander of the 40th Infantry Regiment and head of Section 1 of the General Staff. He was promoted to the rank of colonel on 25 June 1906.

At the mobilization of the army at the beginning of World War I, Cocorăscu was recalled to active duty, fulfilling the functions of commander of the 21st Infantry Brigade from 14 to 27 August and 6 to 19 September 1916, and he was commander of the 11th Infantry Division from 6 to 19 September and 25 November to 8 December 1916. He distinguished himself during the First Battle of the Jiu Valley in 1916, after which he was promoted to the rank of brigadier general.

Following the Battle for Bucharest, he was accused of non-execution of orders. He was later acquitted of the charge, being permanently placed in reserve in January 1917.

== Works ==
- Handbook of theories containing the necessary and required knowledge of the infantry soldier by Dimitrie Cocorescu, Lieutenant in the 2nd Hunters Battalion. Bucharest (publisher: Eduard Wiegand, the successor of the Ștefan Mihălescu company), 1887
- The Military Encyclopedic Manual covers: all the knowledge necessary for the officers of: infantry, cavalry, administration and administration in different circumstances such as: general inspections; entrance exams in the School of War; deputy exams cl. II, major exams, etc., by Major Cocorescu. Part I. Text. Târgoviște (publisher: Viitorul, Elie Angelescu), 1898
- The manual of the soldier, the student of the corporal and the student of the sergeant in the infantry weapon, [by] D. I. Cocorescu, Colonel in reserve. Târgu-Jiu, publisher: N. D. Miloșescu, 1916
- Draft statutes for cattle insurance, [by] D. I. Cocorăscu. Bucharest (Tip. Universala, Iancu Ionescu), 1910
- Elementary studies on the art of war collected and laid in accordance with the prescriptions required for: major exams; the entrance exams in the high school of war and the general inspections by Major Cocorescu. [Vol. I]: Introduction to the art of war. [Vol. II]. Mobilization. [Vol. III]. Strategy. Bucharest (Tip. and Thoma Basilescu Letter Foundry), 1899
- Tactics by Major Cocorescu. Fasc. III. Bucharest (Tip. and Thoma Basilescu Letter Foundry), 1903

Translations:

- Vial, J. Art and military history course. Translated by D. Cocorescu et al, Ed. III. Vol. I-II. Bucharest, 1889–1890.

== Bibliography ==
- Constantin Kirițescu, History of the war for the unification of Romania, Scientific and Encyclopedic Publishing House, Bucharest, 1989
- Alexandru Ioanițiu (Lt.-Colonel), The Romanian War: 1916–1918, vol 1, Genius Printing House, Bucharest, 1929
  - Romania in the World War 1916–1919, Documents, Annexes, Volume 1, Official Gazette and State Printing Offices, Bucharest, 1934
  - The General Headquarters of the Romanian Army. Documents 1916–1920, Machiavelli Publishing House, Bucharest, 1996
  - Military history of the Romanian people, vol. V, Military Publishing House, Bucharest, 1989
  - Romania in the years of the First World War, Military Publishing House, Bucharest, 1987
  - Romania in the First World War, Military Publishing House, 1979
