= Șușița (Mehedinți) =

- Location within Romania

Location
- Country: Romania
- Counties: Mehedinți, Gorj
- Villages: Grozești, Ionești

Physical characteristics
- Mouth: Jiu
  - location: Ionești
  - coordinates: 44.5942°N 23.4498°E
- Length: 24 km (15 mi)
- Basin size: 55 km^{2} (21 sq mi)

Basin features
- Progression: Jiu→ Danube→ Black Sea

The Șușița is a right tributary of the river Jiu in Romania. It discharges into the Jiu in Ionești. Its length is 24 km (15 mi) and its basin size is 55 km^{2} (21 sq mi).
