= Izvor (Jiu) =

- Location within Romania

Location
- Country: Romania
- Counties: Hunedoara County

Physical characteristics
- Mouth: Jiu
  - coordinates: 45.3553°N 23.3811°E
- Length: 11 km (6.8 mi)
- Basin size: 39 km^{2} (15 sq mi)

Basin features
- Progression: Jiu→ Danube→ Black Sea
- Tributaries
  - left: Stoinicioara
  - right: Lăpușel, Largu, Sasu

The Izvor is a left tributary of the river Jiu in Romania. It flows into the Jiu south of the city Petroșani. Its length is 11 km (6.8 mi) and its basin size is 39 km^{2} (15 sq mi).
