= Dâmbova =

- Location within Romania

Location
- Country: Romania
- Counties: Gorj County
- Villages: Tâlvești, Dâmbova

Physical characteristics
- Mouth: Jiu
  - coordinates: 44.9136°N 23.1378°E
- Length: 11 km (6.8 mi)
- Basin size: 32 km^{2} (12 sq mi)

Basin features
- Progression: Jiu→ Danube→ Black Sea
- River code: VII.1.31a

The Dâmbova is a left tributary of the river Jiu in Romania. It flows into the Jiu near Rovinari. Its length is 11 km (6.8 mi) and its basin size is 32 km^{2} (12 sq mi).
