= Ionel Gane =

Romanian footballer (born 1971)

Personal information
- Full name: Ionel Tersinio Gane
- Date of birth: 12 October 1971 (age 55)
- Place of birth: Drănic, Romania
- Height: 1.82 m (6 ft 0 in)
- Position: Forward

Team information
- Current team: Romania (assistant)

Youth career
- –1989: Universitatea Craiova

Senior career*
Years	Team	Apps	(Gls)
1988–1996	Universitatea Craiova	118	(32)
1990–1992	→ Electroputere Craiova (loan)	30	(9)
1996–1998	Osasuna	33	(4)
1998–1999	Dinamo București	15	(7)
1999–2003	FC St. Gallen	117	(52)
2003–2004	Grasshopper Zürich	31	(16)
2004	Universitatea Craiova	5	(0)
2004	Tianjin Teda	13	(6)
2005	Rapid București	8	(1)
2005	VfL Bochum	1	(0)
2006	Universitatea Craiova	13	(5)
2006–2007	Argeș Pitești	7	(0)
Total		392	(132)

International career
1990–1992	Romania U21	13	(5)
1992–2001	Romania	6	(0)

Managerial career
- 2009: FC Universitatea Craiova
- 2009: FC Brașov (assistant)
- 2009–2011: Gaz Metan CFR Craiova
- 2012–2013: CS Turnu Severin (assistant)
- 2013: CS Turnu Severin
- 2013–2014: Corona Brașov
- 2014: CS Universitatea Craiova
- 2016: Petrolul Ploiești
- 2016: CSM Râmnicu Vâlcea
- 2017: Dinamo București (assistant)
- 2017–2019: Romania (assistant)
- 2020: Dinamo București (assistant)
- 2020–2021: Dinamo București
- 2022–: Romania (assistant)
- 2026: Romania (caretaker)
- * Club domestic league appearances and goals

Ionel Tersinio Gane (born 12 October 1971) is a Romanian football coach and former player who is an assistant coach for the Romania national team.

== Playing career ==
Born in Drănic, Gane played professionally in Romania for Universitatea Craiova, Electroputere Craiova, Dinamo București, Rapid București, and Argeş Piteşti; in Spain for CA Osasuna; in Switzerland for FC St. Gallen and Grasshopper Zürich; in China for Tianjin Kangshifu; and in Germany for VfL Bochum.

He also represented Romania at international level.

== Coaching career ==
In July 2009, he started working as assistant coach for FC Brașov. He was also an interim coach for FC Universitatea Craiova, during which time the club played a match against FC Dinamo Bucharest.

In September 2013, he became head coach of newly promoted in Liga I Corona Brașov.

He became manager of Petrolul Ploiești in March 2016, and CSM Râmnicu Vâlcea in June 2016, leaving that position in December 2016.

In February 2017, he was appointed assistant coach of Dinamo București under Cosmin Contra. In September 2017 he took up a similar role with the Romania national team.

In August 2020, he returned to Dinamo, again as assistant coach under Contra. In December 2020 he became head coach after Contra's departure from the club. He resigned on 15 March 2021, after a series of seven games without a win in Liga I.

In March 2026 he was temporary coach of the Romanian national team, following illness to Mircea Lucescu.

== Personal life ==
Gane's middle name is 'Tersinio' because his father was a fan of Brazil's 1970 World Cup-winning team and his favourite player from that team was Jairzinho, but he wrote the name by the way he used to pronounce it: Jersinio, that is why Ionel's nickname is Jerry. Later, when Ionel was 14 years old and had to get an identity card, the people who made the card misspelled the name putting the letter "t" instead of "j", thus resulting Tersinio.

== Playing statistics ==
Appearances and goals by national team and year
National team	Year	Apps	Goals
Romania	1992	2	0
Romania	1993	3	0
Romania	2001	1	0
Total		6	0

== Honours ==
Electroputere Craiova

- Divizia B: 1990–91

Universitatea Craiova

- Cupa României: 1992–93
- Divizia B: 2005–06

St. Gallen

- Nationalliga A: 1999–2000
