= Suseni (river) =

- Location within Romania

Location
- Country: Romania
- Counties: Gorj
- Villages: Suseni, Frătești, Ursați

Physical characteristics
- Mouth: Șușița
  - coordinates: 45.0870°N 23.2247°E
- Length: 24 km (15 mi)
- Basin size: 68 km^{2} (26 sq mi)

Basin features
- Progression: Șușița→ Jiu→ Danube→ Black Sea

The Suseni (in its upper course also: Surlău) is a right tributary of the river Șușița in Romania. It discharges into the Șușița in Ursați. Its length is 24 km (15 mi) and its basin size is 68 km^{2} (26 sq mi).

== Tributaries ==
The following rivers are tributaries to the river Suseni (from source to mouth):

- Left: Scărișoara, Scoaba Tinicioara
- Right: Pârâul Bogat, Scoaba Alunoasă, Igirosu, Valea Seacă, Clențu
