= Secuieni, Bacău =

Secuieni
- Commune
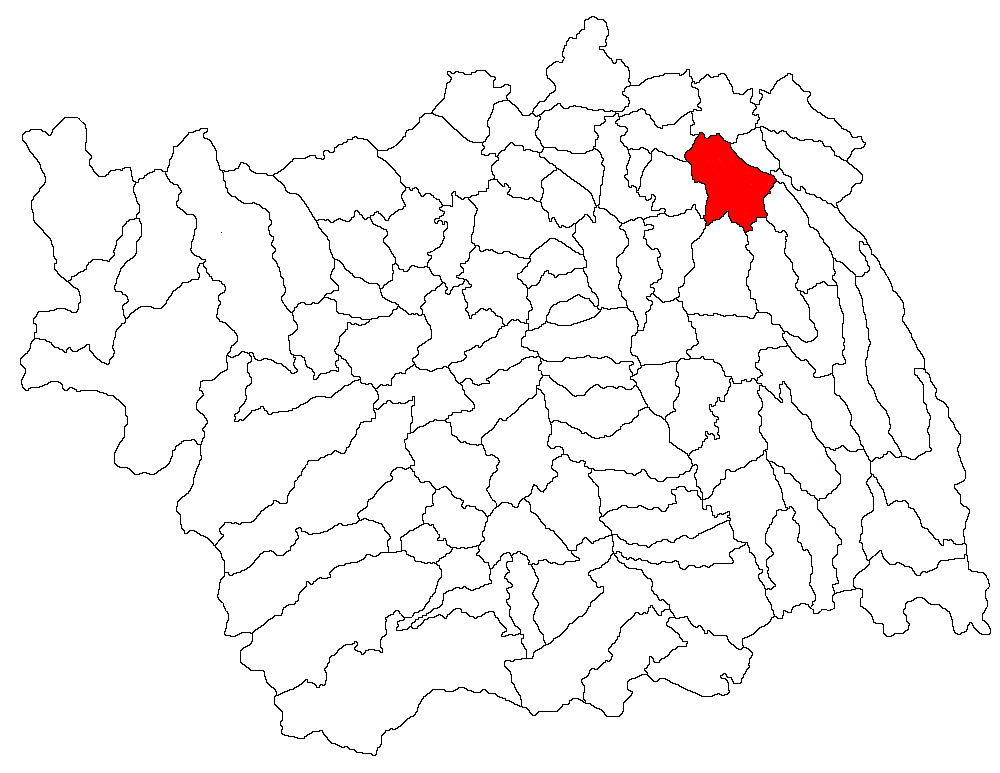
- Location in Bacău County

- Location in Romania
- Coordinates: 46°39′N 27°05′E
- Country: Romania
- County: Bacău

Government
  - Mayor (2024–2028): Dumitru Cosmin David (PNL)
- Area: 50.35 km^{2} (19.44 sq mi)
- Elevation: 257 m (843 ft)
- Population (2021-12-01): 2,098
  - Density: 41.67/km^{2} (107.9/sq mi)
- Time zone: UTC+02:00 (EET)
  - Summer (DST): UTC+03:00 (EEST)
- Postal code: 607560
- Area code: +(40) 0234
- Vehicle reg.: BC
- Website: primariasecuienibacau.ro

Secuieni is a commune in Bacău County, Western Moldavia, Romania. It is composed of seven villages: Berbinceni, Chiticeni, Fundeni, Glodișoarele, Secuieni, Valea Fânațului, and Văleni. Until 2005, it also included Bălușa, Ciuturești, Odobești, and Tisa-Silvestri villages, but these were split off that year to form Odobești Commune.

The commune is located in the northeastern part of the county, 18 km (11 mi) from the county seat, Bacău. It is crossed by national road DN2F, which connects Bacău to Vaslui.

== Natives ==
- Gheorghe Banu (1889—1957), hygienist and politician
