= Cioiana =

- Location within Romania

Location
- Country: Romania
- Counties: Gorj County
- Villages: Țicleni

Physical characteristics
- Mouth: Jiu
  - location: Peșteana-Jiu
  - coordinates: 44.8422°N 23.2950°E
- Length: 26 km (16 mi)
- Basin size: 179 km^{2} (69 sq mi)

Basin features
- Progression: Jiu→ Danube→ Black Sea
- Tributaries
  - right: Brătuia, Lumedia, Valea Mare

The Cioiana is a left tributary of the river Jiu in Romania. It discharges into the Jiu in Peșteana-Jiu. Its length is 26 km (16 mi) and its basin size is 179 km^{2} (69 sq mi).
