= Drănic =

- Commune
- Location in Romania
- Coordinates: 44°3′N 23°51′E
- Country: Romania
- County: Dolj
- Area: 80.21 km^{2} (30.97 sq mi)
- Population (2021-12-01): 2,260
  - Density: 28.2/km^{2} (73.0/sq mi)
- Time zone: UTC+02:00 (EET)
  - Summer (DST): UTC+03:00 (EEST)
- Vehicle reg.: DJ

Drănic is a commune in Dolj County, Oltenia, Romania with a population of 3,007 people. It is composed of four villages: Booveni, Drănic, Foișor and Padea.

== Natives ==
- Nicolae Dinculeanu
- Ionel Gane
