= Ionești, Gorj =

Ionești
- Commune
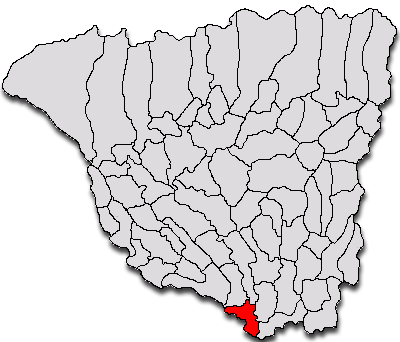
- Location in Gorj County

- Location in Romania
- Coordinates: 44°37′N 23°26′E
- Country: Romania
- County: Gorj
- Subdivisions: Gura Șușiței, Iliești, Ionești, Picu
- Area: 39.96 km^{2} (15.43 sq mi)
- Population (2021-12-01): 2,030
  - Density: 50.8/km^{2} (132/sq mi)
- Time zone: UTC+02:00 (EET)
  - Summer (DST): UTC+03:00 (EEST)
- Vehicle reg.: GJ

Ionești is a commune in Gorj County, Oltenia, Romania. It is composed of four villages: Gura Șușiței, Iliești, Ionești and Picu.
