= Defileul Jiului National Park =

Protected area in Romania

- Parcul Național Defileu Jiului
- IUCN category II (national park)
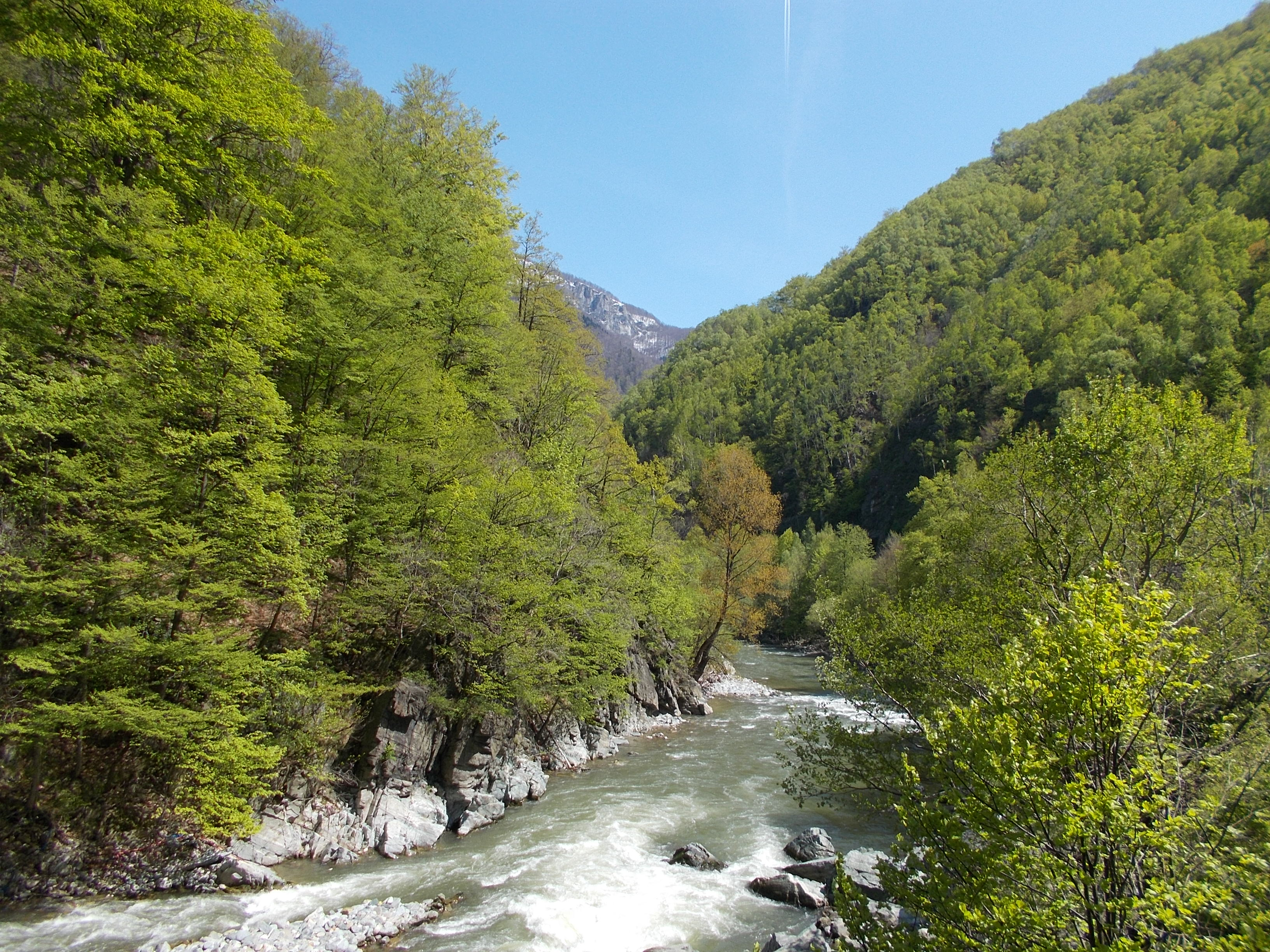
- Jiu Valley

- Location within Romania
- Location: Romania; Gorj County; Hunedoara County
- Nearest city: Petroșani
- Coordinates: 45.272°N 23.368°E
- Area: 11,127 hectares (27,500 acres)
- Established: 2005
- Website: www.defileuljiului.ro

Jiu Valley (3D map)

The Defileul Jiului National Park (Romanian: Parcul Național Defileul Jiului) is a protected area (national park category II IUCN) situated in Romania on the administrative territory of counties Gorj (92%) and Hunedoara (8%).

== Location ==
The National Park is located along the gorge formed by the Jiu River between the Vâlcan Mountains and Parâng Mountains (subgroup of mountains in the Southern Carpathians) in the northern part of Gorj County.

== Description ==
Defileul Jiului National Park with an area of 11,127 ha (27,500 acres) was declared protected area by the Government Decision Number 1581 in 2005 (published in Romanian Official Paper Number 38 on January 12, 2006) and represents an area that shelters a large variety of flora and fauna.

== See also ==
- Jiu Valley
- Vulcan Pass
