= Valea Mare de Criș =

Valea Mare de Criş may refer to several villages in Romania:

- Valea Mare de Criş, a village in Borod Commune, Bihor County
- Valea Mare de Criş, a village in Tomeşti Commune, Hunedoara County
