= C. A. Rosetti, Buzău =

C.A. Rosetti
- Commune
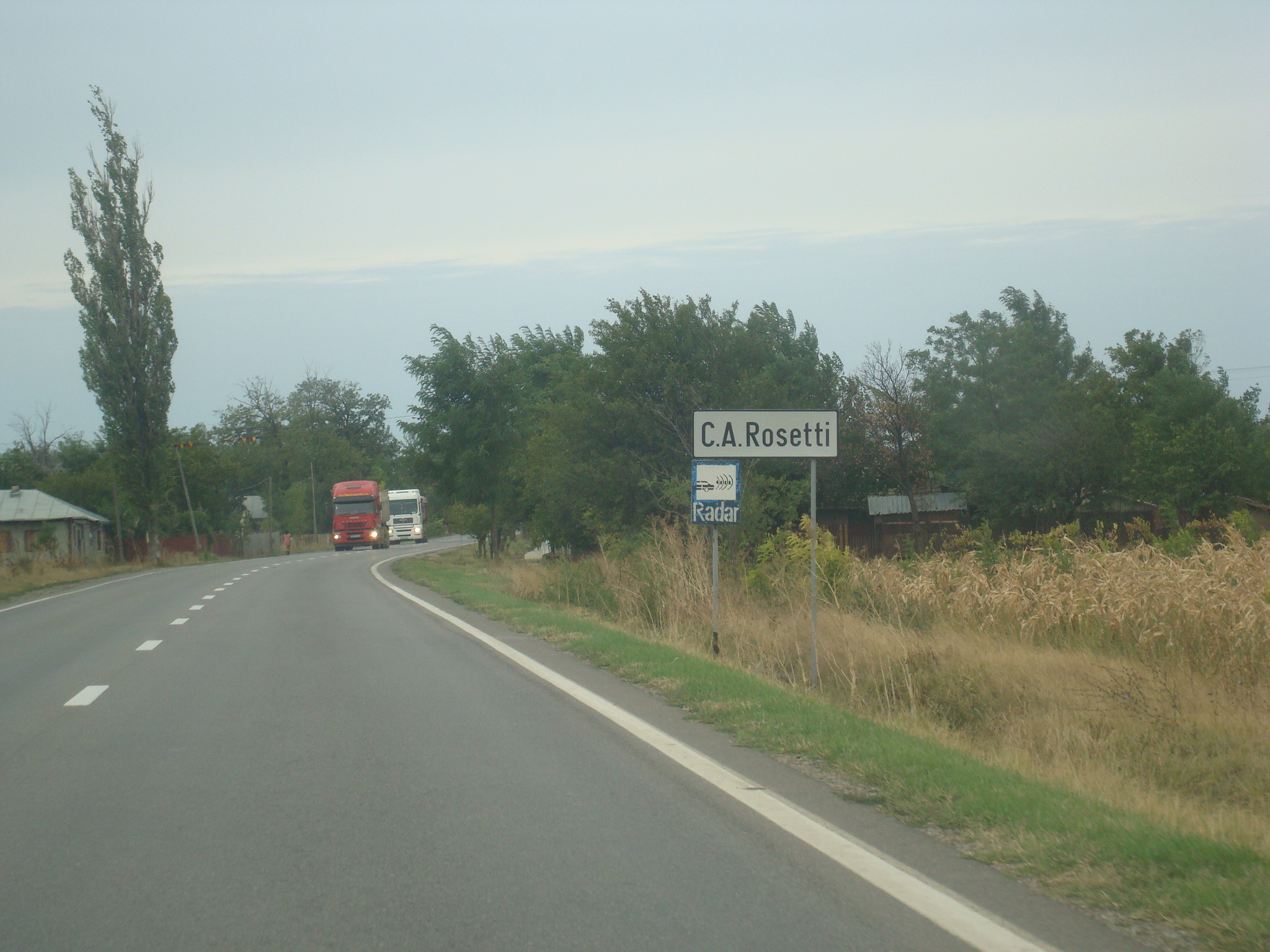

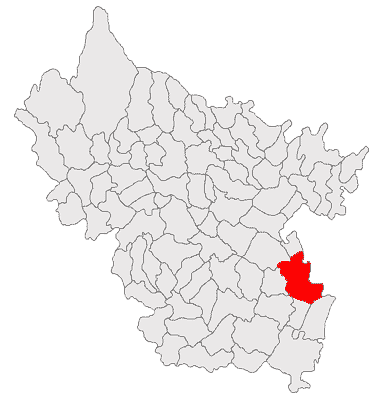
- Location in Buzău County

- Location in Romania
- Coordinates: 45°2′N 27°9′E
- Country: Romania
- County: Buzău
- Subdivisions: Bălteni, Bâlhacu, C.A. Rosetti, Cotu Ciorii, Lunca, Vizireni

Government
  - Mayor (2020–2024): Costel Crăciun (PRO)
- Area: 111.41 km^{2} (43.02 sq mi)
- Elevation: 48 m (157 ft)
- Population (2021-12-01): 3,049
  - Density: 27.37/km^{2} (70.88/sq mi)
- Time zone: UTC+02:00 (EET)
  - Summer (DST): UTC+03:00 (EEST)
- Postal code: 127120
- Area code: +(40) 238
- Vehicle reg.: BZ
- Website: primariacarosetti.ro

C.A. Rosetti is a commune in Buzău County, Muntenia, Romania. It is composed of six villages: Bălteni, Bâlhacu, C.A. Rosetti, Cotu Ciorii, Lunca, and Vizireni.

The commune was named after the liberal Wallachian politician Constantin Alexandru Rosetti, who used to own an estate in the commune.

C.A. Rosetti commune is located in the eastern part of the county, on the border with Brăila County, 31 km (19 mi) from the county seat, Buzău.

Historical population
Year	Pop.	±%
2002	4,254	—
2011	3,713	−12.7%
2021	3,049	−17.9%
Source: Census data
