= Turcinești =

- Commune
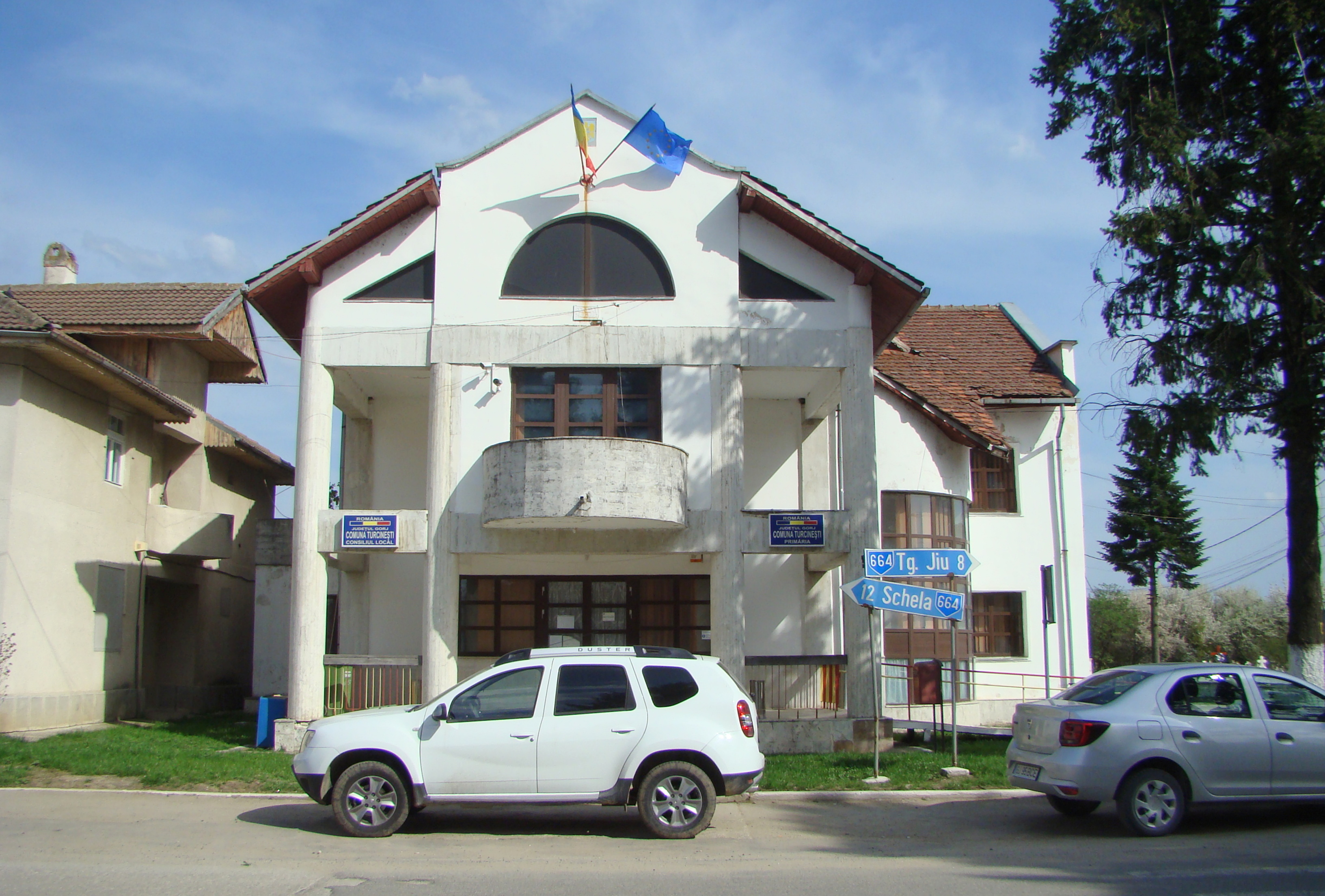
- Turcinești town hall

- Location in Romania
- Coordinates: 45°06′N 23°20′E
- Country: Romania
- County: Gorj
- Subdivisions: Cartiu, Horezu, Rugi, Turcinești

Government
  - Mayor (2020–2024): Dumitru Modrea (PNL)
- Area: 30.48 km^{2} (11.77 sq mi)
- Elevation: 239 m (784 ft)
- Population (2021-12-01): 2,058
  - Density: 67.52/km^{2} (174.9/sq mi)
- Time zone: UTC+02:00 (EET)
  - Summer (DST): UTC+03:00 (EEST)
- Postal code: 217530
- Vehicle reg.: GJ
- Website: turcinesti.ro

Turcinești is a commune in Gorj County, Oltenia, Romania. It is composed of four villages: Cartiu, Horezu, Rugi, and Turcinești.
