= Bălteni, Olt =

Bălteni
- Commune
- Location in Romania
- Coordinates: 44°26′51″N 24°32′11″E
- Country: Romania
- County: Olt
- Area: 33.35 km^{2} (12.88 sq mi)
- Elevation: 192 m (630 ft)
- Population (2021-12-01): 1,579
  - Density: 47/km^{2} (120/sq mi)
- Time zone: EET/EEST (UTC+2/+3)
- Postal code: 237331
- Vehicle reg.: OT

Bălteni is a commune in Olt County, Muntenia, Romania. It is composed of a single village, Bălteni.
