= Lainici Monastery =

Heritage site in Gorj County, Romania

Coordinates: 45°15′50.75″N 23°23′32.90″E

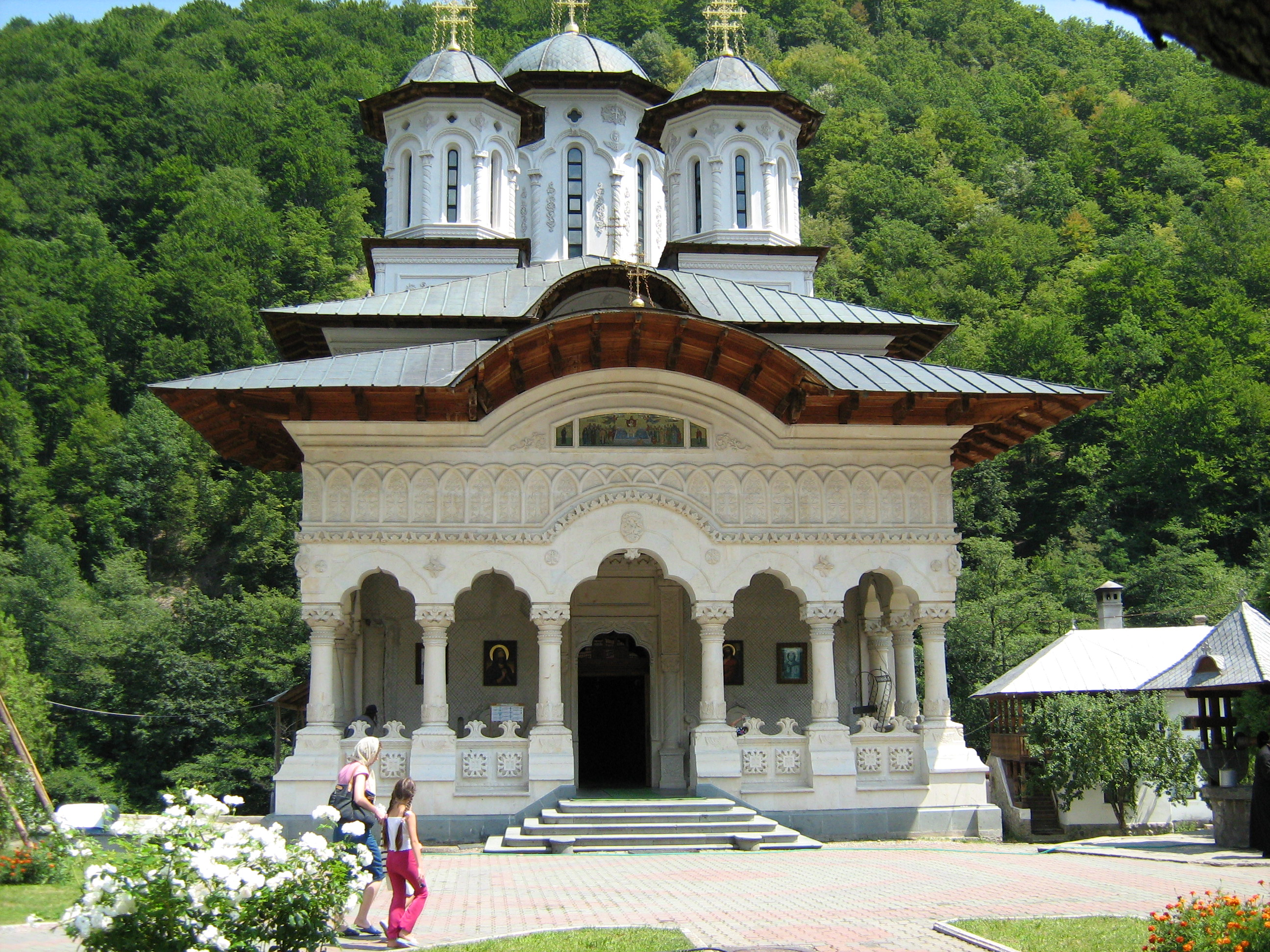

Religion
- Affiliation: Romanian Orthodox Church

Location
- Location: Bumbești-Jiu, Gorj County, Romania
- Interactive map of Lainici Monastery

Architecture
- Groundbreaking: 1817
- Materials: stone, brick

The Lainici Monastery is a Romanian Orthodox monastery located 32 km (20 miles) from Târgu Jiu.

== History ==
First mention of this monastery was in 14th century. The monastery was constructed during the reign of John Caradja Voivode between 1812 and 1817.

During the First World War, in 1916–1918, Lainici Monastery was severely damaged. The German troops at first were placed there, and then burned the monastery. The names of soldiers and officers who slept there and desecrated the church are still inscribed on the walls of the altar. All the valuables, including the bells, were stolen by the German soldiers. The archive of the monastery was burned, as well.

== Gallery ==
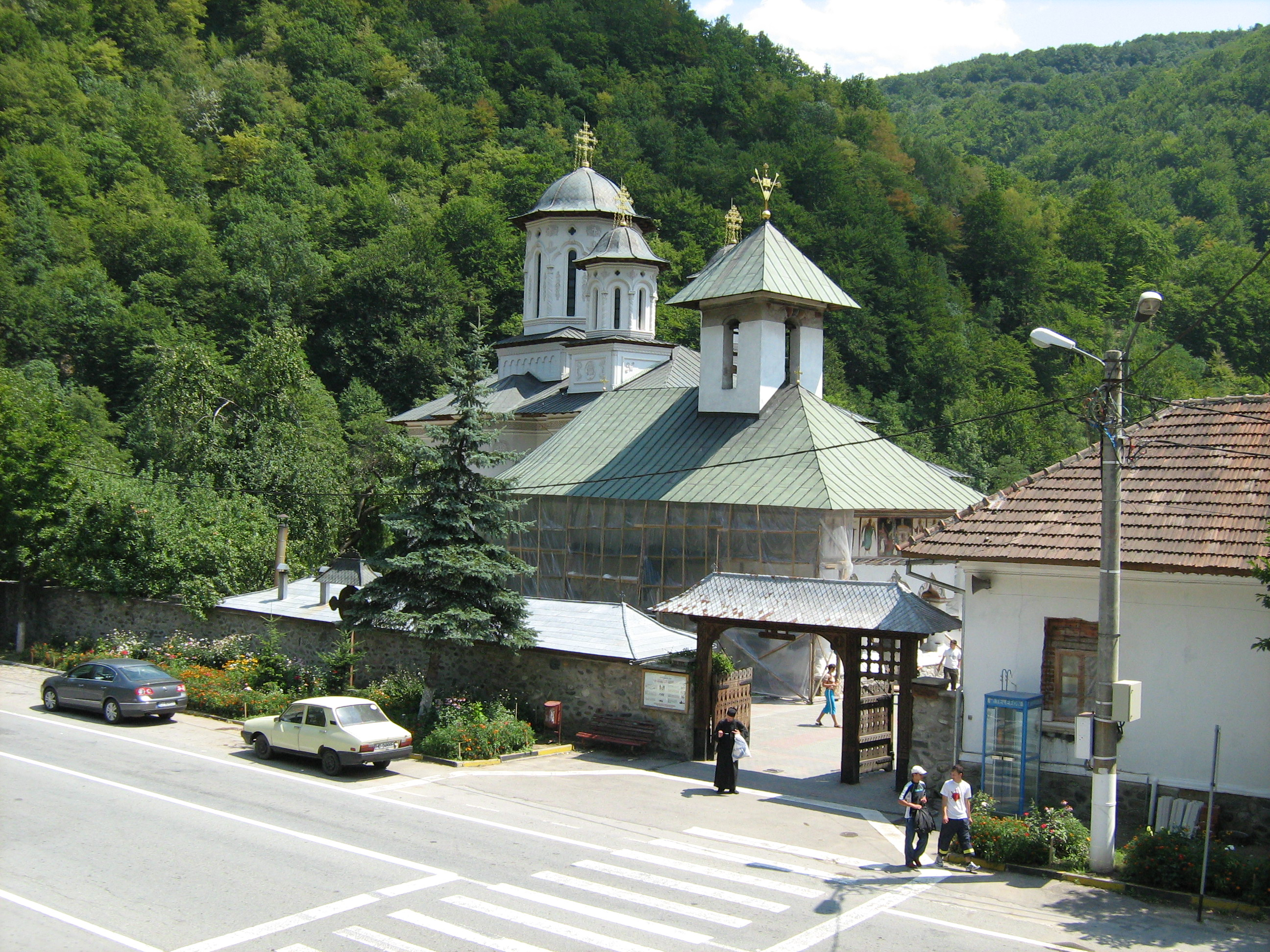
View

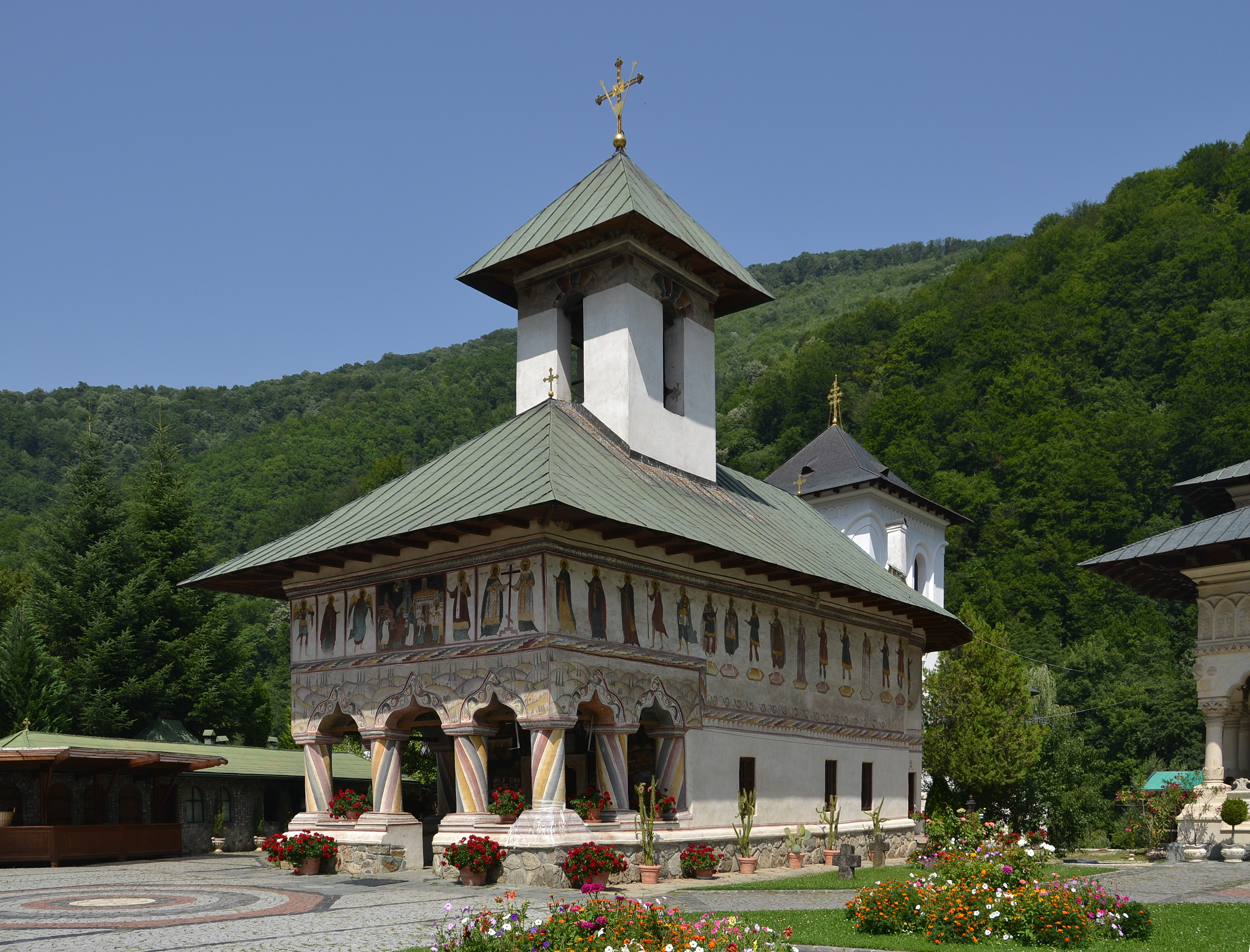
Old Church

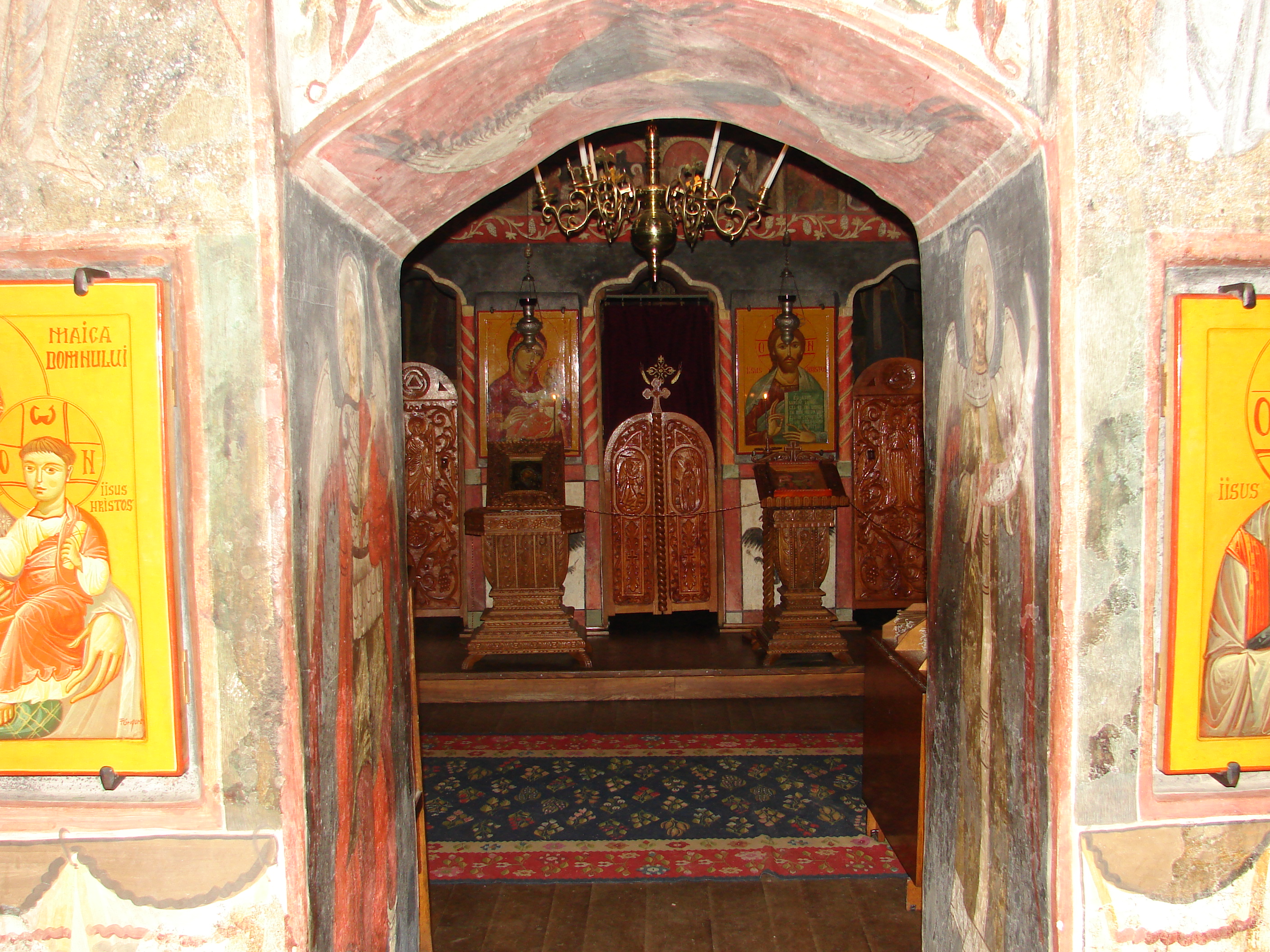
Old Church, interior

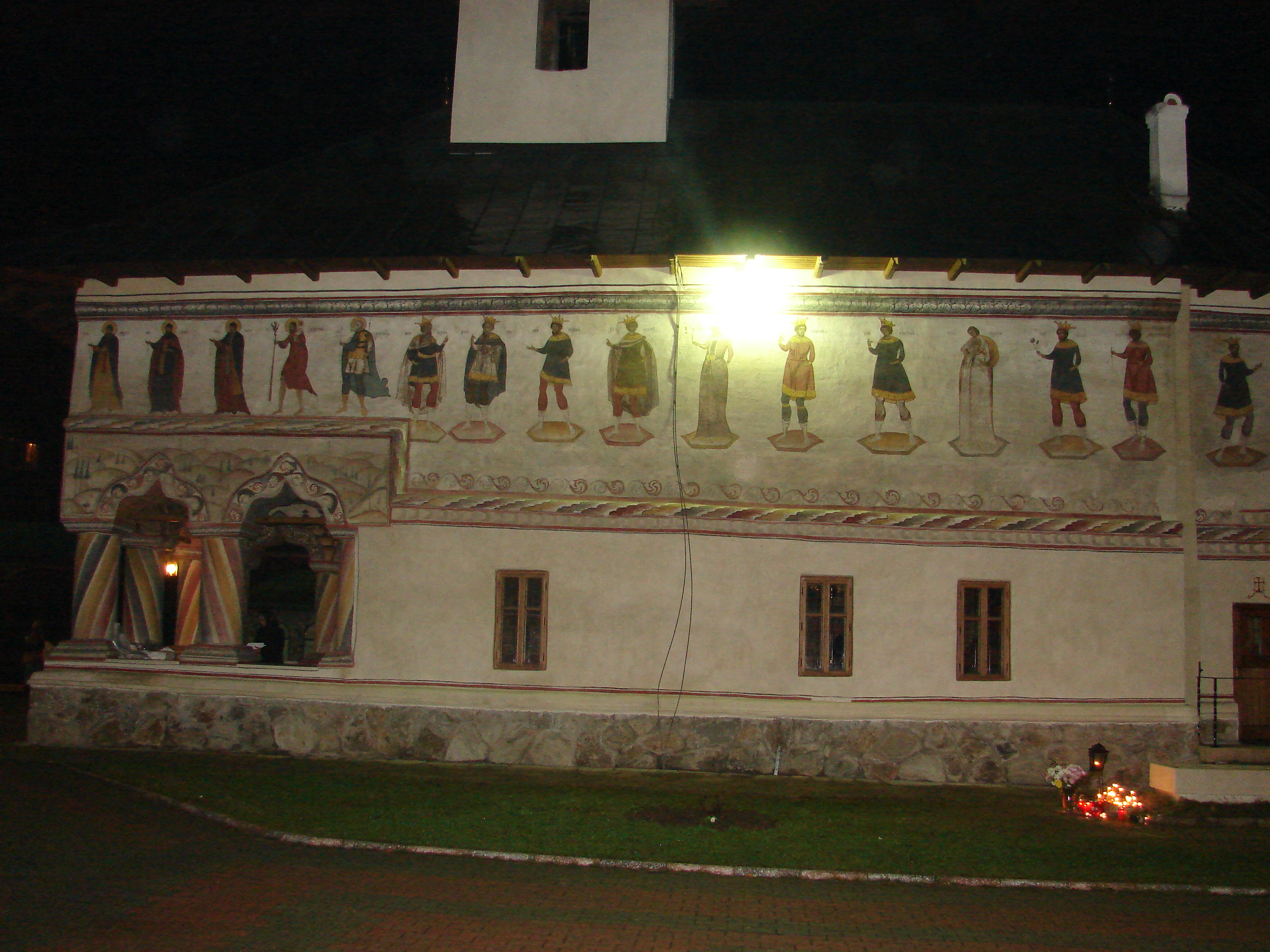
Old Church

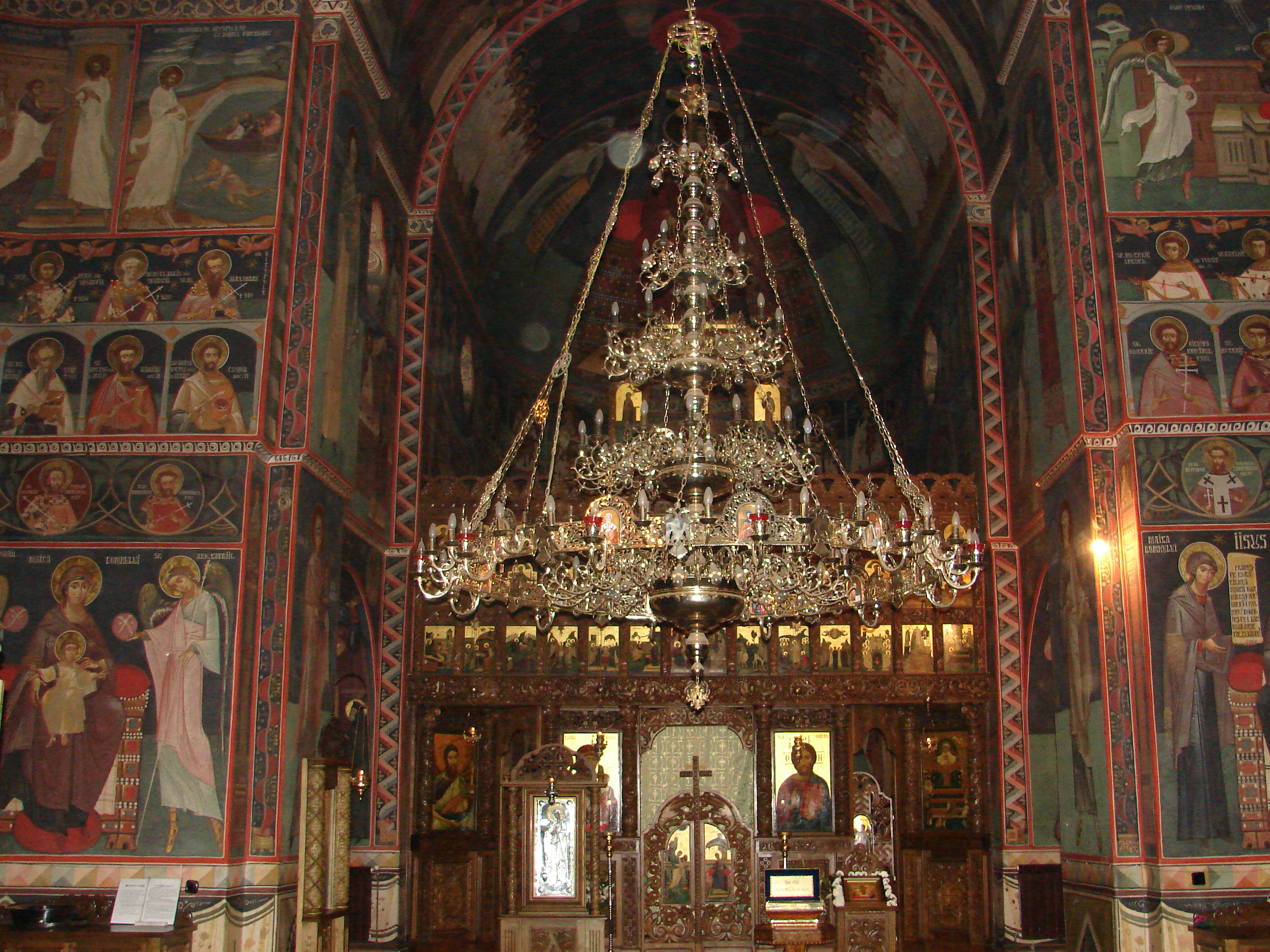
New church, interior

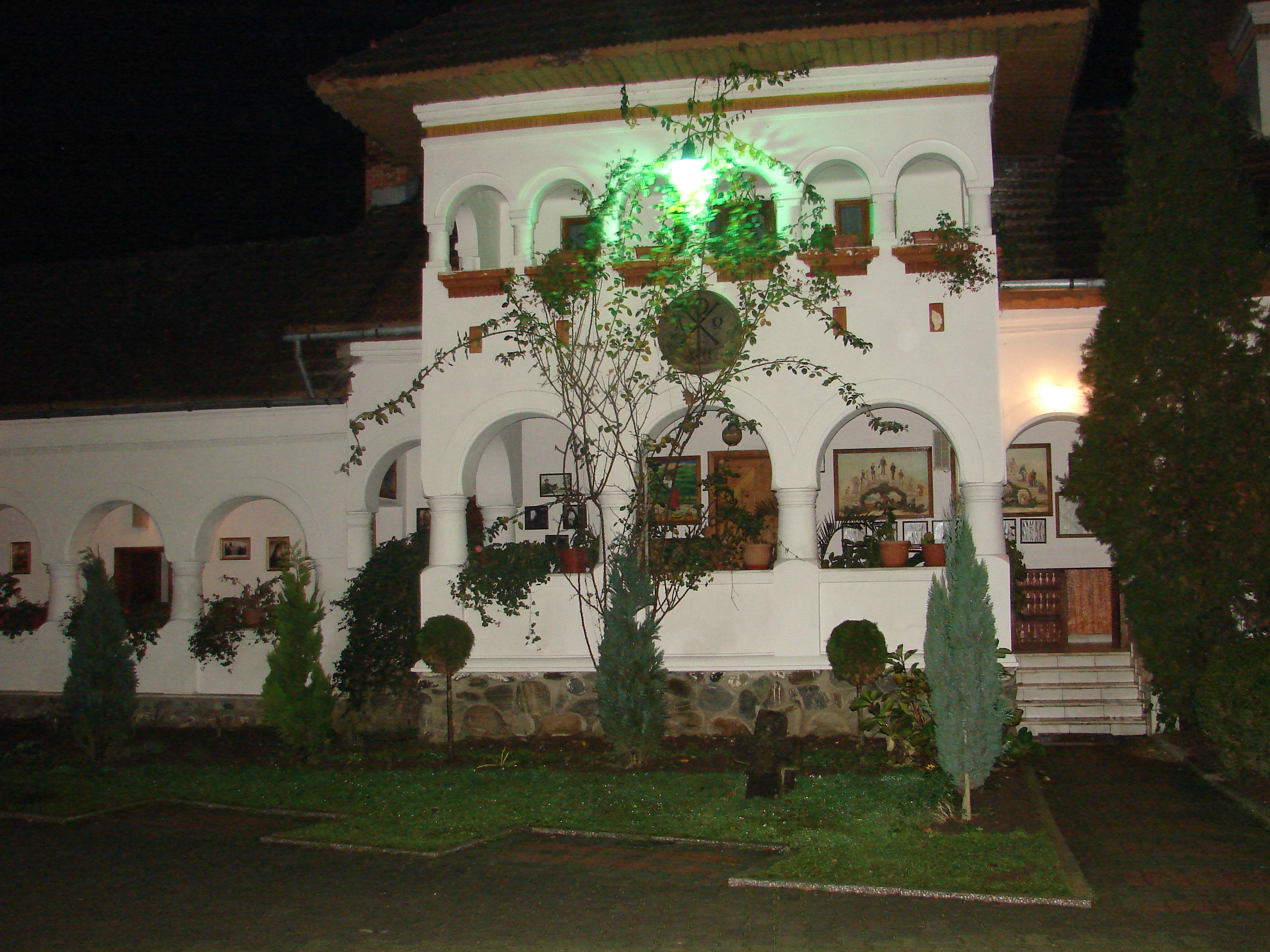
Body of cells

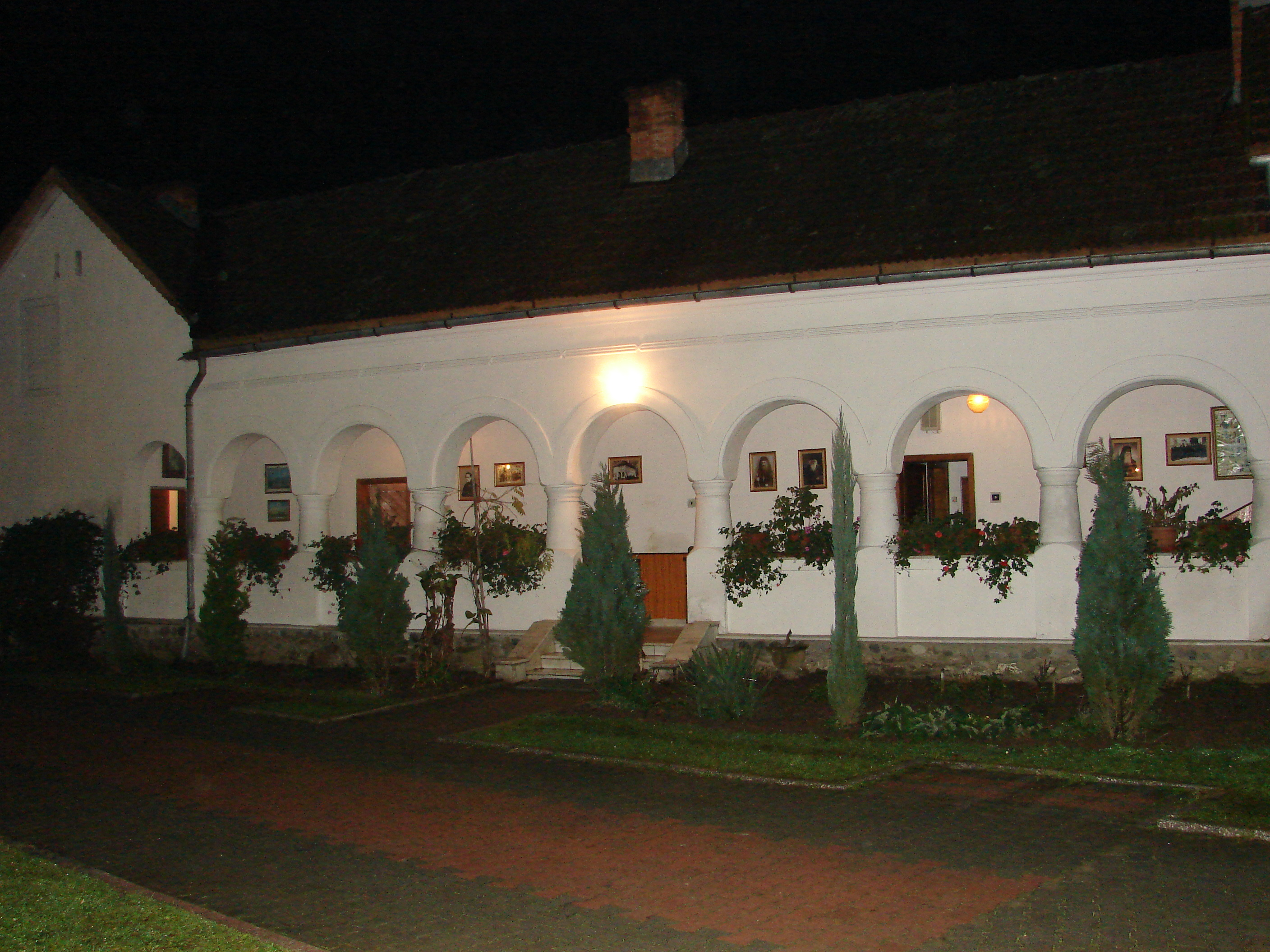
Body of cells

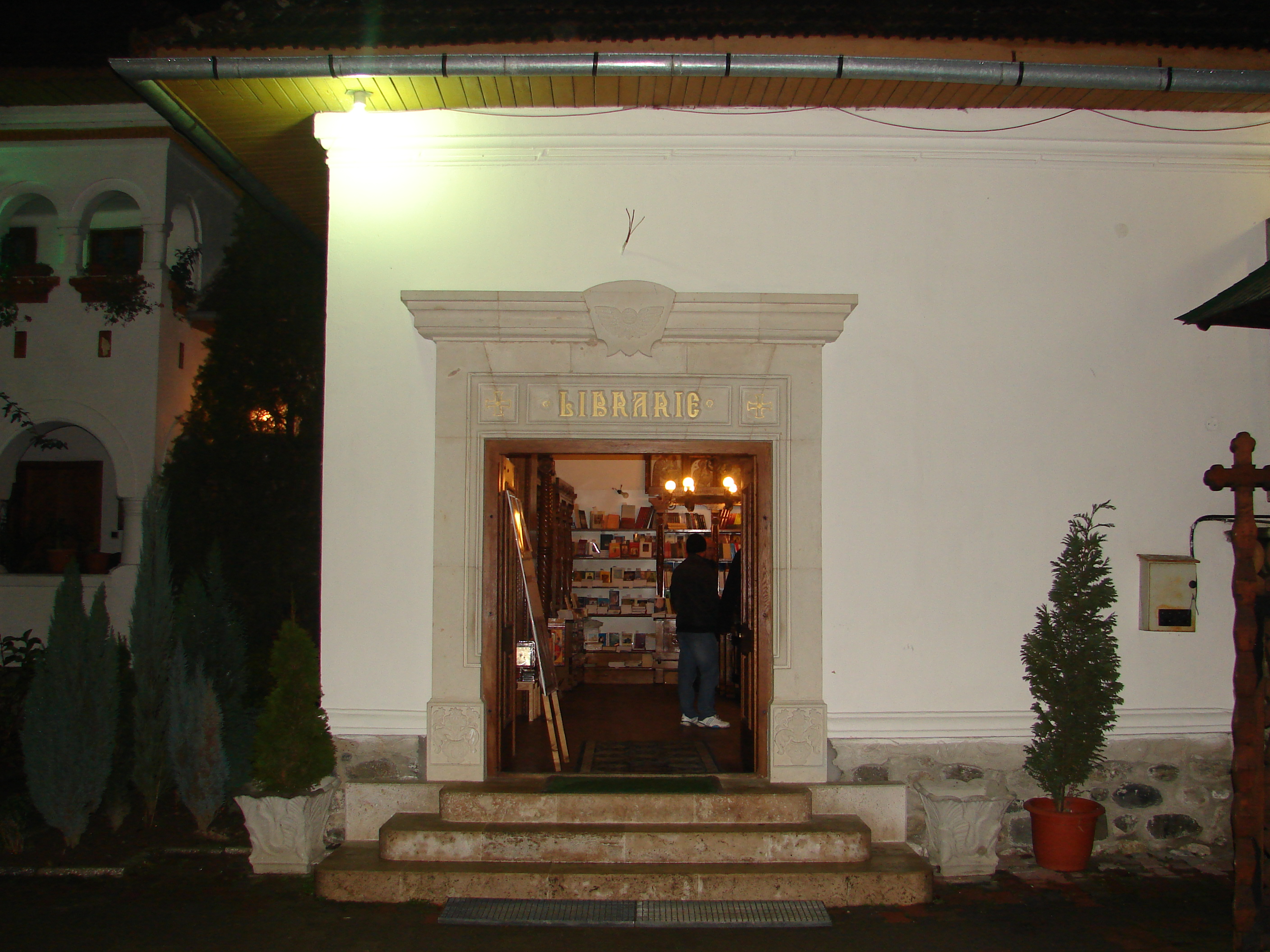
Book shop

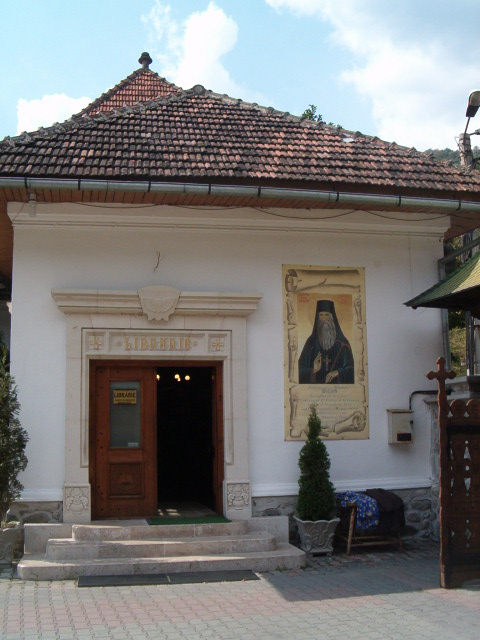
Book shop

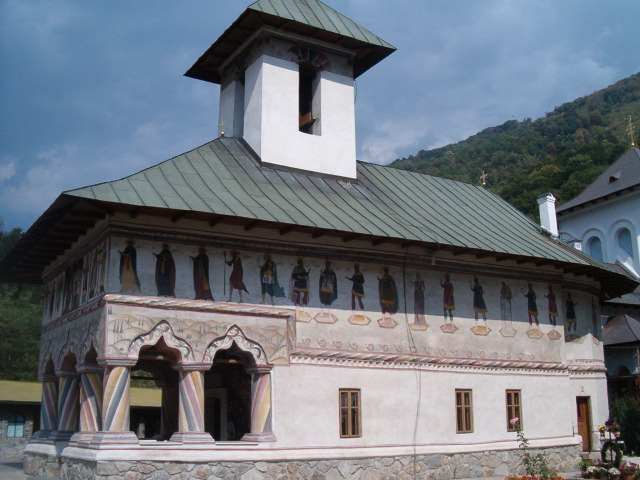
Old church

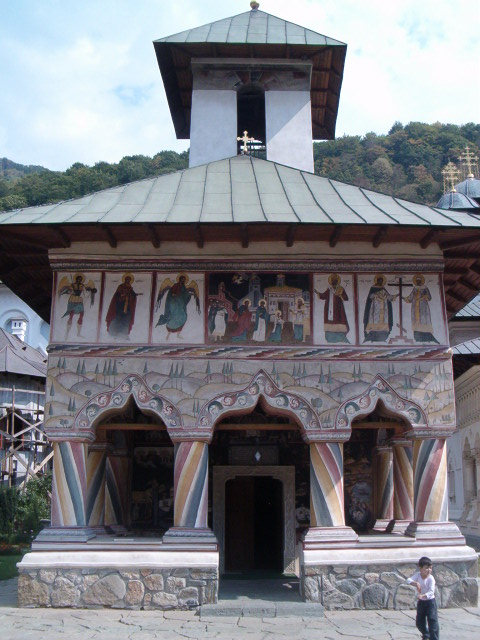
Old church

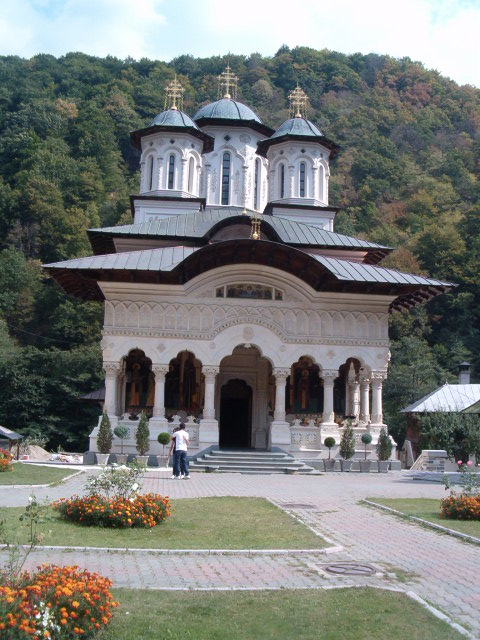
New church

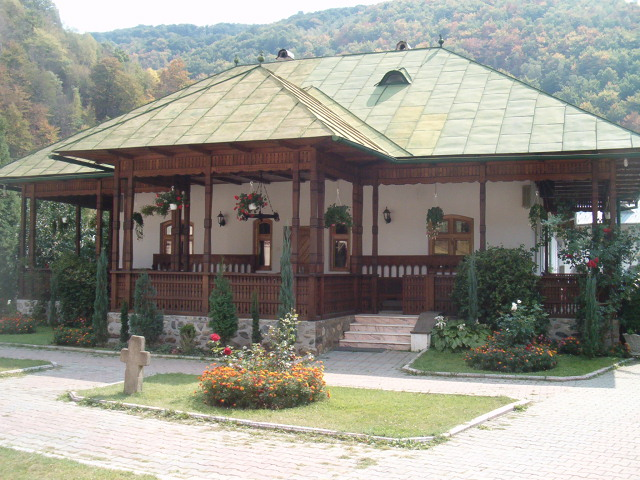
Body of cells

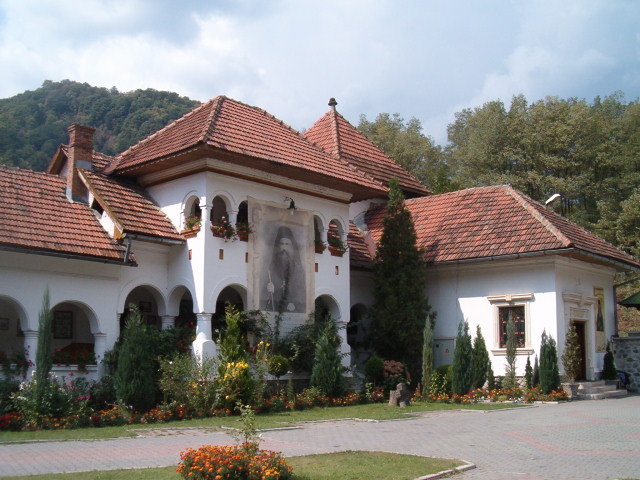
Body of cells
