= Bâlteni =

- Commune
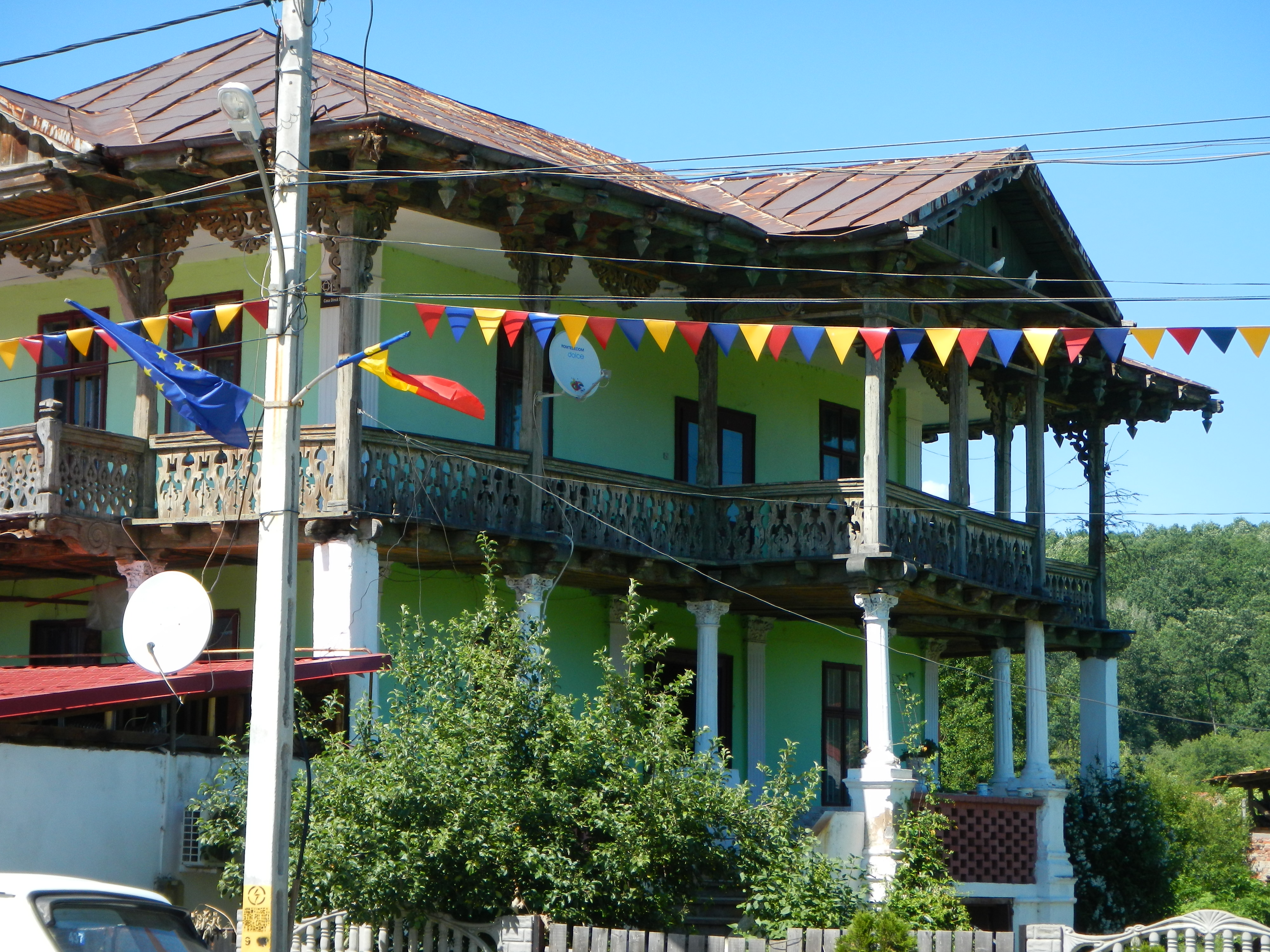
- The Dincă Schileru house in Bâlteni

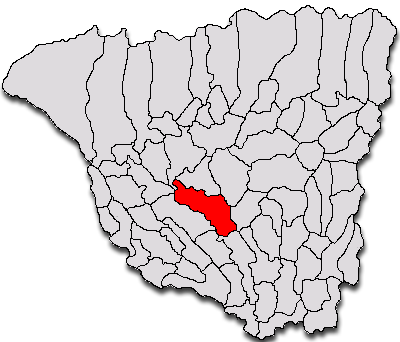
- Location in Gorj County

- Location in Romania
- Coordinates: 44°52′N 23°17′E
- Country: Romania
- County: Gorj
- Subdivisions: Bâlteni, Cocoreni, Moi, Peșteana-Jiu, Vlăduleni

Government
  - Mayor (2020–2024): Vasile Vlăduleanu (PNL)
- Area: 91.61 km^{2} (35.37 sq mi)
- Elevation: 147 m (482 ft)
- Population (2021-12-01): 6,359
  - Density: 69.41/km^{2} (179.8/sq mi)
- Time zone: UTC+02:00 (EET)
  - Summer (DST): UTC+03:00 (EEST)
- Postal code: 217060
- Vehicle reg.: GJ
- Website: primaria-bîlteni.ro

Bâlteni is a commune in Gorj County, Oltenia, Romania. It is composed of five villages: Bâlteni, Cocoreni, Moi, Peșteana-Jiu, and Vlăduleni.

The commune is situated 228 kilometres (142 mi) west of Bucharest, 18 kilometres (11 mi) south of Târgu Jiu, and 74 kilometres (46 mi) north-west of Craiova.

== Natives ==
- Vasile Roaită (1914–1933), railway worker

== See also ==
- Bălteni (disambiguation)
