= Schela, Gorj =

Schela
- Commune
- Location in Romania
- Coordinates: 45°10′N 23°18′E
- Country: Romania
- County: Gorj
- Subdivisions: Arsuri, Gornăcel, Păjiștele, Sâmbotin, Schela
- Population (2021-12-01): 1,598
- Time zone: UTC+02:00 (EET)
  - Summer (DST): UTC+03:00 (EEST)
- Vehicle reg.: GJ

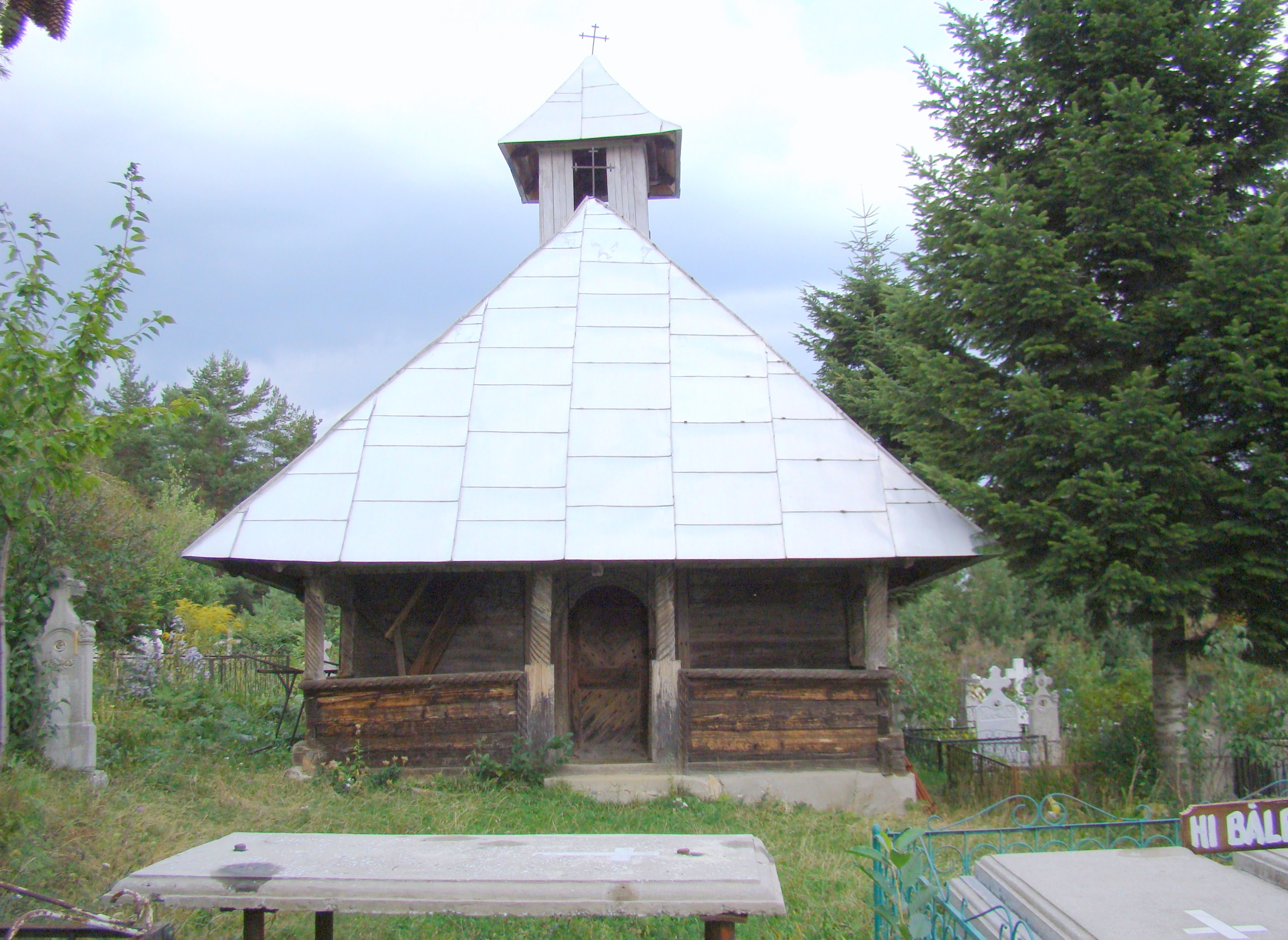
A Cornet Church in Schela.

Schela is a commune in Gorj County, Oltenia, Romania. It is composed of five villages: Arsuri, Gornăcel, Păjiștele, Sâmbotin (the commune centre) and Schela.
