= Odobești, Bacău =

Odobești
- Commune
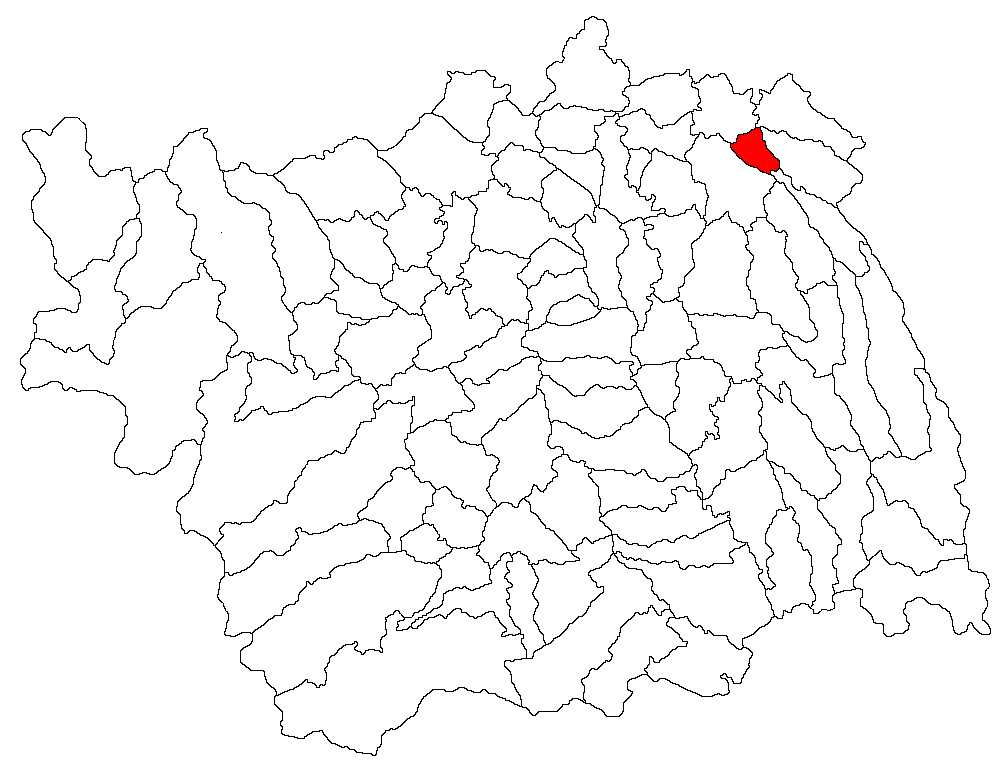
- Location in Bacău County

- Location in Romania
- Coordinates: 46.6728°N 27.1315°E
- Country: Romania
- County: Bacău

Government
  - Mayor (2024–2028): Andriana Ojog (PSD)
- Area: 43.63 km^{2} (16.85 sq mi)
- Elevation: 287 m (942 ft)
- Population (2021-12-01): 2,295
  - Density: 52.60/km^{2} (136.2/sq mi)
- Time zone: UTC+02:00 (EET)
  - Summer (DST): UTC+03:00 (EEST)
- Postal code: 607568
- Area code: +(40) 0234
- Vehicle reg.: BC
- Website: www.comuna-odobesti.ro

Odobești is a commune in Bacău County, Western Moldavia, Romania. It is composed of four villages: Bălușa, Ciuturești, Odobești, and Tisa-Silvestri. These were part of Secuieni Commune until 2005, when they were split off to form a separate commune.
