= Stănești, Gorj =

Stănești
- Commune
- Location in Romania
- Coordinates: 45°07′N 23°15′E
- Country: Romania
- County: Gorj
- Subdivisions: Alexeni, Bălani, Călești, Curpen, Măzăroi, Obreja, Pârvulești, Stănești, Vaidei, Vălari

Government
  - Mayor (2020–2024): Constantin Bicheru (PSD)
- Area: 100.08 km^{2} (38.64 sq mi)
- Population (2021-12-01): 2,232
  - Density: 22.30/km^{2} (57.76/sq mi)
- Time zone: UTC+02:00 (EET)
  - Summer (DST): UTC+03:00 (EEST)
- Vehicle reg.: GJ

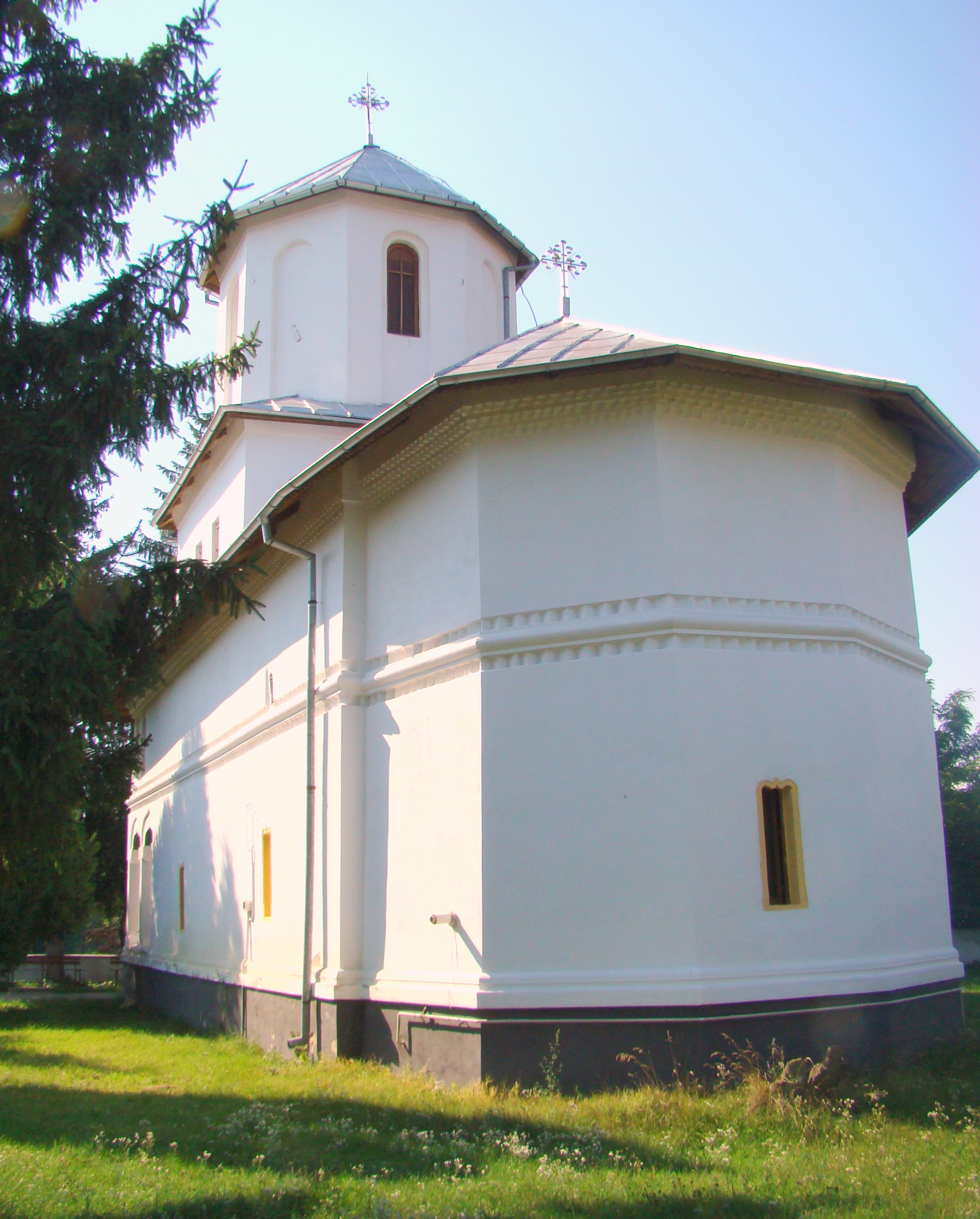
"All Saints' Sunday" Church, Stănești village; Stănești commune

Stănești is a commune in Gorj County, Oltenia, Romania. It is composed of ten villages: Alexeni, Bălani, Călești, Curpen, Măzăroi, Obreja, Pârvulești, Stănești, Vaidei and Vălari.
