= Șușița (Gorj) =

- Location within Romania

Location
- Country: Romania
- Counties: Gorj County
- Villages: Vaidei, Curpen, Alexeni, Stănești, Ursați

Physical characteristics
- Source: Vâlcan Mountains
- Mouth: Jiu
  - location: Târgu Jiu
  - coordinates: 44.9864°N 23.2316°E
- Length: 37 km (23 mi)
- Basin size: 234 km^{2} (90 sq mi)
- Discharge
  - location: *
  - maximum: 369 m^{3}/s (13,000 cu ft/s)

Basin features
- Progression: Jiu→ Danube→ Black Sea
- Tributaries
  - left: Cornul
  - right: Suseni

The Șușița (in its upper course also: Straja or Amaru) is a right tributary of the river Jiu in Romania. It discharges into the Jiu near the city Târgu Jiu. Its length is 37 km (23 mi) and its basin size is 234 km^{2} (90 sq mi).

== Tributaries ==
The following rivers are tributaries to the river Șușița (from source to mouth):

- Left: Grivele, Cartianu, Cracu, Zănoaga, Răchițelii, Strâmbu, Jara, Mitări, Cornul
- Right: Valea Boului, Cârligu, Frasin, Măcriș, Corcotu, Țiganu, Tragoe, Valea Mare, Balta Verde, Richita, Valea Socilor, Suseni, Iaz
