= Jiu (river) =

River in Romania

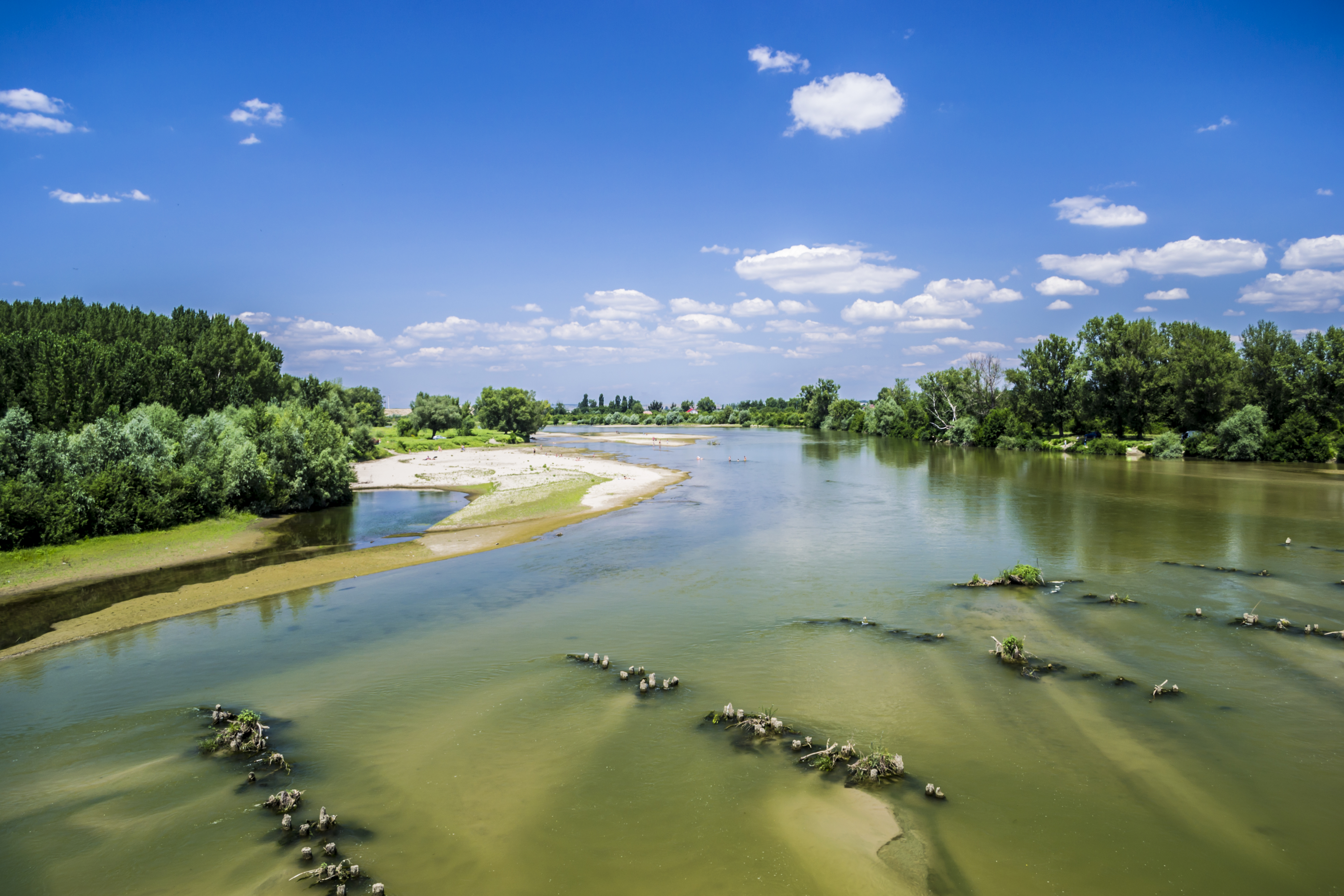
- View of the Jiu passing Craiova, Dolj County, Romania

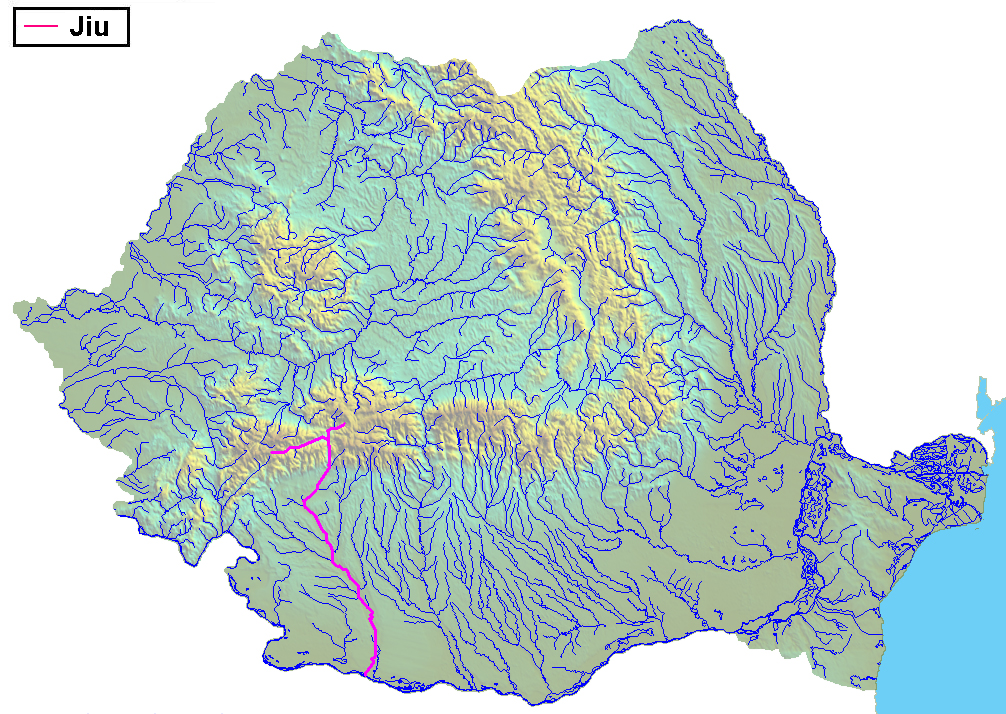
- The Jiu in Romania

Location
- Country: Romania
- Counties: Hunedoara; Gorj; Dolj
- Cities: Petroșani (Jiul de Est); Lupeni (Jiul de Vest); Târgu Jiu; Craiova

Physical characteristics
- Source: Confluence of headwaters Jiul de Vest and Jiul de Est, near Petroșani, Hunedoara
  - coordinates: 45°22′07″N 23°22′04″E
  - elevation: 554 m (1,818 ft)
- Mouth: Danube
  - location: near Bechet, Dolj
  - coordinates: 43°46′41″N 23°48′48″E
- Length: 340 km (210 mi)
- Basin size: 10,080 km^{2} (3,890 sq mi)
- Depth
  - maximum: 120 m (393 ft) (Craiova)
- Discharge
  - location: mouth
  - average: 86 m^{3}/s (3,000 cu ft/s)

Basin features
- Progression: Danube→ Black Sea
- Tributaries
  - left: Jiul de Est, Gilort, Amaradia
  - right: Jiul de Vest, Motru

The Jiu (Romanian: [ʒiw]; Hungarian: Zsil [ʒil]; German: Schil or Schiel; Latin: Rabon) is a river in southern Romania. It is formed near Petroșani by the confluence of the headwaters Jiul de Vest and the Jiul de Est.

It flows southward through the Romanian counties of Hunedoara, Gorj, and Dolj before flowing into the Danube near Zăval, a few kilometers upstream from the Bulgarian city of Oryahovo. It is 339 kilometres (211 mi) long, including its source river, Jiul de Vest. It has a basin of 10,430 km^{2} (4,030 sq mi). Its average discharge at the mouth is 97 m^{3}/s (3,400 cu ft/s).

The upper Jiu Valley, around Petroșani and Lupeni, is Romania's principal coal mining region.

== Towns and cities ==
The following towns are situated along the Jiu, from source to mouth: Petroșani (Jiul de Est), Lupeni (Jiul de Vest), Bumbești-Jiu, Târgu Jiu, Turceni, Filiași, and Craiova.

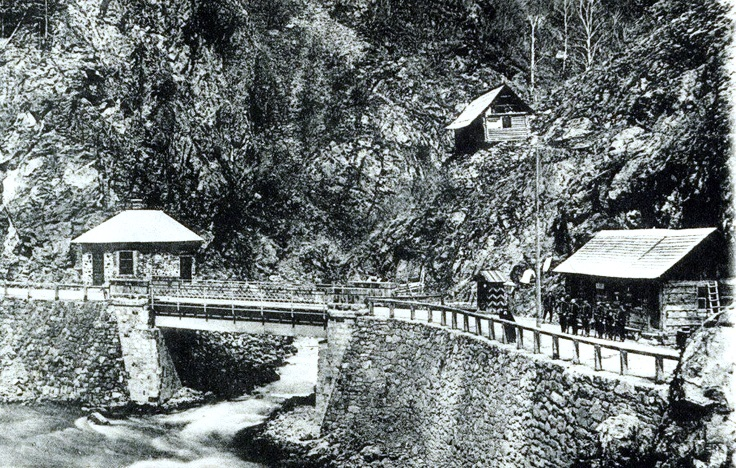
Border checkpoint between Romania and Austria-Hungary in the Jiu Gorge (c. 1914)

== Tributaries ==
The following rivers are tributaries of the Jiu (from source to mouth):

- Left: Jiul de Est, Izvor, Polatiștea, Radul, Pârâul Alb, Păiușu, Chițiu, Sadu, Curpenoasa, Tetila, Iazu Topilelor, Hodinău, Amaradia (Gorj), Dâmbova, Cioiana, Gilort, Fratoștița, Cârnești, Răcari, Brădești, Amaradia (Dolj), Preajba, Lumaș, Leu, Gioroc
- Right: Jiul de Vest, Cândețu, Murga Mică, Murga Mare, Dumitra, Cerbănașu, Bratcu, Porcu, Sâmbotin, Cartiu, Pietroasa, Șușița (Gorj), Tismana, Timișeni, Jilț, Ceplea, Șușița (Mehedinți), Motru, Bâlta, Racovița, Argetoaia, Raznic, Tejac, Ulm, Prodila

== See also ==
- Jiu Valley
