= Bumbești-Jiu =

- Town
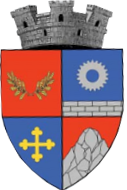
- Coat of arms

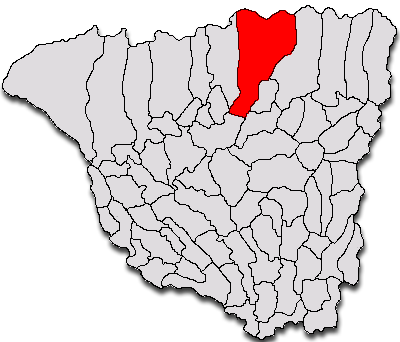
- Location in Gorj County

- Location in Romania
- Coordinates: 45°10′43″N 23°22′53″E
- Country: Romania
- County: Gorj

Government
  - Mayor (2024–2028): Constantin Bobaru (PSD)
- Area: 210 km^{2} (81 sq mi)
- Population (2021-12-01): 7,684
  - Density: 37/km^{2} (95/sq mi)
- Time zone: UTC+02:00 (EET)
  - Summer (DST): UTC+03:00 (EEST)
- Vehicle reg.: GJ
- Website: www.bumbesti-jiu.ro

Bumbești-Jiu (Romanian pronunciation: [bumˌbeʃtʲ ˈʒiw]) is a town in Gorj County, Oltenia, Romania, on the river Jiu. It administers four villages: Curtișoara, Lăzărești, Pleșa and Tetila. It officially became a town in 1989, as a result of the Romanian rural systematization program.

Historical population
Year	Pop.	±%
1992	11,111	—
2002	11,882	+6.9%
2011	8,932	−24.8%
2021	7,684	−14.0%
Source: Census data

The town features the Lainici Monastery, the Vișina Monastery (built in 1418), and a "Village Museum".

== Natives ==
- Dorin Arcanu (born 1970), footballer
- Corina Peptan (born 1978), chess player
- Dan Vîlceanu (born 1979), politician
