= AS Paroșeni Vulcan =

Romanian association football club

Paroșeni Vulcan
- Full name: Asociația Sportivă Paroșeni Vulcan
- Nickname(s): Minerii (The Miners); Negru-Albaștrii (The Black and Blue)
- Short name: Paroșeni
- Founded: 1970; 55 years ago as Minerul Paroșeni
- Dissolved: 1997; 28 years ago
- Ground: Paroșeni
- Capacity: 4,000

Asociația Sportivă Paroșeni Vulcan, better known as Minerul Paroșeni, was a Romanian football club based in Vulcan, Hunedoara County, founded in 1970 and dissolved in 1997.

== History ==
After three years of construction and exploration, the Paroșeni Mine began coal production on October 1966. By 1970, it was producing significant amounts of coal. During this period, the miners from Jiu-Paroșeni, a locality within Vulcan Municipality, passionate about sports, sought to establish their own sports identity, similar to other mining communities in the Jiu Valley. At the time, two teams from Vulcan were active in county football: Minerul Vulcan and Energia Paroșeni, both associated with the Vulcan Mine and Paroșeni Thermal Power Plant.

The club was established in 1970 as Minerul Paroșeni and initially competed in the Petroșani Municipal Championship, part of Hunedoara County's fifth tier of Romanian football. During its early years, the club played at a semi-amateur level, with key figures such as Grigore Popescu (president), Viorel Moțoc (president of the football section from 1970 to 1986), and coach Ioan Csucsi leading the team. The players mostly came from the local mining sectors, and matches were played at the Thermal Power Plant field.

After several seasons, the team finished 3rd in the 1972–73 Petroșani Municipal Championship and achieved 1st place in 1976–77 season, with Ștefan Frunză as the top scorer, earning promotion to the Hunedoara County Championship, the fourth tier of Romanian football. Among the players of that time, notable names include I. Bălan (goalkeeper), Iovu, Ivan, Ursa, and Gheța.

Minerul Paroșeni competed for three consecutive seasons in the fourth tier, finishing 10th in 1977–78, improving to 2nd in 1978–79—just two points behind Explorări Deva—and ultimately securing 1st place in 1979–80 under coach Tiberiu Benea. The team earned promotion to Divizia C after a 2–0 aggregate victory in the promotion play-off against Constructorul Târgu Jiu, the Gorj County winner. The squad that achieved promotion included, among others, Crecan, Stanci, Gânga, Urițescu, M. Florea, I. Popescu, Lascu, G. Iordache, B. Popescu, Leleșan, and Gâtan.

In the 1980–81 season, in a series featuring strong teams such as Carpați Mârșa, Sticla Arieșul Turda, and Victoria Călan, Minerul Paroșeni performed honorably in their debut season in the third division, finishing in 9th place. This was followed by four seasons in which they achieved the following rankings: 6th (1981–82), 9th (1982–83), 4th (1983-84), and 2nd (1984–85).

The Black and Blue team earned promotion to Divizia B in the 1985–86 season after a fierce battle with CSM Lugoj and Rapid Arad. The team coached by Tiberiu Benea included players such as Crecan, V. Bârsan, Dodenciu, Leleșan, Lixandru, Hădărean, C. Ispir, Adrian Rusu, Lăzăroiu, Gelu Bîrsan, Mircea Cristea, Neculai Băltaru, Gâtan, Romulus Matula, Sorin Henzel, and Dan Neiconi. Throughout these years, there was an intense rivalry with another local team, Minerul Știința Vulcan.

The 1986–87 Divizia B season was the best for "The Miners" finishing in a meritorious 6th place and qualifying for the Round of 32 in the Cupa României, being eliminated by Universitatea Craiova after a 1–1 draw following extra time and a 4–5 loss in a penalty shootout. The squad in that match, coached by Traian Benea, was composed of S. Homan — Dodenciu, Buzduga, Vișan, Hădărean — M. Cristea, Crăciun, Dicuț (min. 72 Bîrsan) — Lăzăroiu, Sălăjan, Băltaru (min. 75 Leleșan).

In the following season, the club was renamed AS Paroșeni Vulcan and finished in 7th place. The team relegated to Divizia C at the end of the 1988–89 season, finishing in 16th place, its lowest rank in the second tier.

Following their relegation, AS Paroșeni Vulcan spent the next eight seasons playing in Divizia C, with the best rank being 4th in the 1991–92 season. After finishing 19th in the 1996–97 season, AS Paroșeni Vulcan was relegated to Divizia D and, due to financial problems, merged with their main rival, Minerul Știința Vulcan.

== Honours ==
Divizia C

- Winners (1):1985–86
- Runners-up (1):1984–85

Hunedoara County Championship

- Winners (1):1979–80
- Runners-up (1):1978–79

=== Other performances ===
- Appearances in Liga II: 3
- Appearances in Liga III: 14
- Best finish in Liga II: 6th (1986–87)
- Best finish in Cupa României: Round of 32 (1986–87)

== League history ==
Season	Tier	Division	Place	Notes	Cupa României
1996–97	3	Divizia C (Seria III)	19th	Relegated	
1995–96	3	Divizia C (Seria III)	8th		
1994–95	3	Divizia C (Seria IV)	13th		
1993-94	3	Divizia C (Seria III)	9th		
1992–93	3	Divizia C (Seria III)	14th		
1991–92	3	Divizia C (Seria IX)	4th		
1990–91	3	Divizia C (Seria XI)	6th		
1989–90	3	Divizia C (Seria XI)	5th		
1988–89	2	Divizia B (Seria III)	16th	Relegated	
1987–88	2	Divizia B (Seria III)	7th		

Season	Tier	Division	Place	Notes	Cupa României
1986–87	2	Divizia B (Seria III)	6th		Round of 32
1985–86	3	Divizia C (Seria VIII)	1st (C)	Promoted	
1984–85	3	Divizia C (Seria XI)	2nd		
1983-84	3	Divizia C (Seria VIII)	4th		
1982–83	3	Divizia C (Seria IX)	9th		
1981–82	3	Divizia C (Seria VIII)	6th		
1980–81	3	Divizia C (Seria XI)	9th		
1979–80	4	County Championship (HD)	1st (C)	Promoted	
1978–79	4	County Championship (HD)	2nd		
1977–78	4	County Championship (HD)	10th		
