= Uricani Coal Mine =

Coal mine in Hunedoara County, Romania

Uricani Coal mine
- Location: Uricani, Hunedoara County, Romania
- Products: Coal
- Production: 543,000 tonnes
- Financial year: 2008
- Opened: 1980
- Closed: 2018
- Company: National Hard Coal Company

Uricani Coal Mine is an underground mining operation, one of the largest in Romania located in Uricani, one of six cities in the Jiu Valley region of Hunedoara County. The legal entity managing the Uricani mine is the National Hard Coal Company which was set up in 1998. The mine has reserves of 39.3 million tonnes of coal. After several fatal accidents and Romania's obligation regarding the reduction of the arrears of the CNH, the mine has been in the process of shutting down its operation since 2009.

== See also ==
- Jiu Valley
- League of Miners Unions of the Jiu Valley
