= Bărbăteni Coal Mine =

Mine in Romania

Bărbăteni Coal mine
- Location: Lupeni, Hunedoara County, Romania
- Products: Coal
- Production: 386,000 tonnes
- Financial year: 2008
- Opened: 1980
- Company: National Hard Coal Company

Bărbăteni Coal Mine is an underground mining exploitation, one of the largest in Romania located in Lupeni, one of six cities in the Jiu Valley region of Hunedoara County. The legal entity managing the Bărbăteni mine is the National Hard Coal Company which was set up in 1998. The mine has reserves of 27.9 million tonnes of coal.

== See also ==
- Jiu Valley
- League of Miners Unions of the Jiu Valley
