= Lonea Coal Mine =

Coal mine in Petrila, Romania

Lonea Coal mine
- Location: Petrila, Hunedoara County, Romania
- Products: Coal
- Production: 314,000 tonnes
- Financial year: 2008
- Opened: 1980
- Company: National Hard Coal Company

Lonea Coal Mine is an underground mining exploitation, one of the largest in Romania located in Petrila, one of six cities in the Jiu Valley region of Hunedoara County. The legal entity managing the Lonea mine is the National Hard Coal Company which was set up in 1998. The mine has reserves of 22.7 million tonnes of coal.

The coal mine is due to be closed by the end of 2024.

== See also ==
- Jiu Valley
- League of Miners Unions of the Jiu Valley
