= Lupeni Coal Mine =

Mine in Lupeni, Romania

Lupeni Coal mine
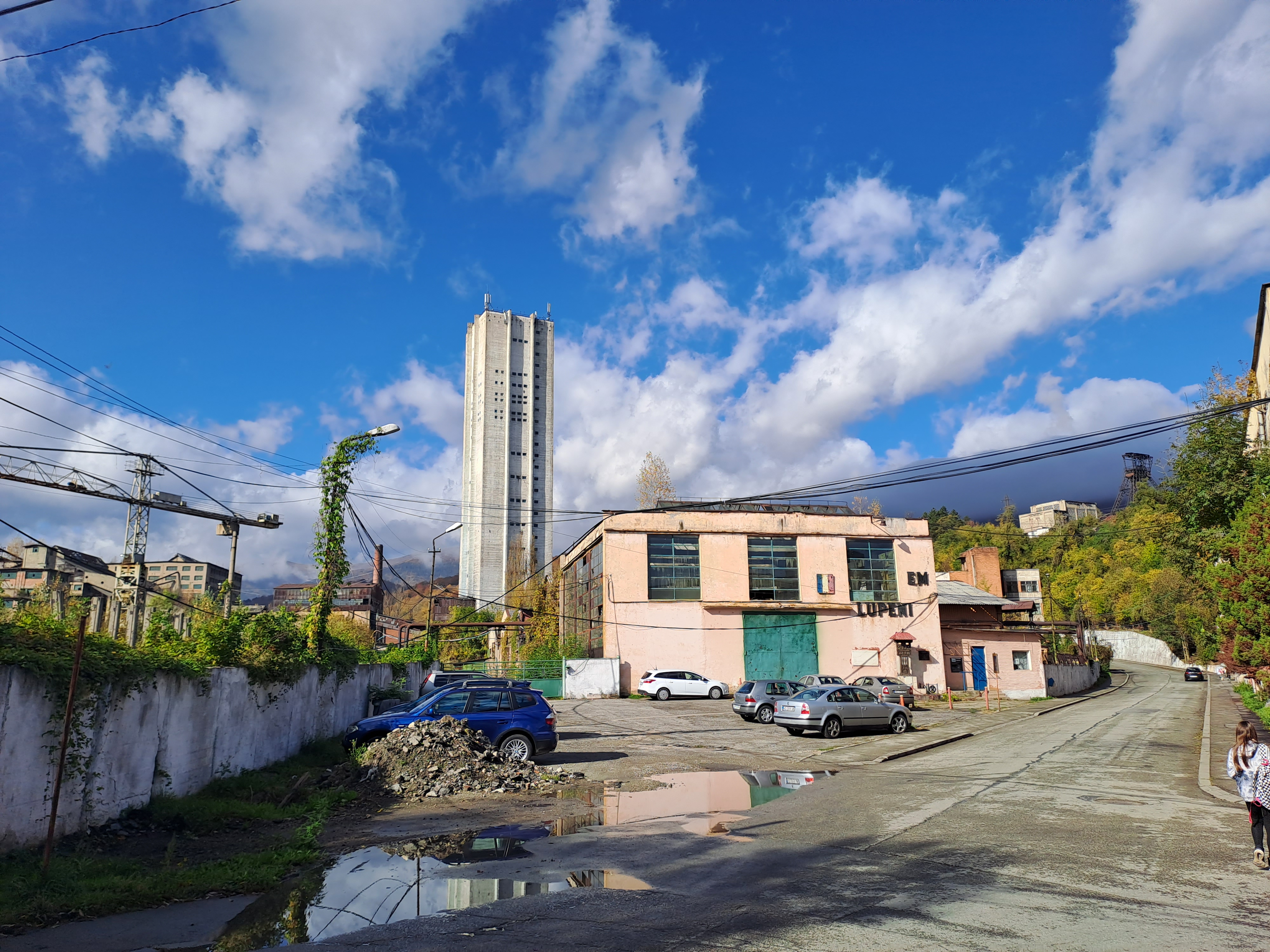
- Location: Lupeni, Hunedoara County, Romania
- Products: Coal
- Production: 765,000 tonnes
- Financial year: 2008
- Opened: 1980
- Company: National Hard Coal Company

Lupeni Coal Mine is an underground mining exploitation, one of the largest in Romania located in Lupeni, one of six cities in the Jiu Valley region of Hunedoara County. The legal entity managing the Lupeni mine is the National Hard Coal Company which was set up in 1998. The mine has reserves of 65 million tonnes of coal.

== See also ==
- Jiu Valley
- 1922 Lupeni mine disaster
- League of Miners Unions of the Jiu Valley
