= Petrila Coal Mine =

Coal mine in Hunedoara County, Romania

Petrila Coal mine
- Location within Romania
- Location: Petrila, Hunedoara County, Romania; 45°26′20.44″N 23°22′35.62″E
- Products: Coal
- Production: 228,000 tonnes
- Financial year: 2008
- Opened: 1980
- Company: National Hard Coal Company

Petrila Coal Mine is an underground mining exploitation, one of the largest in Romania located in Petrila, one of six cities in the Jiu Valley region of Hunedoara County. The legal entity managing the Petrila mine is the National Hard Coal Company which was set up in 1998. The mine has reserves of 16.5 million tonnes of coal.

== See also ==
- Jiu Valley
- League of Miners Unions of the Jiu Valley
