= Vulcan Coal Mine =

Coal mine in Hunedoara County, Romania

Vulcan Coal mine
- Location within Romania
- Location: Vulcan, Hunedoara County, Romania; 45°22′54.52″N 23°18′24.48″E
- Products: Coal
- Production: 325,000 tonnes
- Financial year: 2008
- Opened: 1980
- Company: National Hard Coal Company

Vulcan Coal Mine is an underground mining exploitation, one of the largest in Romania located in Vulcan, one of six cities in the Jiu Valley region of Hunedoara County. The legal entity managing the Vulcan mine is the National Hard Coal Company which was set up in 1998. The mine has reserves of 23.5 million tonnes of coal.

== See also ==
- Jiu Valley
- League of Miners Unions of the Jiu Valley
