= Straja =

Ski resort in Romania

Coordinates: 45.3207°N 23.2369°E

Straja resort is an Eastern European ski and snowboarding resort, situated at an elevation of 1,440 m (4,720 ft) in the Vâlcan Mountains of the Southern Carpathians, in the Jiu Valley region of Hunedoara County, Romania. The resort is a relatively new one, being declared a resort in 2002.

Access to the resort can be made from Lupeni (a small mining town), on a 8 km (5.0 mi) long paved mountain road or by a gondola. The Straja resort has about 26 km (16 mi) of ski area; 20 km are equipped with artificial snow. The 11 cable cars provide access to all the slopes of the resort. There are 12 slopes, each equipped with a cable car. Five of them also benefit from a nocturnal facility, making it possible to use the slopes until late at night. They are maintained with snow-blowing machines to keep them in the best possible conditions for skiing. The snow season here usually starts in the first week of December and ends in the last week of March.

Due to the construction of the gondola and the chairlift on the Straja Peak (1,868 m (6,129 ft)) there are new slopes, the longest being the Straja Strand, with a length of 3.8 km. In season 2016-2017 the chairlift on the Constantinescu Piste had been open, and in the 2017–2018 season, another chair lift had replaced the ski lift number 2.

Since 2001, a brown bear named Baloo has been on display at the ski resort despite a poorly enforced 2005 ban by the Romanian government prohibiting private individuals from owning bears. Baloo, who lives in a small rusty cage without enrichment, is said to be given alcohol to drink along with an insufficient diet. Libearty Bear Sanctuary has been working to rescue Baloo, but the ski resort owner refuses to relinquish the bear to the sanctuary.

== See also ==
- Jiu Valley
- Carpathian Mountains
