= Militaru =

Militaru is a Romanian surname. Notable people with the surname include:

- Alina Militaru (born 1982), Romanian long jumper
- Constantin Militaru (born 1963), Romanian high jumper
- Damian Militaru (born 1967), Romanian footballer and manager
- Gigi Militaru (born 1986), Romanian rugby union player
- Nicolae Militaru (1925–1996), Romanian general

== See also ==
- Georgeta Militaru-Maşca (born 1954), Romanian rower
