= Laurențiu Tudor =

Laurențiu Tudor may refer to:

- Laurențiu Tudor (footballer, born 1976), Romanian football manager and footballer
- Laurențiu Tudor (footballer, born 1997), Romanian footballer
