= 1922 Lupeni mine disaster =

Mine explosion disaster

Coordinates: 45.357181°N 23.211841°E

The 1922 Lupeni mine disaster was a coal mining explosion at the Lupeni Coal Mine district in the Jiu Valley of Greater Romania, on April 27, 1922. A total of 82 miners were killed.

== Accident ==
The U.S. based Associated Press reported the news from Romania three days after the explosion, on April 30, 1922, with the dispatch "Upward of 100 persons were killed today in a mine explosion in the Lupeni district of Transylvania. The bodies of 50 victims were completely carbonized while those of others were blown to pieces."
