= Livezeni Coal Mine =

Coal mine in Hunedoara County, Romania

Livezeni Coal mine
- Location within Romania
- Location: Petroşani, Hunedoara County, Romania; 45°22′59.99″N 23°22′59.99″E
- Products: Coal
- Production: 314,000 tonnes
- Financial year: 2008
- Opened: 1980
- Company: National Hard Coal Company

Livezeni Coal Mine is an underground mining exploitation, one of the largest in Romania located in Petroşani, one of six cities in the Jiu Valley region of Hunedoara County. The legal entity managing the Livezeni mine is the National Hard Coal Company which was set up in 1998. The mine has reserves of 22.6 million tonnes of coal.

== See also ==
- Jiu Valley
- League of Miners Unions of the Jiu Valley
