= Municipiu =

Administrative unit of Romania, corresponding to a major city

Municipii (municipalities) of Romania Municipalities County seat municipalities Bucharest

A municipiu (from Latin municipium; English: municipality) is a level of administrative subdivision in Romania and Moldova, roughly equivalent to city in some English-speaking countries.

In Romania, this status is given to towns that are large and urbanized; at present, there are 103 municipii. There is no clear benchmark regarding the status of municipiu even though it applies to localities which have a sizeable population, usually above 40,000, and extensive urban infrastructure. Localities that do not meet these loose guidelines are classified only as towns (orașe), or if they are not urban areas, as communes (comune). Cities are governed by a mayor and local council. There are no official administrative subdivisions of cities even though, unofficially, municipalities may be divided into quarters/districts (cartiere in Romanian). The exception to this is Bucharest, which has a status similar to that of a county, and is officially subdivided into six administrative sectors.

In Moldova, which has thirteen municipii, a 2002 law provides that the status applies to the cities that play an important role in the country's economic, social, cultural, scientific, political and administrative life.

== Complete list ==
=== Romania ===
County	Cities	Year granted status
Alba	Alba Iulia; Aiud; Blaj; Sebeș	1938/1968; 1994; 1993; 2000
Arad	Arad	1925/1968
Argeș	Pitești; Câmpulung; Curtea de Argeș	1968; 1994; 1995
Bacău	Bacău; Onești; Moinești	1929†/1968; 1968; 2001
Bihor	Oradea; Beiuș; Marghita; Salonta	1925/1968; 2003; 2003; 2001
Bistrița-Năsăud	Bistrița	1979
Botoșani	Botoșani; Dorohoi	1968; 1994
Brașov	Brașov; Făgăraș; Codlea; Săcele	1925/1968; 1979; 2000; 2000
Brăila	Brăila	1925/1968
Buzău	Buzău; Râmnicu Sărat	1968; 1994
Caraș-Severin	Reșița; Caransebeș	1968; 1995
Călărași	Călărași; Oltenița	1968; 1997
Cluj	Cluj-Napoca; Turda; Dej; Câmpia Turzii; Gherla	1925/1968; 1968; 1968; 1998; 2000
Constanța	Constanța; Mangalia; Medgidia	1925/1968; 1995; 1994
Covasna	Sfântu Gheorghe; Târgu Secuiesc	1979; 2000
Dâmbovița	Târgoviște; Moreni	1968; 2003
Dolj	Craiova; Băilești; Calafat	1925/1968; 2001; 1997
Galați	Galați; Tecuci	1925/1968; 1968
Giurgiu	Giurgiu	1933†/1968
Gorj	Târgu Jiu; Motru	1968; 2000
Harghita	Miercurea Ciuc; Gheorgheni; Odorheiu Secuiesc; Toplița	1979; 2003; 1968; 2002
Hunedoara	Deva; Hunedoara; Brad; Lupeni; Orăștie; Petroșani; Vulcan	1968; 1968; 1995; 2003; 1995; 1968; 2003
Ialomița	Slobozia; Fetești; Urziceni	1979; 1995; 1995
Iași	Iași; Pașcani	1925/1968; 1995
Ilfov	none	
Maramureș	Baia Mare; Sighetu Marmației	1968; 1968
Mehedinți	Drobeta-Turnu Severin; Orșova	1933†/1968; 2000
Mureș	Târgu Mureș; Sighișoara; Reghin; Târnăveni	1925†/1968; 1968; 1994; 1998
Neamț	Piatra Neamț; Roman	1968; 1968
Olt	Slatina; Caracal	1979; 1994
Prahova	Ploiești; Câmpina	1925/1968; 1994
Satu Mare	Satu Mare; Carei	1929†/1968; 1995
Sălaj	Zalău	1979
Sibiu	Sibiu; Mediaș	1925/1968; 1968
Suceava	Suceava; Fălticeni; Rădăuți; Câmpulung Moldovenesc; Vatra Dornei	1968; 1994; 1994; 1995; 2000
Teleorman	Alexandria; Roșiorii de Vede; Turnu Măgurele	1979; 1995; 1968
Timiș	Timișoara; Lugoj	1925/1968; 1934†/1968
Tulcea	Tulcea	1968
Vaslui	Vaslui; Bârlad; Huși	1979; 1968; 1995
Vâlcea	Râmnicu Vâlcea; Drăgășani	1968; 1995
Vrancea	Focșani; Adjud	1934†/1968; 2000
Bucharest	Bucharest	1925/1968

† lost status in 1938

Of the seventeen municipii created in 1925, three are no longer in Romania: Cernăuți, Cetatea Albă, and Chișinău. Additionally, Bălți became one in 1929; together with Cetatea Albă, it lost the title in 1938. Cluj and Oradea temporarily lost the title in 1940 as a result of the Second Vienna Award, while it was granted to Odessa and Tiraspol during the Transnistria Governorate period. The status was not used between 1950 and 1968, so that cities which lost it in 1950 were reassigned it in 1968. The most recent municipii were created in 2003.

=== Moldova ===
Cities	Year granted status
Bălți	1995
Cahul	1998/2016
Ceadîr-Lunga	2016
Chișinău	1995
Comrat	1998
Edineț	1998/2016
Hîncești	1998/2016
Orhei	1998/2016
Soroca	1998/2016
Strășeni	2016
Ungheni	1998/2016
Tighina	1995
Tiraspol	1995

Chișinău, Tiraspol, Bălți, and Bender/Tighina have been municipii continuously since 1995, and Comrat since 1998. Cahul, Edineț, Hîncești, Orhei, Soroca, and Ungheni held the status from 1998 to 2002, and regained it in 2016. Additionally, Căușeni, Taraclia, Dubăsari, and Rîbnița held the status from 1998 to 2002.
