= Aninoasa =

- Town
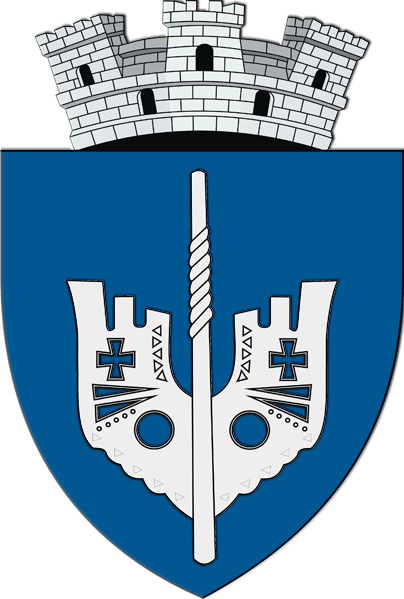
- Coat of arms

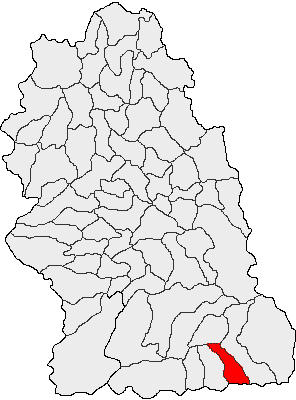
- Location in Hunedoara County

- Location in Romania
- Coordinates: 45°24′40″N 23°18′50″E
- Country: Romania
- County: Hunedoara

Government
  - Mayor (2024–2028): Nicolae Dunca (PSD)
- Area: 33.61 km^{2} (12.98 sq mi)
- Elevation: 624 m (2,047 ft)
- Population (2021-12-01): 3,369
  - Density: 100.2/km^{2} (259.6/sq mi)
- Time zone: UTC+02:00 (EET)
  - Summer (DST): UTC+03:00 (EEST)
- Postal code: 335100
- Area code: (+40) 02 54
- Vehicle reg.: HD
- Website: orasulaninoasa.ro

Historical population
Year	Pop.	±%
1850	500	—
1910	1,523	+204.6%
1930	5,318	+249.2%
1956	6,830	+28.4%
1992	5,552	−18.7%
2002	5,106	−8.0%
2011	4,360	−14.6%
2021	3,369	−22.7%
Source: Census data

Aninoasa (Hungarian: Aninósza or Aninószabányatelep) is a town in Hunedoara County in the Transylvania region of Romania. The town is located in the Jiu Valley, which is a coal basin, and many of the towns residents are coal miners. Aninoasa administers one village, Iscroni (Alsóbarbatyeniszkrony). It officially became a town in 1989, as a result of the Romanian rural systematization program.

== Geography ==
The town is situated near the confluence of both headwater rivers (Jiul de Vest and Jiul de Est) of the Jiu, north of the Vâlcan Mountains and in the eastern foothills of the Retezat Mountains. Most of the town was built along Aninoasa creek, and the town is actually separated into two areas by the Jiul de Vest. "Anin" means "alder tree" in Romanian.

Aninoasa is located at the southern extremity of Hunedoara County, about 98 km (61 mi) from the county seat, Deva, on the border with Gorj County. The village of Iscroni is crossed by national road DN66A, which leads west to Vulcan, 5 km (3.1 mi) away, and Lupeni, 11 km (6.8 mi) away, and east to European route E79 and the city of Petroșani, 7 km (4.3 mi) to the northeast.

The Iscroni train station serves the CFR Line 214, a 17 km (11 mi) railway from Livezeni (in Petroșani) to Lupeni.

== History ==
Aninoasa is the oldest town in Hunedoara County, being mentioned as far back as 1453 AD.

== Demographics ==
At the 2011 census, Aninoasa had 4,360 inhabitants, of which 88.18% were Romanians, 7.1% Roma, and 4.18% Hungarians. At the 2021 census, the town had a population of 3,369; of those, 83.85% were Romanians, 2.4% Roma, and 1.6% Hungarians.

== Natives ==
- Nicolae Guță (born 1967), musician
- Ștefania Stănilă (born 1997), artistic gymnast
- Andrei Stocker (1942–2025), footballer

== See also ==
- Aninoasa coal mine
