= Laurențiu Tudor (footballer, born 1997) =

Romanian footballer

Personal information
- Date of birth: 17 August 1997 (age 29)
- Place of birth: Lupeni, Romania
- Position: Midfielder

Team information
- Current team: Pandurii Târgu Jiu
- Number: 21

Youth career
- Pandurii Târgu Jiu

Senior career*
Years	Team	Apps	(Gls)
2015–2016	Pandurii II Târgu Jiu	?	(?)
2016–2017	Pandurii Târgu Jiu	1	(0)
2017–2019	Metalurgistul Cugir		
2017–2018	→ Ripensia Timișoara (loan)	26	(1)
2019–	Pandurii Târgu Jiu	4	(0)
- * Club domestic league appearances and goals as of 1 June 2019

Laurențiu Tudor (born 17 August 1997) is a Romanian professional footballer who plays as a midfielder for Pandurii Târgu Jiu.
