= Gigi Militaru =

Romania international rugby union player

- Born: Gigi Militaru; 8 February 1986 (age 40) Lupeni, Hunedoara County, Romania
- Height: 5 ft 11.3 in (1.81 m)
- Weight: 18 st 5.9 lb (117.0 kg)

Rugby union career
- Position: Prop
Senior career
Years	Team	Apps	(Points)
2012–13	București Wolves	1	(0)
- Correct as of 11 June 2016
Provincial / State sides
Years	Team	Apps	(Points)
2013–	Timișoara Saracens	38	(0)
- Correct as of 11 June 2016
International career
Years	Team	Apps	(Points)
2016–	Romania	1	(0)
- Correct as of 11 June 2016

Gigi Militaru (born 8 February 1986, in Lupeni, Transylvania) is a Romanian rugby union footballer. He plays the position of Prop and is currently playing for RC Timișoara in the Romanian Rugby Championship. He formed as a player at Știința Petroșani rugby club, and also played for the team until he moved to RC Timișoara in 2012.
