= Vulcan, Hunedoara =

Vulcan
- Municipality
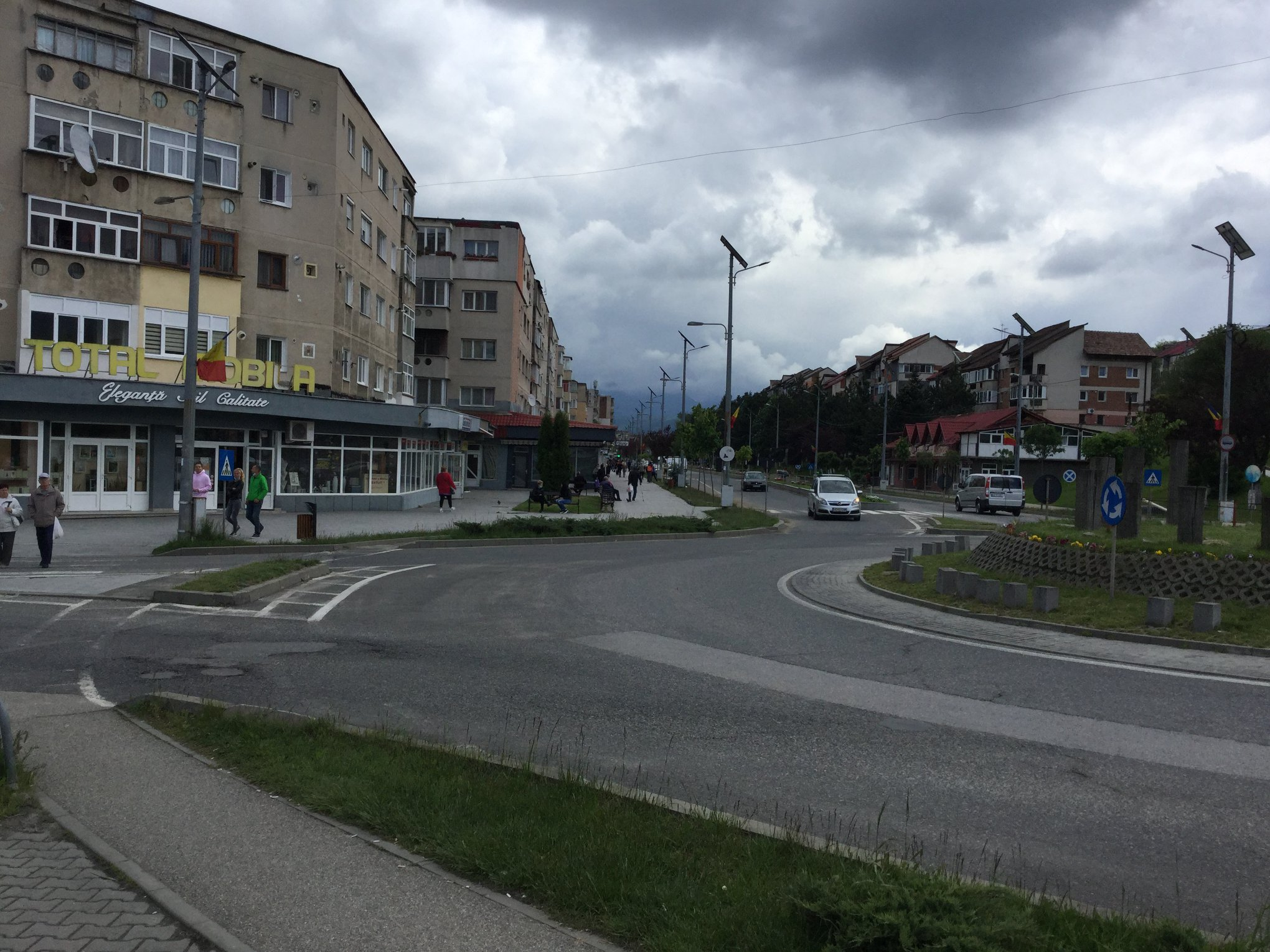
- Mihai Viteazul Boulevard, the main street in Vulcan

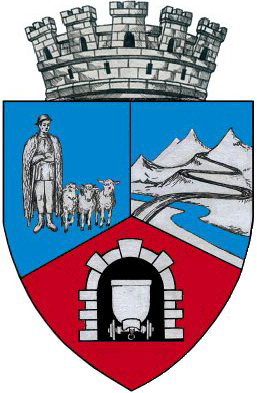
- Coat of arms

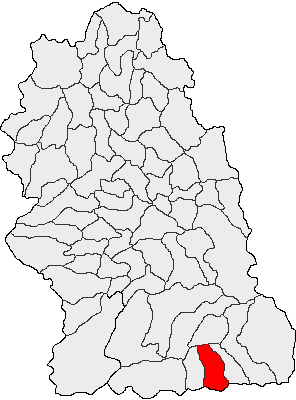
- Location in Hunedoara County

- Location in Romania
- Coordinates: 45°22′52″N 23°17′29″E
- Country: Romania
- County: Hunedoara

Government
  - Mayor (2024–2028): Cristian-Ion Merișanu (PSD)
- Area: 87.31 km^{2} (33.71 sq mi)
- Elevation: 603 m (1,978 ft)
- Population (2021-12-01): 19,772
  - Density: 226.5/km^{2} (586.5/sq mi)
- Time zone: UTC+02:00 (EET)
  - Summer (DST): UTC+03:00 (EEST)
- Postal code: 336200
- Area code: (+40) 02 54
- Vehicle reg.: HD
- Website: www.e-vulcan.ro

Vulcan (Romanian pronunciation: [vulˈkan]; formerly Jiu-Vaidei-Vulcan; Hungarian: Vulkán, Zsilyvajdejvulkán (Zsily-Vajdej-Vulkán); German: Wolkendorf, Wulkan) is a city in Hunedoara County, Transylvania, Romania. With a population of 19,772 as of 2021, it is the second-largest city in the Jiu Valley. It administers two villages, Dealul Babii ("Old Woman's Hill" in Romanian; Hegyvulkán) and Jiu-Paroșeni (Zsilymacesdparoseny).

== Name ==
The city is named after the Vulcan Pass that connects the Jiu Valley to Oltenia, itself being derived from Slavic "vlk", meaning "wolf" (even if "vulcan" means "volcano" in Romanian).

== Geography ==
Vulcan is located at the southern extremity of Hunedoara County, about 100 km (62 mi) from the county seat, Deva, on the border with Gorj County. It is situated in a hilly area north of the Vâlcan Mountains, on the banks of the Jiul de Vest and its tributaries, the rivers Merișoara and Crevedia.

The city is crossed by national road DN66A, which connects it to nearby Aninoasa and to Petroșani, 11 km (6.8 mi) to the northeast, and to Lupeni, 7 km (4.3 mi) to the west. County road DJ664 leads to the Vulcan Pass, 8 kilometres (5 mi) to the south, and on to Schela, Gorj, while county road DJ666 leads north to Dealul Babii village and Bănița commune.

The Vulcan train station serves the CFR Line 214, a 17 km (11 mi) railway from Livezeni (in Petroșani) to Lupeni.

== History ==
The coal resources of the region were discovered in 1788 while the Austrian General Landau defended Vulcan from the Ottoman Turks. One night the soldiers could not put out the camp fire they made, as the piles of coal underneath had caught fire. General Landau thought that he could stop the Turks without a fight by setting piles of coal on fire. The Turks noted the large numbers of fires on the heights and thought that the Austrian army was much larger than theirs and retreated.

In 1850, the first mine was set up by the Hoffman brothers of Brașov.

== Demographics ==
Historical population
Year	Pop.	±%
1956	14,859	—
1966	21,979	+47.9%
1977	28,664	+30.4%
1992	34,524	+20.4%
2002	33,186	−3.9%
2011	24,160	−27.2%
2021	19,772	−18.2%
Source: Census data

At the 2021 census, Vulcan had a population of 19,772. This marked a decrease of 18.2% from the 2011 census, when the city had 24,160 inhabitants; of those, 92.91% were Romanians, 5.13% Hungarians, 1.41% Romani, and 0.2% Germans.

== People ==
- Pius Brânzeu (1911–2002), doctor and member of the Romanian Academy
- Ernő Csíki (1875–1954), Hungarian entomologist
- Andrej Prean Nagy (1923–1997), Hungarian footballer
- Ștefan Onisie (1925–1984), footballer and manager
- Leonard Wolf (1923–2019), Romanian-American author

== Sports ==
The local football team is CSM Vulcan, currently playing in Liga IV Hunedoara. Its home ground is Stadionul Central.

== Twin cities ==
List of Vulcan's sister and twin cities:

- Bor, Serbia

== See also ==
- Jiu Valley
- Vulcan Pass
- CS Vulcan
