= Jiu Valley =

Romanian coal mining region

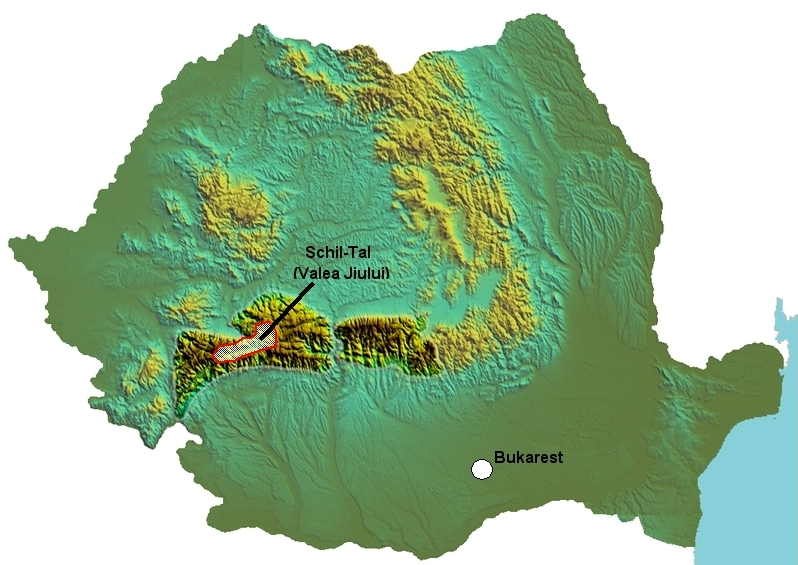
Jiu Valley on the map of Romania

The Jiu Valley (Romanian: Valea Jiului pronounced [ˈvale̯a ˈʒi.uluj], Hungarian: Zsil-völgy [ˈʒil ˈvølɟ]) is a region in southwestern Transylvania, Romania, in Hunedoara county, situated in a valley of the Jiu River between the Retezat Mountains and the Parâng Mountains. The region was heavily industrialised and the main activity was coal mining, but due to low efficiency, most of the mines were closed down in the years following the collapse of Communism in Romania. For a long time the place was called Romania's biggest coalfield.

== History ==
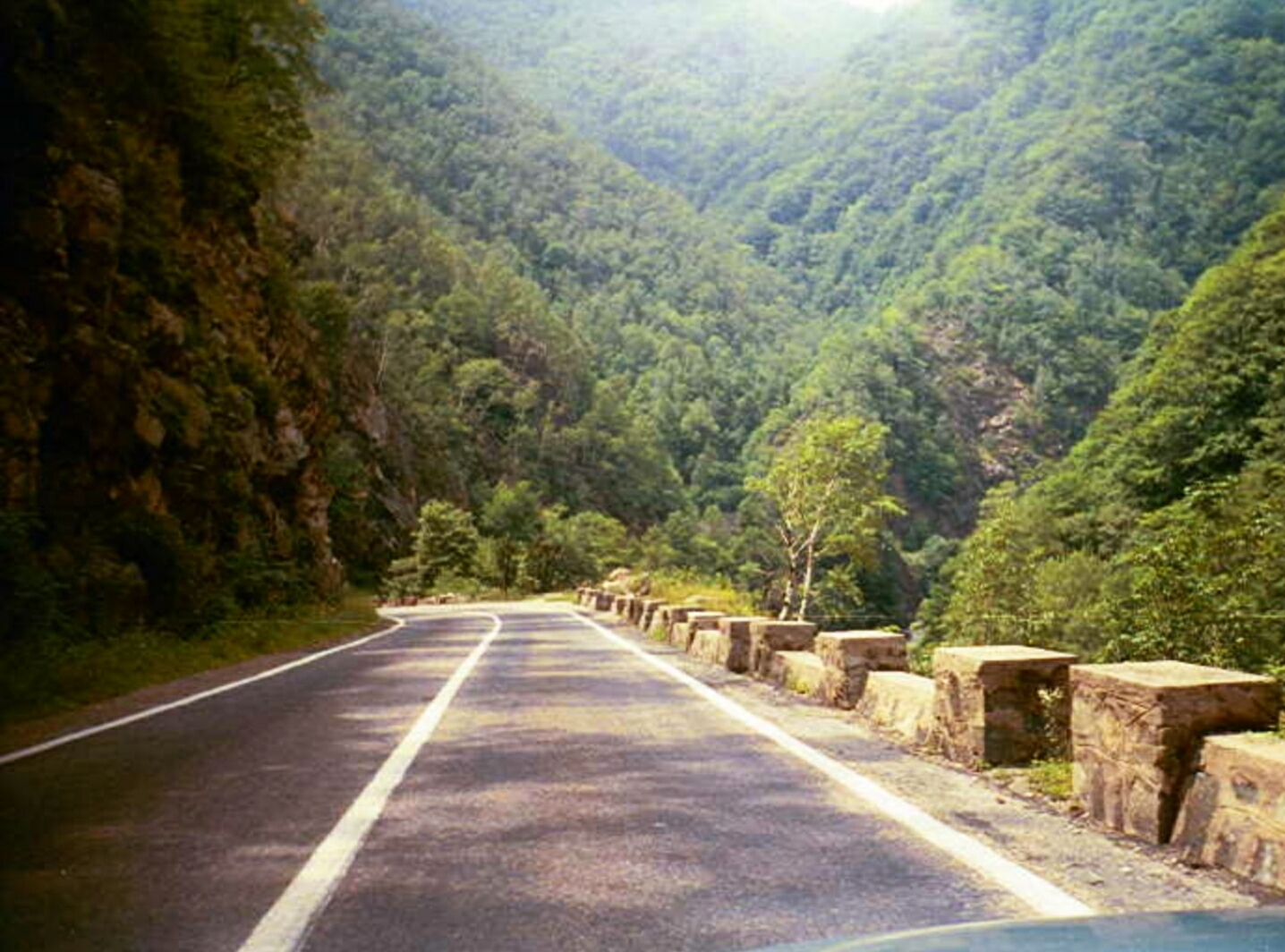
Jiu Valley scenery

=== Before the 19th century ===
The region was populated since ancient times, being part of Dacia. During the Middle Ages, the inhabitants of the Jiu Valley lived in huts spread along the mountains, and often near the river, and the main activity was shepherding. Until the early 19th century the region remained sparsely populated due to its geographical isolation (being surrounded by mountains).

=== 19th century and early 20th century ===
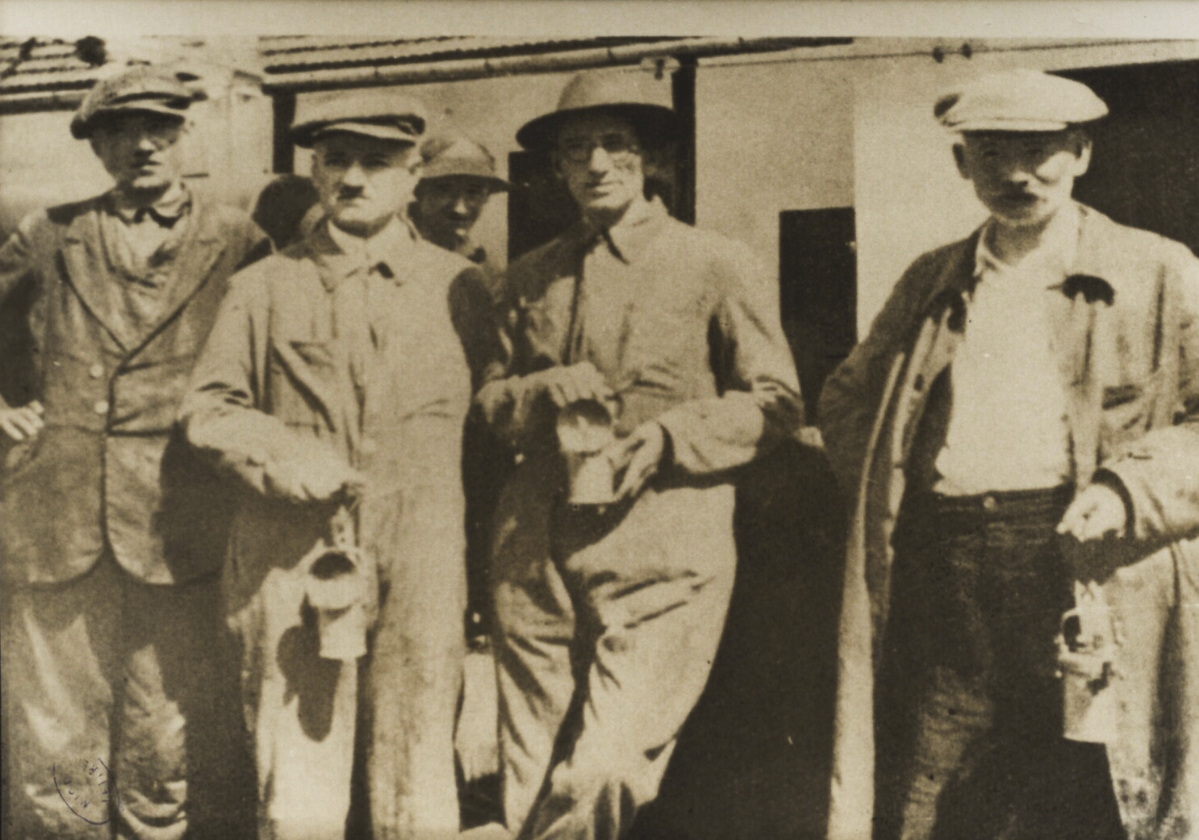
Writer Panait Istrati (second from the right) with coal miners of Lupeni, during the 1929 protests

The development of coal mining started in the Jiu Valley about 160 years ago, around the middle of the 19th century, when Hungarian, German, Czech and Polish workers were brought from all parts of the Habsburg Empire to work in the coal mines. Romanian miners from other regions, such as Baia Mare or the Apuseni Mountains, were also brought to work in the Jiu Valley. During the late 19th century, the region started to strongly develop itself, economically and culturally, through a flourishing industry based on mining. The Jiu Valley, being situated in Transylvania, was part of the Austro-Hungarian Empire until the 1918 Union of Transylvania with Romania. During World War I, the area was the site of heavy fighting between Romanian forces on one side and German and Austro-Hungarian forces on the other side. The first battle ended in an important, albeit temporary defensive victory for the Romanians, nevertheless the Central Powers succeeded to break through the Romanian defences here in November 1916. Mining continued to dominate the economy in the 20th century, but the region also experienced social unrest, notably the Lupeni Strike of 1929. The mines were privately owned until 1948, when all private companies were nationalized by the Communist government.

=== The Jiu Valley during the Communist regime ===
As part of Romania's reparations to the Soviet Union for its wartime alliance with Germany, the Romanian coal mines were nationalized and converted into joint Soviet-Romanian companies (SovRoms). These Sovroms continued for about ten years. The Jiu Valley expanded rapidly in the second half of the 20th century as the country's communist rulers (Petru Groza 1945–1952, Gheorghe Gheorghiu-Dej 1952–1965, and Nicolae Ceaușescu 1965–1989) embarked on an intensive industrial growth program fueled by coal combustion. Steel production rose from 280,000 tons in 1938 to 13,790,000 tons in 1985. Steel production was fueled by coke, distilled carbon made from metallurgical coal. As coke was generated, it gave off coal tar as a by-product that was then used in manufacturing many other products. To meet the labor requirement for this demand, the communist government imported tens of thousands of miners from around the country, mainly from Moldavia. By 1979 the number of miners reached 179,000.

During the 1970s and 1980s Ceaușescu determined that Romania should be completely debt-free and sought to repay its foreign debt ahead of the repayment schedule agreed to by the country's creditors. To accomplish this, he exported for sale any products or materials of value, while the little inferior food and products remained was sold on the domestic market. Opposition was ruthlessly crushed and expressions of discontent were stifled by the ubiquitous Securitate, the secret police. As a result, in order to survive, more and more people began to transact business through barter trade and other informal economic means. achieved his goal, but at a huge cost to nearly all sectors of the country. Since the anti-Ceaușescu revolution in 1989, restructuring of the coal sector, the country's economic contraction, and a shift toward natural gas all contributed to a significant decrease in both production and consumption of coal in Romania. Production declined by 57%, from 66.4 million short tons (Mmst) in 1989 to 28.6 Mmst in 1998. Consumption also fell more than 60%, from 77.7 Mmst in 1989 to 30.8 Mmst in 1998.

During this same period the Jiu Valley has been profoundly influenced by lack of re-investment, deteriorating infrastructure, mine closures and massive layoffs, environmental degradation, and political and cultural isolation from the rest of Romania.

=== Organized labor in Romania ===
Organized labor has played an important role in post-revolution Romania, affecting the actions of every government since 1989. Chronic work stoppages and economic disruptions by various labor organizations helped bring down successive governments and contributed to general economic and political instability. While trade unions have existed in Romania since the late nineteenth century, during the communist period from World War II until 1989 independent trade unions were not allowed to exist. Instead, there was a national pyramid of industry federations consisting of enterprise trade unions and headed by the General Union of Romanian Trade Unions. The few attempts during this period to found independent trade unions or organize worker protests were ruthlessly suppressed, with their leaders severely punished or executed. Following the chaos of December 1989, trade organizations sprang up virtually overnight. Unlike in Western Europe where trade-union pluralism typically reflects ideological groupings, in Romania labor movement fragmentation reflected distrust of higher authority, personal ambition and unwillingness of leaders to reduce or share power. As of 1997, labor analysts estimated that there were over 14,000 enterprise trade union organizations, 150 federations, and 18 confederations, representing approximately two-thirds of the workforce. Some consolidation occurred in the 1990s.

=== Jiu Valley Coal Miners Union ===
Few, if any, Romanian trade unions, though, have had as much influence or won as much national notoriety (or international attention) as the Liga Sindicatelor Miniere din Valea Jiului (League of Miners Unions of the Jiu Valley, or Jiu Valley Coal Miners Union). While there are two other coal mining regions (primarily surface mining) in Romania, and other miners unions, the Jiu Valley Coal Miners Union has long been the most independent and militant.

Political and social unrest in this region is nothing new. To this day miners commemorate the Lupeni Strike of 1929 (when the army killed 23 workers and wounded at least 53), the big strikes of February 1933, and the miners’ protest in 1977 during the Ceaușescu years. On the latter occasion, on 1 August 1977, 35,000 Jiu miners gathered in the main yard of the Lupeni mine to protest against a new decree that raised the age of retirement from 50 to 55 and reduced the miners’ pensions. Spokesmen for the miners claimed that the protest was the culmination of many years of deteriorating conditions and the intolerable political situation in the country. Ceaușescu dealt with the miners by agreeing to their demands and then, as soon as the movement subsided, ordered reprisals against the leaders. He also transferred four thousand of them out of the area and replaced them, many of the replacements working as informants for the Securitate, the dreaded secret police. The subsequent climate of fear kept the miners silent until the 1989 revolution.

=== The 1990s: the rise and decline of miners' unions ===
During the 1990s the Jiu Valley miners have played a visible role in Romanian politics. In fact, Romanians have a name – mineriada (mineriad) – for the periodic eruptions of violence when Jiu Valley miners went on strike and descended upon Bucharest. The first post-revolution action came in 1990. In May 1990, former communist official Ion Iliescu won the presidential election with a majority of over 80% (President from 1990–1996, re-elected December 2000). Some groups, dissatisfied with results, continued street demonstrations in Bucharest, after most of the participants in the electoral meetings before the election had renounced the sit in. Several weeks after the elections, when the authorities attempted to evict the remaining protesters occupying one of Bucharest's central square, violence erupted and, as the police and gendarmerie retreated under pressure, protesters attacked several state institutions, including the police headquarters, the national television station, and the Foreign Ministry.

When the police failed to contain the crowds in University Square, President Iliescu issued a call to arms to Romania's population to prevent further attacks on the newly elected authorities. Among those who responded to the call from organizers were coal miners from the Jiu Valley, who accepted the government offered transport to go to Bucharest to confront the demonstrators. An estimated 10,000 miners were transported to the capital in special trains.

State television broadcast videos of workers attacking and fighting with protesters, including students, as well as the opposition party headquarters. The miners claim that the agitation and most of the brutality was the work of Iliescu's government agents who had infiltrated and disguised themselves as miners (see the June 1990 Mineriad), and there were widespread rumors and suspicion that the Serviciul Român de Informații (the successor to the Securitate) was involved or behind the events with the miners.

Later parliamentary inquiries showed that members of the government intelligence services were involved in the instigation and manipulation of both the protesters and the miners, and that the miners had been "joined by vigilantes who were later credibly identified as former officers of the Securitate." For two days, the miners (aided and abetted by the former Securitate members) violently confronted the protesters and other targets. Despite denials by the secret service, in February 1994 a Bucharest court "found two security officers, Colonel Ion. Nicolae and warrant officer Corneliu Dumitrescu, guilty of ransacking the house of Ion Rațiu, a leading figure in the National Peasant Christian Democratic Party, during the miners’ incursion, and stealing $100,000." Petre Roman's government fell in late September 1991, when the miners returned to Bucharest to demand higher salaries. A technocrat, Theodor Stolojan, was appointed to head an interim government until new elections could be held.

The 1990 mineriad was followed by several other actions during Iliescu's presidency. In September 1991, the miners, irritated that the government had not lived up to its economic promises, descended on Bucharest again. An estimated 10,000 miners came to the capital. Rioting ensued and lasted over four days. The actions during this time led to the resignation and replacement of the prime minister and his cabinet. August 1993 saw another miner strike and a resumption of general strikes by other trade unions. In November 1996, many miners, fed up with what they saw as a betrayal on the part of Iliescu, voted for his opponent, Emil Constantinescu, during the parliamentary and presidential elections.

The economic situation for state-favored working classes, such as the miners, who had been relatively insulated against the harsh privation suffered by the general populace, changed after 1989. During Ceausescu's regime the mines and other ineffective state-owned industries were artificially propped up and protected against market fluctuations. Miners were considered relatively well paid, although there was little of value to purchase with the money they earned. After the revolution in December 1989 the replacement government maintained Ceausescu's policy of subsidizing these money-losing industries with few changes to the industrial or management practices that had led to the problems in the first place. The government borrowed heavily without adhering to the conditions of economic reforms required by the World Bank, the IMF and other international lenders. With Ceausescu's forced privations lifted, and falling prices for Romanian exports, the country's international debt soared. This in turn led to fewer funds allocated to industry reinvestment and maintenance.

Relations between labor and the new Constantinescu government, while appearing initially quite promising, proved as difficult and problematic as before. Under pressure from international lenders (most notably the International Monetary Fund), who refused to provide any more financial assistance unless inefficient and money-losing state owned operations were reduced and other reforms carried out, in February 1997 the new center right coalition embarked on a comprehensive macroeconomic stabilization and radical structural reform program. This program was also seen as a key requirement for attaining the government's goal of membership in NATO and the European Union (EU).

The Constantinescu and Vasile (who succeeded Victor Ciorbea as Prime Minister) government's urgent priority was to reduce budget and trade deficits by making major budget cuts (particularly in social spending), and eliminating non-profitable sectors, including the mines. Decreased mine yields (in no small part due to lack of operating capital and access to technology) and a low international price of and demand for Romanian coal all contributed toward the huge losses in the mining industry being incurred by the government. By some estimates, national demand for coal fell from 44 million tons in 1996 to 33.5 million in 1997, out of a potential annual capacity of 52 million tons.

=== Velvet restructuring and subsequent unrest ===
Under the initial Constantinescu first prime minister and cabinet, the government executed what was referred to in the government and media as a “velvet restructuring” of the mining sector under Ordinance 22. In the process of the “velvet restructuring” 18,000 miners lost their jobs, with the rest left with uncertain futures. The government had promised the miners 15 to 20 months of salary as severance (totaling nearly 20-30 million lei, or $1,230-1,846, according to the August 1999 exchange rate) to help them start their own businesses. Many of the miners, noting the growing number of terminations, did not hesitate to put their names on the lay-off list. However, a year after the beginning of the mining sector restructuring, only approximately 5,000 of the 18,000 had employment, either through starting their own jobs or finding other jobs (and most of these with the companies overseeing the mine closures).

Each mine closure is widely felt in the Jiu Valley community. In Campul lui Neag, the westernmost mine in Jiu Valley, after Ordinance 22 only 152 people remained of the 790 who used to work there before 1966. At Dâlja, a mine in the east of the Jiu Valley there were only 1,023 miners left of the former 3,000. In Lupeni, reputed the second largest mine in Europe and, unlike some of the other Jiu Valley mines, a relatively profitable one, by 1999 only 4,000 workers remained of the pre-1996 8,000 workers. Of these 4,000 only an estimated one-third were actual miners, with the remaining two-thirds aboveground jobs such as administrative, engineering, and technical staff.

The government's actions, while winning concessions with the international lenders, led to growing antagonism with labor. By August 1997 the growing criticism of labor throughout the country translated into strikes and eventually led to the resignation and replacement of the prime minister and cabinet. In the Jiu Valley government's announcement in 1997 of the closures of the Dâlja and Barbateni mines and the generally deteriorating conditions of the miners sparked riots and then led to a general strike.

Despite the probable and most likely reaction of the miners, in order to be eligible for an IMF loan to repay its debts the government was required to close more mines (142 which had been closed since 1997) and was pending decision on closing additional 112 mines. To limit losses in the unprofitable mining sector, then running at $370 million, the government made an announcement just before Christmas 1998 of its plan to close non-profitable mines. After closing about 100 mines and getting rid of 90,000 mining jobs in the course of 1997, including 20,000 in the Jiu Valley, implementing this new plan would result in firing additional 6,500 miners.

The result was an outpouring of miner resentment and anger at what the miners saw as another betrayal. Organized by union leader Miron Cozma, on 20 January 1999 an estimated 10-15,000 set out on another mineriad from the Jiu Valley to Bucharest to force the government to change its policy, demand wage increases and re-opening of recently closed mines.

Along the way the caravan of miners fought pitched and bloody, tear-gas choked battles with the Gendarmerie and wreaked havoc along the way. The army was mobilized and waited on the outskirts of Bucharest. The anticipated and dreaded showdown between the miners and army, however, never materialized. The miners had not reached Bucharest when a secret compromise was reached between union leader Cozma and Prime Minister Radu Vasile on 22 January. In return for the miners’ agreement to turn around and go back to the Jiu Valley, the government agreed to a 30 percent pay rise, re-opening of two previously closed mines, and the spending of hundreds of millions of European Union development funds on projects in the Jiu Valley. Some analysts conclude that the agreement may well have averted an eruption by disaffected workers in other industries.

To many the compromise agreement was seen as a Pyrrhic victory for both sides. While the government avoided a showdown with the miners, the compromise represented “a potentially devastating setback to the government’s flagging efforts to push through market-oriented reforms – including the closure of 140 loss-making coalmines, 49 loss-making state enterprises and a five-year plan to restructure the steel industry with the loss of 70,000 jobs.” As for the miners the future was no more certain than it was before the strike.

The agreement made Cozma a hero in the Jiu Valley, but within a month of his return he was arrested and put in prison as a result of a decision of the Supreme Court of Justice, an action seen by most miners as political revenge by the government. For his role in the 1991 mineriad Cozma had been convicted and sentenced to prison for three years, of which he had served eighteen months before being released in 1998. After the January mineriad, despite his apparent agreement with the government Cozma continued to press for new concessions and announced another strike. In its decision the Supreme Court increased Cozma's sentence to 18 years for “undermining state power” in the 1991 mineriad, along with the charge of illegal possession of a firearm. Cozma defied the government to arrest him and led another march towards Bucharest, but soon thereafter, although protected by a convoy of several thousand miners, Cozma and over 500 miners were arrested in a bloody clash with the police special forces at the Olt River crossing near Stoenești. Several weeks later, already imprisoned, Cozma was convicted on two other unrelated charges.

In December 2000, the electorate, which had seen the country's economic and social situation continue to degenerate under the Constantinescu government, overwhelmingly rejected the “centrists”. After the first election round saw a fragmented right lose on all fronts, the electorate came to choose between Iliescu and the extremist Corneliu Vadim Tudor in the runoff, securing Iliescu's victory.

=== Effects of mine closings ===
To mitigate the effects of the mine closures, in 1999 the government announced several measures to assist the economically depressed Jiu Valley. These measures included: 1) designating the Jiu Valley as a disadvantaged area, a status under which companies investing in the area would benefit from certain tax breaks; 2) construction on the Campul lui Neag-Baile Herculane road (begun August 15, 1999); and 3) the National Tourism Authority designating the Jiu Valley as a tourist area in order to provide jobs for some of the laid-off workers. In addition, the World Bank designated $12 million to fund a social mitigation plan. Most miners, however, continue to see no tangible assistance or implementation of job creation or new skills training. As such, government pronouncements are skeptically seen as mere lip service of politicians attempting to placate the electorate and prevent more miner unrest. The money was inadequate, they say, the development and implementation of laws and programs set up too late, and no infrastructure was ever established to support the development of new industries like tourism.

Within the Jiu Valley opinions and rumors abound as to what the future potentially holds. Many miners feel that coal mining in Romania is a moribund industry that will never regain its position of significance. Some still hope that the industry will experience resurgence and point to the example of the Hungarian government, which, after closing their mines under international pressure, was compelled by the powerful reaction of the miners to reopen them.

Miners salaries, estimated at $400–500/month as of January 2006, are considerably higher than the average in Jiu Valley which lag far behind the national average income. Miners who have been laid off by the mines are to receive a severance pay, but often saw this eaten away by the hyperinflation in the late 1990s, only brought under control in the past several years (2006). During the first redundancies, what little income in lei was not spent immediately for basic necessities was typically not deposited in banks (which were seen as unreliable) but was exchanged for U.S. dollars or Deutschmarks and hidden in their homes. By 2000 this had begun to change as the Romanian banks became more efficient and competitive, and as public confidence began to grow, so did deposits.

With the redundancy pay-offs, some of the miners expressed interests in starting their own businesses and see the Jiu Valley develop a tourist industry, but the impediments to both are painfully obvious and everywhere. The original redundancy payments, estimated at a total maximum of 100% of 12 month salaries (paid upfront), plus an additional 50-60% of monthly salary paid over the next 18 months, was hardly enough to buy inventory or start a business, particularly when adding in the cost of dealing with bureaucracy and corruption. Before 2000, if the money was not invested with a high enough return, the high Romanian inflation soon ate the savings away. Furthermore, while many residents looked to the development of tourism as a substitute industry, this possibility seemed limited by the lack of a service economy infrastructure, with such basics as adequate accommodation, roads, transport, equipment rentals, tourist information, programs, medical facilities, banks, and other basic business services.

== Description ==

Geographically, the area is located in the south of the region of Transylvania, along the Jiu river basin, and it is surrounded by mountains. The Jiu Valley is Romania's principal coal mining region. Two other areas in Romania have some surface mining, while the Jiu Valley contains deep shaft underground mines. While providing only 12% of the Romania's supply of coal, the Jiu Valley is the only region in Romania both completely urbanized and with a history of being largely reliant on a single industry. Coal mining has long been the heart and economic lifeline for the Jiu Valley, but this activity has decreased since the 1990s, when many mines were closed. Currently, the Jiu Valley is one of the poorest areas in Romania.

== Cities and towns ==
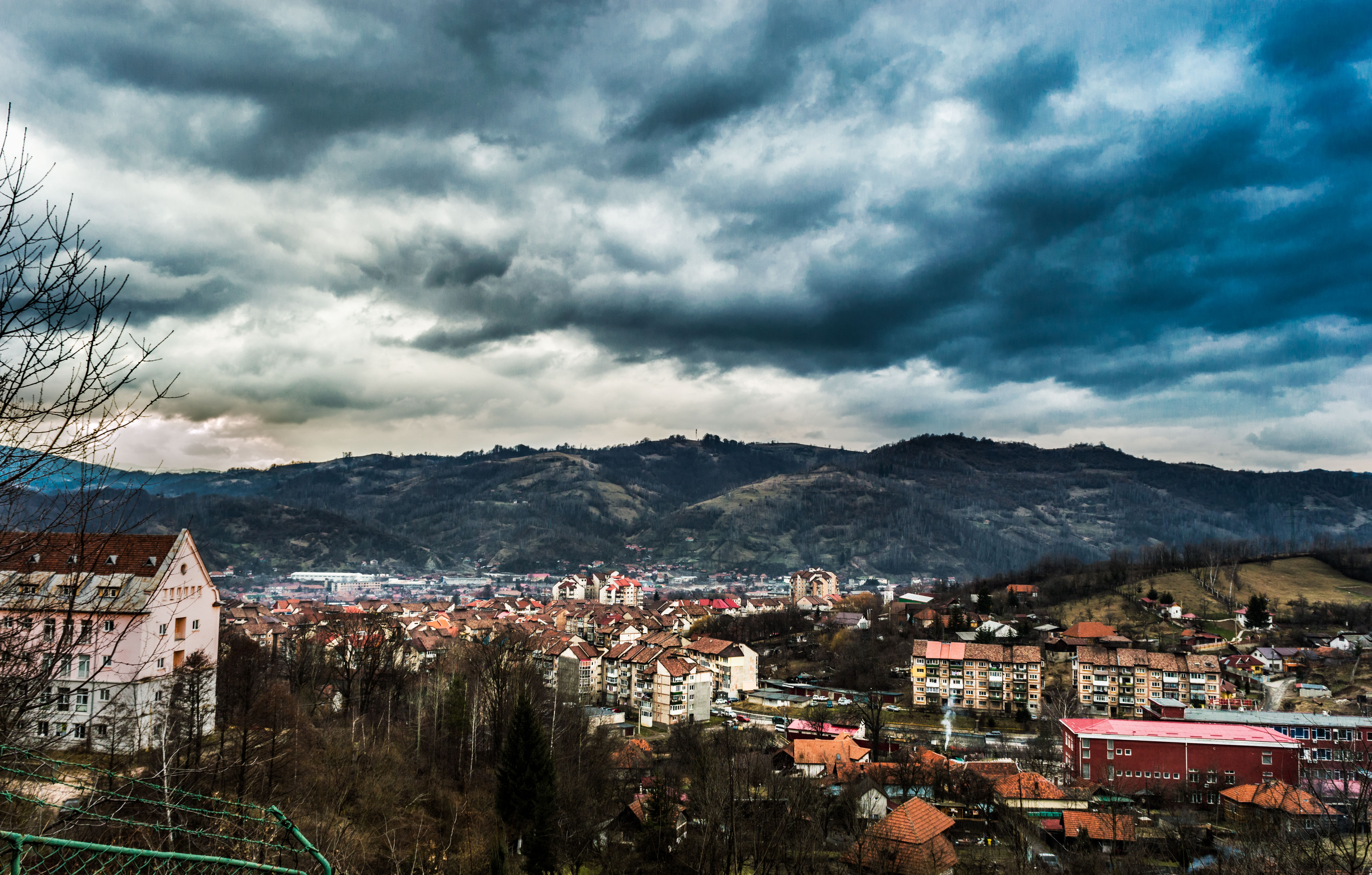
Petroșani

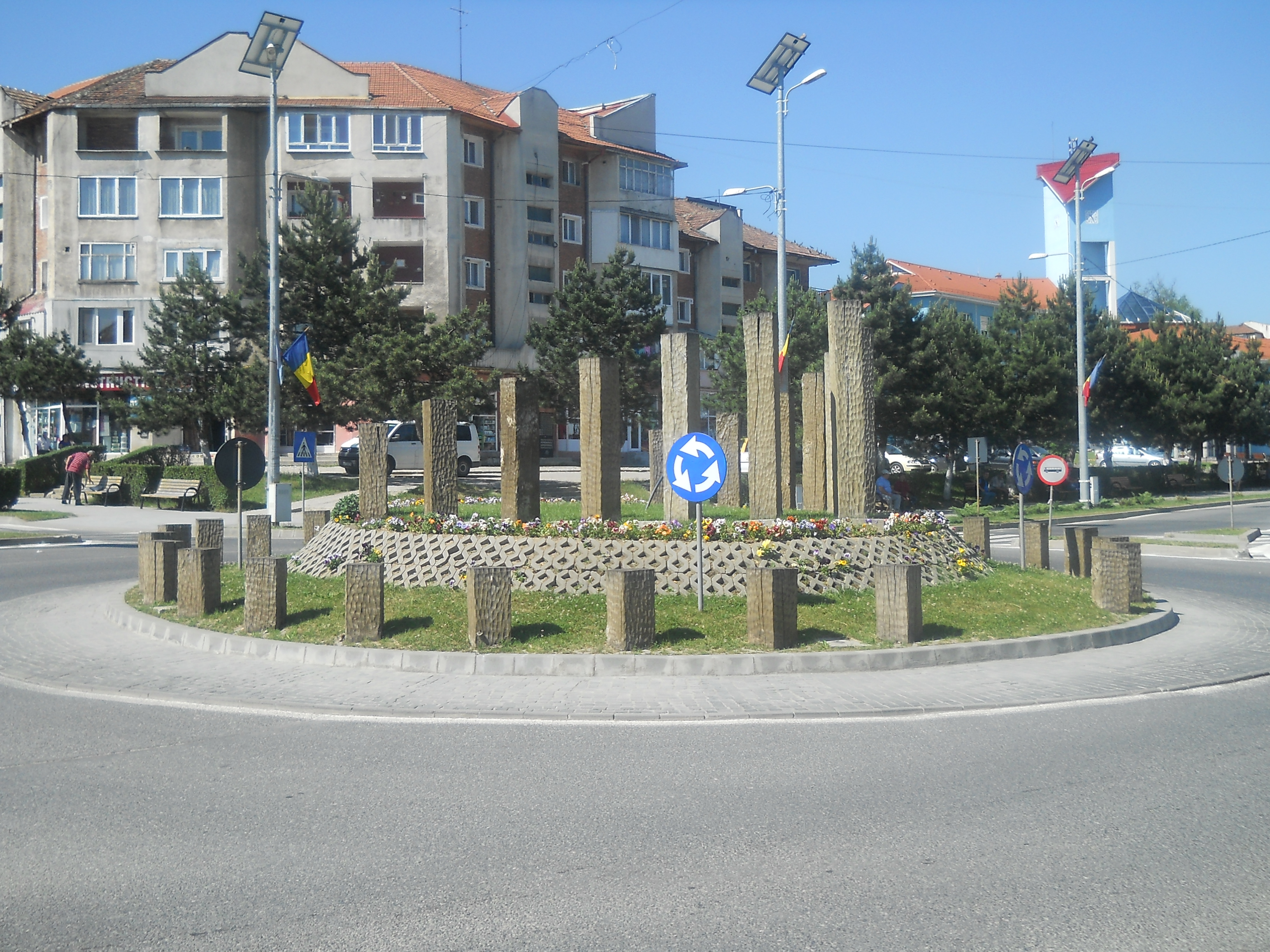
Vulcan

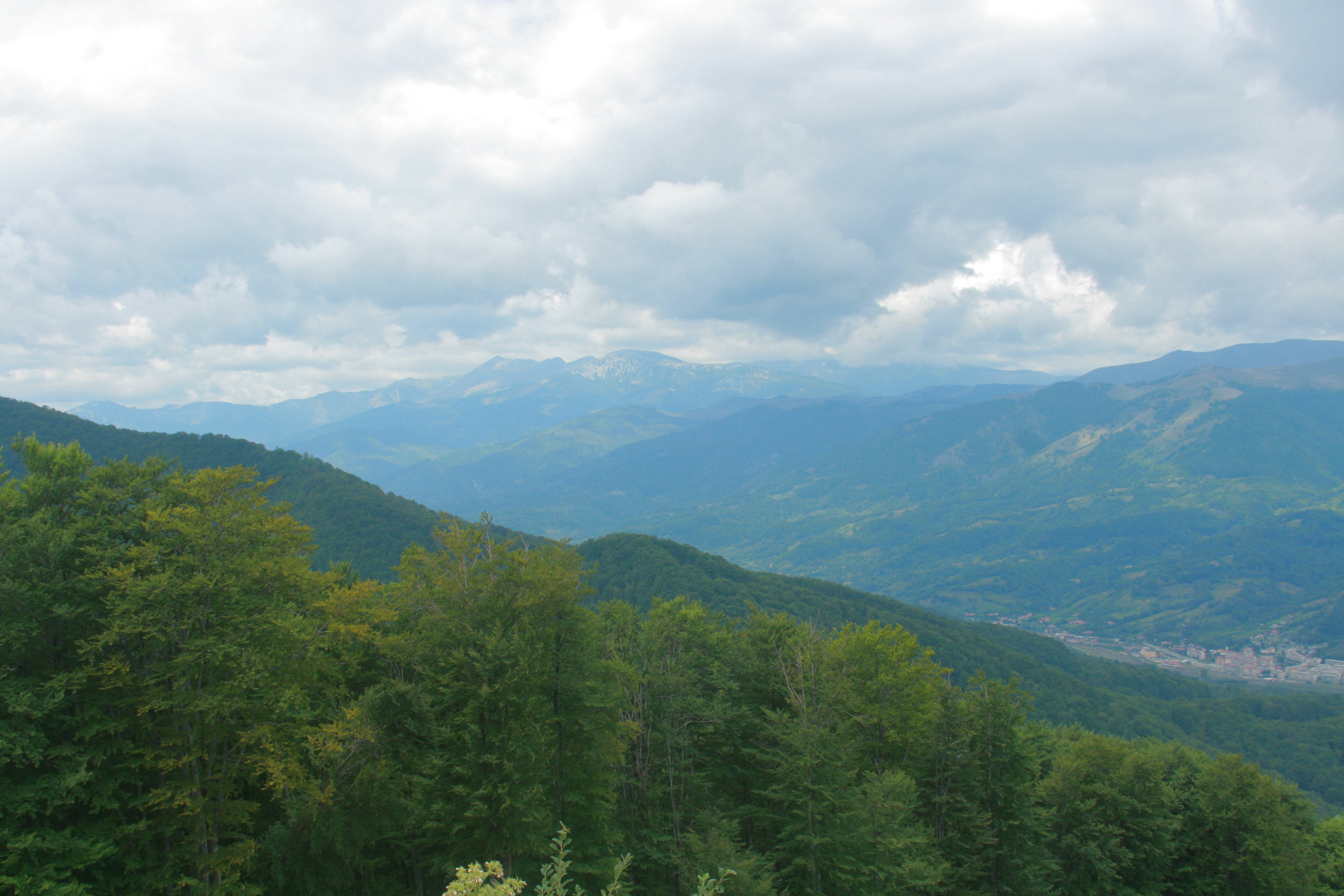
Lupeni, panoramic view

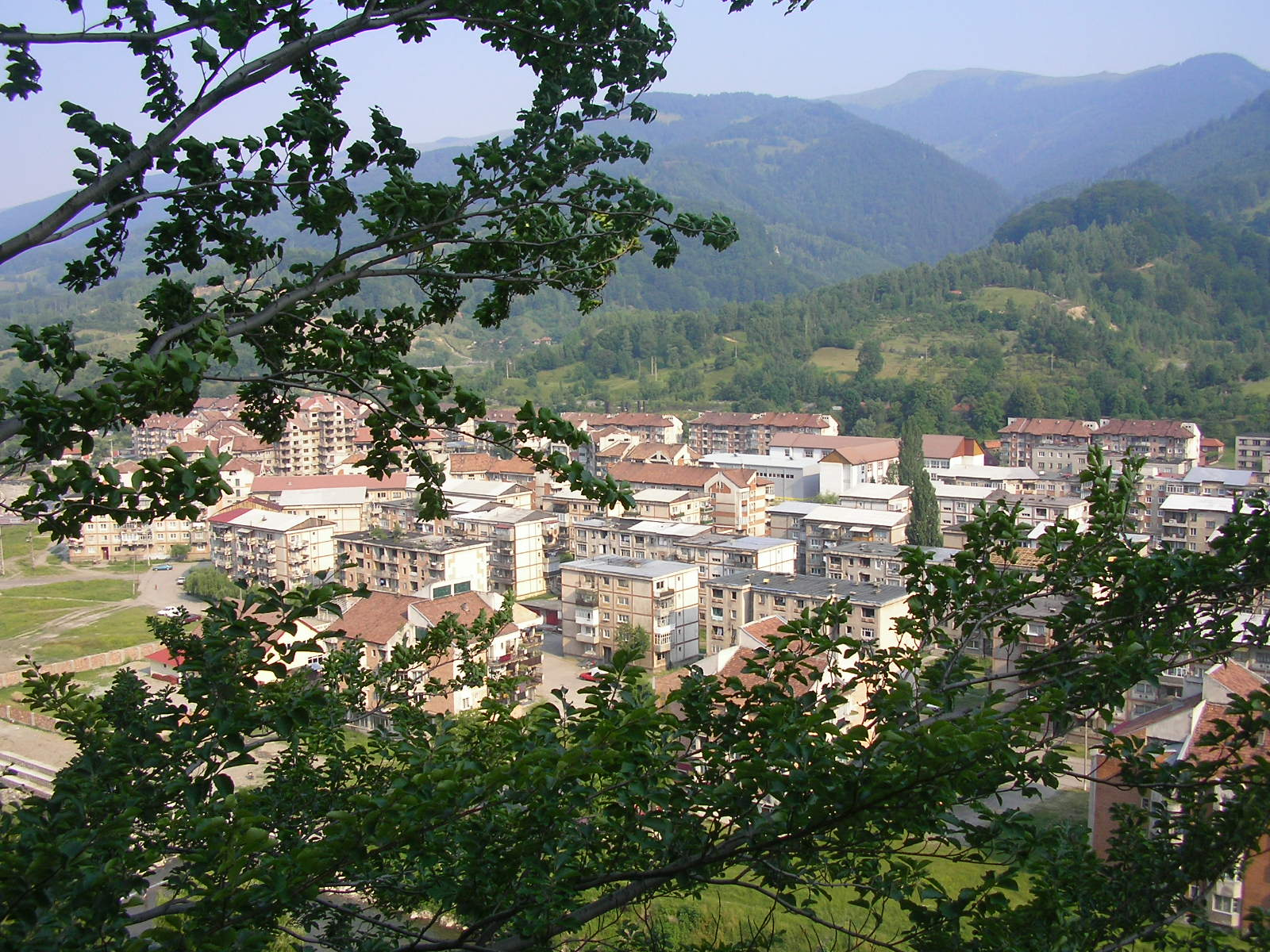
Uricani

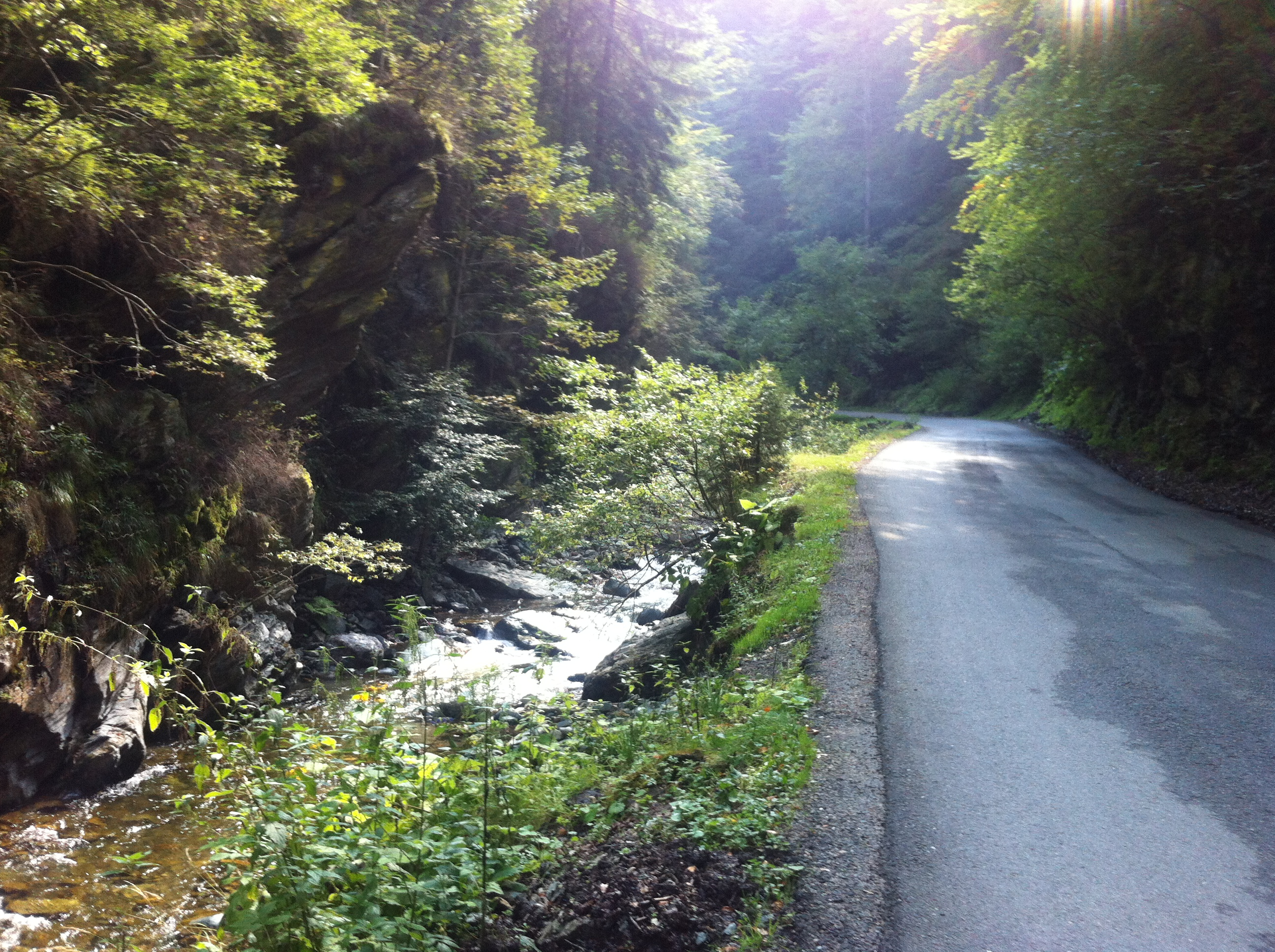
Scenery near Petrila

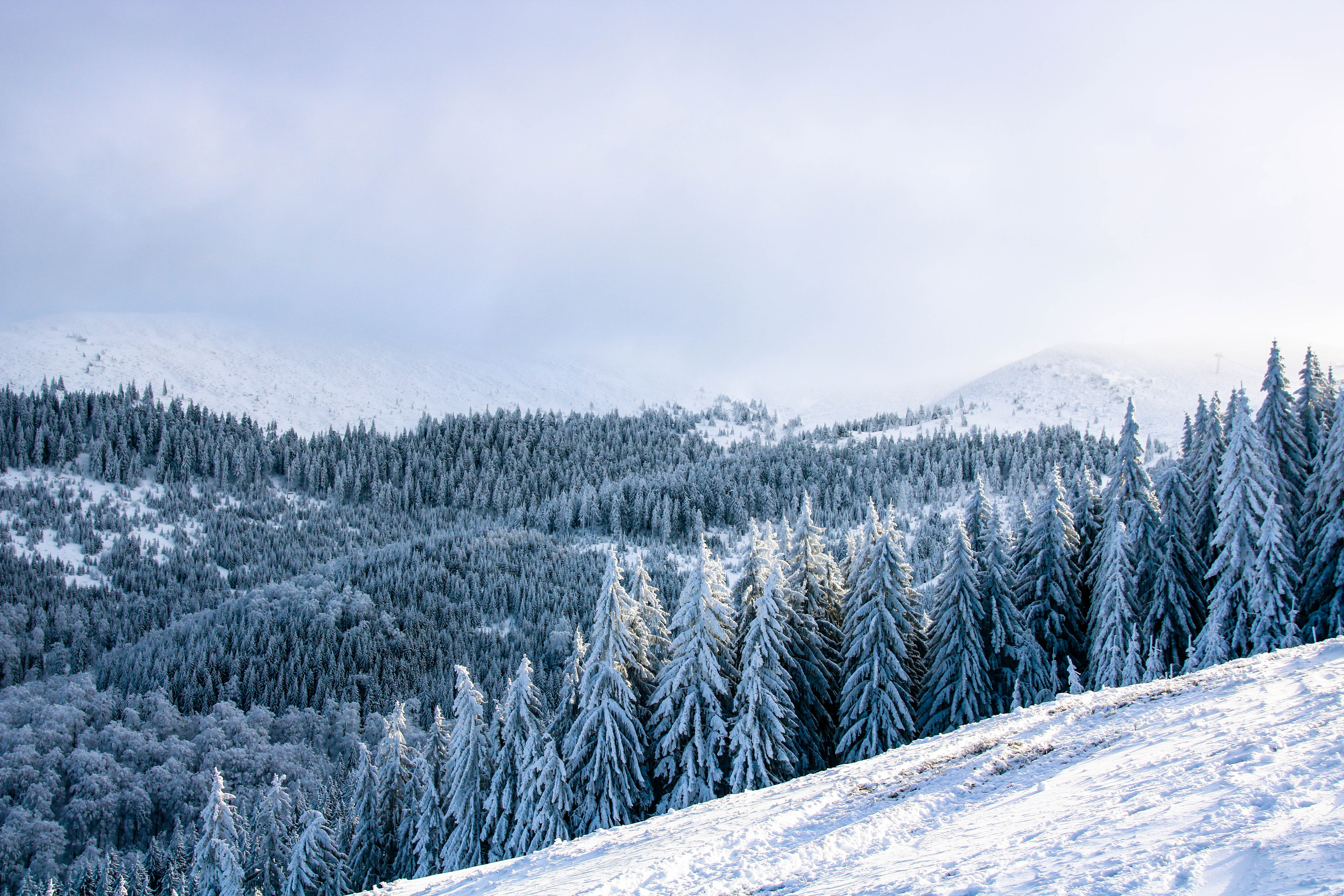
Scenery near Straja

There are several settlements in the area, the largest of which is the city of Petroșani, which was founded in the 17th century, and which is an important cultural centre of the region. Lupeni is a mining town which has played a major role historically in the area, as it was the site of the Lupeni Strike of 1929 and of the Jiu Valley miners' strike of 1977.

== Current situation ==
By 2011, the population of the Jiu Valley was 119,484 inhabitants, largely concentrated in the region's six small towns – Petroşani, Lupeni, Vulcan, Uricani, Petrila, and Aninoasa, but also including small villages such as Câmpu lui Neag, Lonea and Bănița. In the late 1990s most of the workforce still depended upon the mines for work and income, and by 2010 this number was still high, although the economic demographics of the region had undergone significant changes in recent years, particularly with the admittance of Romania into the European Union in 2007.

The region has experienced severe economic decline due to mines being closed and high unemployment, and the town of Aninoasa was called "the Detroit of Europe". Nevertheless, the Jiu Valley region was unevenly affected; for instance Petroşani, being the largest town of the region has long had a more diverse economy; while Straja has developed itself based on tourism as a mountain resort.

=== Active and closed mines ===
In 1990 there were 15 active mines in the Jiu Valley. In 2013, there were seven active mines; in 2015 the mine of Petrila was closed, and at the end of 2017, the mines of Uricani and Paroșeni were closed. Two other mines (Lonea and Lupeni) were set to be closed in 2018, but for the time being the activity will continue because their closing is not yet safe. As such, there are currently four active mines: Vulcan, Livezeni, Lonea and Lupeni. The government has announced plans to end mining in Jiu Valley by 2031. The mine from Lonea is to be closed by the end of 2025, the mine from Lupeni by June 2026, and the mines from Vulcan and Livezeni are to be closed by 2030.

The Jiu Valley mines were managed by the National Hard Coal Company (Romanian: Compania Naționala a Huilei) a commercial society set up by the Government of Romania in 1998. The company's main headquarters was located in Petroșani. The mines are scattered throughout the Jiu Valley. The locations of the active mines still active in 2006 were as follows: the Petrila Mine in the town of Petrila, the Lonea Mine at the village of Lonea, the Livezeni Mine at the city of Petroșani, the Paroşeni and Vulcan Mines at the town of Vulcan, the Aninoasa Mine located in the town of Aninoasa, and the Lupeni Mine and Bărbăţeni Mine in the city of Lupeni. Among the mines closed since 1989, the locations were as follows: Dâlja Mine (Petroșani), Iscroni Mine (Aninoasa), Lonea-Pilier Mine (Lonea), Petrila-Sud Mine (Petrila), Câmpul lui Neag Mine (Câmpul lui Neag), and the Uricani and Valea de Brazi Mines located near the town of Uricani.

=== Mining workforce and unemployment ===
Through mine closures, forced layoffs and voluntary severance, the number of actual miners in the Jiu Valley has decreased considerably. The mine closures were accompanied by large numbers of lay-offs of miners. It is estimated that in 1989 there were some 40,000-50,000 mine workers (including both actual underground miners and auxiliary workers). The number of mine workers in the Jiu Valley in 2000 was estimated to be between 18,000-20,000, this number decreasing by some sixty percent during the previous ten-year period. Approximately 25% of these total mine workers worked above ground. By 2012, only about 8,000 mine workers worked in the Jiu Valley, and by 2022 the number fell to less than 3,000.

Although there were also few jobs elsewhere in Romania, by 2000 unemployment was rampant in the Jiu Valley. Although many felt that this number was much higher, in 1999 the National Agency for the Development and Application of Reconstruction Programs in the Mining Regions (ANDIPRZM) estimated that over 16,000, or 25% of the working population, are unemployed, compared with the official statistics of the national average of 10%. While official estimates were lower, the former mayor of Lupeni (a city of then approximately 35,000 and the location of the largest mine in Romania) estimated that real unemployment in the city was nearly sixty percent in the year 2000.

=== Environmental pollution ===
The Jiu Valley suffers from significant pollution due to industrialization and geographical factors (being situated in a depression). The region has been for more than a century a strongly mono-industrial one, with the economy revolving around mining, and this has had a very negative impact upon the environment. After the collapse of the mining industry in the 1990s, the region was officially considered a disadvantaged area, but there were not sufficient resources to care for the environment. The main effects of pollution are the pollution of the underground waters which also affects the surface, and the air pollution. This negatively affects the health of the population. The climate of Jiu Valley is also unfavourable: the mountain protection hamper the refreshing of the air. Another effect is the pollution of Jiu river.

=== Social problems ===
Many of the social problems of Jiu Valley are common to other parts of Romania (such as poverty and unemployment), but these problems are affecting the region in an exacerbated way, due to factors such as the extreme mono-industrialization during the 20th century, the geographical isolation of the region, and the low level of education of the population. Increasingly this region is relying on the informal economy/black market in order to survive. Almost all activities in the area used to rely directly or indirectly on the mines, so when the mines were closed an economic and social shock occurred. There are very few opportunities outside mining due to the fact that the region is not an agricultural one (which would have offered a safety net in the form of subsistence agriculture). Much of the population is also uprooted and isolated, due to the fact that many of the workers were forcefully brought from other parts of the country during the communist regime. During the 1970s and 1980s, workers from pauper, rural counties from all over the country were brought in the Jiu Valley, which led to a heterogeneous population that made social networking difficult.
