= Lupeni =

- Municipality
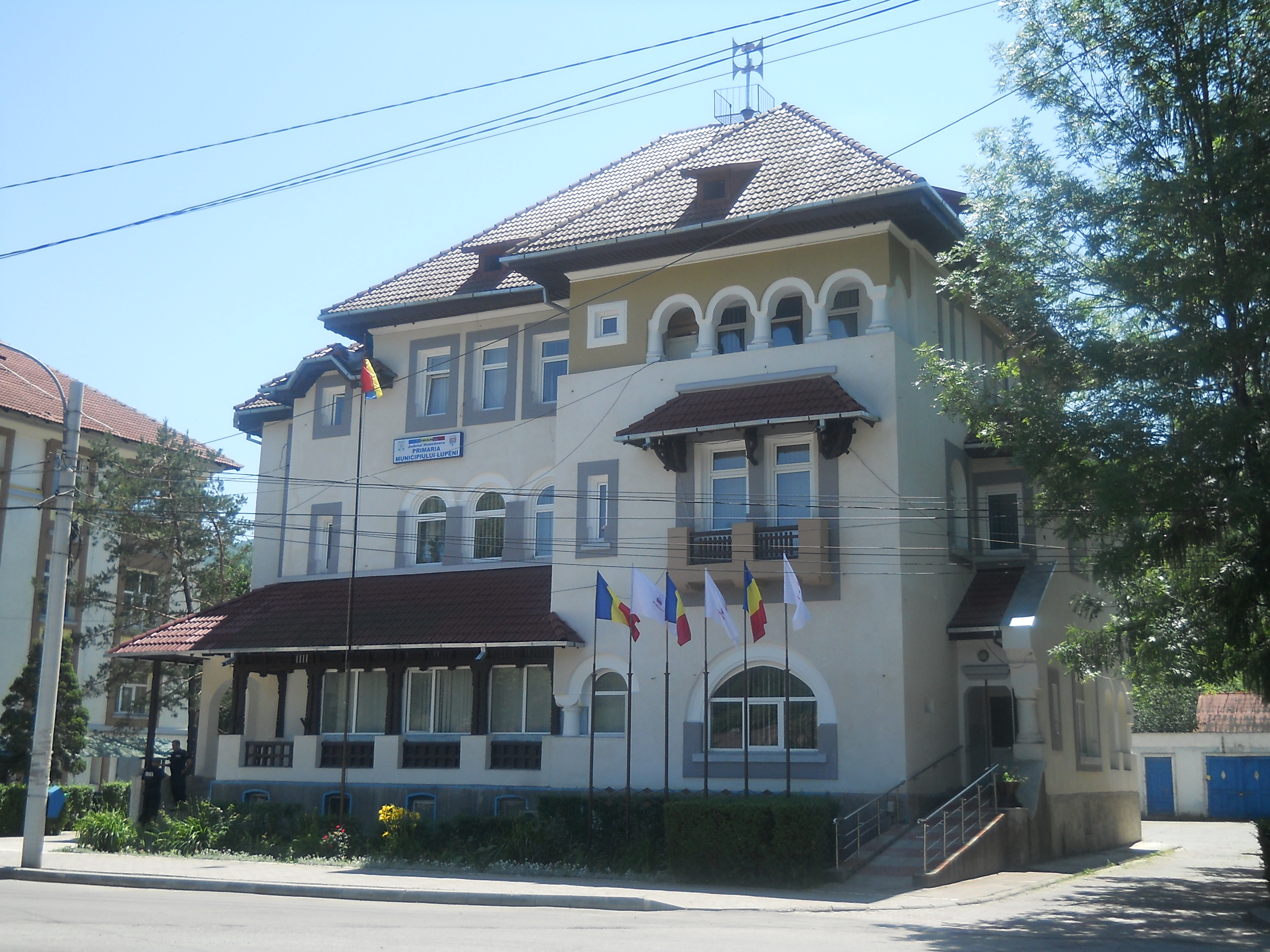
- Lupeni city hall

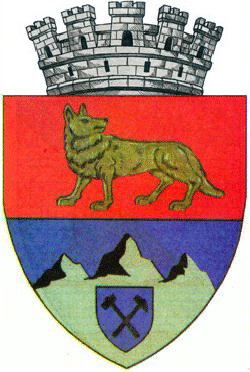
- Coat of arms

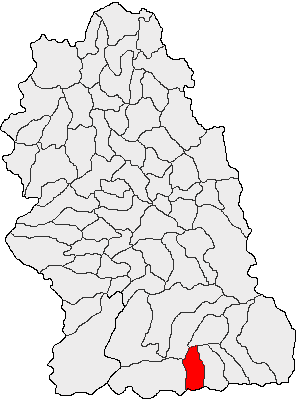
- Location in Hunedoara County

- Location in Romania
- Coordinates: 45°21′37″N 23°14′18″E
- Country: Romania
- County: Hunedoara

Government
  - Mayor (2024–2028): Lucian Resmeriță (PSD)
- Area: 77.73 km^{2} (30.01 sq mi)
- Elevation: 640 m (2,100 ft)
- Highest elevation: 725 m (2,379 ft)
- Lowest elevation: 625 m (2,051 ft)
- Population (2021-12-01): 18,699
  - Density: 240.6/km^{2} (623.1/sq mi)
- Time zone: UTC+02:00 (EET)
  - Summer (DST): UTC+03:00 (EEST)
- Postal code: 335600
- Area code: (+40) 02 54
- Vehicle reg.: HD
- Website: www.municipiullupeni.ro

Lupeni (Romanian pronunciation: [luˈpenʲ]; German: Schylwolfsbach, Hungarian: Lupény) is a mining city in the Jiu Valley in Hunedoara County, Romania, in the historical region of Transylvania. It is one of the oldest and largest cities in the Jiu Valley. It is located on the banks of the Western Jiu River within the Jiu Valley, at a height varying between 630 metres (2,070 ft) (in the east) and 760 metres (2,490 ft). The distance from Lupeni to Petroșani is 18 kilometres (11 mi) on the DN66A road, and to Deva (the capital of Hunedoara County) it is 114 km (71 mi).

The name is derived from the Romanian "lup", meaning "wolf". Throughout the second part of the 19th century and most of the 20th century, the city's economy was based on mining, but since the 1990s the economy has become more diverse, after many mines were closed.

== History ==
The first records of people inhabiting this area date back to prehistorical times, as evidenced by the discoveries made at the Straja-Lupeni hill cave, where old pottery objects were found. The city of Lupeni was first attested in 1770. During the Middle Ages, the Jiu Valley was sparsely populated, with the inhabitants living in small villages, and shepherding being the main activity.

Lupeni was formed as a result of the intense migration of people coming from Valea Streiului and Țara Hațegului, who were attracted by the rich pastures and hayfields of the area. The residents of the village of Valea Lupului (Wolf Valley) are those who are believed to have founded Lupeni.

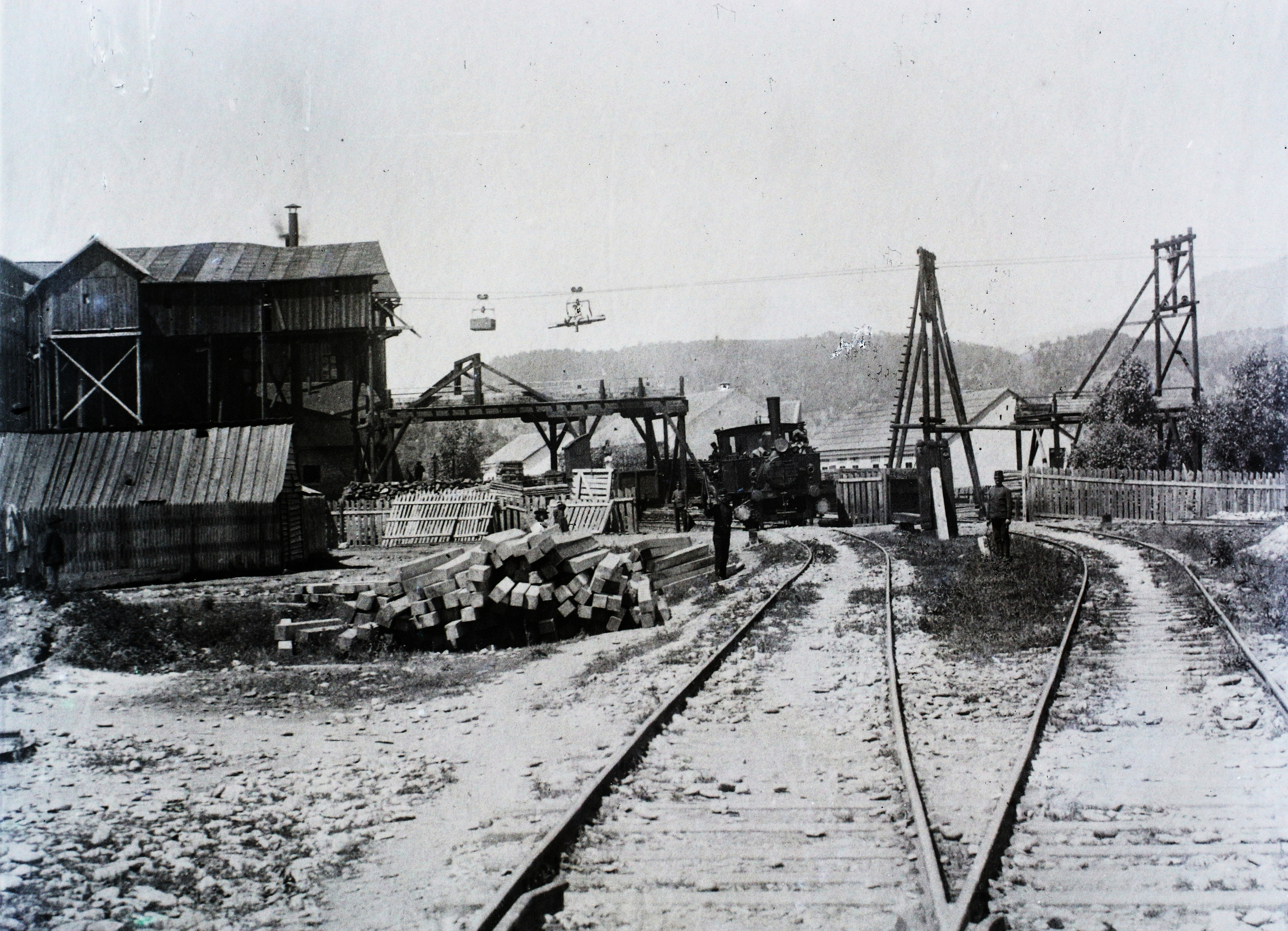
Mining in 1904

After 1840, mining exploration and exploitation started to develop in the area, and major economic and social changes took place. Foreign workers, primarily Polish, Czech, Austrian, Slovak, and Hungarian miners, as well as Romanian miners from the Apuseni Mountains and Baia Mare, were brought to work in the Jiu Valley. The mining activity began south of Lupeni. Lupeni soon become a major coal producer with a mono-industrial development, with about 80% of the population living from mining and other related activities. The city become very prosperous and experienced continuous population growth. However, the industrial development of the area was severely affected by the economic crisis of the interwar period, which eventually led to the Lupeni Strike of 1929.

Lupeni was declared a city in 1941, at which time it had 12,000 inhabitants. After World War II, over 600 Poles were repatriated from Lupeni to Kędzierzyn, Poland.

During the communist regime, the mines were nationalized by the communist government. In 1977, Lupeni was the site of the Jiu Valley miners' strike of 1977. After the Romanian Revolution of 1989, in the 1990s, mining operations entered a restructuring process that had a very strong social and economic impact on the city. A large number of mines were closed, and this also affected other related activities, such as suppliers of materials, equipment and services, and agents that operated in the trade and services areas. Nevertheless, in recent years, new areas of economic development emerged, such as tourism, forestry industry, bakery industry, and commerce.

The city's remaining active mine is the Lupeni Coal Mine managed by the Petroșani-based National Hard Coal Company.

== Population ==
Historical population
| Year | Pop. | ±% |
|---|---|---|
| 1956 | 21,188 | — |
| 1966 | 29,340 | +38.5% |
| 1977 | 28,280 | −3.6% |
| 1992 | 32,853 | +16.2% |
| 2002 | 31,409 | −4.4% |
| 2011 | 23,390 | −25.5% |
| 2021 | 18,699 | −20.1% |
Source: Census data

At the 2021 census, Lupeni had a population of 18,699. At the census from 2011, the population of the city was 23,390, with breakdown as follows.

=== By nationality ===
- Romanians: 19,465 (88.53%)
- Hungarians: 1,581 (7.19%)
- Roma (Gypsy): 735 (3.34%)
- Germans: 71 (0.32%)

=== By religion ===
- Orthodox: 24,815
- Roman Catholic: 1,921
- Reformed: 1,562
- Pentecostal: 688
- Greek Catholic: 501
- Baptist 200-300
- Other: 1,155

== Natives ==
- Ben-Oni Ardelean (born 1975), cleric and politician
- Ioan Botiș (born 1967), politician
- Lucian Burchel (born 1964), footballer
- Carol Creiniceanu (1939–2012), footballer
- János Fazekas (1926–2004), communist politician
- Gigi Militaru (born 1986), rugby player
- George Alexandru Pălămariu (born 1991), rower
- Vasile Patilineț (1923–1986), communist activist, politician, and diplomat
- Tatiana Stepa (1963–2009), folk singer
- Mihai Suder (1914–1984), communist politician
- Laurențiu Tudor (born 1997), footballer

== See also ==
- Bărbăteni Coal Mine
- Jiu Valley
