= League of Miners Unions of the Jiu Valley =

Union League
- League of Miners' Unions of the Jiu Valley
- Liga Sindicatelor Miniere din Valea Jiului
- Location: Romania

The Miners Union League of the Jiu Valley (Romanian: Liga Sindicatelor Miniere din Valea Jiului) represents the miners of the Jiu Valley.

== Membership ==
Union membership is voluntary, although it is widely accepted that all the miners are members of their respective mine's union. Union membership includes underground miners, individuals with jobs related to the mines, and retired miners. While there do not appear to be negative consequences to not joining the union, non-members are ineligible for benefits.

Members pay the Union approximately 1.5% of their monthly salaries (after income tax) in basic membership fees. However, members are also required to pay other fees for Union projects. These include sponsoring the Jiul Petroşani soccer team (which the Union supports because this team represents the Jiu Valley), as well as funds for the local miner's sports clubs (almost each mine has a soccer team, though Lupeni also has a rugby team, and Aninoasa also has an archery club and a kind of bowling team).

== Union Organization and Leadership ==
According to Romanian law, union representatives must be employees of the institutions/companies whose workers they represent. Once a member is elected as a union representative, he remains an employee of his respective mine. However, during his term of office in the union the union, not the mine company, pays his salary. The mine company is required by law to give union representatives unpaid leave until their elected term is over and must give them their job back when they return. The duration of a term for an elected union representative is generally 4 years. However, this may vary by individual mine union (e.g., the Paroșeni mine union's representatives are elected for 2 year terms).

Each mine has its own union organization, which is divided according to the mine's functional sectors (e. g., safety, production, transportation). Each sector elects their sector union representative. These sector representatives form the mine union council, but have no power representing the union, but each represent only their respective sector on the council. However, the overall mine union leadership and representatives (e.g., union president) are elected in a general vote of all union members in the mine regardless of sector.

The representatives (presidents) of each mine union form the voting council of the Liga Sindicatelor (Union League). These representatives then nominate candidates and elect the executive leadership of the Union League, i.e., President and an Executive President (equivalent of a Vice President or Executive Director). The elected team will then choose its support staff.

== Role of the Union ==
The Union League leadership claims to speak for all the miners of the Jiu Valley mines in most matters. As such they represent the miners in collective bargaining with the government and when calling for action by the miners (e.g., a strike). While their decisions are considered binding upon their members, there are examples of actions not supported by individuals or groups. This can be seen during the miner marches to Bucharest, where miners who did not agree with this action were not compelled to go. Those that remained did not appear to have suffered any negative consequences or retaliation or by the union, but continued to be members in good standing.

In exchange for their monthly fees and electing it to represent them, miners expect the union to do what it can to insure job security (e.g., prevent mine closures or downsizing), increase salaries, improve work conditions, and maintaining certain government perks conferred upon miners (e.g., reductions/discounts in home electric, hot water and other bills for miners and their families) during the rule of Nicolae Ceaușescu.

The Union League's role appears limited to the sponsorship and labor negotiating activities listed above (and individual member services such as contributing to funeral costs). The union at either the mine or league level does not appear to have played any role in any regional or local economic and community development. Despite the claims of some union representatives, union members in 2003 reported that the union does have any viable programs for worker training, unemployed workers (counseling, retraining, or placement), or community development (e.g., housing and environmental conditions).
