= National Hard Coal Company =

Romanian company

Compania Națională a Huilei
- Company type: Public
- Industry: Coal
- Founded: 1998
- Headquarters: Petroșani, Romania
- Key people: Daniel Surulescu, CEO
- Products: Bituminous coal
- Revenue: US$347 million (2007)
- Number of employees: 11,740 (2007)
- Website: http://www.cnh.ro/

The National Hard Coal Company (Romanian: Compania Naționala a Huilei) was set up as a commercial society by the Government of Romania in 1998. The main headquarters of the company is placed in Petroșani, the principal city in the coal mining region of Hunedoara County's Jiu Valley.
The company has its material base in Gorj, Hunedoara and Mehedinți counties with total reserves of 350 million tonnes of coal.

The annual production is around 3 million tonnes of bituminous coal and the total number of employees is around 12,000.

== Aninoasa coal mine ==
Aninoasa Coal Mine is an underground mining exploitation managed by the National Hard Coal Company, one of the largest in Romania located in Aninoasa in the south-western part of the country in Hunedoara County. The mine has reserves of 70.7 million tonnes of coal and annual production amounts to 0.4 million tonnes.

== See also ==
- Jiu Valley
- League of Miners Unions of the Jiu Valley
