= Underground soft-rock mining =

Mining techniques used to extract minerals/materials from sedimentary rock

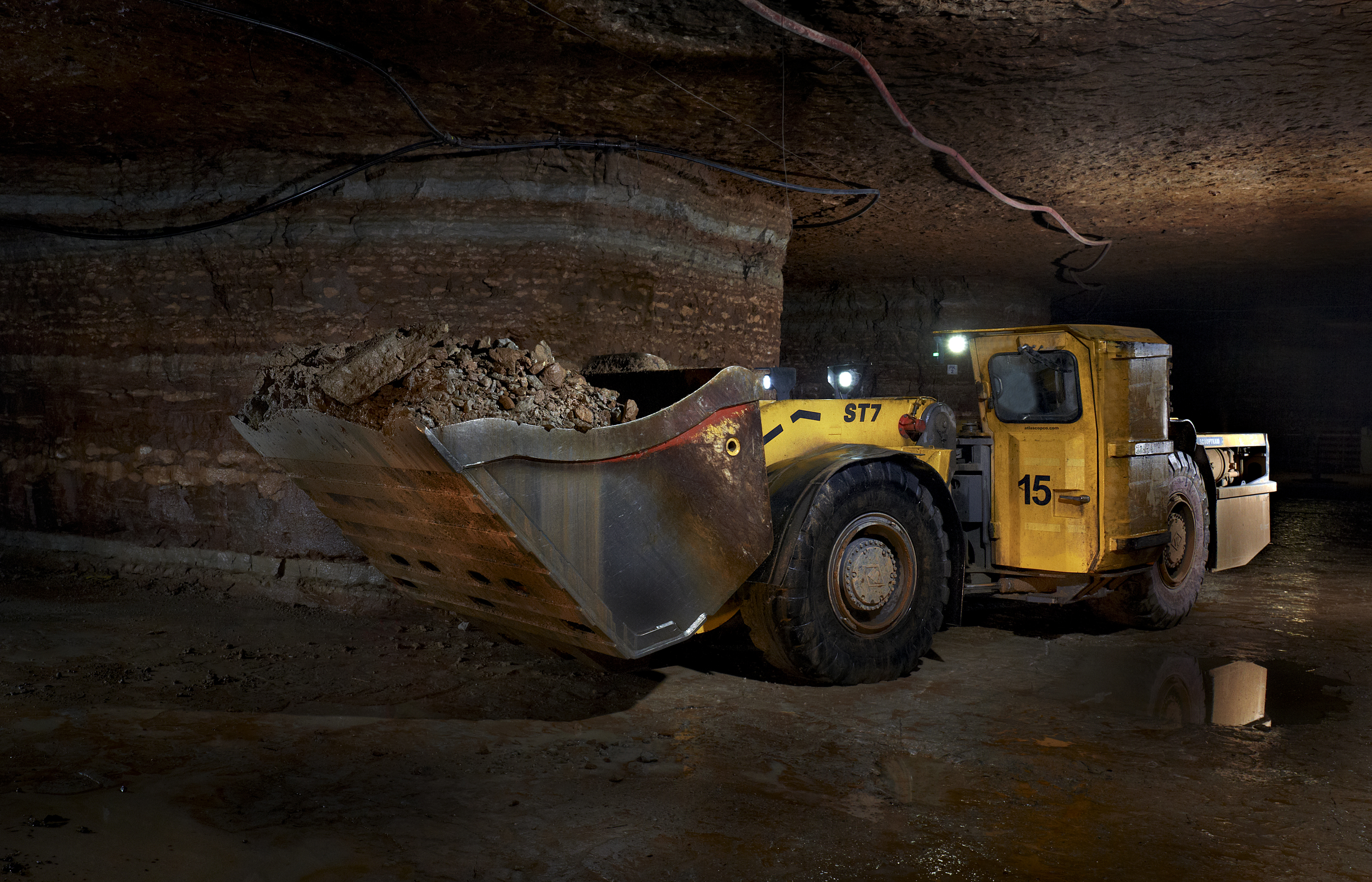
Underground mining of oil shale in VKG Ojamaa mine in Estonia

Underground soft-rock mining is a group of underground mining techniques used to extract coal, oil shale, potash, and other minerals or geological materials from sedimentary ("soft") rocks. Since deposits in sedimentary rocks are commonly layered and relatively less hard, the mining methods used differ from those used to mine deposits in igneous or metamorphic rocks (see underground hard-rock mining). Underground mining techniques also differ greatly from those of surface mining.

== Methods of underground soft rock mining ==
- Longwall mining – A set of longwall mining equipment consists of a coal shearer mounted on a conveyor operating underneath a series of self-advancing hydraulic roof supports. Almost the entire process can be automated. Longwall mining machines are typically 150–250 metres in width and 1.5 to 3 metres high. Longwall miners extract "panels" - rectangular blocks of coal as wide as the face the equipment is installed in, and as long as several kilometres. Powerful mechanical coal cutters (shearers) cut coal from the face, which falls onto an armoured face conveyor for removal. Longwalls can advance into an area of coal, or more commonly, retreat back between development tunnels (called "gateroads") As a longwall miner retreats back along with a panel, the roof behind the supports is allowed to collapse in a planned and controlled manner.
- Room-and-pillar mining – Room and pillar mining, also known as continuous mining, is commonly done in flat or gently dipping bedded ores. Pillars are left in place in a regular pattern while the rooms are mined out. In many room and pillar mines, the pillars are taken out, starting at the furthest point from the mine haulage exit, retreating, and letting the roof come down. Room and pillar methods are well adapted to mechanization, and are used in deposits such as coal, potash, phosphate, salt, oil shale, and bedded uranium ores.
- Blast mining – An older practice of coal mining that uses explosives such as dynamite to break up the coal seam, after which the coal is gathered and loaded onto shuttle cars or conveyors for removal to a central loading area. This process consists of a series of operations that begins with "cutting" the coalbed so it will break easily when blasted with explosives. This type of mining accounts for less than 5% of total underground production in the U.S. today.
- Shortwall mining – A coal mining method that accounts for less than 1% of deep coal production, shortwall involves the use of a continuous mining machine with moveable roof supports, similar to longwall. The continuous miner shears coal panels 150–200 feet wide and more than half a mile long, depending on other things like the strata of the earth and the transverse waves.
- Coal skimming – While no longer in general use, because of the massive amount of water needed and also as a result of the environmental damage caused by coal skimming, in the late 1930s DuPont developed a method that was much faster and less labour intensive than previous methods to separate the lighter coal from the mining refuse (e.g. slate) called "coal skimming" or the "sink and float method".

== See also ==
- Retreat mining
- National Mine Map Repository
