= Retezat =

Retezat can refer to:

- Retezat National Park, Romania
- Retezat Mountains, Romania
