= Păpușa =

Mountain in the Retezat Mountains, Romania

Coordinates: 45°22′12″N 22°54′28″E

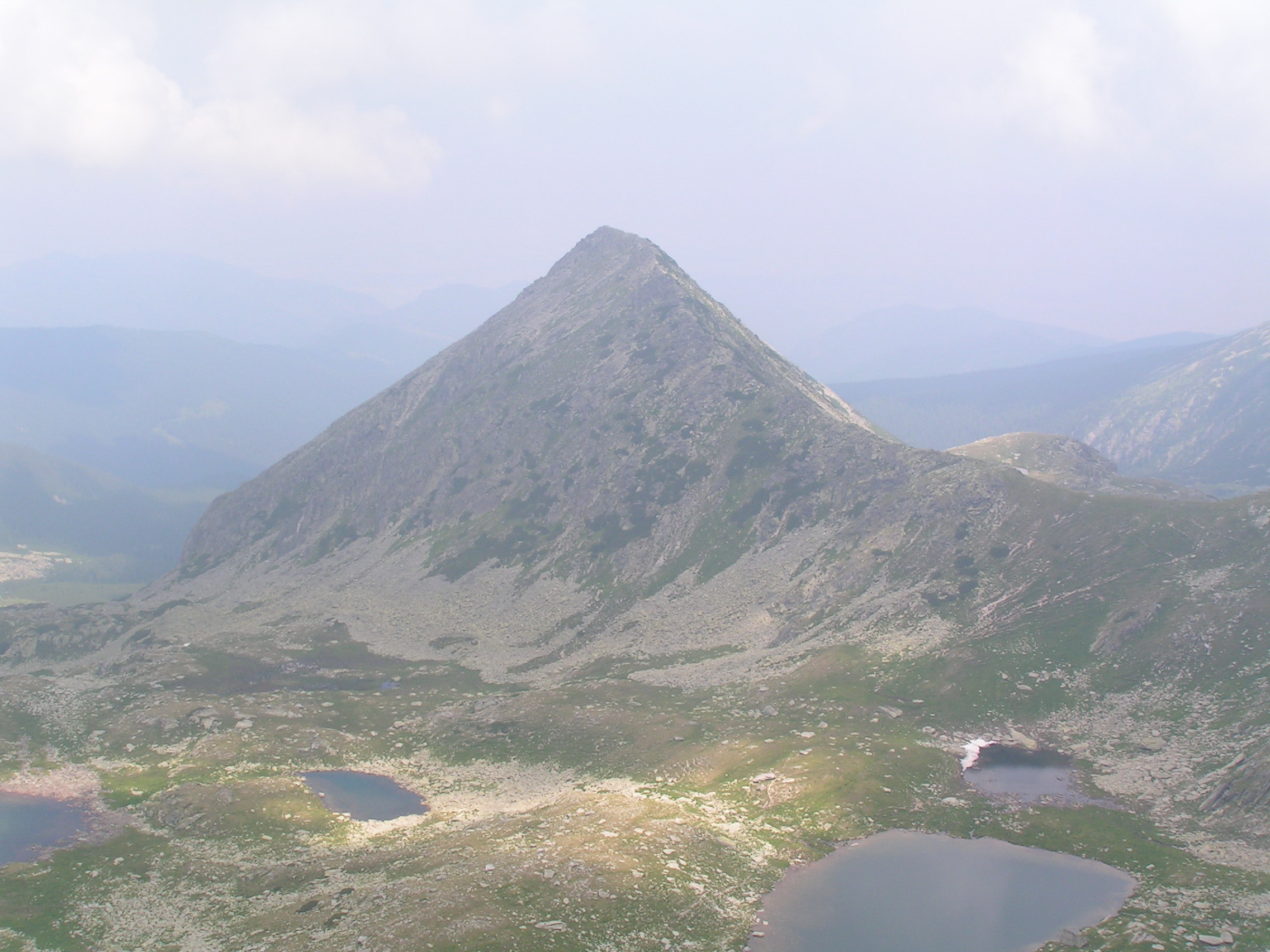
Păpușa Peak

Păpușa, standing at 2,508 metres (8,228 ft), is a mountain peak within the Retezat Mountains of the Southern Carpathians in Romania. It is the second highest peak within the Retezat Mountains, behind Peleaga (2,509 metres, 8,232 feet).

The Retezat Mountains have many glacial lakes, including the largest one in Romania, Bucura Lake (lacul Bucura), which covers 8.9 hectares (22 acres) and is situated at an altitude of 2,030 metres (6,660 ft). The area also contains the Retezat National Park, which was the first area in Romania to be designated as a national park.

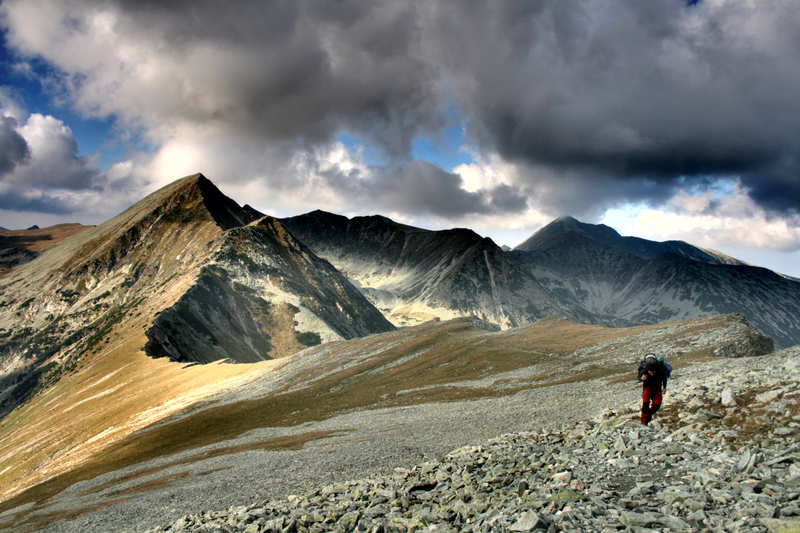
Păpușa Peak in background (left side)
