= Zănoaga River =

Zănoaga River may refer to the following rivers in Romania:

- Zănoaga, a tributary of the Balomir in Hunedoara County
- Zănoaga, a tributary of the Bâsca Mică in Buzău County
- Zănoaga, a tributary of the Florei in Prahova County
- Zănoaga, a tributary of the Ialomița in Dâmbovița County
- Zănoaga, a tributary of the Judele in Hunedoara County
- Zănoaga, a tributary of the Lazăr in Hunedoara County
- Zănoaga, a tributary of the Pârâul Galben in Gorj County
- Zănoaga, a tributary of the Râul Mare in Alba County
- Zănoaga, a tributary of the Sadu in Gorj County
- Zănoaga, a tributary of the Șușița in Gorj County
