= Balomir =

Balomir may refer to:

- Balomir (river), a river in Romania
- Balomir (Sântămăria-Orlea), a village in Hunedoara County, Romania, part of commune Sântămăria-Orlea
- Balomiru de Câmp, a village in Alba County, Romania, part of commune Șibot
