= SS Noemi =

A number of steamships have been named Noemi, including:

- SS Noemijulia, a 2,489 GRT cargo ship built in 1895
- SS Noemi (1895), in service 1926–1930
- SS Noemi (1942), in service 1961–1965
