= Pârâu Crucii =

Pârâu Crucii may refer to several places in Romania:

- Pârâu Crucii, a village in Pogăceaua Commune, Mureș County
- Pârâu Crucii, a village in Râciu Commune, Mureș County
- Pârâul Crucii, a tributary of the Braia in Hunedoara County
