= Buta (Jiu) =

- Location within Romania

Location
- Country: Romania
- Counties: Hunedoara County

Physical characteristics
- Source: Lake Buta
  - location: Retezat Mountains
  - coordinates: 45°19′04″N 22°53′51″E
  - elevation: 1,756 m (5,761 ft)
- Mouth: Jiul de Vest
  - coordinates: 45°17′50″N 22°59′10″E
  - elevation: 858 m (2,815 ft)
- Length: 8 km (5.0 mi)
- Basin size: 20 km^{2} (7.7 sq mi)

Basin features
- Progression: Jiul de Vest→ Jiu→ Danube→ Black Sea
- Tributaries
  - right: Buta Mică

The Buta is a small left tributary of the river Jiul de Vest in Romania. It discharges into the Jiul de Vest upstream from Câmpu lui Neag. Its length is 8 km (5.0 mi) and its basin size is 20 km^{2} (7.7 sq mi).
