= Buta =

Buta may refer to:

== People ==
- George Buta, Romanian biathlete
- Buta (rapper), Kosovo-Albanian rapper

== Places ==
- Buta, Democratic Republic of the Congo, a town in the northern Democratic Republic of the Congo
- Buta Territory, Democratic Republic of the Congo
- Boota, a village in Punjab, Pakistan
- Buta, Burundi, a town in Burundi
- Buta, a village in Negrași commune, Argeș County, Romania
- Buta, a village in Crâmpoia commune, Olt County, Romania
- Buta (Jiu), a tributary of the Jiul de Vest in Hunedoara County, Romania
- Buta, a tributary of the Lotru in Vâlcea County, Romania
- Buta Mică, a tributary of the river Buta in Hunedoara County, Romania

== Other ==
- Buta language
- Buta (film), a 2011 Azerbaijani film
- Buta (ornament), an almond-shaped ornament with a sharp-curved upper end
- Paisley (design) or buta, an Iranian droplet/flame shaped motif used in carpet design
- Buta, a Philippine term for karst caves and holes where edible bird's nests are found
- Buta Airways, an Azerbaijani airline
- Buta, the generic term for a prayer in Mandaeism
