= SS Irish Hazel =

Two steamships operated by Irish Shipping were named Irish Hazel

- SS Irish Hazel (1895), under repair 1941–43, requisitioned by the United Kingdom, returned 1945 and in service until 1949
- SS Irish Hazel (1949), in service 1950–60
