= Braia =

Braia may refer to:

- Braia, a village in the commune Bastia Mondovì, Piedmont, Italy
- Braia (river), a tributary of the Jiul de Vest in Hunedoara County, Romania
- Braia, a tributary of the Argeș in Argeș County, Romania
