= Valea de Pești =

- Location within Romania

Location
- Country: Romania
- Counties: Gorj County, Hunedoara County

Physical characteristics
- Mouth: Jiul de Vest
  - location: Downstream of Câmpu lui Neag
  - coordinates: 45.3031°N 23.0597°E
- Length: 11 km (6.8 mi)
- Basin size: 32 km^{2} (12 sq mi)

Basin features
- Progression: Jiul de Vest→ Jiu→ Danube→ Black Sea
- Tributaries
  - left: Zamora, Strâmbu, Valea Seacă, Pârâul Mare
  - right: Ștevioara, Călani

The Valea de Pești is a right tributary of the river Jiul de Vest in Romania. It flows into the Jiul de Vest near Câmpu lui Neag. The Valea de Pești Dam is built on this river. Its length is 11 km (6.8 mi) and its basin size is 32 km^{2} (12 sq mi).
