= Crevedia (Jiu) =

- Location within Romania

Location
- Country: Romania
- Counties: Hunedoara County

Physical characteristics
- Mouth: Jiul de Vest
  - location: Vulcan
  - coordinates: 45.3829°N 23.2856°E
- Length: 12 km (7.5 mi)
- Basin size: 34 km^{2} (13 sq mi)

Basin features
- Progression: Jiul de Vest→ Jiu→ Danube→ Black Sea
- Tributaries
  - right: Corbu

The Crevedia is a left tributary of the river Jiul de Vest in Romania. It flows into the Jiul de Vest in the city Vulcan. Its length is 12 km (7.5 mi) and its basin size is 34 km^{2} (13 sq mi).
