= Merișoara =

- Location within Romania

Location
- Country: Romania
- Counties: Hunedoara County

Physical characteristics
- Mouth: Jiul de Vest
  - location: Vulcan
  - coordinates: 45.3814°N 23.2834°E
- Length: 9 km (5.6 mi)
- Basin size: 11 km^{2} (4.2 sq mi)

Basin features
- Progression: Jiul de Vest→ Jiu→ Danube→ Black Sea

The Merișoara is a right tributary of the river Jiul de Vest in Romania. It flows into the Jiul de Vest in the city Vulcan. Its length is 9 km (5.6 mi) and its basin size is 11 km^{2} (4.2 sq mi).
