= Stadionul Minerul (Uricani) =

Stadium in Romania

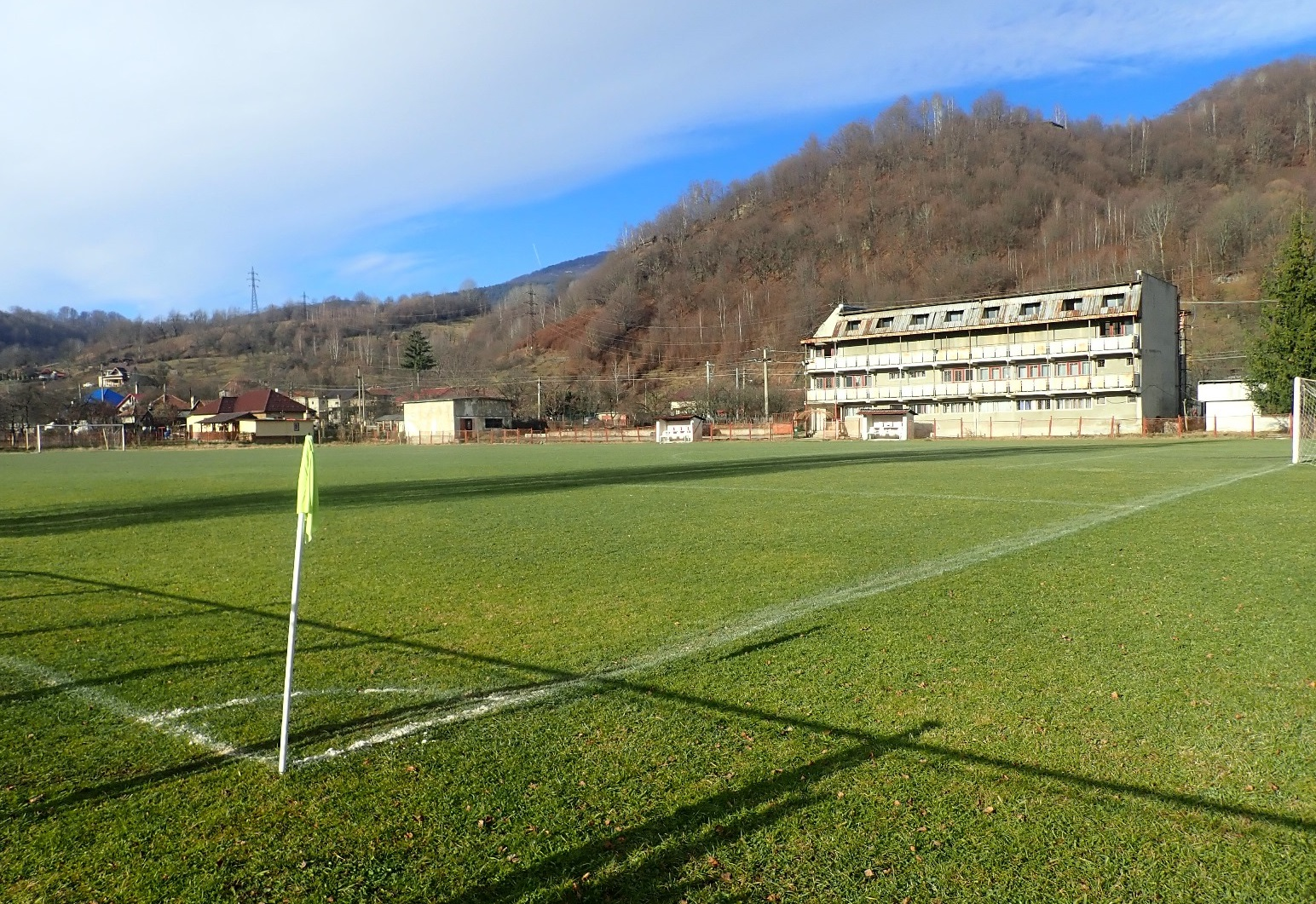
- Interactive map of Stadionul Minerul
- Address: Str. Principală (DN 66A)
- Location: Uricani, Romania
- Coordinates: 45°20′12.3″N 23°08′03.9″E
- Owner: Town of Uricani
- Operator: Minerul Uricani
- Capacity: 500 seated
- Surface: Grass

Construction
- Opened: 1950s

Tenant
- Minerul Uricani (1957–present)

Stadionul Minerul is a multi-purpose stadium in Uricani, Romania. It is currently used mostly for football matches, has a capacity of 500 people (on seats) and is the home ground of Minerul Uricani.
