= ACS Minerul Uricani =

Association football club in Romania

Minerul Uricani
- Full name: Asociația Club Sportiv Minerul Uricani
- Nicknames: Minerii (The Miners)
- Short name: Uricani
- Founded: 1957; 69 years ago
- Ground: Minerul
- Capacity: 500
- Owner: Uricani Town
- Chairman: Vasile Scurtu
- Manager: Toni Sedecaru
- League: Liga IV
- 2025–26: Liga IV, Hunedoara, 2nd of 11
Home colours	Away colours

Asociația Club Sportiv Minerul Uricani, commonly known as Minerul Uricani, is a Romanian football club based in Uricani, Hunedoara County and currently playing in the Liga IV – Hunedoara County, the fourth tier of the Romanian football league system.

== History ==
Minerul Uricani was founded in the summer of 1957, backed by the Uricani Coal Mine and representing the local mining community, one of six in the Jiu Valley, which had been operational since 1947. The team competed for several decades in the Hunedoara regional and county championships.

In the 1986–87 season, managed by Dumitru Iacob, Minerul won the county championship for the first time but failed to secure promotion, losing 0–3 on aggregate (0–1 at home and 0–2 away) in the promotion play-off against Auto Timișoara, the Timiș County Championship winner.

At the end of the 1989–90 season, with Dorel Maria as head coach, Minerul earned promotion to Divizia C after winning the county championship and defeating Minerul Oravița, the Caraș-Severin County winners, in the promotion play-off (3–0 at Uricani and 0–1 at Oravița). The squad included, among others: Szilvester, Alecu, Irimuș, Ceacusta, Bățălan, Fazekaș, Feri Varga, Căuneac, Postelnicu, Alexandru Ion, Dulcu, Gîtan, Toma, and Lumperdean.

Thirteen consecutive seasons followed in the third division, with Minerul generally finishing in the upper half of the standings. The club’s best results came in its first season, 1990–91, when it finished as runners-up in Series VIII, followed by a 3rd-place finish in the 1991–92 season and 4th place on two occasions, in 1991–93 and 1992–94. During this period, Minerul had players such as Popescu, Szilverster, Claudiu Roșca, Ștefanache, Irimuș, Orminișan, Hristea, V. Roșca, Lăcătușu, Neculai Băltaru, Vasile Scurtu, Dulcu, and M. Topor.

In the 1994–95 season, the team finished in 6th place in Series IV, with Dorel Maria as head coach. The squad included: Szilverster (Ștefan Munteanu) – Nicoară, Ștefănache (Irimuș), V. Roșca, Claudiu Roșca (Grecu) – M. Topor, Cristian Florescu (Bal), Sârghia, Szoradi – Nicolae Iordache, I. Mureșan.

The team coached by Dorel Maria and Marian Mihai with players like: M. Topor, Szoradi, Cr. Florescu, Nicolae Krautil, Ioan Varga, Florin Iordache or Viorel Păuna, finished on the 9th place in the 1995–96 season.

In the following three seasons, Minerul Uricani held positions between 5th and 14th: 5th in 1996–97, 14th in 1997–98, and 9th in 1998–99.

In the 1999–2000 season, Minerul Uricani finished in 9th place, with two coaches: Cristian Florescu (rounds 1–13) and Neculai Băltaru (rounds 14–34). The squad included players such as Vasile Scurtu (11 goals), Alin Farcaș, Anton Ilie, Irimuș, Hristea, Gigel Bană, Matache, Florin Iordache, and Vali Pop.

After finishing 7th in the 2000–01 season, the team had two difficult seasons: 15th in 2001–02 and 14th in 2002–03, which led to their relegation back to the county championship.

In the 2004–05 season, coached by Ioan Dosan, Minerul Uricani won the Divizia D – Hunedoara and returned to Divizia C, where it survived only two seasons: 2005–06, finishing in 8th place, and 2006–07, finishing 17th.

The following years were stagnant, with Minerul consistently finishing in the upper half of the league table but unable to move beyond the fourth Division.

In the 2010–11 season, head coach Neculai Băltaru, combining the experience of players such as Cornel Irina, Sansiro Ciocoi, Raul Cizmașiu, Viorel Mihăilescu, and Remus Moldovan, with young players like goalkeeper Adrian Farcaș, Elian Preoteasa, and Andrei Nistor, led the team to a strong season, finishing in 2nd place and becoming serious contenders to Jiul Petroșani for promotion.

Since then, due to economic decline and the closure of the Coal Mine, the club has struggled to survive, playing football only at the level of the fourth league, with poor results, consistently finishing at the bottom of the standings.

== Honours ==
Liga III

- Runners-up (1): 1990–91

Liga IV – Hunedoara County

- Winners (3): 1986–87, 1989–90, 2004–05
- Runners-up (1): 2010–11

== League history ==
Season	Tier	Division	Place	Notes	Cupa României
2023–24	4	Liga IV (HD)	12th		
2022–23	4	Liga IV (HD)	8th		
2021–22	4	Liga IV (HD)	10th		
2020–21	4	Liga IV (HD)	9th		
2019–20	4	Liga IV (HD)	9th		
2018–19	4	Liga IV (HD)	8th		
2017–18	4	Liga IV (HD)	13th		
2016–17	4	Liga IV (HD)	12th		
2015–16	4	Liga IV (HD)	11th		
2014–15	4	Liga IV (HD)	14th		
2013–14	4	Liga IV (HD)	13th		
2012–13	4	Liga IV (HD)	3rd		
2011–12	4	Liga IV (HD)	4th		
2010–11	4	Liga IV (HD)	2nd		
2009–10	4	Liga IV (HD)	3rd		
2008–09	4	Liga IV (HD)	3rd		
2007–08	4	Liga IV (HD)			
2006–07	3	Divizia C (Seria IV)	17th	Relegated	
2005–06	3	Divizia C (Seria VI)	8th		

Season	Tier	Division	Place	Notes	Cupa României
2004–05	4	Divizia D (HD)	1st (C)	Promoted	
2003–04	4	Divizia D (HD)	?		
2002–03	3	Divizia C (Seria VI)	14th	Relegated	
2001–02	3	Divizia C (Seria V)	15th		
2000–01	3	Divizia C (Seria VI)	13th		
1999–00	3	Divizia C (Seria IV)	9th		
1998–99	3	Divizia C (Seria III)	9th		
1997–98	3	Divizia C (Seria III)	14th		
1996–97	3	Divizia C (Seria III)	5th		
1995–96	3	Divizia C (Seria III)	9th		
1994–95	3	Divizia C (Seria IV)	6th		
1992–94	3	Divizia C (Seria III)	4th		
1991–93	3	Divizia C (Seria III)	4th		
1991–92	3	Divizia C (Seria IX)	3rd		
1990–91	3	Divizia C (Seria VIII)	2nd		
1989–90	4	County Championship (HD)	1st (C)	Promoted	
1988–89	4	County Championship (HD)	3rd		
