= Peleaga =

Mountain in Romania

Vârful Peleaga
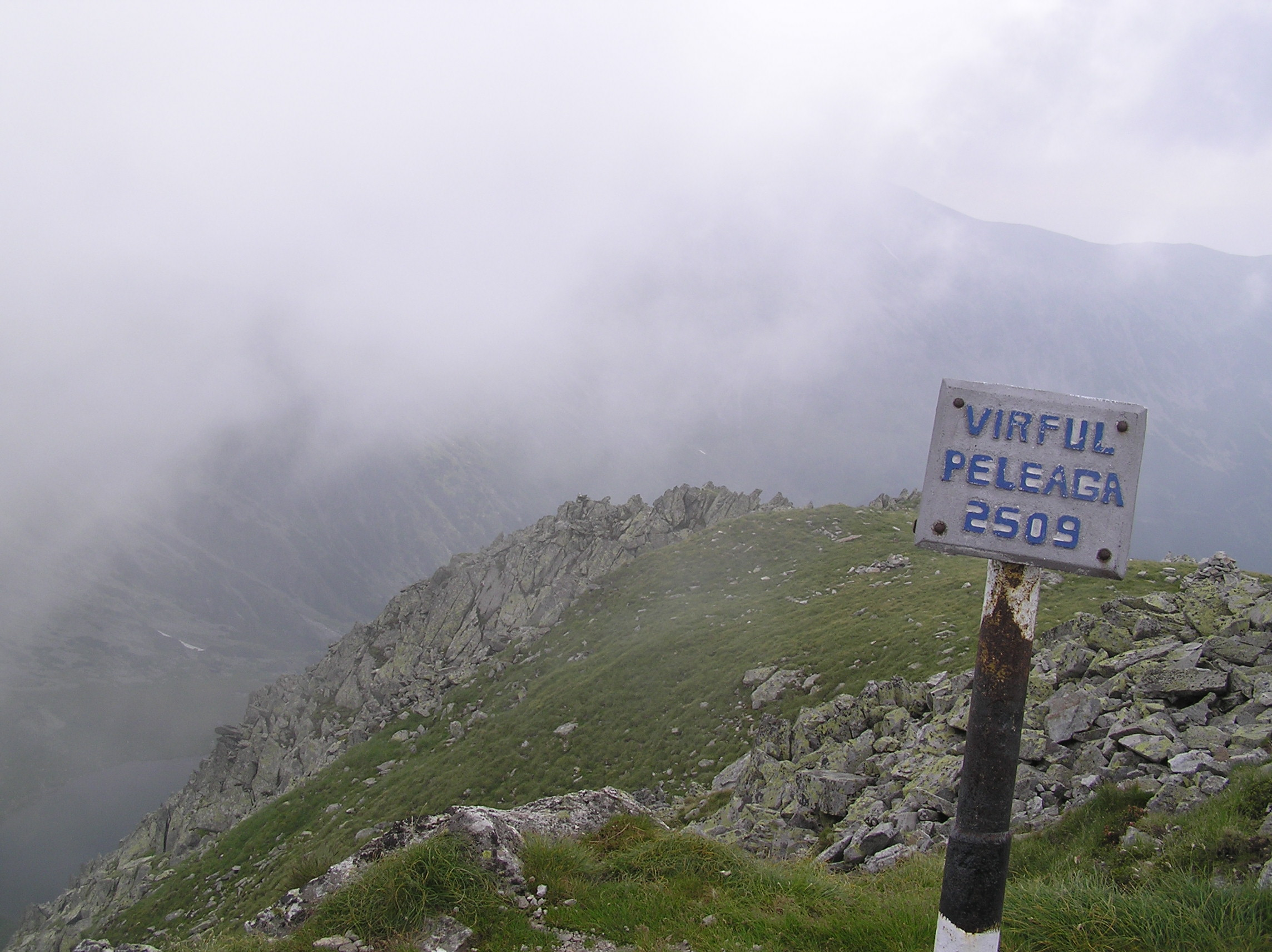
- Sign indicating the elevation at the Peleaga summit

Highest point
- Elevation: 2,509 m (8,232 ft)
- Prominence: 1,759 m (5,771 ft)
- Listing: Ultra
- Coordinates: 45°21′58″N 22°53′40″E

Geography
- Location within Romania
- Location: Hunedoara County, Romania
- Parent range: Retezat Mountains, Southern Carpathians

Peleaga (Vârful Peleaga) is a mountain in Romania. It is the highest point in the Retezat Mountains with a summit elevation of 2,509 metres (8,232 feet) above sea level. Peleaga is located in Hunedoara County, and lies within the historical region of Transylvania in central Romania.

In addition to its highest peak Peleaga, the Retezat Mountains, part of the Southern Carpathians, are home to some of the highest massifs in Romania. Other important peaks in the range are Păpușa (Vârful Păpușa) and Retezat Peak (Vârful Retezat). The Retezat Mountains have many glacial lakes, including the largest one in Romania, Bucura Lake (Lacul Bucura), which covers 8.9 ha (22 acres), at an elevation of 2,030 m (6,660 ft). The area also contains the Retezat National Park, Romania's first national park.

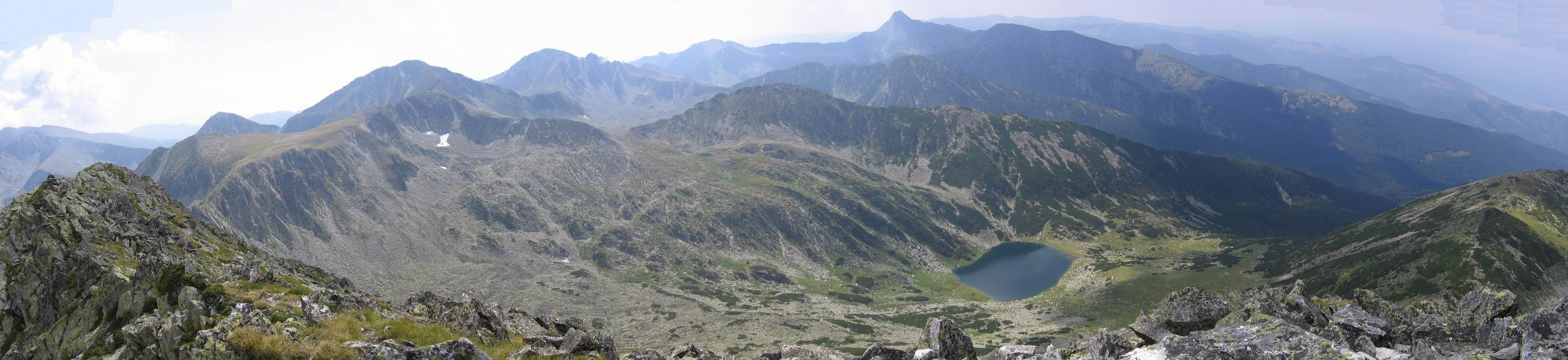
The Retezat Mountains seen from atop one of them (Vârfu Mare, "The Big Peak")

== See also ==
- List of European ultra prominent peaks
