= Retezat Mountains =

Mountain range in Romania

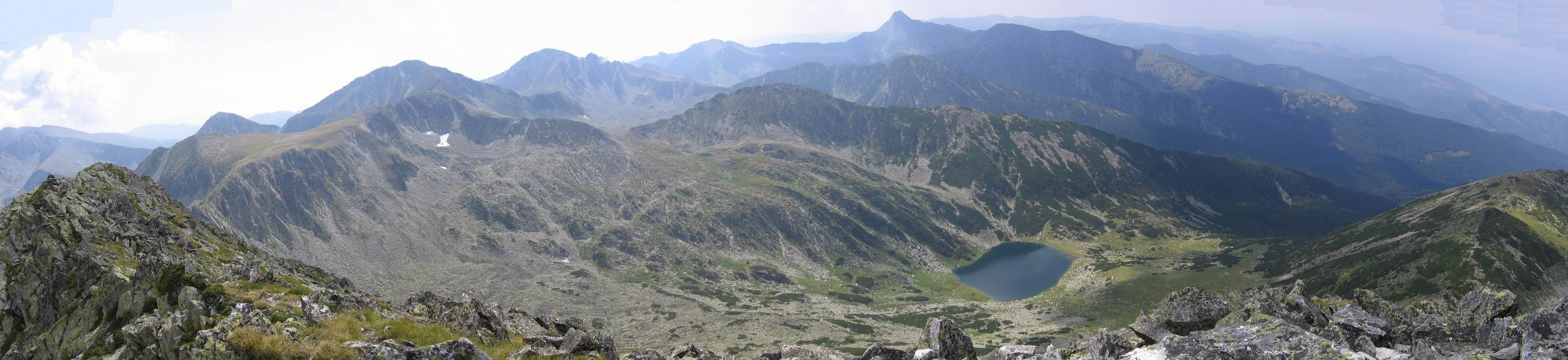
- The Retezat Mountains seen from atop one of them (Vârfu Mare, "The Big Peak")

Highest point
- Peak: Peleaga
- Elevation: 2,509 m (8,232 ft)
- Coordinates: 45°21′57″N 22°53′33″E

Naming
- Native name: Munții Retezat (Romanian)

Geography
- Country: Romania
- Range coordinates: 45°22′N 22°52′E
- Parent range: Southern Carpathians
- Borders on: Alps

Geology
- Orogeny: Alpine orogeny

The Retezat Mountains (Romanian: Munții Retezat, Hungarian: Retyezát-hegység) are one of the highest massifs in Romania, being part of the Southern Carpathians. The highest peak is Peleaga (Vârful Peleaga), at an altitude of 2,509 metres (8,232 ft). Other important peaks are Păpușa (Vârful Păpușa, "the Doll Peak") and Retezat Peak (Vârful Retezat). The name means "cut off" in Romanian.

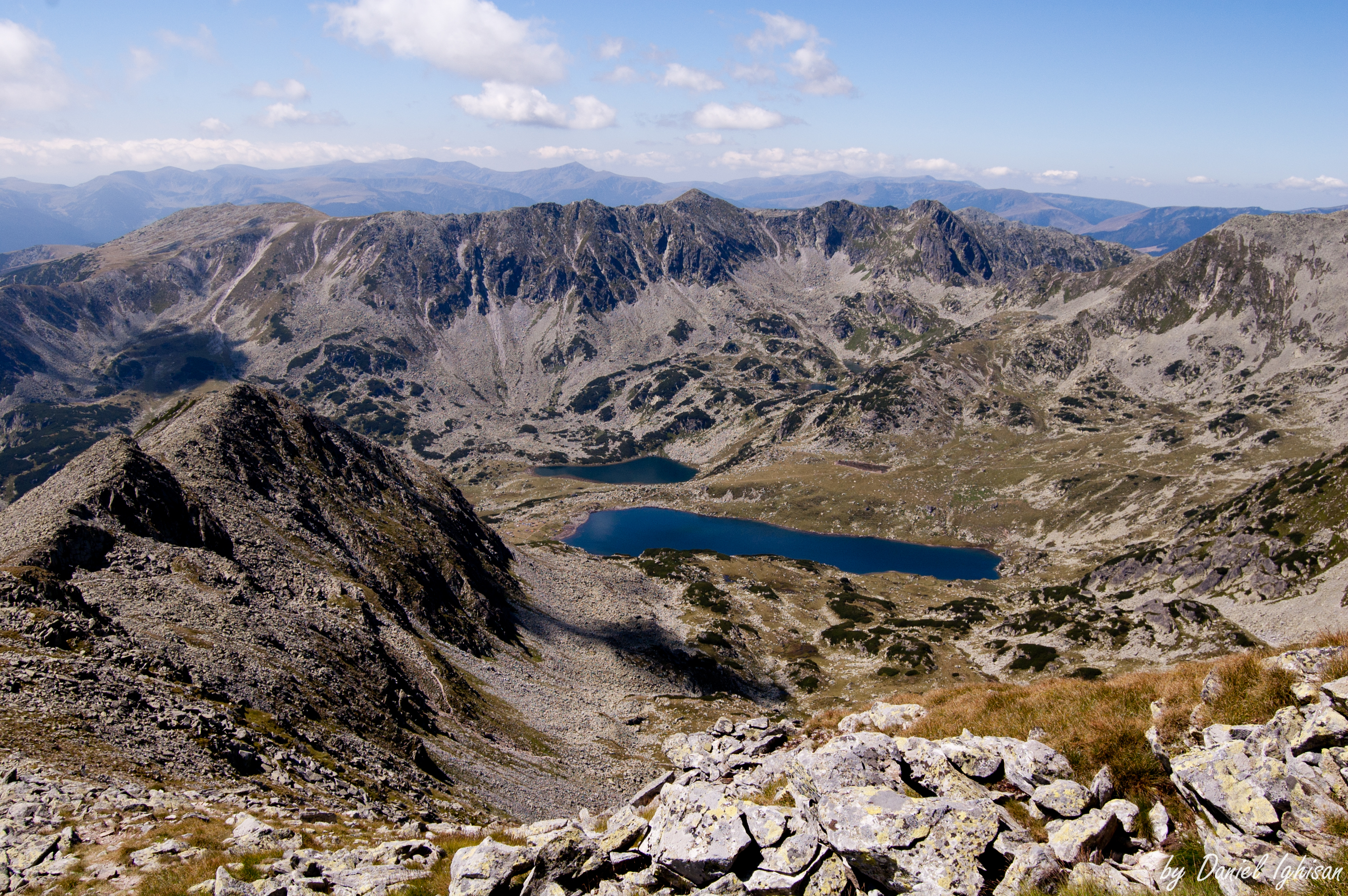
View over Bucura Lake from Peleaga Peak

== Geography ==
The Retezat Mountains have many glacial lakes, including the largest glacial lake in Romania, Bucura Lake (Lacul Bucura), which covers 8.9 hectares (22 acres) and is situated at an altitude of 2,030 metres (6,660 ft). The area also contains the Retezat National Park, Romania's first national park.

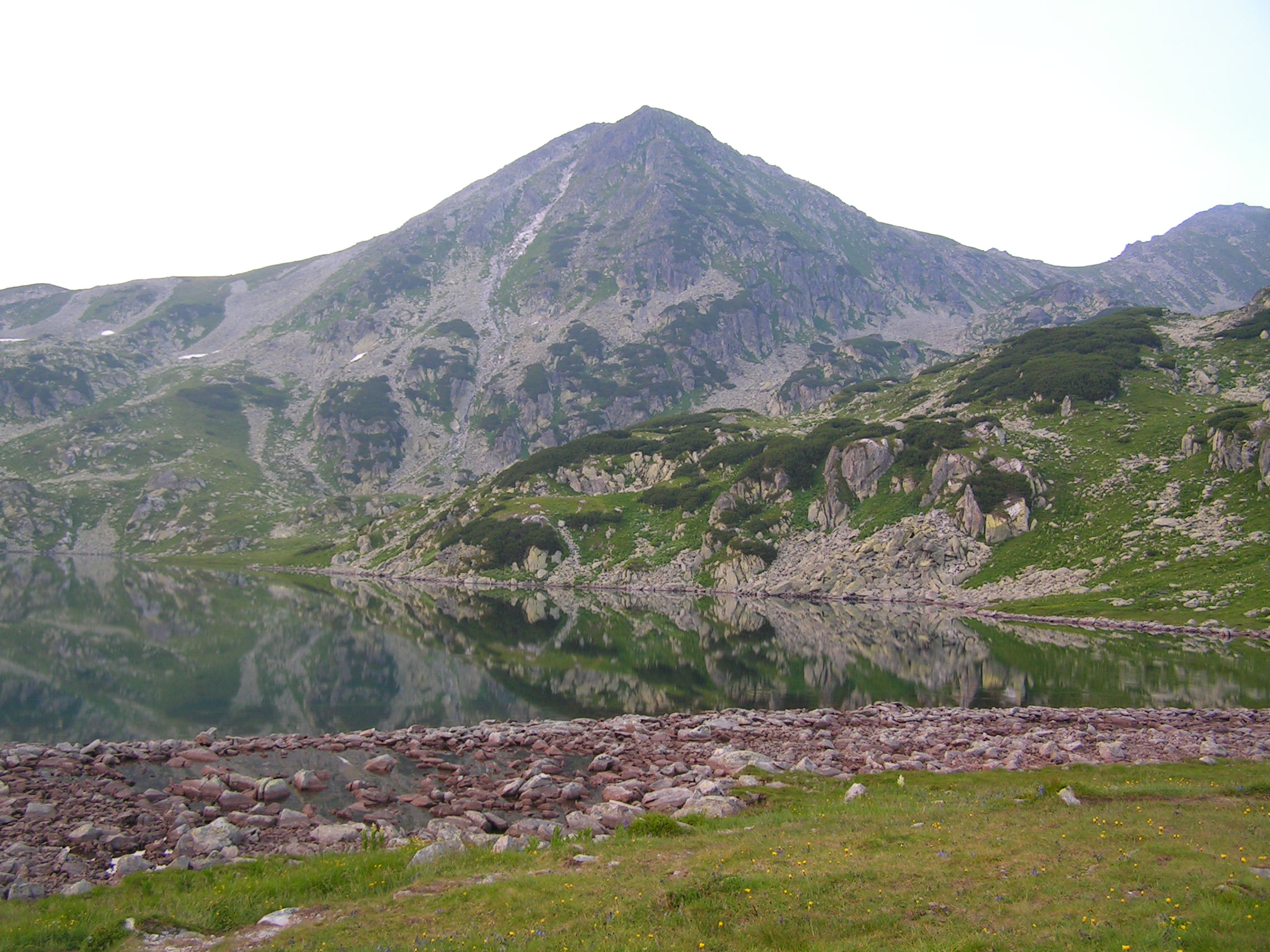
Bucura Lake, the largest glacial lake in Romania

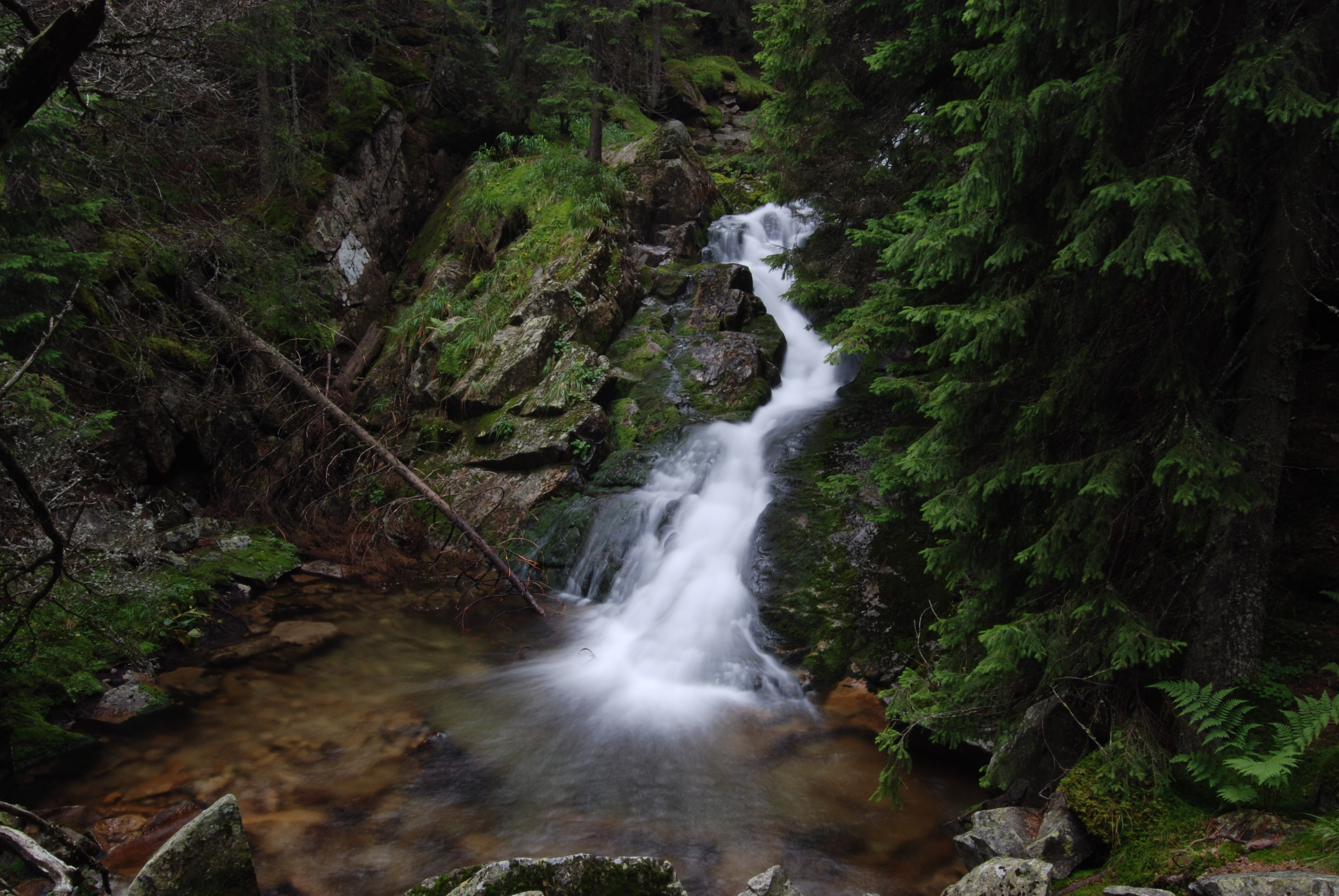
A waterfall on the Stânișoara stream

== River systems and lakes ==
The tectonic, lithologic and morphologic conditions present in the Retezat Mountains, correlated with the orientation of the ridges towards the main air masses make this mountain group the most humid area in the Romanian Carpathians. The hydrologic network is divided into two main directions: north, towards the river Strei (the Mureș drainage basin) where all the rivers from the west, north, and north-east areas of the massif are flowing and south, towards the river Jiul de Vest (the Jiu drainage basin). The most important river course is Râul Mare, with an annual average flow of 12.9 cubic metres per second (460 cu ft/s). Waterfalls are present on all water courses in the park.

One of the specific features of the Retezat Mountains is the widespread presence of glacial lakes. Approximately 38% of the glacier lakes of Romania are found here, on the bottom of calderas, grouped in lake clusters or isolated, and are one of the biggest tourist attraction of the park. Within the massif limits, there are 58 permanent glacier lakes, between 1,700 and 2,300 metres (5,600 and 7,500 ft). Some sources mention over 80 lakes, but here are most likely included the temporary ones as well.

The surface of the lakes varies between 300 square metres (3,200 sq ft) (Stânișoara I) and 88,612 square metres (953,810 sq ft) (Bucura), the largest glacier lake in Romania. The depth of the lakes varies between 0.3 metres (1 ft 0 in) (Stânișoara I) and 29 metres (95 ft) (Zănoaga), while the volume is between 90.3 cubic metres (3,190 cu ft) (Galeșul II) and 693.152 cubic metres (24,478.4 cu ft) (Zănoaga).

== Flora ==
Of the approximately 3,500 plant species that are found in Romania, over a third (about 1,200) can be found here. This is mainly the reason why this area was declared a National park. There are over 90 plant species that are endemic to this area, the first one being discovered in 1858: Flămânzica (Draba dorneri).

The alpine meadows are particularly important, as here are found most of the alpine species, such as members of the genera Gentiana, Potentilla, and Pulsatilla. The edelweiss can also be found here. At the limits between the rocky area and the alpine fields, species of rhododendron (Rhododendron kotschii) can be found. The mountain pine, a protected species in Romania, can be found on all the steep slopes of the Retezat mountains, while the Swiss pine (Pinus cembra) has a wider distribution than in any other Romanian massif.

Other species that can be found here are: hawkweed (Hieracium borzae and Hieracium nigrilacus), members of the genus Centaurea (Centaurea pseudophrygia ratezatensis, an endemic species), cat's ear (Hypochaeris maculata), an endemic species of locoweed (Oxytropis jacquinii retezatensis), and Gentiana lutea (ro. Ghințura galbenă). On the calcareous areas of the Small Retezat, a lot of rare or endemic species can be found, like Barbarea lepuznica (a species of the winter cress genus) or Pedicularis baumgarteni, a species of the genus Pedicularis.

The biggest threat for the park's flora (especially the one found on the alpine fields), is overgrazing, as there are numerous herds of sheep. The species specific to this area are replaced by less fragile ones.

== Fauna ==
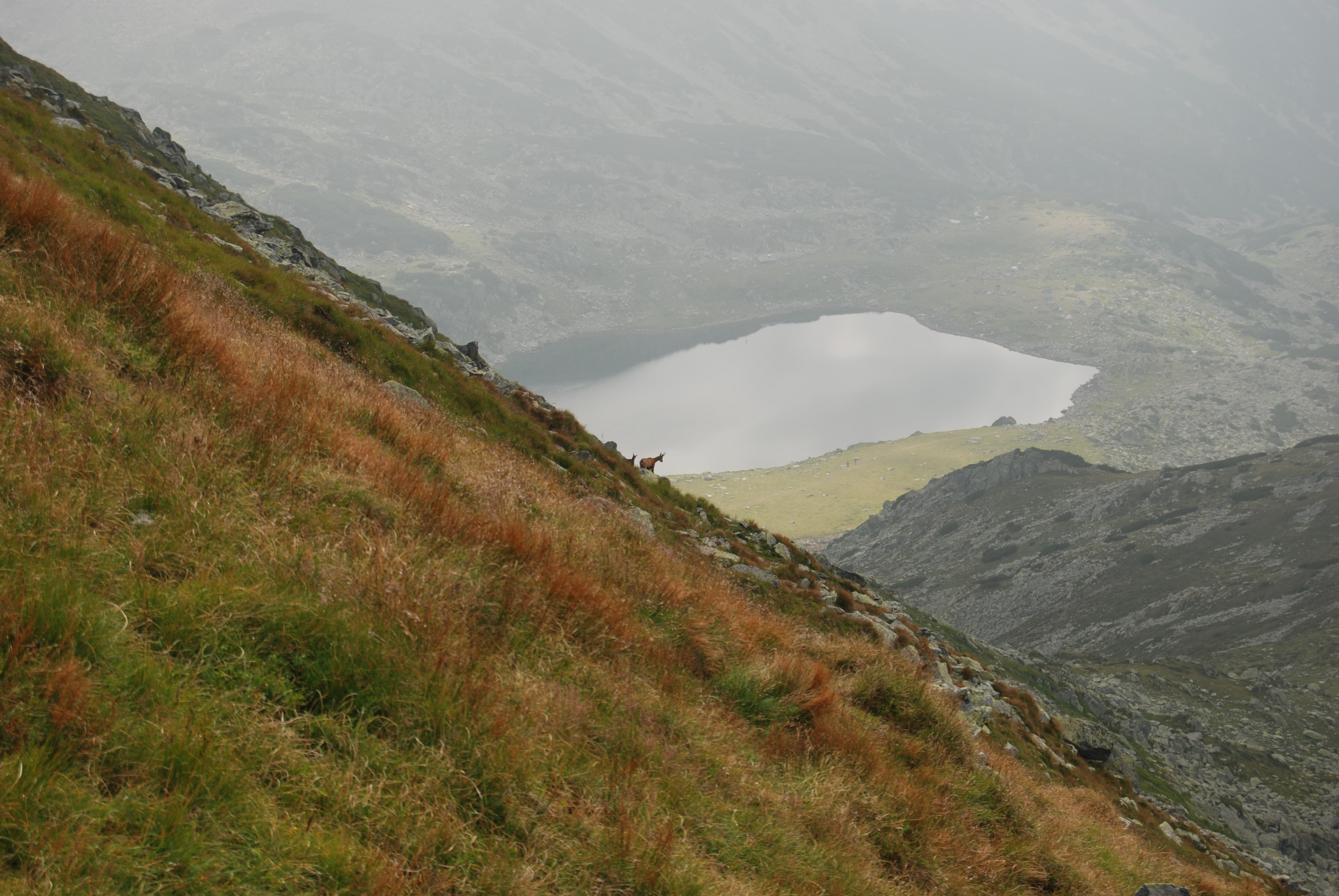
A small group of chamois with Bucura Lake in the background.

Over 185 species of birds, more than half of the species that can be found in Romania, visit the park. Out of these, over 122 species nest here. Rare birds, such as the golden eagle, (also represented on the park logo), lesser spotted eagle, short-toed eagle, peregrine falcon, western capercaillie, Eurasian eagle-owl, Eurasian pygmy-owl, and the black stork reside here.

There are 55 species of mammals within the park range. There are favorable conditions here for some of Europe's biggest predators to survive: the gray wolf, brown bear and the Eurasian lynx; some big herbivores like the chamois, red deer, and the roe deer, while small carnivores such as the wildcat and the European otter can also be found.

In 1973, 20 alpine marmots, brought from the Austrian Alps, were introduced in the park and released in the Gemenele glacier lake caldera. Nowadays they are found all over the park, but the impact that this nonindigenous species had on other plants or animals is yet unknown. Also, after 1960, the brown trout was introduced in some of the park lakes. Studies are now being performed to check if they are responsible for the decline in amphibian population through these lakes, observed during the last years.

A subspecies of the smooth newt (L. vulgaris ampelensis), endemic to the Carpathian Mountains, lives here, while the European common frog can be found all over the park. Although very few common European viper bites were reported, tourists and villagers often kill them on sight. There are several endemic invertebrate species found here: nine endemic species of butterflies, at least six species belonging to the Plecoptera order, and four belonging to the Trichoptera order.

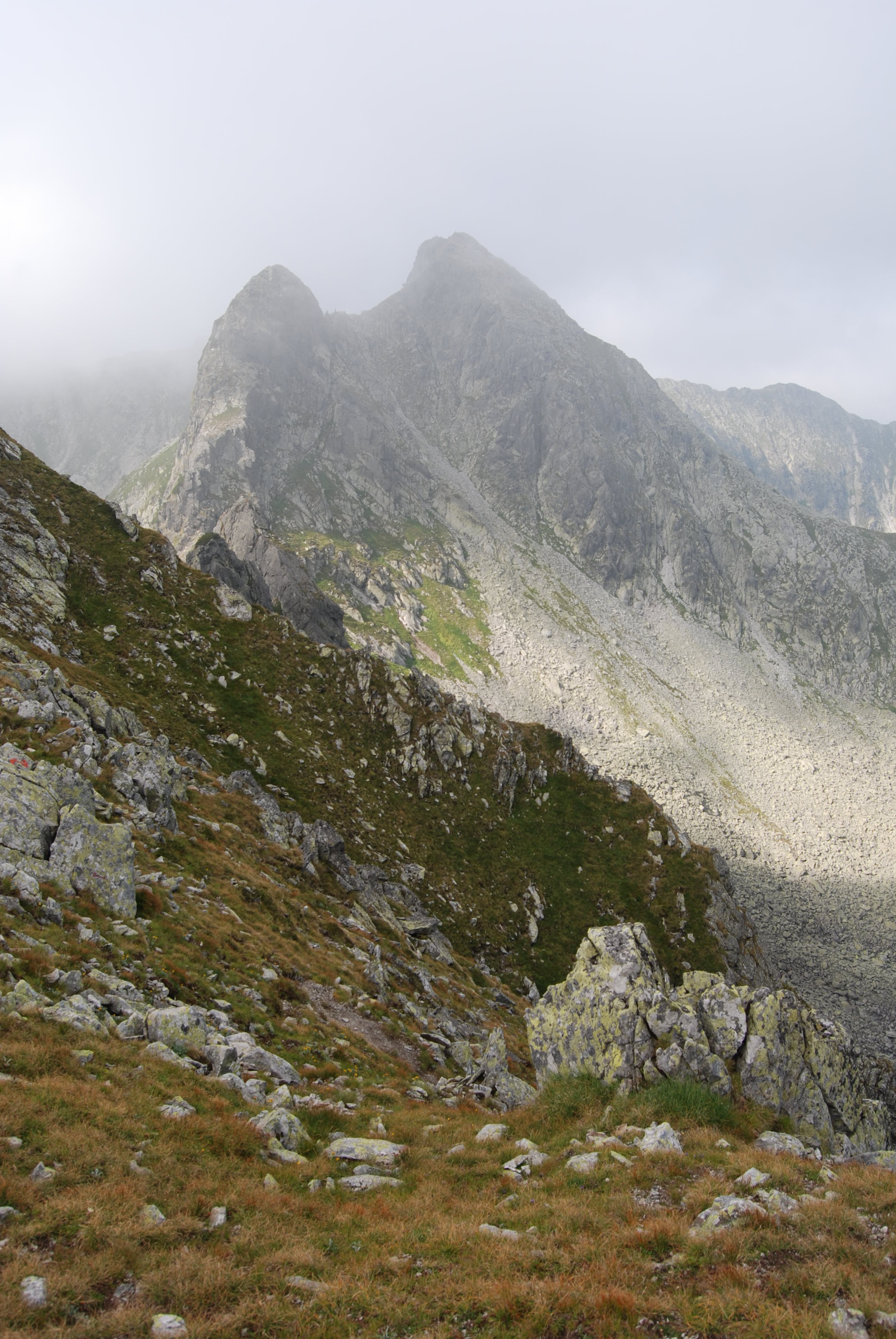
Judele Peak seen from the Retezat Peak, across the Gemenele–Tău Negru Reservation

== Access ==
=== South Retezat Region ===
The southern approaches to the Retezat Mountains extend from the Jiu Valley city of Vulcan on the east end of the valley to Câmpușel on the west end of the valley. Although there are several points of entry into the Retezat Mountains from the towns of Vulcan, Lupeni, Uricani, Câmpul lui Neag, and points in between, direct access to the National Park begins in the Cheile Buții area (approximately 35 kilometres (22 mi) west of Petroșani) and extends west to Câmpușel.

=== North Retezat Region ===
The Retezat Mountains and the Retezat National Park are accessible from the north by way of Romania's National Road DN66 and/or by way of train, which runs alongside Route 66, from Petroșani to the southeast or Simeria to the north. From Route 66, there are several gateways into the Retezat Mountains. Almost all the villages along the highway, from Ohaba de sub Piatră, just outside Hațeg, to Merișor, just outside Petroșani, have access roads that run south into the Retezat Mountains.

== Highest peaks ==
The Retezat Massif peaks with an elevation of over 2,300 m (7,500 ft) are:

- Peleaga 2,509 m
- Păpușa 2,508 m
- Retezat 2,482 m
- Mare 2,463 m
- Custura 2,457 m
- Bucura 2,433 m
- Sântămaria 2,400 m
- Judele 2,398 m
- Bucura II 2,372 m
- Țapu 2,372 m
- Custura Bucurei 2,370 m
- Păpușa Mică 2,370 m
- Bârlea 2,348 m
- Slăveiu 2,347 m
- Obârșia Nucșoarei 2,346 m
- Morii 2,340 m
- Ciumfu Mare 2,335 m
- Șesele Mari 2,324 m
- Valea Rea 2,311 m

== Image gallery ==
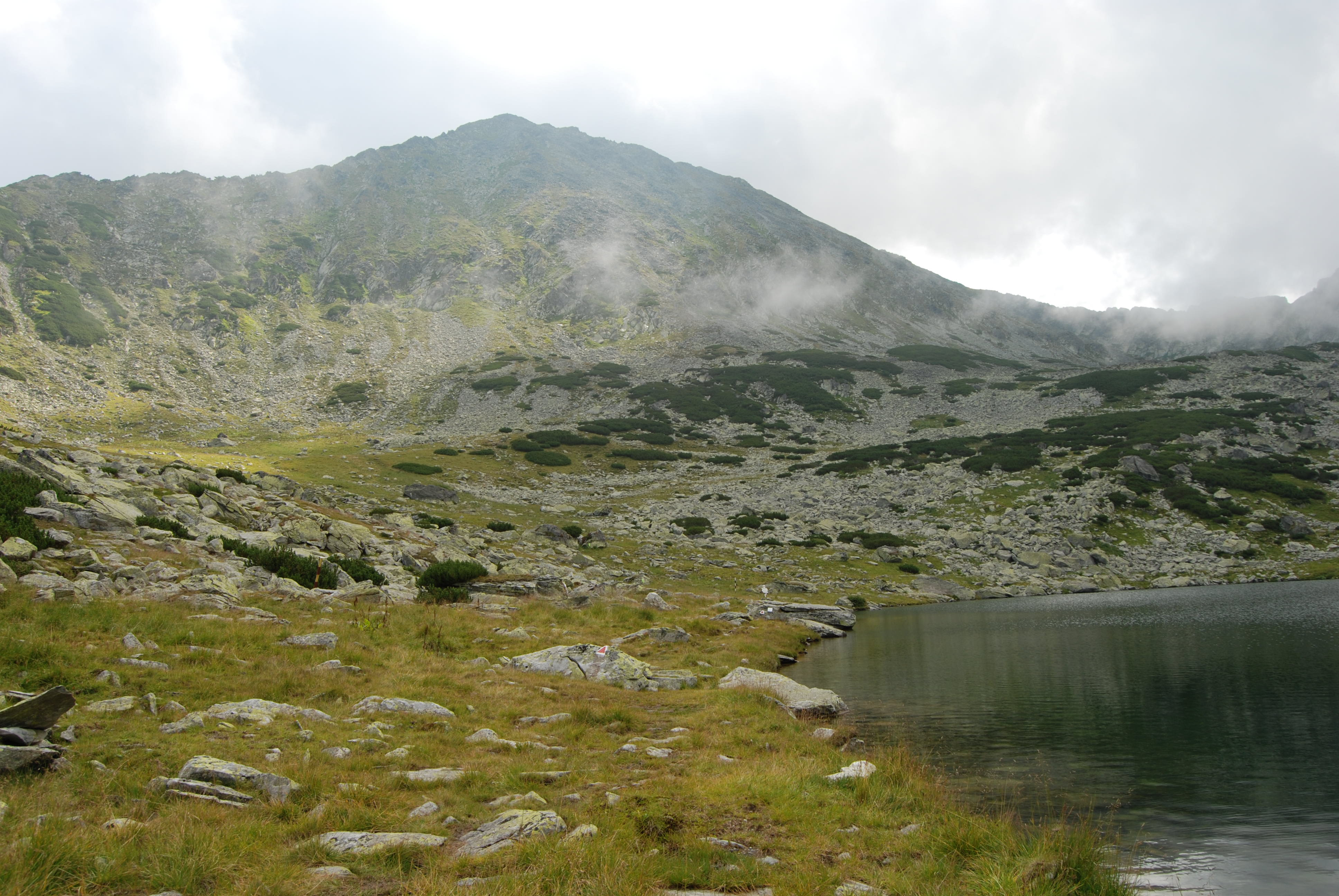
Vârful Mare seen from the Galeșu Lake.

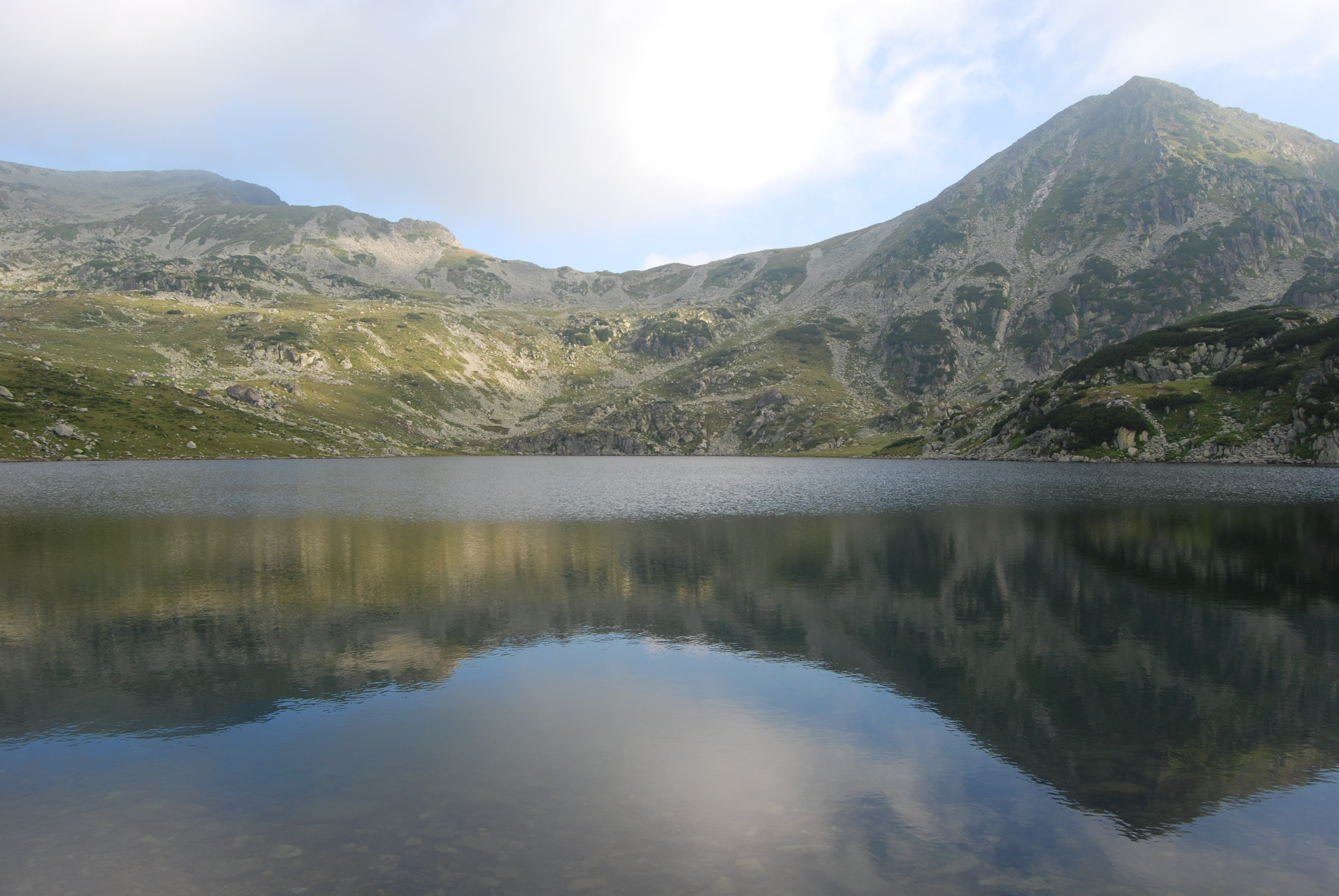
Bucura Lake view from the camping site.

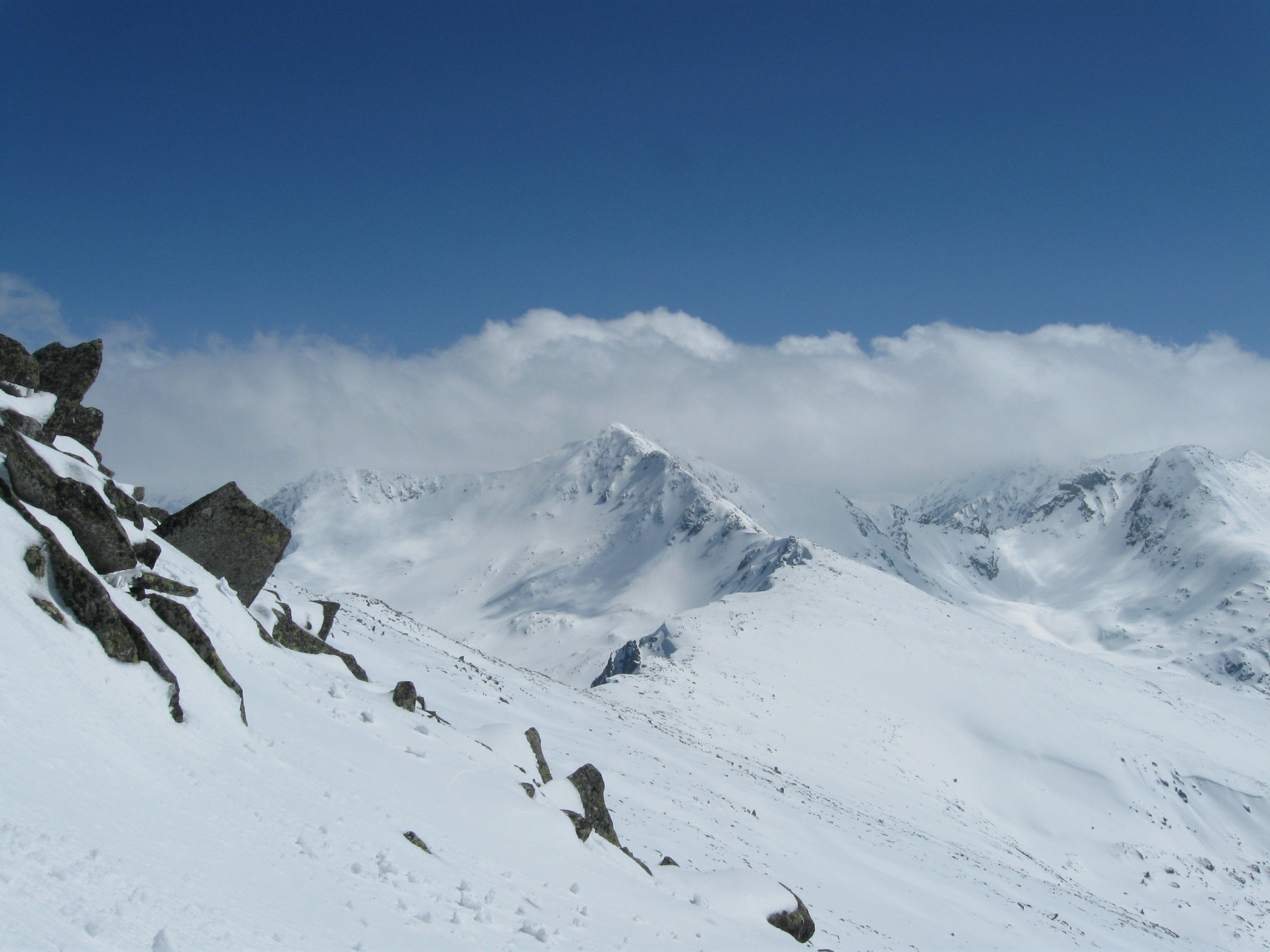
Bucura Peak as seen during spring from the Retezat Peak.

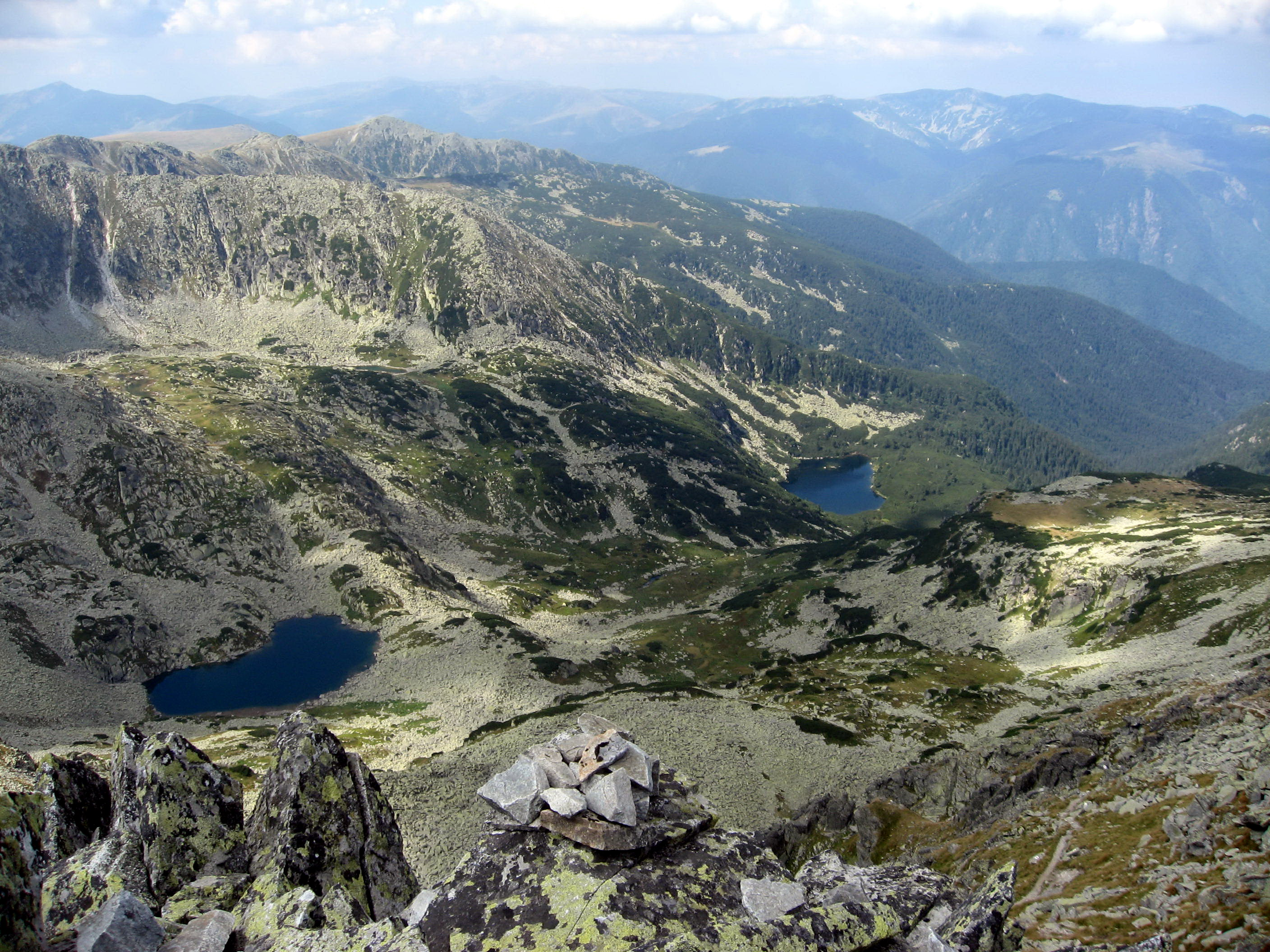
Glacial lakes in the Retezat Mountains

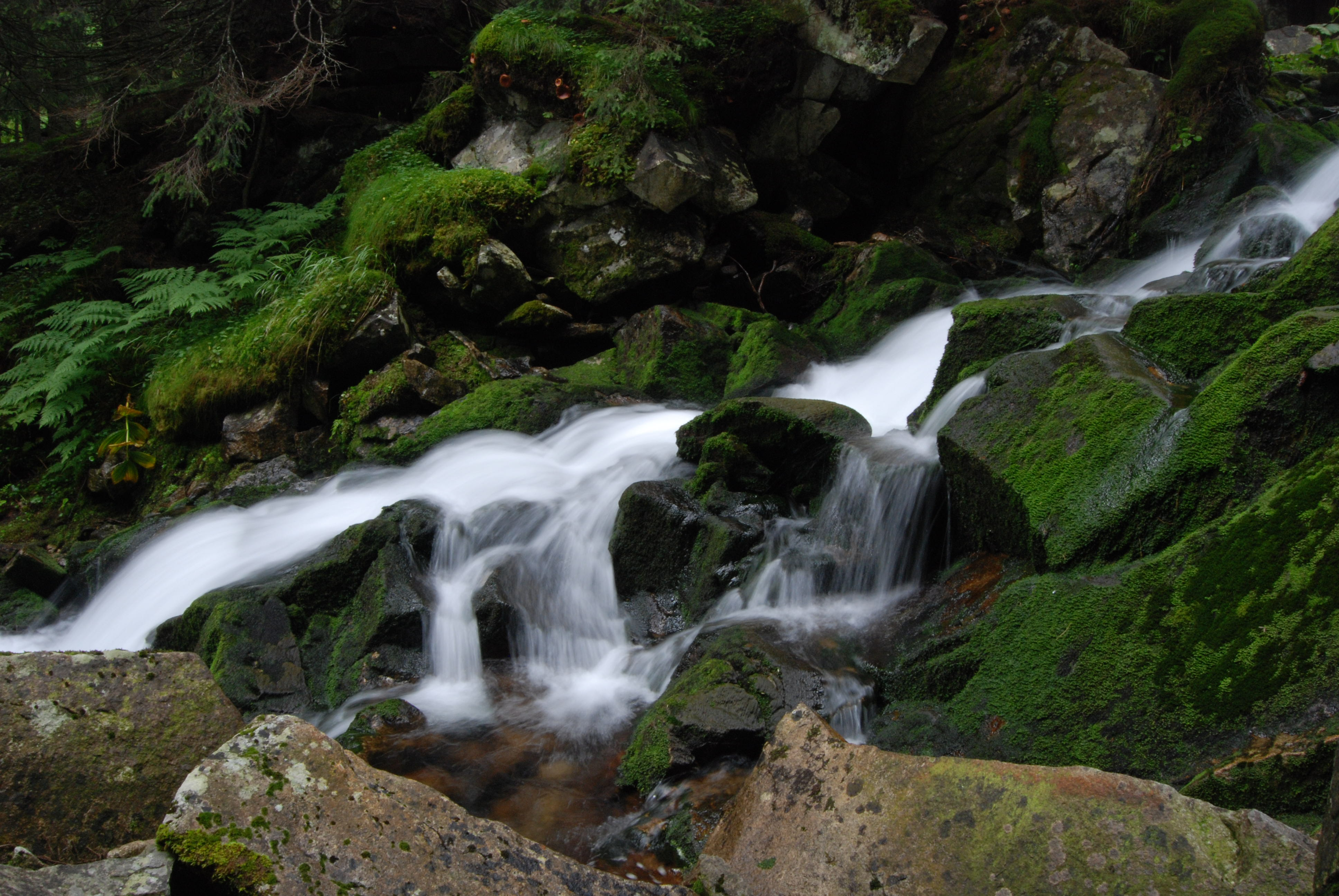
A small waterfall on the Stânișoara stream.

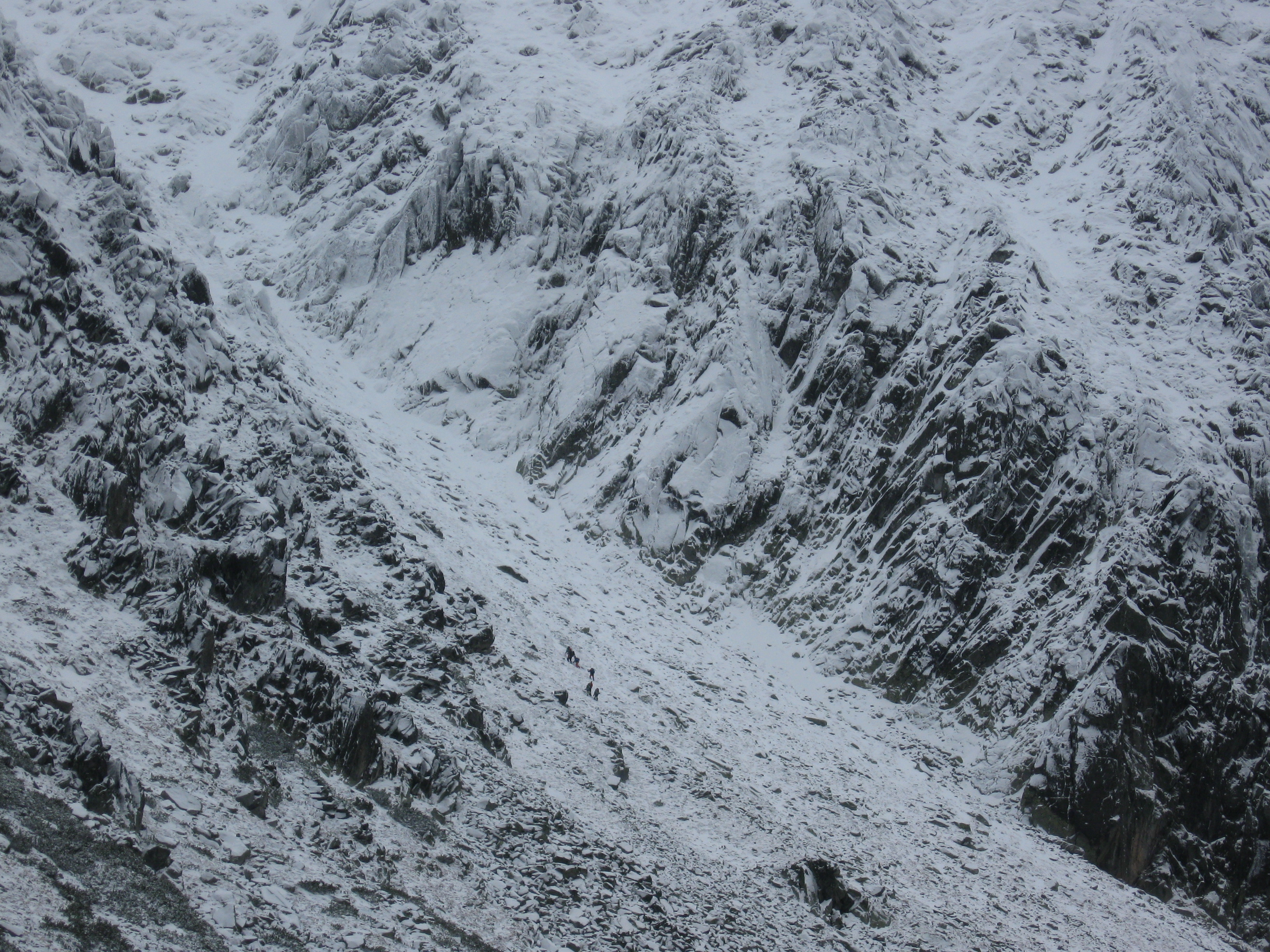
Hikers going up the north face of the Retezat Peak.

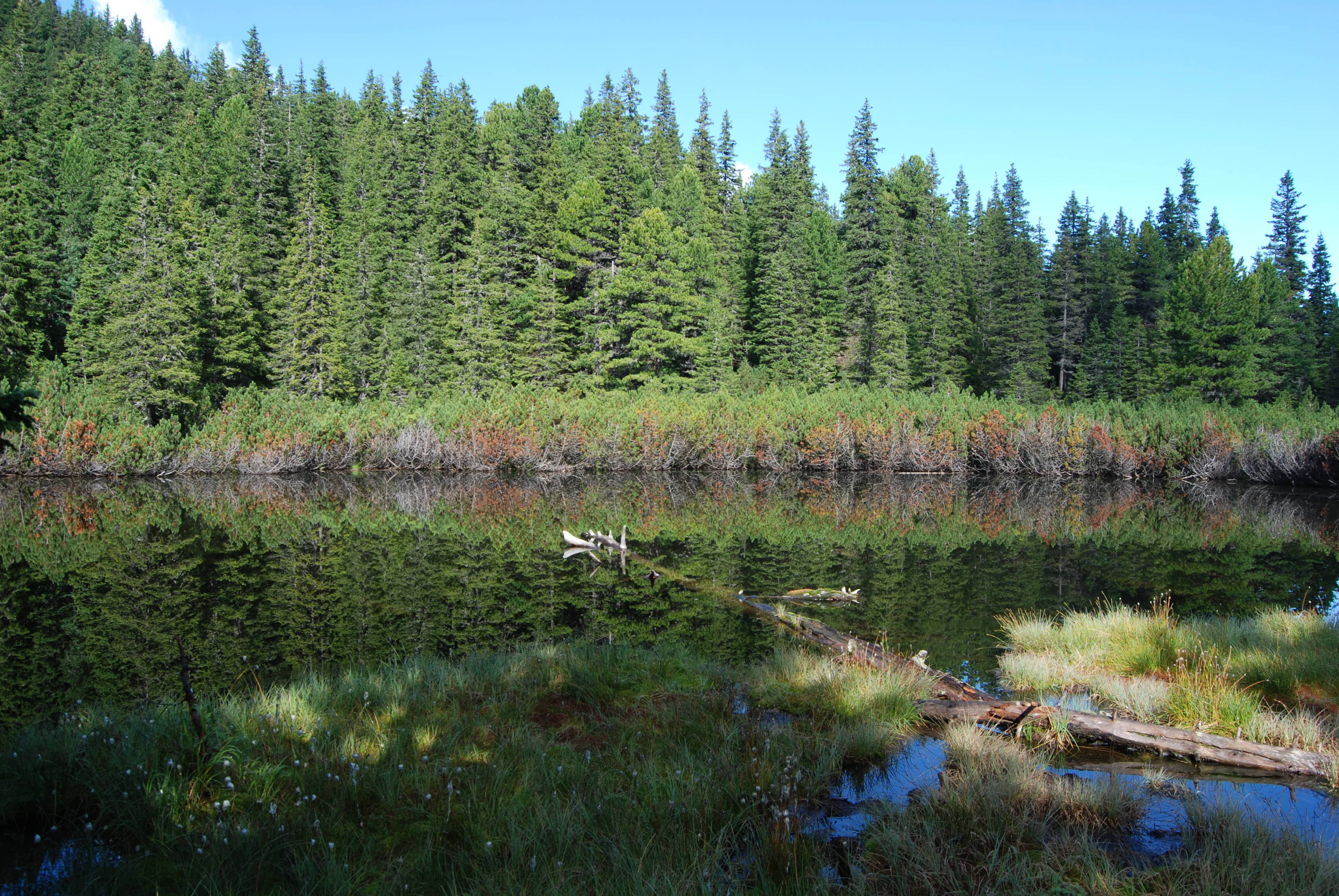
The Pond Between the Firs (Tăul dintre brazi), a small non-glacial lake inside the national park.

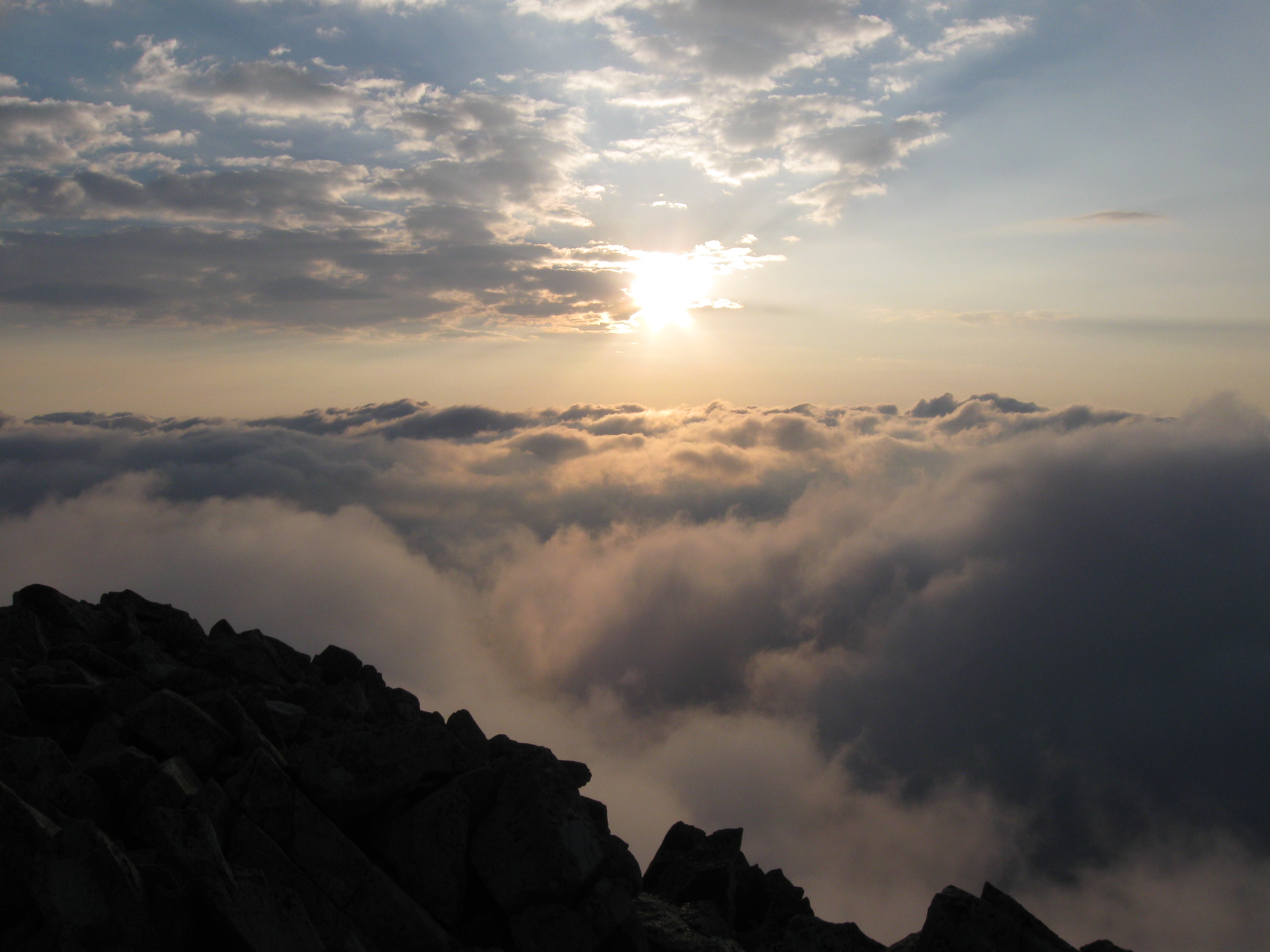
Sunset view from the Retezat Peak.

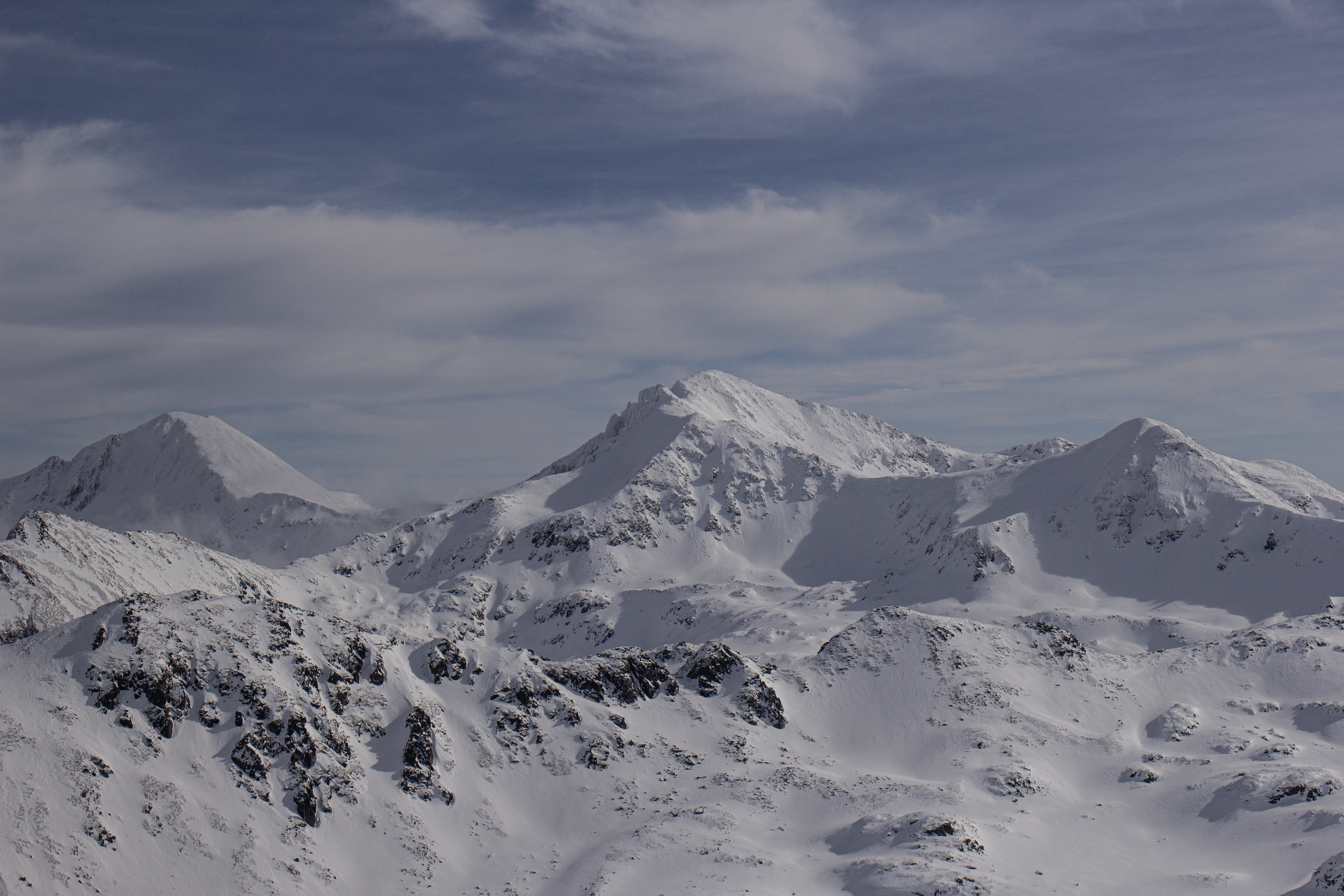
The Peleaga, Bucura, and Păpușa peaks
