= Jiul de Vest =

Jiul de Vest Jiul Românesc, Câmpușelu
- Location within Romania

Location
- Country: Romania
- Counties: Hunedoara County
- Villages: Câmpu lui Neag, Uricani, Lupeni, Vulcan

Physical characteristics
- Source: Godeanu Mountains
  - location: near the Jiu-Cerna Pass
  - coordinates: 45.2769°N 22.8230°E
- Mouth: Jiu
  - location: Iscroni
  - coordinates: 45°22′07″N 23°22′04″E
  - elevation: 554 m (1,818 ft)
- Length: 54 km (34 mi)
- Basin size: 496 km^{2} (192 sq mi)

Basin features
- Progression: Jiu→ Danube→ Black Sea

The Jiul de Vest ("Western Jiu", previously also known as Jiul Românesc) is a headwater of the river Jiu in Romania. At its confluence with the Jiul de Est in Iscroni, the Jiu is formed. Its length is 54 km (34 mi) and its basin size is 496 km^{2} (192 sq mi). The upper course of the river is also known locally as Câmpușelu.

Jiul simply means "the Jiu", appended by the definite article -l.

== Tributaries ==
The following rivers are tributaries to the river Jiul de Vest (from source to mouth):

- Left: Iarului, Scorota, Scocu Urzicaru, Pleșa, Buta, Lazăr, Valea Ursească, Toplița, Pilug, Valea de Brazi, Furu, Valea Șerpilor, Sterminos, Mierleasa, Crevedia, Aninoasa
- Right: Șarba, Știrbu, Ursu, Jidanu, Pârâul Rece, Pârâul lui Stan, Valea Boului, Gârbov, Rostovanu, Strugu, Valea de Pești, Pietroasa, Valea Arsă, Pârâul Seciului, Balomir, Tușul, Braia, De La Hagher, Sohodol, Baleia, Pârâul Mare, Merișoara, Valea Ungurului, Pârâul Pinului
