= Balomir (river) =

- Location within Romania

Location
- Country: Romania
- Counties: Hunedoara County

Physical characteristics
- Mouth: Jiul de Vest
  - location: Uricani
  - coordinates: 45.3340°N 23.1318°E
- Length: 9 km (5.6 mi)
- Basin size: 16 km^{2} (6.2 sq mi)

Basin features
- Progression: Jiul de Vest→ Jiu→ Danube→ Black Sea
- Tributaries
  - right: Zănoaga, Balomiraș

The Balomir is a right tributary of the river Jiul de Vest in Romania. It discharges into the Jiul de Vest in Uricani. Its length is 9 km (5.6 mi) and its basin size is 16 km^{2} (6.2 sq mi).
