= SS Noemijulia =

Cargo ship

History
- Name: Barlby (1895–1926); Noemi (1926–30); Noemijulia (1930–41); Irish Hazel (1941–43); Empire Don (1943–45); Irish Hazel (1945–49); Uman (1946–60)
- Owner: R Ropner & Co Ltd (1895–1916); Sir R Ropner & Co Ltd (1916–19); Ropner Shipping Co Ltd (1919–26); D A Mango (1926–30); Noemijulia Steamship Co Ltd (1930–40); Compagnia Maritime Panama Ultramar(1940–41); Irish Shipping Ltd (1941–43); Ministry of War Transport (1943–45); Irish Shipping Ltd (1945–49); Turk Silepcilik Limitet Sirketi (1949–60)
- Operator: As for owners, except the following: W G Walton Ltd (1930–33); S Catsell Ltd (1933–41); Stanhope Steamship Co Ltd (1943–45); Wexford Steamship Co Ltd (1945–49)
- Port of registry: (United Kingdom of Great Britain and Ireland) West Hartlepool, UK (1895–1926); Piraeus, Greece (1926–30); (United Kingdom) London (1930–40); Panama City, Panama (1940–41); (Republic of Ireland) Dublin, Ireland (1941–43); (United Kingdom) London (1943–45); (Republic of Ireland) Dublin (1945–49); Istanbul, Turkey (1949–60)
- Builder: Ropner & Son Ltd (Stockton-on-Tees, England)
- Yard number: 312
- Launched: 4 October 1895
- Completed: November 1895
- Out of service: 6 January 1960
- Identification: United Kingdom Official Number 99728 (1895–1926, 1930–40, 1943–45); Code Letters JGMC (1926–30); Code Letters GSJD (1930–40); Code Letters GCGT (1943–45)
- Fate: Wrecked

General characteristics
- Type: Cargo ship
- Tonnage: 2,489 GRT (1895–1943); 2,553 GRT (1943–60); 1,559 NRT; 3,750 DWT
- Length: 290 ft (88.39 m)
- Beam: 47 ft 1 in (14.35 m)
- Depth: 16 ft 6 in (5.03 m)
- Propulsion: Triple expansion steam engine
- Speed: 8 knots (15 km/h)

Approximate location where Uman ran aground off Turkey.

Noemijulia was a 2,489 GRT cargo ship built in 1895 as Barlby by Sir R Ropner & Sons Ltd, Stockton-on-Tees, County Durham, England, for their own use. She was sold to Greece in 1926 and renamed Noemi. In 1930, she was sold to a British company and renamed Noemijulia. Questions about the manner of her operation were raised in the British Parliament in 1935, and she was attacked by Spanish Nationalist aircraft in 1937 off Cape de Creus.

In 1940, she was sold to Panama, followed by a sale to Ireland in 1941 and renaming to Irish Hazel. She was requisitioned in 1943 by the British Ministry of War Transport (MoWT) and renamed Empire Don, In 1945, she was returned to her previous owners and renamed Irish Hazel. Sold in 1949 and renamed Uman, she served until 1960 when she ran aground and was wrecked.

== Construction and design ==
Noemijulia, originally named Barlby, was built in 1895 by Ropner & Son Ltd, Stockton-on-Tees, County Durham. Barlby was built for R Ropner & Co Ltd, West Hartlepool. Yard number 312, she was launched on 4 October 1895 and completed in November. The United Kingdom Official Number 99728 was allocated.

Barlby was 290 feet 0 inches (88.39 m) long, with a beam of 48 feet 0 inches (14.63 m). She had a depth of 16 feet 6 inches (5.03 m) and a draught of 19 feet 2 inches (5.84 m). As built, she was assessed at 2,489 GRT, 1,559 NRT. Her DWT was 3,750. The vessel was propelled by a 224 nhp triple expansion steam engine, which had cylinders of 22 1/2 inches (57 cm), 43 1/2 inches (110 cm) and 73 inches (190 cm) diameter by 48 inches (120 cm) stroke. The engine was built by Blair & Co. Ltd. of Stockton on Tees. It drove a screw propeller and could propel the ship at 8 knots (15 km/h).

== Service history ==
=== Early history ===
On 8 October 1924, Barlby departed from Dakar, Senegal for Bordeaux, France. A week after departure, the entire crew of Barlby were struck down by malaria. The British steamship Boonah rendezvoused with her at 18°05′N 18°52′W and placed a crew on board in order to return her to Dakar. In 1926, Barlby was sold to D A Mango, Piraeus, Greece and renamed Noemi. The Code Letters JGMC were allocated.

In 1930, Noemi was sold to the Noemijulia Steamship Co Ltd, London and renamed Noemijulia. She was operated under the management of W G Walton Ltd, London. Her port of registry was London. She regained her Official Number 99728 and the Code Letters GSJD were allocated. In 1935, management passed to S Catsell Ltd.

In July 1935, questions were asked in Parliament by Vice-Admiral Campbell as to the number of British subjects working on board Noemijulia and their rates of pay. In reply, the President of the Board of Trade, Leslie Burgin replied that there was only one British subject on board the ship, and he was paid £7 per month. The ship had not visited the United Kingdom since her transfer from the Greek to the British Flag in 1930, and had not been inspected since 1930. On 16 October, Noemijulia ran aground in the Danube at Brăila, Romania. She was refloated on 18 October. On 16 November 1935, she ran aground in the Brăiţa River, Romania, some 45 nautical miles (83 km) from the mouth of the river. She was refloated on 18 November and sailed to Sulina for inspection.

In November 1935, the operation of Noemijulia was again raised in Parliament. George Oliver asked whether the Board of Trade was aware that Noemijulia's radio installation was defective, and what measures were being taken to correct this. Leslie Burgin replied that the Board was aware, and had requested that the ship be detained should she visit certain countries which had adopted the 1929 Safety Convention, but so far she had not docked at any port belonging to one of the signatories. In January 1936, Noemijulia arrived at Antwerp, Belgium, where she was detained. She was still detained in March as the defects in her radio and other defects had not been remedied.

=== Spanish Civil War ===
On 23 August 1937, during the Spanish Civil War, Noemijulia was on a voyage from Marseille, Bouches-du-Rhône, France to Barcelona, Spain when she was bombed by two Spanish Nationalist aircraft, coded ME 528 and ME 529, some 15 nautical miles (28 km) off Cape de Creus (42°07′N 3°32′E). Both bombs missed, and Noemijulia proceeded to Port-Vendres, Pyrénées-Orientales, France, escorted by the Saphir-class submarine Diamant, which had answered her SOS. This was the second attack on a British ship that month, following the attack on British Corporal on 6 August. On 2 January 1938, Noemijulia rescued the crew of the French schooner La Bougeotte, which had sunk on 31 December 1937. They were landed in Marseille. On 15 August 1938, Noemijulia was in port at Valencia, Spain when she was caught in an air raid and bombed. The bomb landed 14 feet from the bow on her port side, leaving "about 50 holes."

=== World War II ===
Noemijulia was sold in 1939 to the Compagnia Maritima de Panama Ultrama, Panama City, Panama, remaining under Catsell's management. On 19 September 1939 she delivered 1,130 Jewish refugees from Europe into Haifa, Mandatory Palestine, one of many ships delivering Jews into Palestine in defiance of the 1939 White Paper. The ship was boarded and the immigrants detained by the Palestine Police Force under threat of deportation. After one month in detention, the refugees were released.

Noemijulia was a member of Convoy HG 32, which departed from Gibraltar on 31 May 1940 and arrived at Liverpool, Lancashire on 10 June. She was bound for Sharpness, Gloucestershire. On 17 June 1941, Noemijulia was sold to Irish Shipping Ltd, Dublin, Ireland for £67,500 and renamed Irish Hazel. She was originally being offered for sale as scrap, with the Hammond Lane Foundry, Dublin as prospective buyers. She was described as "fit for nothing but the scrap yard", and needed extensive repairs. Seventy percent of the ship was condemned. This included all decks. On 29 October 1941, the subject of the purchase of Irish Hazel was raised in the Dáil Éireann by James Hickey, who asked specific questions as to the purchase cost, state and operational costs of the ship. In reply, Minister for Supplies Seán Lemass stated that he would not answer specific questions such as those posed, but that the purchase price of the ship took into account her condition and the cost of the necessary repairs.

Due to a lack of steel in Dublin, and the MoWTs refusal to release the steel to a Dublin shipyard, it was decided to send Irish Hazel to the United Kingdom for the repairs to be carried out. She departed from Dublin on 13 January 1942 for the yard of C H Bailey, Newport, Monmouthshire. Bailey's were to repair her on an "as and when" basis. The ship was almost completely rebuilt, with 610 long tons (620 t) of new steel needed.

Irish Hazel was requisitioned by the MoWT on 17 November 1943 whilst under repair at Newport, Monmouthshire and renamed Empire Don. The requisitioning was partly offset by the granting of a warrant that allowed Irish Shipping Ltd to operate the Italian steamer Caterina Gerolimich. She had been trapped in Dublin port since the outbreak of the war. She was purchased by Irish Shipping Ltd. following the Armistice between Italy and Allied armed forces and renamed Irish Cedar. She sailed under the Irish flag on 26 October 1943. The Empire Don's port of registry was London and the Code Letters GCGT were allocated. She was operated under the management of the Stanhope Steamship Co Ltd. Little is known of her wartime service. Empire Don was a member of Convoy EN 423, which departed from Methil, Fife on 17 August 1944 and arrived at Loch Ewe three days later. She was also a member of Convoy FN 1489, which departed from Southend, Essex on 23 September and arrived at Methil two days later. She is recorded as having departed from Falmouth, Cornwall on 3 December 1944 and arriving at Gibraltar a week later. On 18 May 1945, she departed from Genoa, Italy under escort, arriving at Livorno the next day.

=== Postwar service ===
On 5 September 1945, Empire Don was returned to Irish Shipping Ltd and regained her former name Irish Hazel. She was operated under the management of the Wexford Steamship Co Ltd.

Irish Hazel was sold on 17 May 1949 to Turk Silepcilik Limitet Sirketi, Istanbul, Turkey and renamed Uman. She served until 6 January 1960, when she ran aground in the Black Sea at Kefken Point, Turkey whilst on a voyage from Zonguldak to Istanbul. She was declared a total loss.
