= Uricani =

- Town
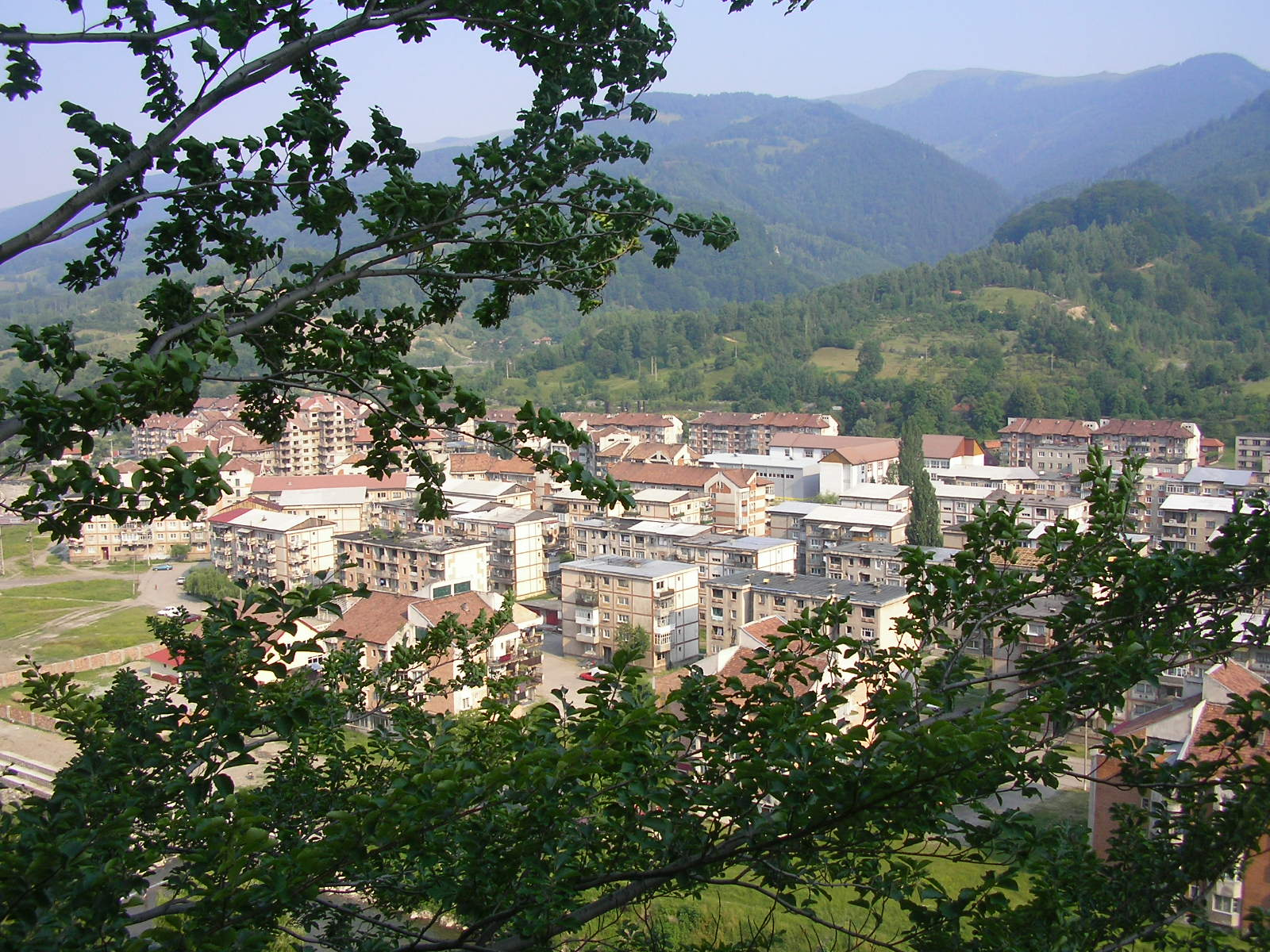

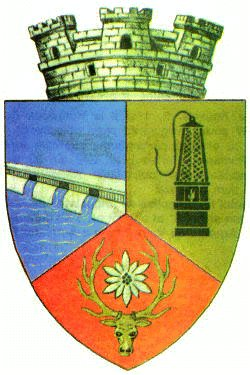
- Coat of arms

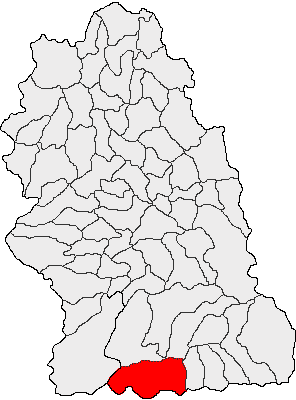
- Location in Hunedoara County

- Location in Romania
- Coordinates: 45°20′11″N 23°9′9″E
- Country: Romania
- County: Hunedoara
- Area: 251.41 km^{2} (97.07 sq mi)
- Elevation: 722 m (2,369 ft)
- Population (2021-12-01): 6,669
  - Density: 26.53/km^{2} (68.70/sq mi)
- Time zone: UTC+02:00 (EET)
  - Summer (DST): UTC+03:00 (EEST)
- Postal code: 336100
- Area code: (+40) 02 54
- Vehicle reg.: HD
- Website: www.uricani.ro

Uricani (Romanian pronunciation: [uriˈkanʲ]; Hungarian: Hobicaurikány) is a town in the Jiu Valley region of Hunedoara County, in southern Transylvania, Romania. As of 2021 it had a population of 6,669.

== History ==
Historical population
Year	Pop.	±%
1850	615	—
1966	6,193	+907.0%
1977	7,353	+18.7%
1992	12,835	+74.6%
2002	12,177	−5.1%
2011	8,618	−29.2%
2021	6,669	−22.6%
Source: Census data

Uricani is first mentioned in a certified document dated 1888, when the locality was referred to as Hobicza-Urikány (in Romanian both Hobiceni-Uricani and Uricani-Hobiceni versions were used). The name of Uricani is derived from the union of two villages, Hobița (Hobica, listed in documents from 1473 first as Ohabycza) and Uric (Urik, from 1473 first as Wryk) from Țara Hațegului. After 1920 the locality's name was changed to Uricani. Over time, the village of Câmpu lui Neag functioned as either a separate commune or as a village belonging to Uricani. In 1965, Uricani was declared a city. It administers two villages, Câmpu lui Neag (Kimpulunyág) and Valea de Brazi.

Like the other Jiu Valley cities, Uricani's principal economic activities revolve around the region's coal mines, although the city, like the region, is in a period of transition as the mines have been gradually closed and many of the workers made redundant.

== Location ==
The city location lies on the western side of Jiu Valley and at the foot of the Retezat Mountains, with the geographical coordinates of 23° 10′ meridian, east longitude and 45° 25′ parallel, north latitude. The city is located in Hunedoara County and adjacent to Mehedinți and Gorj counties. It lies at an altitude of 729 m (2,392 ft) on the west side of the Petroșani Depression and along the West Jiu River. Its area also contains the smaller waterways of Lazarul, Valea de Pești, Buta, and Bilugu, as well as the fresh water reservoir which contains the drinking water used throughout Jiu Valley.

Uricani is accessed via the national road DN66A, the 27 km (17 mi) long west branch of the DN66 that connects the cities of Petroșani, Vulcan, Lupeni, and Uricani.

The city covers 25,141 hectares (62,120 acres), the largest geographical area of all the Jiu Valley cities. The city limits are bordered to the east by Cow’s Valley, to the west by Retezat National Park, to the north by peaks of the Retezat Mountains, including Custura, Lazarul 2,282 m (7,487 ft), and Tulisa 1,782 m (5,846 ft), and to the south by peaks of the Vâlcan Mountains, including Coarnele 1,789 m (5,869 ft) and Șiglăul Mare 1,682 m (5,518 ft). The surrounding mountains are part of the Southern Carpathians, in an area sometimes referred to as the Transylvanian Alps.

== See also ==
- Jiu Valley
- ACS Minerul Uricani
- Stadionul Minerul (Uricani)
