= Retezat National Park =

National park in Romania

- Parcul Național Retezat
- IUCN category II (national park)
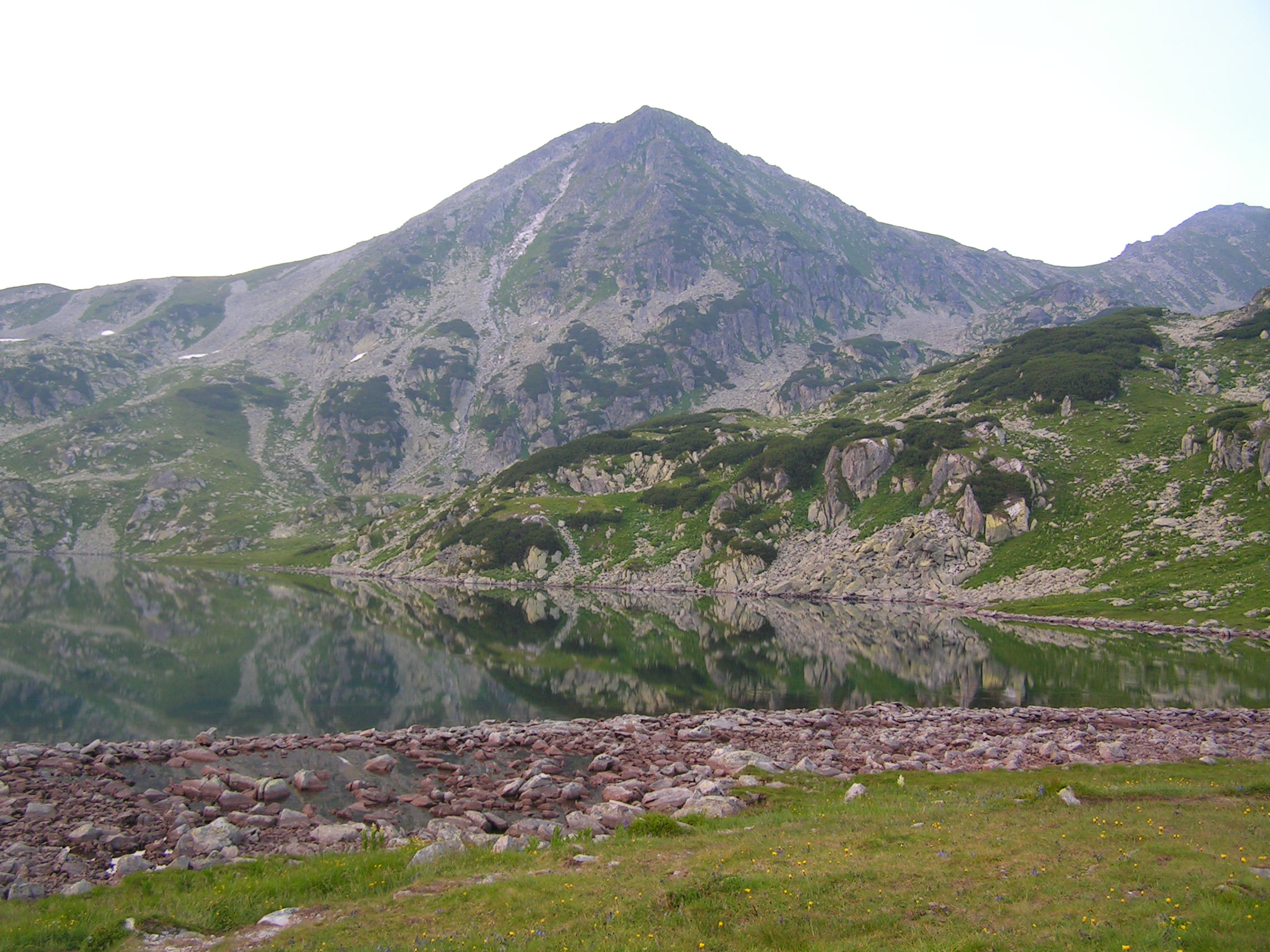
- Retezat Mountains, near camping site Bucura

- Location within Romania
- Location: Romania; Hunedoara County
- Nearest city: Lupeni
- Coordinates: 45°20′N 22°50′E
- Area: 38,047 ha (94,020 acres)
- Established: 2000
- Website: retezat.ro

The Retezat National Park (Romanian: Parcul Național Retezat) is a protected area located in the Retezat Mountains in Hunedoara County, Romania. Founded in 1935, it is the oldest national park in the country and categorized as a category II IUCN national park.

Retezat is particularly notable for its biodiverse flora, with over 1,000 species of plants present within the park. It is also home to some of the last remaining pristine old-growth forests in Europe. Despite its protected status, recent decades have seen an increase in damaging activities such as logging and sheep-grazing in the park, as well as threats to its status as public property.

== History ==
The Retezat region has been a subject of scientific interest, particularly with regard to its flora, since at least the early 19th century. During the 1930s, several scientific personalities like Alexandru Borza and Emil Racoviță campaigned for the creation of nature reserves in the country. In 1935, the Tătărescu government set aside 100 square kilometres (39 square miles) of the Retezat Mountains, creating the country's first national park. It took four more years for legislation to be passed regarding the park's status, paving the way for all future protected areas of Romania.

In 1979, UNESCO included the park in the Man and the Biosphere Program international network of biosphere reserves, while in 1993 it was included by the International Union for Conservation of Nature among its demonstration projects on sustainable rural development. In 2008 it was granted the European Diploma of Protected Areas.

Since the 1990s, sheep grazing and logging increased considerably in the region, damaging the park's natural capital. In the 21st century, Retezat has been the subject of several ecological restoration efforts.

In 2006 the Romanian state decided in favor of heirs to the Austro-Hungarian aristocratic family Kendeffy, who claimed 10,000 ha (25,000 acres) of land in the Retezat Mountains, including large tracts of the park, under a law allowing the restitution of property seized by previous regimes. The Romanian Academy, who was granted the land in the 1930s, challenged the decision. After a lengthy trial, the land restitution was deemed illegal by a 2022 court decision, and the park returned to being state property.

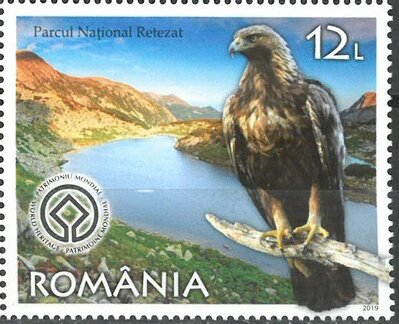
Retezat on Romanian stamp

== Description ==
The park contains more than sixty peaks over 2,300 m (7,500 ft) and about eighty glacier lakes, of which 54 are permanent. Peleaga, the highest peak of the Retezat Mountains, 2,509 metres (8,232 ft) is located in the park. Currently the park occupies 380.47 km^{2} (146.90 sq mi).

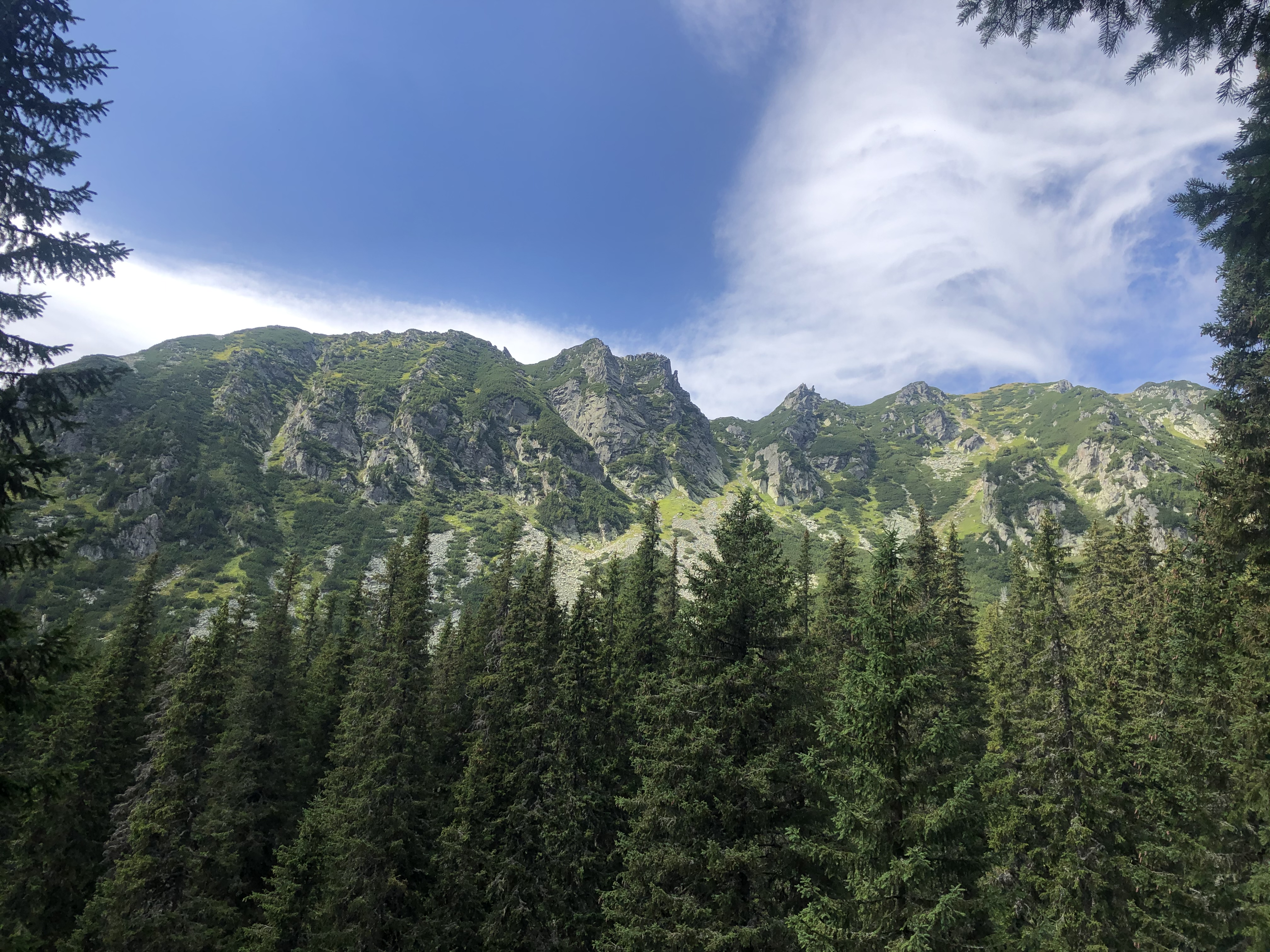
Mountains and pines in the Retezat National Park

== Flora ==
The flora of Retezat demonstrates "exceptional biodiversity", consisting of approximately 1,190 plant species, of which 130 have the "endangered" or "vulnerable" status. More than a third of Romania's flora can be found in this area. Mountain pine and juniper habitats are dominant, with spruce and rhododendron also common.

The park is often described as containing ”Europe's last intact forest", as it harbors one of the few remaining intact old-growth forest landscapes and the largest single area of pristine mixed forest on the continent. The Gemenele ("The Twins" in Romanian) scientific reserve is a strictly protected area of the park enclosing 1,800 hectares of intact old-growth forest.

== Fauna ==
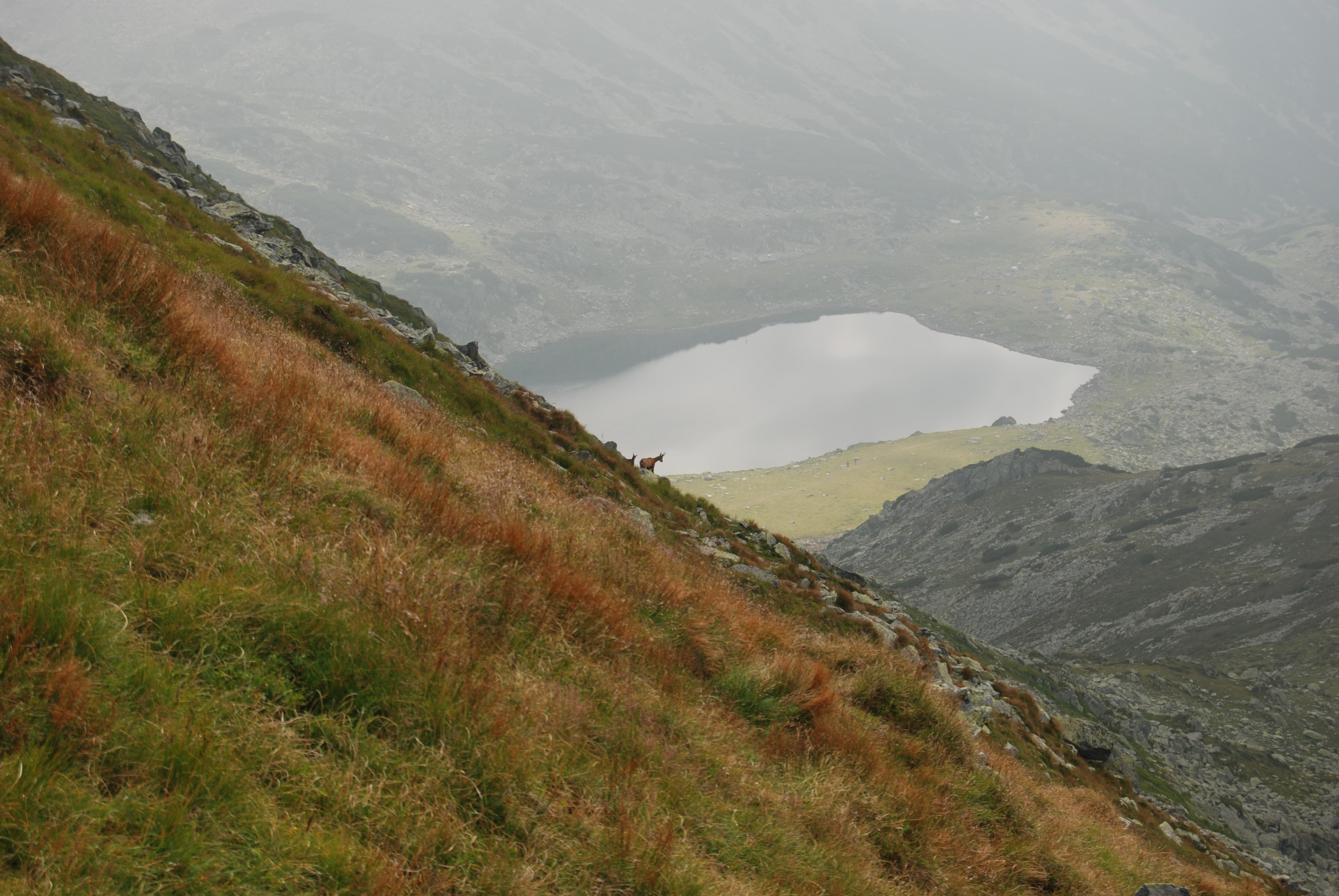
Group of chamois near Bucura Lake

The gray wolf, brown bear, wild boar, Eurasian lynx, European wildcat, chamois, roe deer, red deer, Eurasian badger, Eurasian otter, stoat and the beech marten are among the 55 species of mammal that live in the park, almost a quarter of all mammals in Romania being represented here. The Alpine marmot was introduced in the scientific reserve in 1973 and has since spread to the rest of the park. An important center for bat conservation, Retezat is home to 13 species of the Chiroptera order, including the Greater horseshoe bat, Parti-coloured bat and the Soprano pipistrelle.

The park is also home to more than a hundred bird species, many of which are protected in Romania. Present species include the western capercaillie, common kingfisher, lesser spotted eagle, black grouse, short-toed snake eagle, Eurasian eagle-owl, corn crake, black woodpecker, peregrine falcon, collared flycatcher, and the golden eagle, which is depicted on the park's logo. The park was included by BirdLife International among its Important Bird Areas.

Over 1000 species of butterflies were identified in the area, with the park containing two European Prime Butterfly Areas.

== See also ==
- Seven Natural Wonders of Romania
