= Bucura Lake =

Glacier lake in the Retezat Mountains, Romania

Lake Bucura
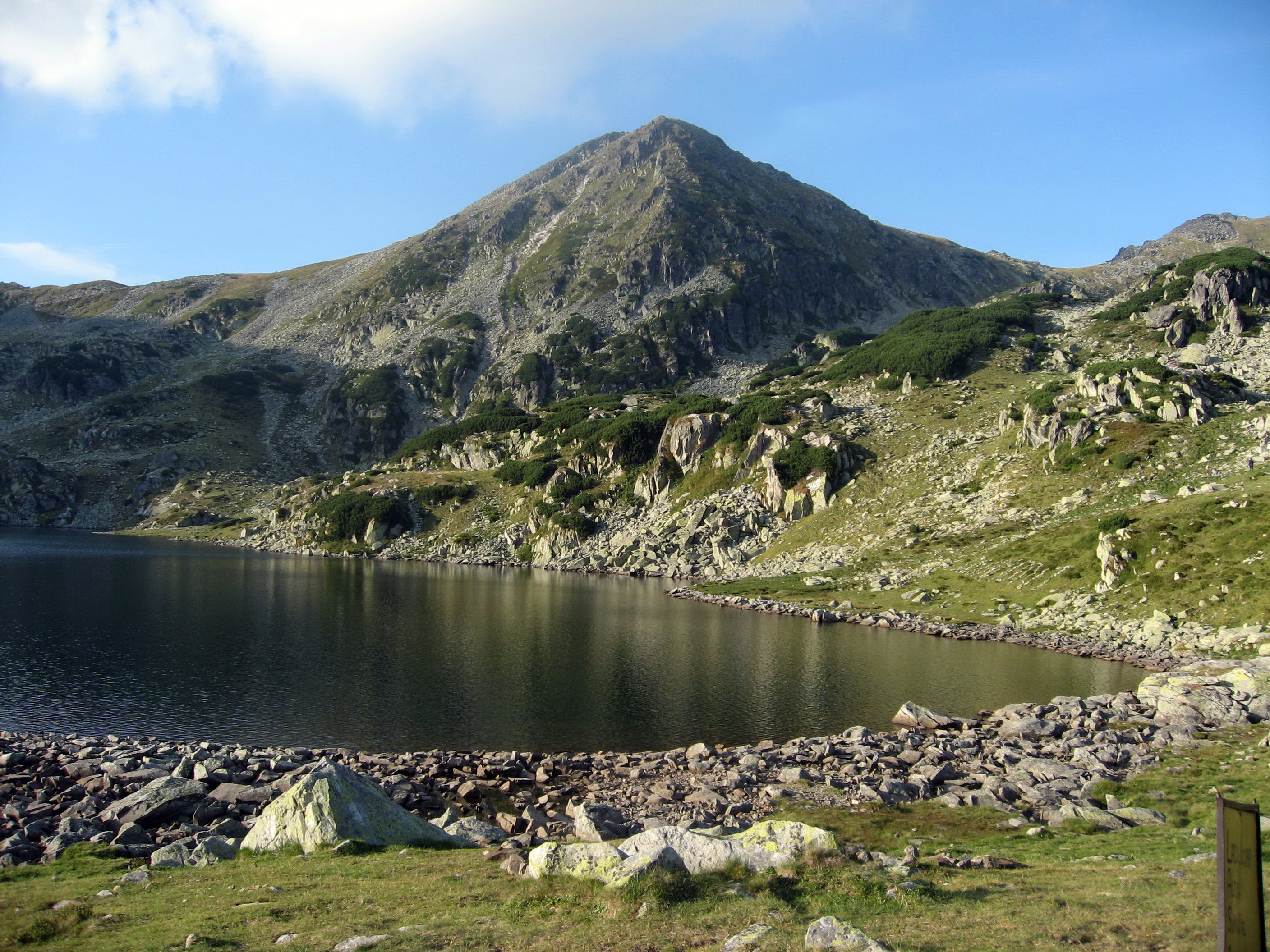

- Location within Romania
- Location: Retezat Mountains
- Coordinates: 45°21.5′N 22°52.5′E
- Type: Glacial
- Basin countries: Romania
- Max. length: 550 m (1,800 ft)
- Max. width: 225 m (738 ft)
- Surface area: 10.5 ha (26 acres)
- Max. depth: 15.5 m (51 ft)
- Water volume: 625,000 m^{3} (507 acre⋅ft)
- Shore length^{1}: 1,390 m (4,560 ft)
- Surface elevation: 2,040 m (6,690 ft)
- ^{1} Shore length is not a well-defined measure.

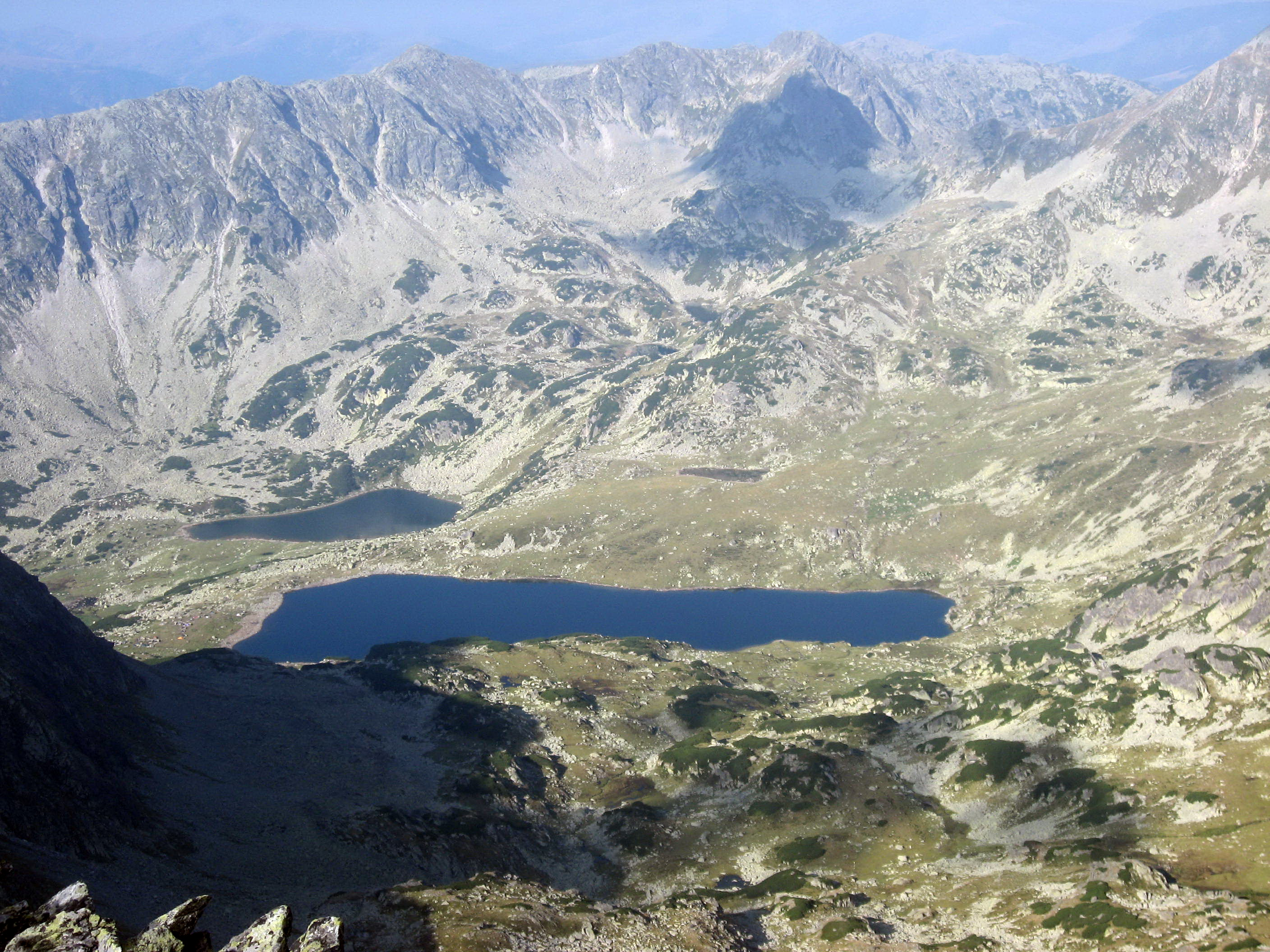
Lake Bucura

Lake Bucura is a glacier cirque lake, situated in the Retezat Mountains, in Romania. It is located south of the main ridge, at the base of Peleaga Peak, and at an altitude of about 2,040 m.

It is the largest glacier lake in Romania, with an area of over 105,000 square meters. It is 550 m in length, with 160 m of average width, and 225 m maximum width, for a perimeter of 1,390 m. The maximum depth is 15.5 m, and the volume 625,000 m³.

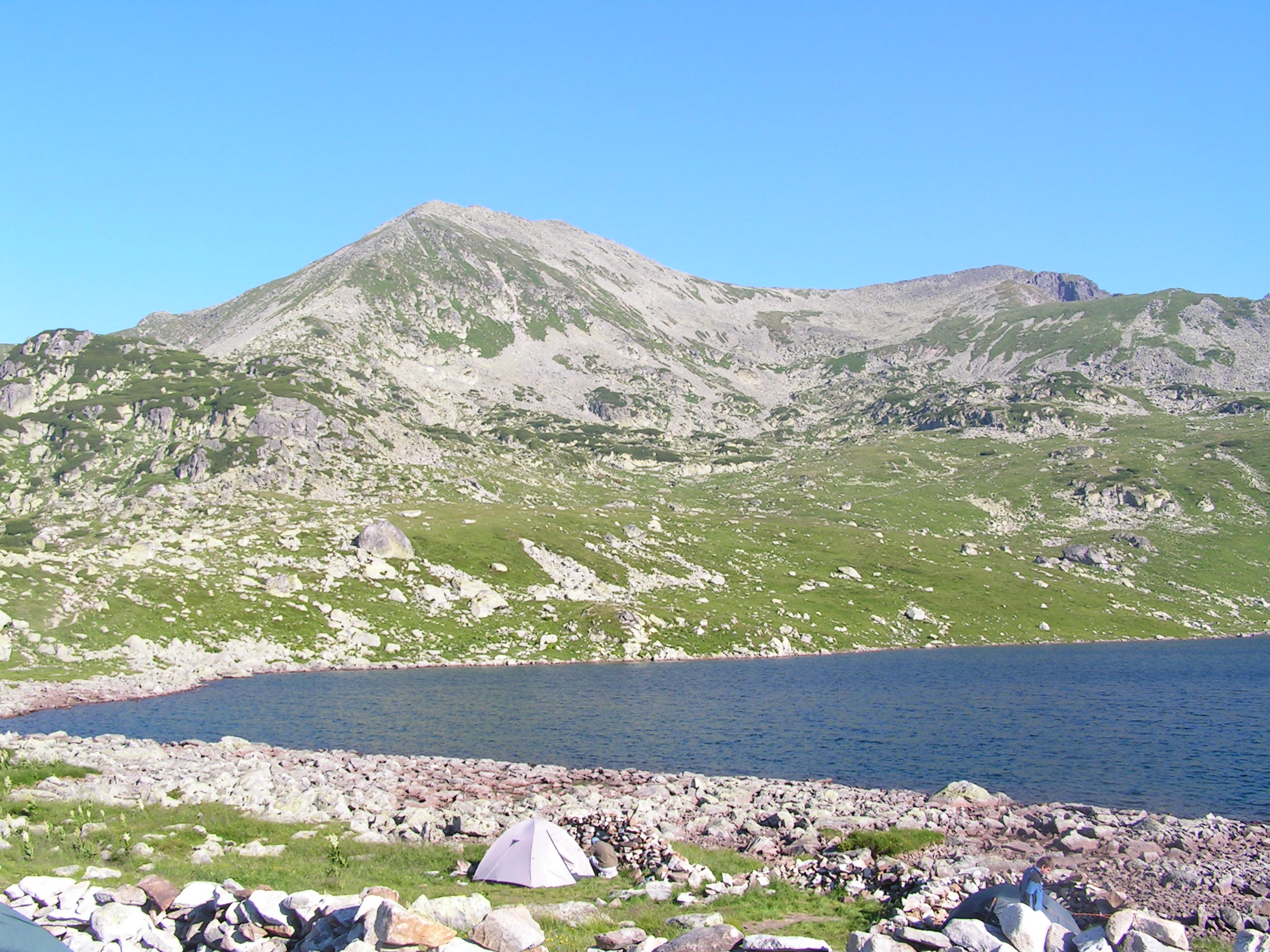
Lake Bucura and alpine camping site

== See also ==
- Lakes of Romania
