= Braia (river) =

- Location within Romania

Location
- Country: Romania
- Counties: Hunedoara County

Physical characteristics
- Mouth: Jiul de Vest
  - location: Lupeni
  - coordinates: 45.3507°N 23.1990°E
- Length: 10 km (6.2 mi)
- Basin size: 18 km^{2} (6.9 sq mi)

Basin features
- Progression: Jiul de Vest→ Jiu→ Danube→ Black Sea
- Tributaries
  - right: Pârâul Crucii, Izvorul Ciurgău

The Braia is a right tributary of the river Jiul de Vest in Romania. It discharges into the Jiul de Vest in the city Lupeni. Its length is 10 km (6.2 mi) and its basin size is 18 km^{2} (6.9 sq mi).
