= Archaeology of Iran =

The Archaeology of Iran encompasses the following subjects:

== Archaeological discoveries in Iran ==
Archaeological sites in Iran:

- Achaemenid inscription in the Kharg Island
- Achaemenid Persian Lion Rhyton
- Acropole Tomb
- Apadana hoard
- Bardak Siah Palace
- Bushel with ibex motifs
- Code of Hammurabi
- Egyptian statue of Darius I
- Golden bowl of Hasanlu
- Great Wall of Gorgan
- Hasanlu Lovers
- Islamic ceramics from the Susa site
- Luristan bronze
- Musicians plate
- Narundi
- Nazimaruttaš kudurru stone
- Parchments of Avroman
- Parthian bas-relief at Mydan Mishan
- Persepolis Administrative Archives
- Rock art in Iran
- Shami statue
- Statue of Hercules in Behistun
- Victory Stele of Naram-Sin
- Ziwiye hoard

== Archaeologists ==
- Geneviève Dollfus
- Roman Ghirshman
- Frank Hole
- Wolfram Kleiss
- Roland de Mecquenem
- Jean Perrot
- Henry T. Wright

== Iranian archaeologists ==
- Kamyar Abdi (born 1969) Iranian; Iran, Neolithic to the Bronze Age
- Abbas Alizadeh (born 1951) Iranian; Iran
- Massoud Azarnoush (1946–2008) Iranian; Sassanid archaeology
- Hamed Vahdati Nasab (born 1974) Iranian; Iran, Human Evolution, Neanderthals, Paleolithic
- Fereidoun Biglari (born 1970) Iranian Kurdish; Paleolithic
- Touraj Daryaee (born 1967) Iranian; ancient Persia (Iran)
- Seifollah Kambakhshfard (1929–2010) Iranian; Iron Age Temple of Anahita
- Yousef Majidzadeh (born 1938) Iranian; Jiroft culture (Iran)
- Sadegh Malek Shahmirzadi (1940–2020) Iranian; ancient Persia (Iran)
- Marjan Mashkour (born 19??) Iranian; zooarchaeology of Europe and the Middle East
- Ezzat Negahban (1926–2009) Iranian; Iran
- Shahrokh Razmjou (1966) Iranian; Achaemenid Archaeology
- Vesta Sarkhosh Curtis (1951) Iranian; the British Museum's Curator of Middle Eastern coins
- Alireza Shapour Shahbazi (1942–2006) Iranian; Iran
- Parviz Varjavand (1934–2007) Iranian; ancient Iran (Persia)

== Archaeological institutions in Iran ==
- Society for the National Heritage of Iran
- Museum of Ancient Iran
- National Museum of Iran
- Zagros Paleolithic Museum
- Iron Age museum

== Archaeological cultures in Iran ==
- Traditional water sources of Persian antiquity
- Palaeolithic Era in Iran
- Bus Mordeh phase
- Kura–Araxes culture
- Baradostian culture
- Talish–Mughan culture
- Trialetian Mesolithic
- Zarzian culture
- Gutian people
- Jiroft culture
