= Malia =

Malia or Mallia may refer to:

== Places ==
- Malia (archaeological site), a Minoan/Mycenae archaeological site in Greece
- Malia, Crete, a town on the north coast of Crete
- Malia, Cyprus, a village in southern Cyprus
- Malia, Iran, a village
- Malia, a taluk(a) (administrative division) in Junagadh district, Gujarat, India
- Malia, an ancient name of Cape Agrilia, a cape on the island of Lesbos, Greece
- Malia, name used by travellers for Mi'ilya

== People ==
=== Historical ===
- Mallia gens, a plebeian family of ancient Rome

=== Surname ===
- Emmanuel Mallia, a Maltese politician
- Francisco Jesús Pérez Malia or Francis (born 1981), Spanish footballer
- George Mallia (born 1978), a professional Maltese footballer
- Gorg Mallia (born 1957), a Maltese communications academic, author and cartoonist
- Juan Cruz Mallía (born 1996), Argentine rugby union player
- Liz Malia (born 1949), American politician
- Martin Malia (1924–2004), American historian specializing in Russian history
- Mitchell Mallia (born 1992 in New South Wales), an Australian footballer

=== Given name ===
- Malia (American musician), American singer-songwriter
- Malia (singer) (born 1978), Malawian vocalist
- Malia (model) (born 1983), Japanese fashion model
- Malia Baker (born 2006), Canadian actress
- Malia Cohen (born 1977), American politician
- Mallia Franklin (1952–2010), a vocalist with Parliament-Funkadelic
- Malia Hosaka (born 1969), American professional wrestler
- Malia Johnston, New Zealand choreographer and dance director
- Malia Jones (born 1977), American model and surfer
- Malia Manuel (born 1993), American professional surfer
- Malia Scotch Marmo, American screenwriter
- Malia Metella (born 1982), French Olympian swimmer
- Malia Obama (born 1998), daughter of former U.S. President Barack Obama
- Malia Pyles (born 2000), American actress
- Malia Schneider (born 1998), Canadian ice hockey player

== Other uses ==
- Malians (Greek tribe), in Ancient Greece
- Malia (bird), a passerine bird endemic to Sulawesi
- Malia (canoe), a Hawaiian-style wooden racing canoe
- "Malìa" (song), an 1887 song by Paolo Tosti
- Malìa, a 1946 film directed by Giuseppe Amato
- Vergine e di nome Maria, a 1975 Italian film, also titled Malía
- Malta Library and Information Association (MaLIA), a member of the International Federation of Library Associations

== See also ==
- Hawaiian name
- Malea (disambiguation)
- Maleia, a river in Romania
- Malian (disambiguation)
- Maliya, the Hittite goddess of gardens
