= Malea =

Malea may refer to:

== Genera ==
- Malea (plant), a genus of flowering plant in the family Ericaceae
- Malea (gastropod), a genus of large sea snails, containing two species

== Places ==
- Malea, a village in Zau de Câmpie Commune, Mureș County, Romania
- Maléa, a town in northeastern Guinea
- Malea (Arcadia), a town in ancient Arcadia, Greece
- Malea (Lesbos), a town in ancient Lesbos, Greece
- Cape Malea, one of the peninsulas in the southeast of the Peloponnese in Greece
- Malea, ancient name of Cape Agrilia, a peninsula in the southeast of Lesbos, Greece

== See also ==
- Maleia, a river in Romania
- Malia (disambiguation)
