= Malyan =

Malyan (Armenian: Մալյան) is an Armenian surname. It may refer to:

People

- David Malyan (1904–1976), Soviet Armenian film and stage actor
- Henrik Malyan (1925–1988), Soviet Armenian film director and writer

Places

- Malyan, Fars, Iran

== See also ==
- Malian
- Maliyan
