= Aușel =

- Location within Romania

Location
- Country: Romania
- Counties: Hunedoara County

Physical characteristics
- Mouth: Taia
  - coordinates: 45.5087°N 23.4197°E
- Length: 10 km (6.2 mi)
- Basin size: 42 km^{2} (16 sq mi)

Basin features
- Progression: Taia→ Jiul de Est→ Jiu→ Danube→ Black Sea
- Tributaries
  - right: Dobraia

The Aușel is a left tributary of the river Taia in Romania. It flows into the Taia north of the town Petrila. Its length is 10 km (6.2 mi) and its basin size is 42 km^{2} (16 sq mi).
