= Jupâneasa =

- Location within Romania

Location
- Country: Romania
- Counties: Hunedoara County

Physical characteristics
- Mouth: Bănița
  - location: Peștera
  - coordinates: 45.4525°N 23.3161°E
- Length: 17 km (11 mi)
- Basin size: 47 km^{2} (18 sq mi)

Basin features
- Progression: Bănița→ Jiul de Est→ Jiu→ Danube→ Black Sea
- Tributaries
  - left: Galbena
  - right: Valea Drugului

The Jupâneasa is a left tributary of the river Bănița in Romania. It flows into the Bănița in Peștera. Its length is 17 km (11 mi) and its basin size is 47 km^{2} (18 sq mi).
