= Jigureasa =

Jigureasa may refer to the following rivers in Romania:

- Jigureasa, a tributary of the Bănița in Hunedoara County
- Jigureasa, a tributary of the Strei in Hunedoara County

== See also ==
- Jiguroșița River
