= Piroska Oszoli =

Hungarian painter

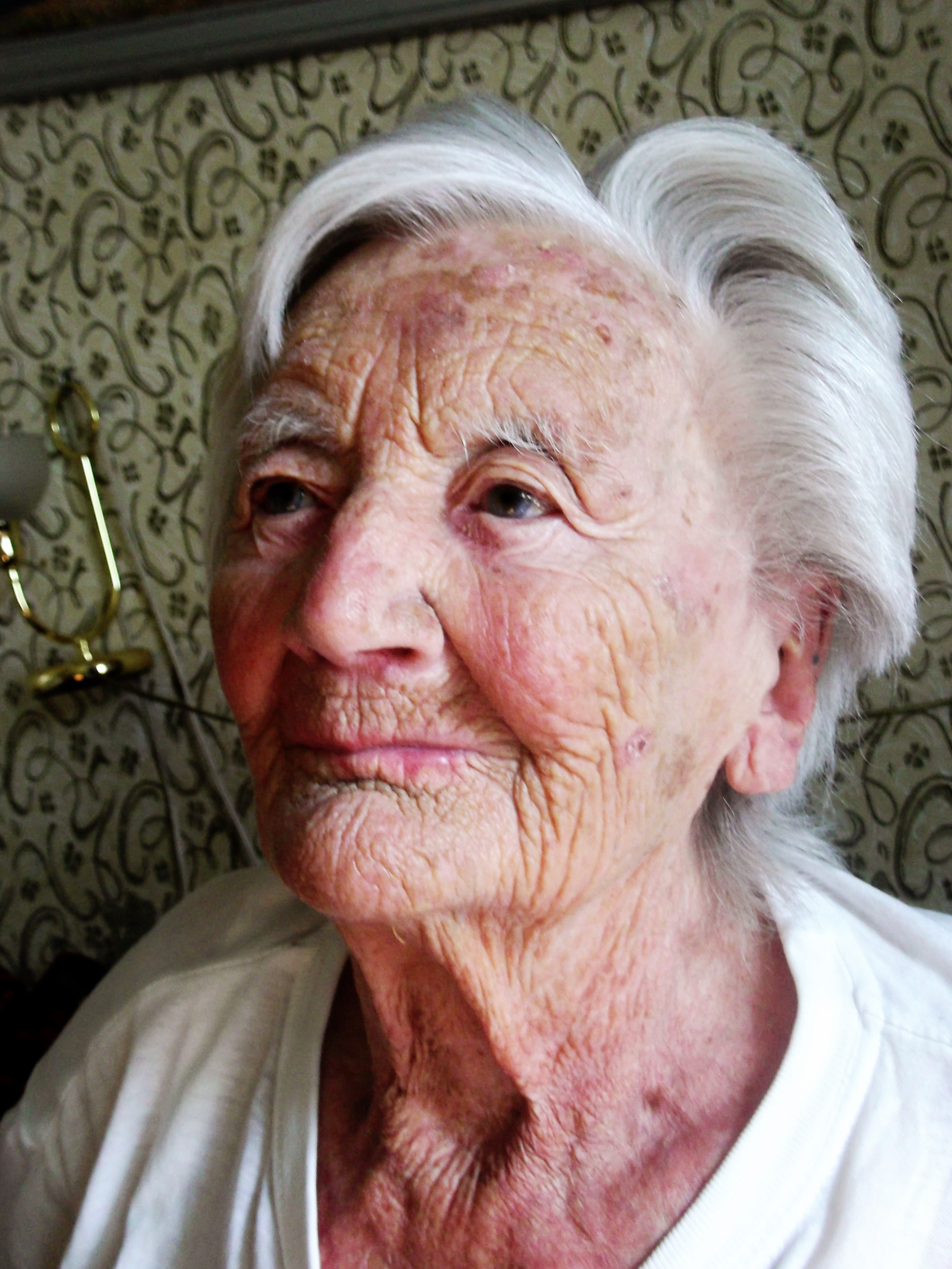
Piroska Oszoli Hungarian painter (1919–2017)

Piroska Oszoli (21 January 1919 – 22 March 2017) was a Hungarian painter, is known as "The lover of the Danube and the beautiness". She worked especially as applied to plein air landscape painting.

== Life ==
Piroska Oszoli (née Névery) was born in Dunaföldvár, Hungary in a Roman Catholic baron family on 21 January 1919. After finishing her studies, she taught literature and history in Budapest. Her master as an amateur artist was the note Transylvanian painter Ferenc Doór (1918–2015).

From 1947, after having returned in her native village to teach painting for schoolchildren, she completed her art studies as well. Her husband was István Oszoli, a high school biology and chemistry teacher from 1949 until his death in 2003. They have two sons, István (b. 1950) and András (b. 1953). After teaching she became a pensioner, and started her painting as an individual artist. She worked all around her village and neighborhood, after in Hungary, at Lake Balaton for example, and also in some beautiful places of Europe, from Italy to Norway, and from Germany to Croatia. She had numerous expositions in her Country. Her paintings are present around the World from Austria to New Zealand.

She died in her home in Dunaföldvár at the age of 98 years on 22 March 2017.

== Prizes ==
- 1996 Honorary citizen of Dunaföldvár

== Sources ==
- Her C.V. in art from 2001
- Gallery with her 126 paintings
