= Sterminos River =

Sterminos River may refer to:

- Sterminos, a tributary of the Negoi in Hunedoara County, Romania
- Sterminos, a tributary of the Jiul de Est in Hunedoara County, Romania
- Sterminos, a tributary of the Jiul de Vest in Hunedoara County, Romania
