= Marjan Mashkour =

Iranian archaeologist

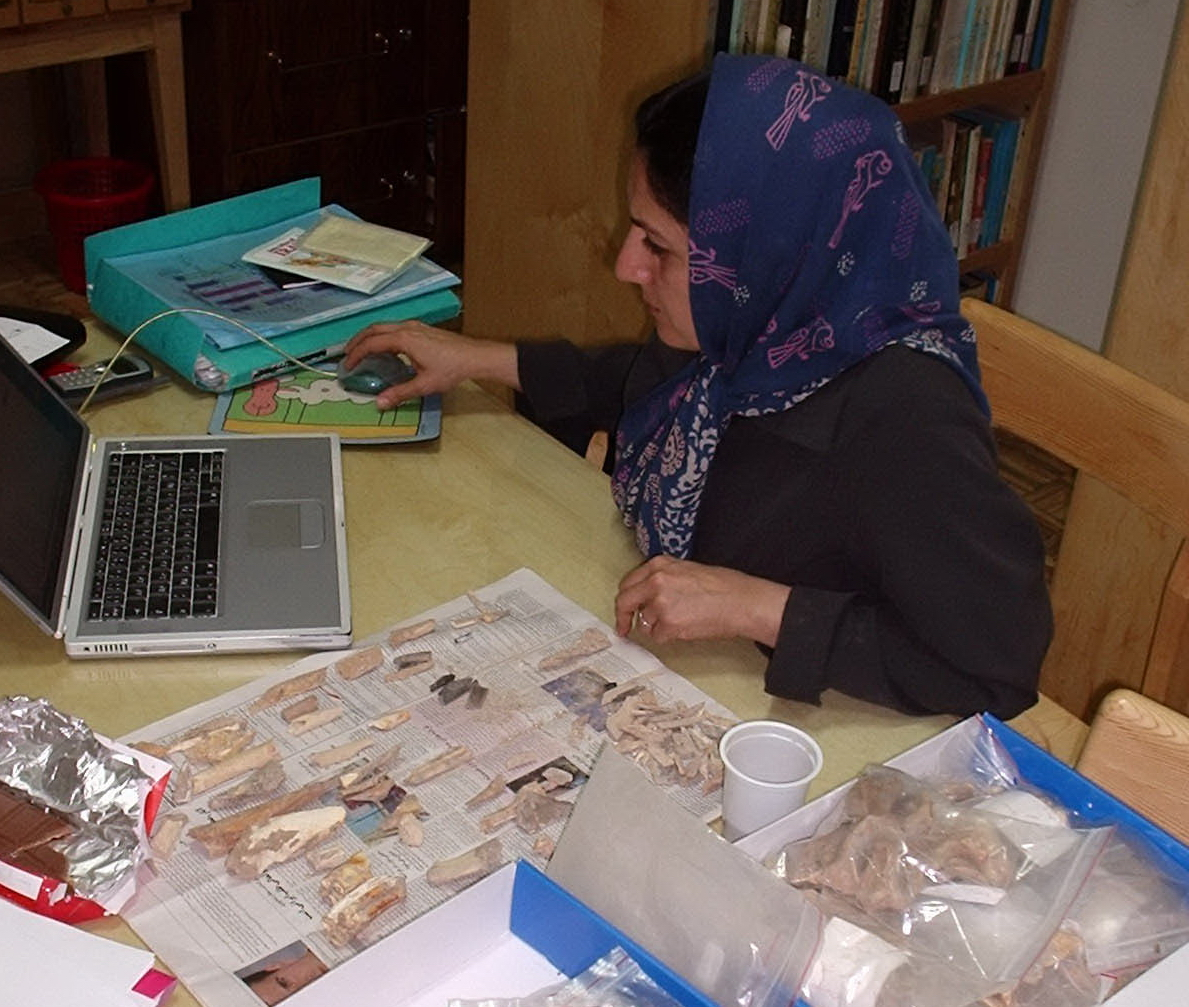
Marjan Mashkour, June 2005

Marjan Mashkour (Persian: مرجان مشکور) is an archaeologist and member of the French National Centre for Scientific Research. She is the first Iranian to specialize in the field of zooarchaeology and has been engaged in many field and laboratory projects in Iran and the Near East.

== Thesis ==
Mashkolur received her Ph.D. in zooarchaeology from the University of Paris I-Sorbonne) in 2001. Her thesis was "Chasse et élevage du Néolithique à l'Âge du Fer dans la plaine de Qazvin (Iran). Étude archéozoologique des sites de Zagheh, Qabrestan et Sagzabad", ("Hunting and farming from the Neolithic to the Iron Age in the plain of Qazvin (Iran). Archaeozoological study sites Zagheh, and Qabrestan Sagzabad")

== Research interests ==
Mashkour has published widely on the archaeology of the Near East, including editing 'Zooarchaeology of the Ancient Near East' with Mark Beech. Her research interest is the late Paleolithic fauna of the Zagros Mountains and the domestication of the wild goat in Iran. Research in 2006 focussed on the role of pigs and boars on the ancient Iranian plateau. She has also published new collaborative research onto the origins of the donkey. Recent research has explored the domestication of dogs in the near east. As well as researching the physicality of ancient animals, Mashkour also researches how herds may have behaved in the ancient past. This leads into her wider research on palaeo-diet. This has led to further research looking at coat colour variation in ancient canids. She is helping the National Museum of Iran to establish a center for zooarchaeology and was involved in the setting up of the Zagros Paleolithic Museum. She edited a volume on osteological collections of the National Museum of Iran entitled "Human and Animal Interactions in the Iranian Plateau: Research Conducted by the Osteology Department of Iran National Museum," which was published in 2021.

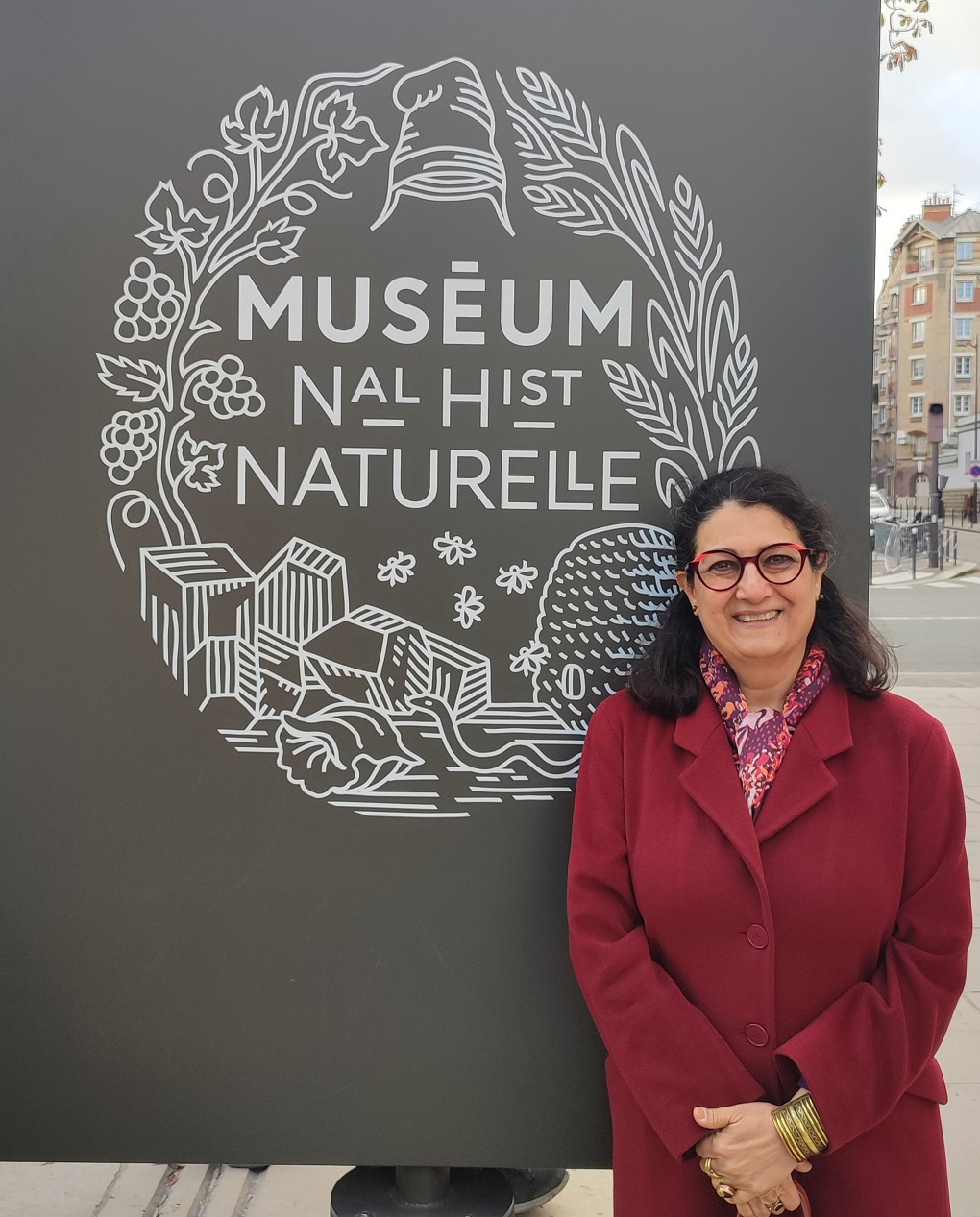
Marjan Mashkour, Zooarchaeologist, Paris 2023

== Excavations ==
Places and areas that Mashkour has excavated or suveryed include:

- Yafteh Cave, Lorestan, Iran
- Upper Khuzestan, south-west Iran
- Qazvin Plain, Iran
- Darband Cave, Iran
- Cherabad Salt Mine, Saltmen Iran
- Wezmeh Cave, western Iran
- Mewe Cave, Kurdistan, Iraq
