= Petrila Mine disaster =

Coal mine disaster in Romania

- Location of Hunedoara County in Romania
- Date: 15 November 2008
- Location: Petrila, Hunedoara County, Romania
- Deaths: 13
- Injuries: 13

On November 15, 2008, 12 miners died in two explosions at a mine in Petrila, one of six coal mining cities in the Jiu Valley region of Hunedoara County, Romania. On November 24 another miner died at Floreasca Hospital in Bucharest raising the death toll to 13.

== Background ==
The first explosion occurred in a coal mine in southwestern Romania, killing eight miners. Prime Minister Călin Popescu Tăriceanu said the explosion that killed the miners in the coal-rich Jiu Valley occurred at a depth of 950 meters.

A second explosion killed four rescue workers, said Ilie Păducel, mayor of the town of Petrila where the mine is located. Hundreds of relatives gathered at the mine after the first explosion, Realitatea TV reported. Romanian President Traian Băsescu said he would travel to the site later Saturday.

Mine officials said the explosions were believed to have been caused by an accumulation of methane gas. Officials banned anyone from going down in to mine for the next 48 hours. Eight injured were treated for burns, and officials said about 100 miners were working at the time of the first explosion.

Mining was once a thriving industry in Romania, employing almost half a million people, and miners were a feared political force in the 1990s.

However, the industry struggled in the years before the explosion, as cheaper imported coal and cleaner forms of energy emerged. Previously, in 2001, a Romanian mining explosion left 14 people dead.

== See also ==
- Jiu Valley
- League of Miners Unions of the Jiu Valley
