= Wezmeh =

Cave and archaeological site in Iran

Wezmeh Cave
- غار وزمه (Pashto)
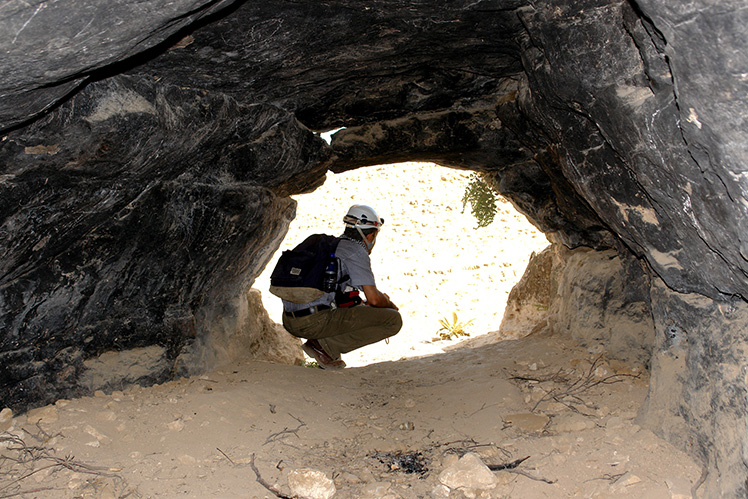
- Entrance of the Wezmeh Cave, view from inside

- Location within Iran
- Interactive map of Wezmeh Cave
- 34°03′31″N 46°38′53″E

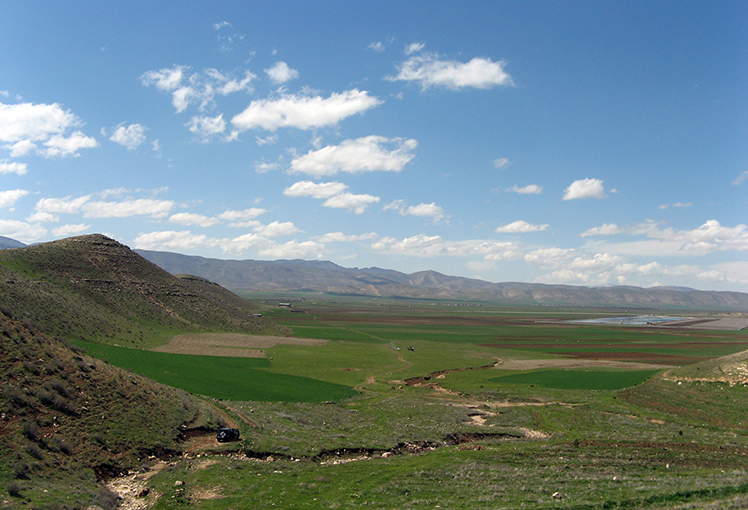
The Islamabad-e Gharb Plain near Wezmeh Cave

Wezmeh Cave is an archaeological site near Islamabad Gharb, western Iran, around 470 km (290 mi) southwest of the capital Tehran. The site was discovered in 1999 and excavated in 2001 by a team of Iranian archaeologists under the leadership of Kamyar Abdi. Wezmeh cave was re-excavated by a team under direction of Fereidoun Biglari in 2019.

== Late Pleistocene animals ==
Large numbers of animal fossil remains have been discovered so far. The dated age range of animal remains in the cave spans from 70,000 years BP to 11,000 years BP. Carnivores found in the cave include red fox, the extinct cave hyena, brown bear, wolf, lion, leopard, wildcat, badger, polecat, mongoose and beech martens. Herbivores include wild horse, asses the extinct narrow-nosed rhinoceros, wild boar, red deer, aurochs, wild goat, mouflon and gazelles. Small mammals found in the cave include hedgehogs, Indian porcupines, and the Cape hare. A number of reptiles have also been found, including the spur-thighed tortoise, rock agamas, the Montpellier snake and the blunt-nosed viper. The faunal remains were studied by Marjan Mashkour and her colleagues at the Natural History Museum in Paris and osteological department of National Museum of Iran.

== Human remains ==
Pleistocene

Several fragmented human bones and teeth were discovered at the site. Among these human remains, one tooth was studied in detail by paleoanthropologists such as Erik Trinkaus. Wezmeh 1, also known as Wezmeh Child, represented by an isolated unerupted human maxillary right premolar tooth (P3 or possibly P4) of an individual between 6–10 years old. It is relatively large compared with both the Holocene and the Late Pleistocene P3 and P4. Later, researchers analyzed it by non-destructive gamma spectrometry that resulted in a date of around 25,000 years BP (Upper Paleolithic). But later analysis showed that the gamma spectrometry date was the minimum age and the tooth is substantially older. Endostructural features and quantified crown tissue proportions and semi-landmark-based geometric morphometric analyses of the enamel-dentine junction align it closely with Neanderthals and show that it is distinct from the fossil and extant modern human pattern. Therefore, it is the first direct evidence of the Neanderthal presence in the Iranian Zagros. Given that the cave was a carnivore den during the Late Pleistocene, it is probable that the Wezmeh Child was killed, or had its remains scavenged, by carnivores who used the cave as a den.

Holocene

A human metatarsal bone fragment has also been analyzed and dated to the Neolithic period, about 9000 years ago. The DNA from this bone fragment shows that it is from a distinct genetic group, which was not known to scientists before. He belongs to the Y-DNA haplogroup G2b, specifically its branch G-Y37100, and mitochondrial haplogroup J1d6. He had brown eyes, relatively dark skin, and black hair, although Neolithic Iranians carried reduced pigmentation-associated alleles in several genes and derived alleles at 7 of the 12 loci, showing the strongest signatures of selection in ancient Eurasians. Isotopic analysis showed the man's diet included cereals, a sign that he had learned how to cultivate crops. This cave site was sporadically used by later Chalcolithic groups of the region, who used it as a pen for their herds. This cave was listed as an archaeological and paleontological site on the National Register of Historic Sites (17843) in 2006.
