= Wezmeh Child =

Hominin fossil

Wezmeh Child or Wezmeh 1 represented by an isolated unerupted human maxillary right premolar tooth (P3 or possibly P4) of an individual between 6–10 years old. It was found with large numbers of animal fossil remains in a cave site called Wezmeh near Islamabad Gharb, western Iran, around 470 km (290 mi) southwest of the capital Tehran. The site was discovered in 1999. The premolar is relatively large compared with both Holocene and Late Pleistocene P3 and P4. Researchers analyzed it by non-destructive gamma spectrometry that resulted in a date of around 25,000 years BP (Upper Paleolithic). But later analysis showed that the gamma spectrometry dates the date was minimum age and the tooth is substantially older. Endostructural features and quantified crown tissue proportions and semilandmark-based geometric morphometric analyses of the enamel-dentine junction aligns it closely with Neanderthals and shows that it is distinct from the fossil and extant modern human pattern. Therefore, it is the first direct evidence of Neanderthal presence in the Iranian Zagros. Given that the cave was a carnivore den during late Pleistocene, it is probable that the Wezmeh Child was killed, or had its remains scavenged, by carnivores who used the cave as den. Within an approximate 30 km radius of the Cave, 13 Middle Paleolithic sites have been recorded; among them, the nearest sites are located about 10 km to the northwest. The tooth is on display at Paleolithic gallery of National Museum of Iran
