= Bănița (river) =

- Location within Romania

Location
- Country: Romania
- Counties: Hunedoara County
- Villages: Bănița, Peștera

Physical characteristics
- Mouth: Jiul de Est
  - location: Petrila
  - coordinates: 45.4327°N 23.3608°E
- Length: 17 km (11 mi)
- Basin size: 103 km^{2} (40 sq mi)

Basin features
- Progression: Jiul de Est→ Jiu→ Danube→ Black Sea
- Tributaries
  - left: Dâlja, Jigureasa, Jupâneasa, Valea Roșie

The Bănița is a right tributary of the river Jiul de Est in Romania. It discharges into the Jiul de Est near the town Petrila. Its length is 17 km (11 mi) and its basin size is 103 km^{2} (40 sq mi).
