= Taia (river) =

- Location within Romania

Location
- Country: Romania
- Counties: Hunedoara County

Physical characteristics
- Mouth: Jiul de Est
  - location: Petrila
  - coordinates: 45.4507°N 23.4079°E
- Length: 21 km (13 mi)
- Basin size: 88 km^{2} (34 sq mi)

Basin features
- Progression: Jiul de Est→ Jiu→ Danube→ Black Sea
- Tributaries
  - left: Aușel

The Taia is a right tributary of the river Jiul de Est in Romania. It discharges into the Jiul de Est in the town Petrila. Its length is 21 km (13 mi) and its basin size is 88 km^{2} (34 sq mi).
