= Horațiu Lasconi =

Romanian footballer

Personal information
- Full name: Horațiu Victor Lasconi
- Date of birth: 8 April 1963 (age 63)
- Place of birth: Petrila, Romania
- Height: 1.78 m (5 ft 10 in)
- Positions: Forward; midfielder

Senior career*
Years	Team	Apps	(Gls)
1979–1980	Jiul Petroșani	2	(0)
1980	Minerul Lupeni		
1981–1982	Jiul Petroșani	41	(4)
1983	Chimia Râmnicu Vâlcea	8	(0)
1983–1988	Jiul Petroșani (Note: The statistics for the 1985–86 and 1987–88 Divizia B seasons are unavailable.)	86	(17)
1988	Steaua București	6	(1)
1989–1991	Jiul Petroșani	64	(12)
Total		207	(34)

International career
1981	Romania U20		
1988	Romania	3	(0)
Medal record
Representing Romania
FIFA World Youth Championship
Bronze medal – third place	FIFA U-20 World Cup	1981 Australia
- * Club domestic league appearances and goals

Horațiu Victor Lasconi (born 8 April 1963) is a Romanian former footballer who played as a forward and midfielder.

== Club career ==
Lasconi was born on 8 April 1963 in Petrila, Romania. He began playing football at Jiul Petroșani, making his Divizia A debut on 26 March 1980 under coach Nicolae Oaidă in a 4–0 away loss to Universitatea Cluj. He started the following season by playing in the first half for Minerul Lupeni in Divizia B, but returned to Jiul for the second half. In the middle of the 1982–83 season, Lasconi joined Chimia Râmnicu Vâlcea. After half a year, he returned to Jiul with whom he suffered a relegation to Divizia B at the end of the 1984–85 season. Lasconi stayed with the club, helping it gain promotion back to the first league after one year. However, they were relegated once again at the end of the 1986–87 season. Subsequently, he spent one more season with The Miners in the second league and then went to Steaua București. There, Lasconi scored in his debut, a 3–2 victory against FC Brașov. He played six matches and scored once under coach Anghel Iordănescu in the first half of the 1988–89 season. He left the club in the middle of the season to rejoin Jiul, but The Military Men managed to win The Double without him. Lasconi helped Jiul get promoted to the first league at the end of the season. In the following season, he scored a personal record of eight goals. However, at the end of the 1990–91 season, Jiul was relegated once again. Lasconi made his last Divizia A appearance on 16 June 1991 in Jiul's 4–0 home win over FC Brașov, totaling 200 matches with 34 goals in the competition. He retired at age 28 due to knee problems.

== International career ==
Lasconi was selected by coach Constantin Cernăianu to be part of Romania's under-20 squad for the 1981 World Youth Championship held in Australia. The team finished the tournament in third position, winning the bronze medal.

Lasconi made three appearances for Romania, all of them while playing in the second league for Jiul Petroșani. He made his debut on 6 February 1988 under coach Emerich Jenei in a 2–2 draw against Poland. His following two appearances occurred in the same year, a 2–0 loss to Ireland and a 3–3 draw against East Germany.

== Personal life ==
In 2016, Lasconi received the Honorary Citizen of Petroșani title.

== Honours ==
Jiul Petroșani

- Divizia B: 1985–86, 1988–89

Steaua București

- Divizia A: 1988–89
- Cupa României: 1988–89
