= Alexandru Hrisanide =

Romanian pianist and composer (1936–2018)

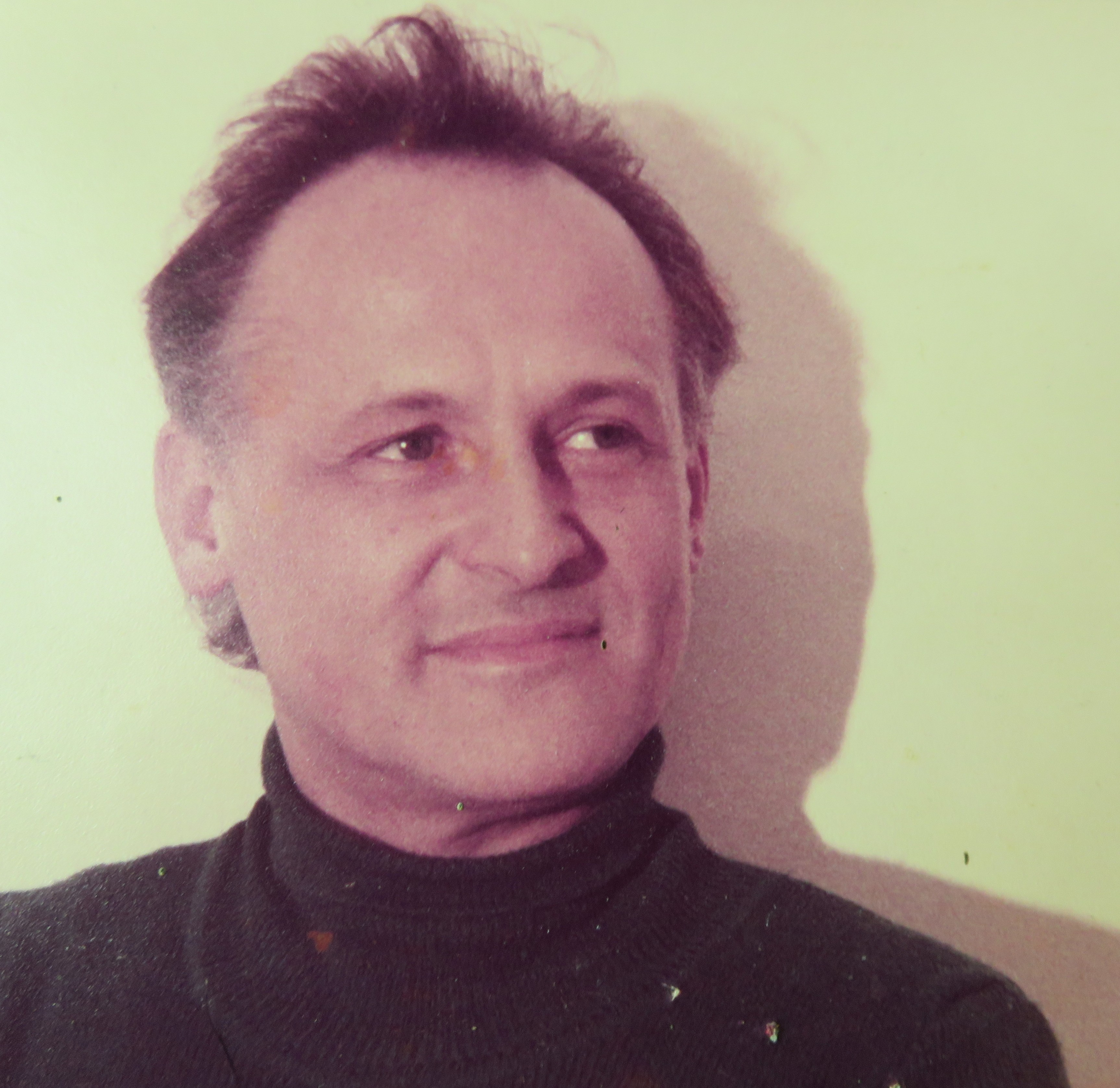
Photo of Alexandru Hrisanide, taken after he settled in the Netherlands

Alexandru Hrisanide (15 June 1936 – 19 November 2018) was a Romanian pianist and composer who was a representative of late 20th century Romanian avant-garde. A Netherlands resident since 1974, he taught piano and composition at the Amsterdam and Tilburg Academies of Music. Hrisanide's music achieves an original synthesis between archaic melos and modes on the one hand, and the accomplishments of the modern Viennese school on the other. He won the Lili Boulanger Foundation Prize in 1965.

== Biography ==
Born in Petrila, Romania, Hrisanide studied piano and composition at the Bucharest Academy of Music between 1953 and 1964. His composition teachers were Mihail Jora, Paul Constantinescu and Tudor Ciortea; he studied piano with Florica Musicescu and Cornel Gheorghiu. In 1965 he continued his musical studies with Nadia Boulanger at the American Conservatory of Music (Fontainebleau, France), and in 1965 and 1966 he participated in the Darmstadt Internationale Ferienkurse, contemporary music workshops.

From 1959 he was a teacher at the Bucharest Music High School No. 1. He later taught at the Bucharest Academy of Music until 1972, when he left Romania. He was also active as a piano soloist, particularly in the field of new music. Many Romanian composers dedicated their works to Hrisanide. He is the first Romanian pianist to have performed in recitals with a prepared piano. His studies and articles appeared in Muzica and Contemporanul. Between 1972 and 1974 he was a visiting professor at the University of Oregon, and in 1974 he became a professor at the Amsterdam and Tilburg Academies of Music. He performed as a pianist in France, Germany, the Netherlands, Yugoslavia, Belgium, Spain, the United States, Greece, Switzerland, Austria, Italy, Britain and Canada.

Hrisanide died at the age of 82 in Haarlem, Netherlands.

== Compositions ==
- Stage music: Acte pour un homme seul by Samuel Beckett (1965), tape music.
- Vocal-symphonic music: C'était issue stellaire, cantata for male choir, organ, winds and percussion, poem by S. Mallarmé. Paris, Edition Salabert, 1969 premiered in Zagreb, 1997 Biennale of Contemporary Music, Croatian RTV Orchestra.
- Symphonic music: Poem for orchestra (1959); Passacaglia for big orchestra (1959), premiered in Bucharest. 1967, RTV Orchestra, Ludovic Bács (conductor); Vers-Antiqua. Homage to Euripides (1960), premiered In Hannover, 1966; Ad perpetuam rei memoriam (1967), three pieces for orchestra, Wiesbaden, Edition Ahn-Simrock, 1968, premiered in Bucharest, 1967, Bucharest Philharmonic, Mircea Basarab (conductor); RO for large orchestra (1968); Sonnets (1990), concerto for harpsichord and orchestra, premiered in Bucharest, 1994, New Music Week; "....the past and present and...." Concerto Per Cello [1995–1996].
- Film music: The Painter's Hands (1967), Nina Behar (director).
- Chamber Music: Classic Suite for Piano (1954–1957), Sonata No. 1 for Piano (1955–1965), Bucharest, Edition Muzicală, 1966; Piano Pieces I–XIII (1955–1964), Köln, Edition Hans Gerig, 1968, also in Rumänische Klavierminiaturen für Kinder und Jugendlichen, Leipzig, Edition Peters, 1976 (Sunset); Sonata no. 1 for flute and piano (1957); Sonata no. 3 for flute and piano (1957), Sonata fot violin and piano (1957), Bucharest, 1968; Trio for violin, viola and bassoon (1958); String Quartet (1958), Bucharest, Edit . 1969; Sonata for Piano No. 2 "Sonata Piccola" (1959, 1967); Sonata for Clarinet and Piano (1960–1962), Bucharest, Edition Muzicală, 1964; Sonata No. 2 for Piano and Flute (1960–1962), Bucharest, Edition Muzicală, 1969; Volumes, Inventions for cello and piano (1963), Bucharest, Edition Muzicală, 1967, also Paris, Edition Salabert, 1969; Sonata for Piano No. 3 "Picasso Sonata" (1956–1964), Bucharest, 1968; Music for viola and piano (Sonata), 1965, Bucharest, 1968, Edition Gerig, 1974; Wave (unda) for organ (1965), Paris, Edition Salabert, 1969; Searching for the vertical (In căutarea verticalei) (1965), three pieces for oboe solo, Köln, Edition Hans Geig, 1969; M. P. 5 (Music for 5), quintet for violin, viola, cello, saxophone tenor (or clarinet in B) and piano, Paris, Edition Salabert, 1969, premiered in Köln, Westdeutscher Rundfunk (Musica Nova); Directions (1967–1969), quintet for winds, Paris, Edition Salabert, 1969; Mers-Tefs for violin solo (1968); Musique pour R. A., Première Musique pour RA (1968–1969), experiment for piano and magnetic tape, premiere, Südwestfunk Baden-Baden, 1969; Seconde Musique pour RA (1969), experiment for piano and tape, premiere Köln, Westdeutscher Rundfunk, 1969; Troisième Musique pour RA (1970), piano and magnetic tape; Quatrième Musique pour RA`(1970); Sixième Musique pour RA (1970), piano and magnetic tape; Soliloquium II for string quartet (1970).
- Choral Music: When the first star was born, 1959, mixed choir, text by Eugen Frunza; A song for light and sun (1961), mixed choir, text by Nina Cassian; Pale leaf, yellow leaf, choir for two equal voices, text by Tudor Arghezi in Songs and madrigals, edited by Petru Simionescu, Bucharest, Edition Muzicala,1966.
- Vocal Music: Three songs for children, voice and piano (1955), Bucharest, Edition Muzicală, 1963; Four Lieder (1956), voice and piano, text by Tudor Arghezi; Two Lieder (1957), voice and piano, text by Lucian Blaga; Two Lieder (1958), voice and piano, text by Zaharia Stancu (Electrecord CS 030); The River (1959), text by Nicolae Coman; The she-kid (Iada) (1961), voice and piano, text by Tudor Arghezi, Bucharest, Edition Muzicala; Fertility (1962), voice and piano, verses by Nina Cassian; C'était issu stellaire (1965), voice and piano, text by St. Mallarmé, in Jeune école contemporaine, Paris, Edition Salabert, 1969; Mirabile auditu (1968), voice and piano, text by Nichita Stanescu; Patru sen (??) (1969) for voice, oboe¸clarinet and harp, text by Radu Rupea.

Main source: Viorel Cosma, Lexicon Muzicieni din România.

== Critical edition ==
- Neue Rumänische Klaviermusik, Köln, Edition Hans Gerig, 1969.

== Discography ==
- Trio for violin, viola and bassoon (1958), 1969, Electrecord CS 022.
- M. P. 5 ( Music for 5), quintet for violin, viola, cello, saxophone tenor (or clarinet in B) and piano, Music Nova, Electrecord CS 022.
- Sonata for clarinet and piano (1960–1962), 1969 (ECE 0389).
- Sonata no. 2 for piano and flute (1960–1962), Bucharest, 1969, Electrecord CS 020.
- Volumes, Inventions for violoncello and piano (1963), Bucharest, 1969 Electrecord CS 020.
- Searching the vertical (In cautarea verticalei), 1965, three pieces for solo oboe, Electrecord CS 032).
- Two Lieder (1958), voice and piano, text by Zaharia Stancu, Electrecord CS 030.
- ...the past, the present and... (Concerto for cello), in: Four Cello Concertos, Ensembles of the Brabant Conservatory, Jan Cober (conductor), Mirel Iancovici (cello), Fontijs KKCD 97019, 1996.
- 3 Piese pentru pian, CD I din Pagini muzicale din cariera pianistei Liana Serbescu, Electrecord, EDC 1089-1090, 2013.
- Anatol Vieru: Jeux, Radio-Television Studio Orchestra, Ludovic Baci conductor, Alexandru Hrisanide (piano), Electrecord ECD 1152.

== Students ==
Mayke Nas, Jan-Willem Rozenboom, Hawar Tawfiq, Vera Micznik, Christian Blaha

== Bibliography ==
- Coman, Lavinia: "Alexandru Hrisanide, un campion al avangardei musicale" (Alexandru Hrisanide, a champion of musical avantgarde), Muzica, serie nouă, XXVII, 6, pp. 44–71.
- Cosma, Viorel: "Hrisanide, Alexandru", in Muzicieni români, Lexicon, Bucharest, Ed. Muzicală a Uniunii Compozitorilor, 2016, pp. 237–238.
- Cosma, Viorel: "Hrisanide, Alexandru", in Muzicieni din România, Lexicon, vol. 4 (H–J), București, Ed. Muzicală, 2001, pp.72–76.
- Cosma, Viorel: "Alexandru Hrisanide", in The New Grove Dictionary of Music and Musicians, London, Macmillan, 1980.
- Baker's Biographical Dictionary of Musicians, sixth edition, London, Collier Macmillan, 1978.
- Dalhaus, C. and Eggebrecht, A. H.: Brockhaus Riemann Musiklexikon, vol. II, Mainz, Edition Schott and München, Edition Piper, 1989.
- Frank Paul, Altmann W.: Kurzgefasstes Tonkünstler-Lexicon, A–K, 2, 15th edition, Wilhelmshaven, Heinrichshofen's Verlag.
- Sava, Iosif and Vartolomei, Luminita: Small Musical Encyclopaedia, Craiova, Edition Aius, 1997.
- Sandu-Dediu, Valentina: "Towards modern music in Romania". East Central Europe. 30 (2): 1–19.
- Șerbescu, Liana: "Enigma Alexandru Hrisanide", Studii de Muzicologie, Iași, XIV, 2019, pp. 196–207.
- Șerbescu, Liana (2019). "Tinerețe fără bătrânețe: Compozitorul Alexandru Hrisanide (15 Iunie 1936 – 19 Noiembrie 2018)" [Everlasting Youth: Composer Alexandru Hrisanide (15 June 1936 – 19 November 2018)] (PDF). Revista Muzica (in Romanian). 30 (5): 39–56.
- Popovici, Doru : First Auditions in Tribuna, Cluj, 6, no. 28 (284), 12.07. 1963.
- Balan George: "Alexandru Hrisanide", in Contemporanul, 4 (850), 25.01.1963.
- Notes from concerts in Contemporanul, 26 (976), 25.06.1965.
- Pinter, Lajos: "Alexandru Hrisanide külfoldi sikerei" (Al. Hrisanide's success abroad. Interview) in Üj Élet, Tg. Mureș, 15.16.1966.
- Scurtulescu, Dan: "Works by Alexandru Hrisanide" in ??? Bucurest 16, no. 8, VIII 1966.
- Codreanu, Petre: "Radio and Television Orchestra concert: Alexandru Hrisanide – Ludovic Baci", in Informatia Bucurestiului, 14,. 4193, 3 II 1967
- Constantinescu, Grigore: "Passacaglia by Alexandru Hrisanide", in Muzica, Bucharest 17, no. 3.III 1967.
- Miereanu, Costin: Alexandru Hrisanide: "Ad Perpetuam Rei Memoriam", in Contemporanul, Bucurest, no. 52 (1107), 29 XII 1967.
- Țăranu, Cornel: Prime auditii. Alexandru Hrisanide "Ad Perpetuam Rei Memoriam", in Tribuna, Cluj, 12, no. 7 (577), 15 II 1968.
- R.R. : "Interview with Al. Hrisanide about Music = Poetry + Logic", in Ateneu, Bacau, 5, no. 9 (50), IX 1968.
- Sava, Iosif: "Al. Hrisanide: Roads wide open for contemporary music", in Scînteia Tineretului, 24, no. 6073, 28 XI 1968 (in Romanian).
- Țipei, Sever: "Alexandru Hrisanide", in România Literară, Bucharest, 2, no. 19, 8 V 1969.
- Hoffman, Alfred: "Chamber music", in România Liberă, Bucharest, 28, no.8049, 9 IX 1970.
- Țipei, Sever: "Alexandru Hrisanide: Romanian music fits in perfectly with world music", in România Literară, Bucharest, no.47, 19 XI 1970 (in Romanian).
- Ionescu, Miruna: Interlocutor: Al. Hrisanide. "First of all I am interested in Romanian contemporary music", in Informația Bucureștiului, Bucharest, 18, no 5478, 16 IV 1971.
- Ziffren, Abbie: "Romanian pianist debuts in U.S.", in The Valley News, 17 I 1973.
- Finn, Robert: "Composer Urges Study of Classics", in The Plain Dealer, Cleveland, 4 V 1973.
- Finn, Robert: "Pianist Showcases Countrymen's Works", in The Plain Dealer, Cleveland, 5 V 1973.
- "Al. Hrisanide" in Contemporanul, Bucharest, no.30 (1393), 20 VII 1973.
- Moravcsik, Michael: "Artist from Bucharest", in Old Oregon, Oregon, vol. 52, no. 3 Spring 1973.
- Honegger, Marc and Massenkeil, Günter: Das grosse Lexicon der Musik, vol. IV, Herder, Freiburg-Basel-Wien, 1976.
- Pedigo, Alan: International Encyclopaedia of Violin-Keyboard Sonatas and Composer Biographies, Boonville, Arriaga Publications, 1979.
- "Romanian Music at Carnegie Hall", in Jurnal Intern, 2, no. 158, 11 VI 1991.
- Cosma, Viorel: "The George Enescu International Festival and the Romanian diaspora", in Romania Libera Extern, 2, no. 68, 8 IX 1991.
- Florea, Anca: "Alexandru Hrisanide: pianist and composer". In Vestitorul Românesc, Bucharest, no. 37 (85), 17 IX 1991.
- Manea, Ion: Encyclopedia. Romanians in Western science and culture, Davis, Edition ARA Publications, vol. 13, 1992.
- Zottoviceanu Elena: "Master copy", in Spectacolul Muzicii, Bucharest, no. 36, 25 X 1995 (in Romanian).
