= Malian =

Malian may refer to:

- Malian, Iran (disambiguation), places in Iran with the name
- Something of, from, or related to Mali, a country in West Africa
- Something of, from, or related to the Malians (Greek tribe) in Ancient Greece
- Something of, from, or related to the Mali Empire, a medieval West African civilization from c. 1247 to c. 1600

== See also ==
- List of all pages beginning with "Malian"
