= Malea pilosa =

Scientific classification
- Kingdom: Plantae
- Clade: Tracheophytes
- Clade: Angiosperms
- Clade: Eudicots
- Clade: Asterids
- Order: Ericales
- Family: Ericaceae
- Genus: Malea; Lundell
- Species: M. pilosa

Binomial name
- Malea pilosa Lundell

Species of flowering plant

Malea pilosa is a species of flowering plant in the family Ericaceae. It is the only species in the genus Malea, and is native to Mexico.

Many botanists merge the species of the genus Malea into the large genus Vaccinium, where the species takes the name Vaccinium lundellianum L.O.Williams (the name Vaccinium pilosum cannot be used for this species as it already applies to a different species of Vaccinium).
