= Zagros Paleolithic Museum =

Museum in Kermanshah, Iran

Coordinates: 34°19′07″N 47°04′19″E

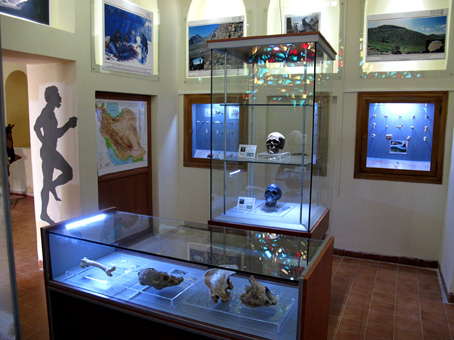
Interior of the second room of Zagros Paleolithic Museum.

Zagros Paleolithic Museum (Persian: موزه پارینه‌سنگی زاگرس) is a museum in Kermanshah, Iran, established in 2007. The museum contains stone tools and animal fossil bones from Paleolithic sites in Iran.

== History ==
The museum was established in 2007 .

== Collections ==
The Zagros Paleolithic Museum features four galleries exhibiting artifacts from key Paleolithic and Neolithic sites across Iran. Its oldest specimen is a stone tool from Kashafrud,(Khorasan Province), dating to nearly one million years ago. Additional exhibits include replicas of Neanderthal and Homo sapiens (anatomically modern human) skulls, reconstructed imagery of Stone Age hunters, and animal fossils from sites like Wezmeh Cave. The galleries further showcase lithic artifacts spanning various Paleolithic and Neolithic periods.

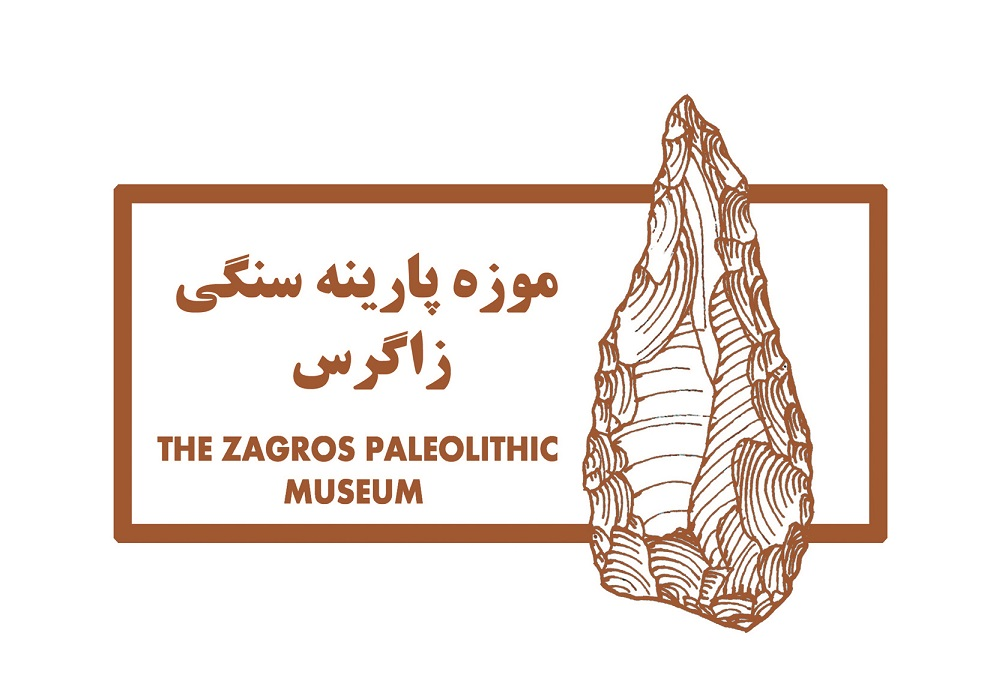
The logo of Zagros Paleolithic Museum

== Galleries ==
The museum comprises four galleries showcasing artifacts from the Paleolithic and Neolithic periods, spanning a period from approximately 100,000 to 8,000 years ago.

Gallery One: Features a documentary on lithic (stone) tool technology and manufacturing techniques used by early humans.

Gallery Two: Dedicated to animal bones from the Paleolithic era discovered in the Zagros region.

Gallery Three: Houses stone tools from the Paleolithic period excavated at various archaeological sites.

Gallery Four: Exhibits stone tools and animal bones dating to the late Stone Age (Epipaleolithic/Mesolithic) and Neolithic periods.
