= Maliyan =

Maliyan or Malian or Melyan or Malyan (Persian: مليان) may refer to:

- Malyan, Fars
- Malian, Hamadan
- Maliyan, Lorestan

Maliyan is a name of Jonsar tribal family in Uttarakhand, India.
