= Shahrokh Razmjou =

Iranian archaeologist and historian

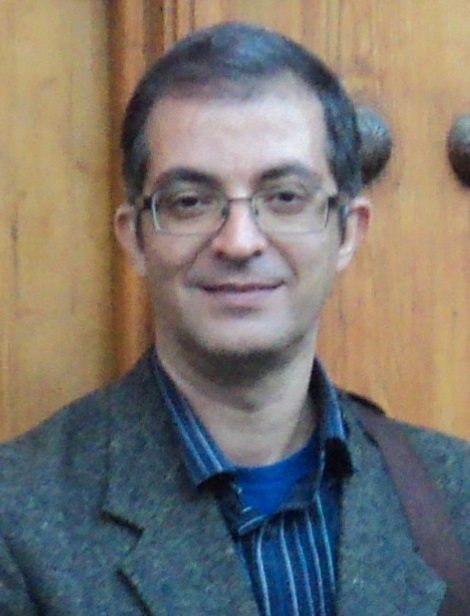
Shahrokh Razmjou, ICOMOS, Tehran, 2013

Shahrokh Razmjou (Persian: شاهرخ رزمجو) is an Iranian archaeologist and historian, specializing in Achaemenid Archaeology and History.

He received his PhD in Achaemenid Archaeology at the University of London. He established the Inscriptions Hall (1998–1999) and the Centre for Achaemenid Studies (2001) at the National Museum of Iran. He was curator of Ancient Iran in the Department of the Middle East, British Museum (2009–2012) and during this time, he produced a new updated translation of the text on the Cyrus Cylinder from Babylonian to Persian. He also excavated the ancient man-made caves of Niyasar, Kashan. He is currently teaching at the Department of Archaeology, University of Tehran.

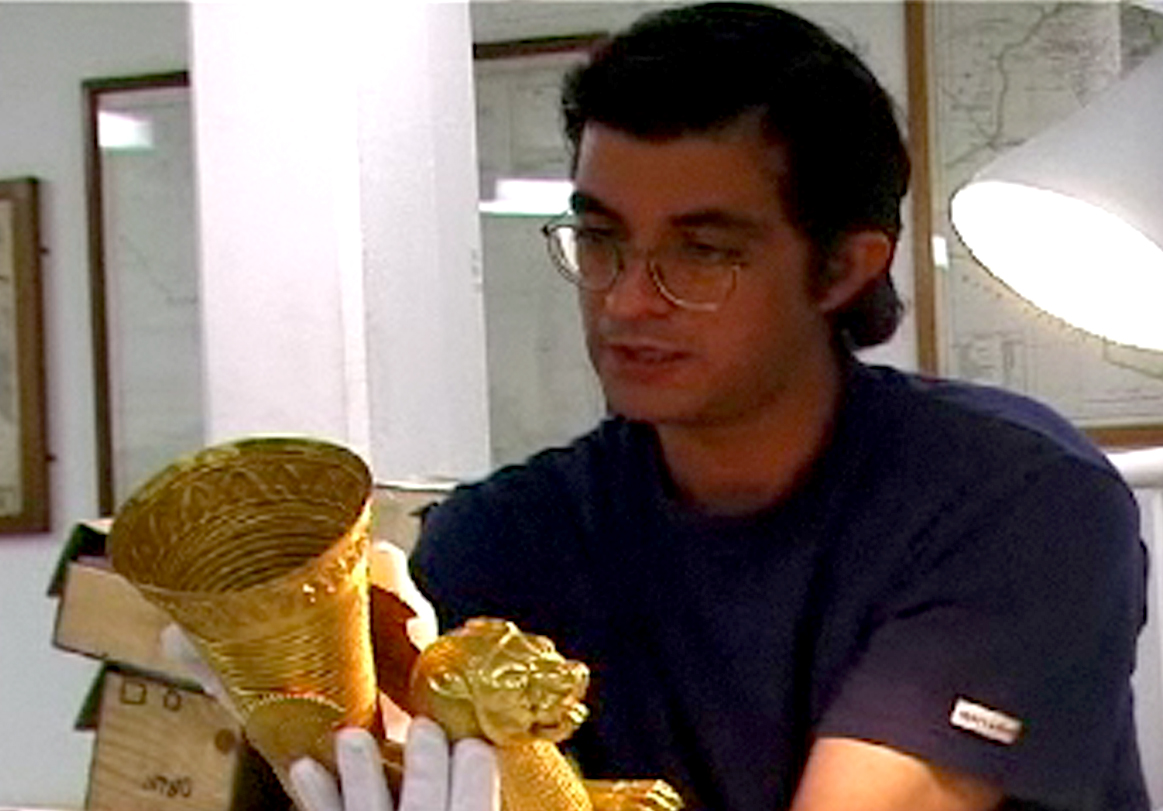
Razmjou holding an Achaemenid gold rhyton in the British Museum

== Selected publications ==
- (2021). An Achaemenid figurine in the National Museum of Iran: Proposing a reconstruction of the statue of Darius from Susa. In D. Agut-Labordère, R. Boucharlat, F. Joannès, A. Kuhrt, & M. W. Stolper (Eds.), Vingt ans après: Études offertes à Pierre Briant à l’occasion des vingt ans du Programme Achemenet (Persika, 21). Peeters Publishers & Booksellers.
- (2021) Königliche Grabmäler und Totenrituale im Achämenidenreich. In: Badisches Landesmuseum Karlsruhe (Hrsg.): DIE PERSER: Am Hof der Großkönige. Darmstadt: wbg (Wissenschaftliche Buchgesellschaft) 2021, S. 72–77. (Buchhandelsausgabe: ISBN 978-3-8053-5276-5; zugleich ANTIKE WELT-Sonderheft: ISBN 978-3-8053-5298-7).
- (2020) "Forgotten under the shadow: An unidentified structure at Persepolis". In E. Dusinberre, M. B. Garrison, & W. F. M. Henkelman (Eds.), The art of empire in Achaemenid Persia: Studies in honour of Margaret Cool Root (pp. 81–112). Peeters.
- (2012) "Left Unfinished: The 'Unfinished Gate' of Persepolis as Key Evidence for Architectural and Construction Procedure at Persepolis", Stories of Long Ago, Festschrift für Michael D. Roaf, eds. H. Baker, K. Kaniuth and A. Otto, Alter Orient und Altes Testament 397, Münster: 481–495.
- (2010) The Cylinder of Cyrus the Great, (in Persian and English), Farzan Rooz Publications, Tehran.
- (2010) "Persepolis: A Reinterpretation of Palaces and Their Function", The World of Achaemenid Persia: History, Art and Society in Iran and the Ancient Near East, Proceedings of a conference at the British Museum 29 September – 1 October 2005, eds. J. Curtis and St. J. Simpson, I.B. Tauris, London, 231–245.
- (2008) "Find Spots and Find Circumstances of Documents Excavated at Persepolis", L'archive des Fortifications de Persépolis, État des questions et perspectives de recherché, eds P. Briant, W. Henkelman and M. Stolper, Persika 12, College de France, Paris: 51–58.
- (2007) "Babylonian Astronomers and the Arrival of Alexander: A glance to the Role of Astronomy in Politics and History", (in Persian) Astronomy (Nojum) 170, Tehran: 18–23.
- (2005) "Notes on The Achaemenid Site at Farmeshgan: Iran", L'archéologie de l'empire achéménide: nouvelles recherches, Persika 6, eds. Pierre Briant, Rémy Boucharlat, College de France: 293–312.
- (2005) "Religion and Burial Customs", a chapter in: Forgotten Empire, the World of Ancient Persia, British Museum Press: 150–180.
- (2005) "The Palace", with J. Curtis, a chapter in: Forgotten Empire, The World of Ancient Persia, British Museum Press: 50-103.
- (2005)"In Search of the Lost Median Art", Iranica Antiqua,
- (2005)"Herzfeld and the Study of Graffiti at Persepolis" in Ernst Herzfeld and the Development of Near Eastern Studies 1900–1950, A Gunter & S Hauser (eds.),
- (2004)"A Bronze Bracelet with Urartian Inscription from Tul, Gilan", in M R Khalatbari (ed.) Archaeological Excavations in Ancient Sites of Talesh, Tul in Gilan
- (2004)"Unidentified Gods in the Achaemenid Calendar", in Nameye Iran-e Bastan (in Persian),
- (2003)"Assessing the Damage: Notes on the Life and Demise of the Statue of Darius from Susa" in Ars Orientalis 32: 81-104.

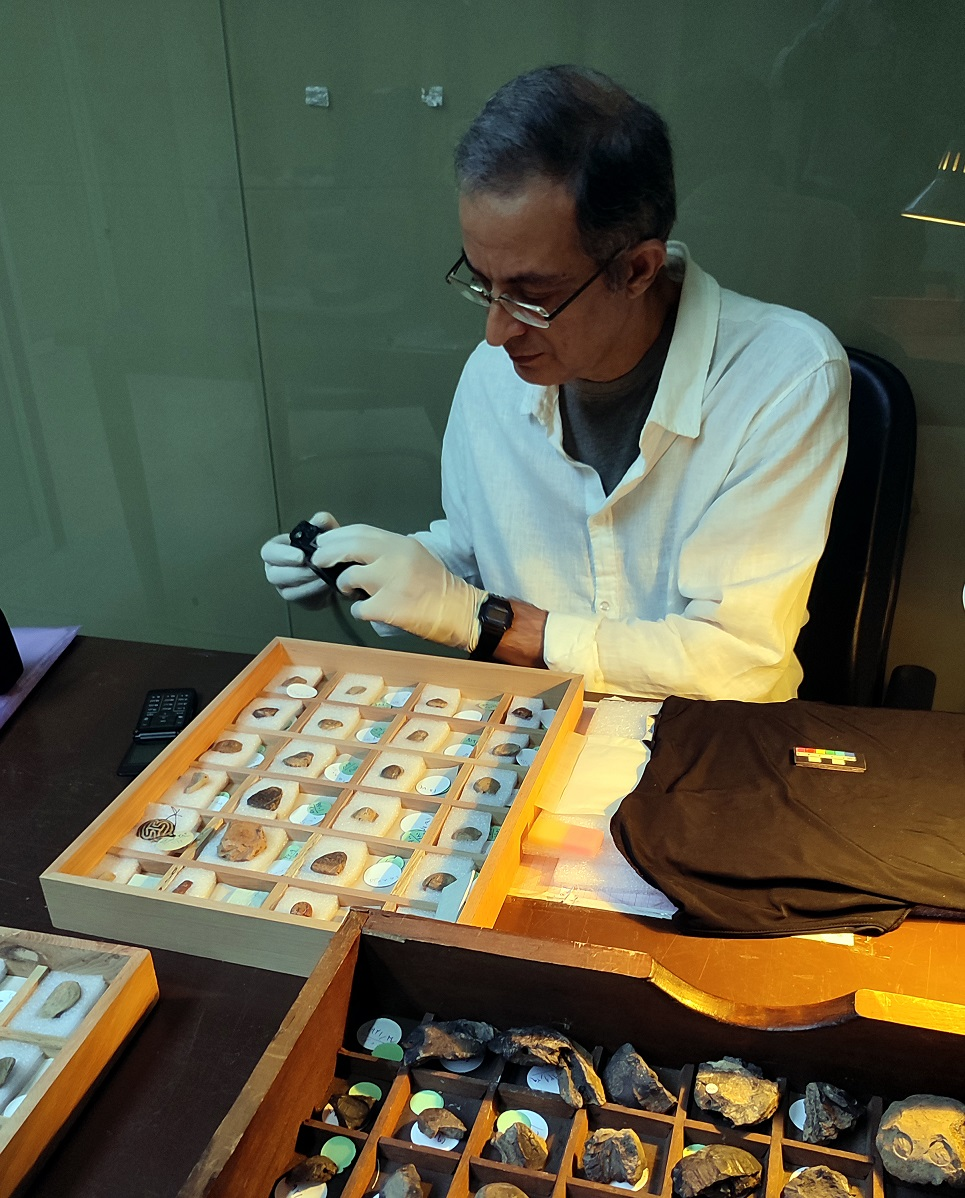
Dr. Shahrokh Razmjou studying Achaemenid clay objects in National Museum of Iran 2024
