= Kamyar Abdi =

Iranian archaeologist (born 1969)

- کامیار عبدی
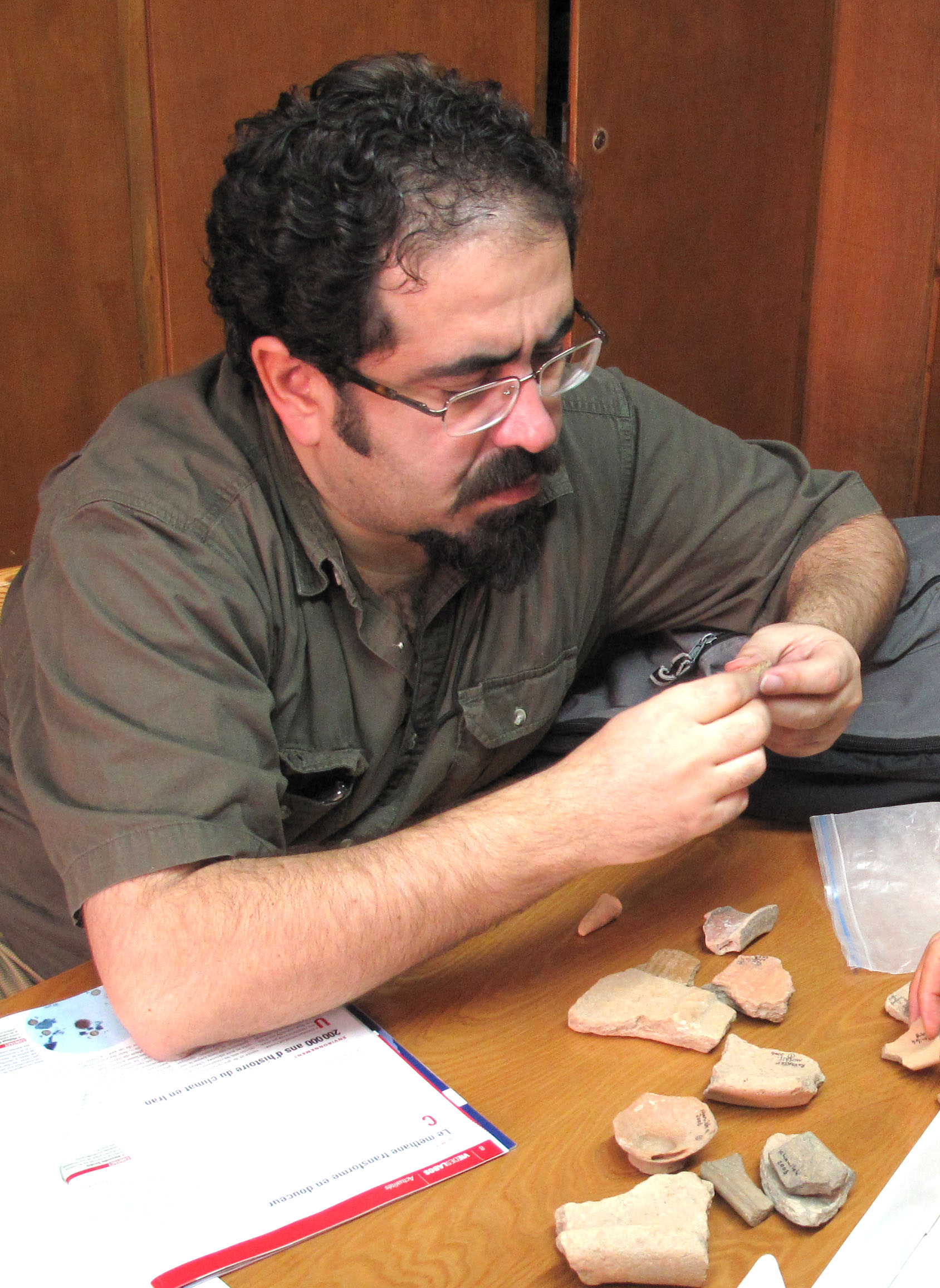
- Abdi in 2010
- Born: 1969 (age 56–57); Tabriz, Iran
- Education: University of Chicago (MA); University of Michigan (PhD)
- Scientific career
- Fields: Archeology; Anthropology
- Institutions: Iranian Center for Research on Humanities and Cultural Studies; Shiraz University

Kamyar Abdi (Persian: کامیار عبدی; born in 1969 in Tabriz) is an Iranian anthropologist and professor of Near Eastern archaeology at Shahid Beheshti University. After studying theoretical physics for a year, he began his undergraduate studies in archaeology at Tehran University, leading to a master's degree. Afterwards, he enrolled in the Oriental Institute of the University of Chicago (currently renamed as the Institute for the Study of Ancient Cultures, West Asia & North Africa) in 1994 to study Near Eastern archaeology, history, and languages. Abdi received his PhD in Anthropological Archaeology (with a focus on Near Eastern Archaeology) from the University of Michigan in 2002, under the supervision of Henry T. Wright. Prior to joining the Shahid Beheshti University in Tehran, he taught and researched in many institutions, namely Dartmouth College, Harvard University, University of California, Irvine and the British Museum. He was a research associate at the Iranian Center for Research on Humanities and Cultural Studies. In addition to many editorial memberships in national and international journals, Abdi has been affiliated with national and international councils and associations, as well as executive experiences such as directing the American Institute of Iranian Studies. Abdi has carried out many archaeological surveys and excavations in Iran, financially supported by domestic and international organizations, including the NSF, NGS, AllS, and lCAR. The outcomes of his research have played an outstanding role in assisting the scientific community with resolving many questions pertinent to Near Eastern archaeology from prehistory and the Bronze Age to the Achaemenid period. He has also participated in archaeological field projects in Turkey, Iraq, US, Mexico, and Guatemala. Abdi has published many articles and books in English and Persian, and has translated a large number of books and articles from Western languages into Persian. In the meantime, he continues to train undergraduate and graduate students and supervise graduate student thesis and dissertations.

== Biography ==
Kamyar Abdi was born in 1969 in Tabriz, Iran. Abdi received his M.A. degree in Near Eastern Languages and Civilizations at University of Chicago (1997). He continued his studied and received his Ph.D. from University of Michigan in Anthropology (2002). His dissertation was titled "Strategies of herding: Pastoralism in the middle Chalcolithic period of the West Central Zagros Mountains". From 2002 until 2008, he was an Assistant Professor in the Department of Anthropology, Dartmouth College.

His research interests include sedentism, food production (agriculture and pastoralism), and political developments in the ancient Near East. Lately he has focused his research on strategies of social integration in ancient polities. Abdi has directed archaeological projects at Malyan (ancient Anshan), Arjan, Sorkh Dom Lori, and Ziviyeh.

In the late 1990s, he led the Islamabad Archeological Research Project which discovered an ancient Neanderthal tooth which has been extensively studied, and as of 2019, it has confirmed the existence of Neanderthals in Iran roaming in the Zagros Mountains as far back as 40 to 70 thousand years ago.

He also formerly was a visiting professor at Department of Archaeology in Tarbiat Modarres University in Tehran. In 2017, he joined Shiraz University as a Full Professor. At present, he teaches at the Shahid Beheshti University.

== Published work ==
- Abdi, K. (2001) Nationalism, Politics, and the Development of Archaeology in Iran, American Journal of Archaeology 105/1: 51–76.
- Abdi, K. (2003) The Early Development of Pastoralism in the Central Zagros Mountains, Journal of World Prehistory, Vol. 17, No. 4: 395–448.
- Abdi, K. (2007) The Name Game: Persian Gulf, Archaeologists, and Politics of Arab-Iranian Relations. In Selective Remembrances: Archaeology in the Construction, Commemoration, and Consecration of National Pasts. Philip Kohl, Mara Kozelsky, and Nachman Ben-Yehuda, eds. pp. 206–243. Chicago: The University of Chicago Press.
- Abdi, K. (2008) From Pan-Arabism to Saddam Husayn's Cult of Personality: Ancient Mesopotamia and Iraqi Nationalism. Journal of Social Archaeology 8/1: 3–34.
- Abdi, K. (2012) The Iranian Plateau from Paleolithic Period to the Rise of the Achaemenid Empire. In Oxford Handbook on Iranian History. Edited by Touraj Daryaee. pp. 13–36. Oxford: Oxford University Press.
- Abdi, K. (2013) Theory and Method in Archaeology: How Can We Integrate the Two to Arrive at a Better Understanding of the Past and Apply Archaeology to Present and Future Problems More Efficiently. Payām-e Bāstānshenās 17: 17–30.
- Abdi, K. (2014) The Pre-Imperial Persians at the Land of Anshan: Some Preliminary Observations. In Excavating an Empire: Achaemenid Persia in Longue Durée, edited by T. Daryaee, A. Mousavi and Kh. Rezakhani. pp. 73–87. Costa Mesa CA: Mazda Publishers.
- Naomi F. Miller and Kamyar Abdi (eds.) (2003) Yeki Bud, Yeki Nabud: Essays on Iranian Archaeology in Honor of William M. Sumner. Philadelphia and Los Angeles: Costen Institute of Archaeology of the UCLA and American Institute of Iranian Studies.
- Susan Pollock, Reinhard Bernbeck and Kamyar Abdi (eds.) (2010) Toll-e Bashi: A Neolithic Village in Kur River Basin, Iran. Berlin: Deutsches Archäologisches Institut-Eurasien Abteilung.

== See also ==
- Kor River
