= Musicians plate =

Ancient plate found in Tabaristan, Iran

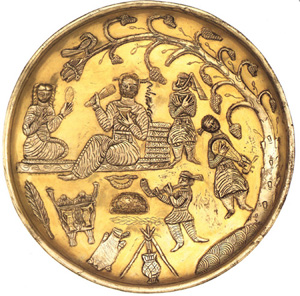
- Sasanian silver dish, showing a ruler at outdoor banquet with attendants and musicians.
- Material: Silver, Gold
- Size: Diameter: 19.7 centimetres; Height: 4 centimetres
- Created: 7th century
- Period/culture: Sasanid
- Discovered: Tabaristan
- Present location: British Museum, London
- Identification: 1963,1210.3
- British Museum webpage for this plate.

Musicians plate (Persian: بشقاب نوازندگان) is a partially gilded silver plate or dish found in Tabaristan. It was probably made in the 7th or 8th century in modern Iran, then under the Sasanian Empire, and is now in the British Museum. It shows a ruler reclining luxuriously, as he picnics while his musicians play. The plain background is gilded, while the figures and objects in low relief are left in silver. The musician on the far right is playing a stringed instrument which could possibly be an oud or barbat.

It was bequeathed to the museum by Sir Augustus Wollaston Franks in 1897.
