= Malìa (song) =

1887 Italian art song composed by Paolo Tosti

Malìa (Italian "enchantment") is an 1887 Italian art song composed by Paolo Tosti to a poem by Rocco Pagliara. It is acknowledged as one of the standards of the Italian classical song repertory.

The song begins "Cosa c'era ne'l fior che m'hai dato? forse un filtro, Un arcano poter?". - translated as "What was it in the flower you gave me, a love potion perhaps or a secret power?"
