= Ferenc Doór =

Hungarian painter

Ferenc Doór (14 June 1918 – 10 July 2015) was a Hungarian painter and graphic artist, "The lover of the Danube and Szentendre".

== Life ==
He was born in Petrilla, Transylvania on 14 June 1918. Between 1938 and 1941 he studied on the Hungarian University of Fine Arts in Budapest under the István Szőnyi's hands. After the World War II he suffered a captivity of war in Siberia for three years. After his release terminated his study in 1949, as instructor (assistant professor) of Szőnyi involved in the circulation of Hungarian artistic life. In 1957 he became a member of the Art Fund of Fine Arts Association.

By the Nagybánya's painting lessons continued painting with natural themes and human figures appear rich color scheme, has joined forces shaping a balanced composition. Oil paintings and water-like substance, were the main elements his expression of color and light.

As from his works himself wrote: "I tried my work faithfully follow art my ideas - to capture the potential of everyday life images of beauty - small joys and sorrows, our time and the change of a landscape typical timeless atmosphere of human destinies".

He died in his Szentendre home at the age of 97 years on 10 July 2015.

== Exhibitions ==
He had numerous exhibitions in Hungary and abroad, worked for decades in Szentendre and the creative community of artists houses in Szigliget, Kecskemét, Hódmezővásárhely and Mártély. In the 1950s onward featured in the Hall of Art, Budapest a common ones and in other exhibition spaces in the country.

=== Individual ===
- 1959 • Fényes Adolf Terem, Budapest
- 1965, 1971, 1983 • Derkovits Terem, Budapest
- 1974 • Zalaegerszeg
- 1979 • Nyíregyháza
- 1975, 1976 • Galleria Antelami, Bologna
- 1972 • Galerie Glaub, Cologne
- 1975, 1978 • Parma
- 1990 • Csók Gallery, Budapest
- 1993 • Művelődési Ház, Dunaföldvár

=== In group ===
- Műcsarnok országos tárlatai
- Hall of Art, Budapest
- Vásárhelyi Őszi Tárlatok, Hódmezővásárhely
- Szegedi Nyári Tárlatok
- Hatvani Biennálék
- Humor and Cartoon, Gabrovo

== Works in galleries ==
- Hungarian National Gallery, Budapest
- Déri Museum, Debrecen
- Sárospataki Múzeum, Sárospatak
- Gabrovo
- Plovdiv
- Sozopol

== Prizes ==
In 2011, he became the Hungarian Gold Cross of Merit honors.

== Literature ==
- Doór, Ferenc: Autobiography, 1998
- Artportal.hu
