= Malea (Lesbos) =

Coordinates: 39°08′27″N 26°31′39″E

Malea (Ancient Greek: Μαλέα) was a town of ancient Lesbos.

The site of Malea is located near modern Akhlia.
