= Cape Agrilia =

Southeastern most point of the island of Lesbos

Coordinates: 39°00′36″N 26°36′27″E

Cape Agrilia (Greek: Άκρα Αγριλιά, romanized: Ákra Agriliós), anciently Malea (Ancient Greek: Μαλέα) or Malia (Μαλία) or Mania (Μανία), Latin: Malia Promontorium, is the southeasternmost point of the island of Lesbos. It is also known as Agrelias.

Immediately opposite, on the mainland, is Kane Peninsula (anciently known as Cane, Aega, or Aiga) now in Turkey, and the Arginusae islands. During Ottoman rule it was called in Turkish: Zeitun Burun. It is a high and conspicuous point at sea. Xenophon says that the fleet of Callicratidas occupied this station before the sea-fight off Arginusae. There is some obscurity in Xenophon's topography in reference to this place. Thucydides is more confused; he says distinctly that Malea lay to the north of Mytilene, which is inconsistent with the position of Cape Agrilia. Possibly the Malea of Thucydides had some connection with the sanctuary of Apollo Maloeis.
