= Maleia =

- Location within Romania

Location
- Country: Romania
- Counties: Hunedoara County

Physical characteristics
- Mouth: Jiul de Est
  - coordinates: 45.4076°N 23.3647°E
- Length: 13 km (8.1 mi)
- Basin size: 13 km^{2} (5.0 sq mi)

Basin features
- Progression: Jiul de Est→ Jiu→ Danube→ Black Sea

The Maleia is a left tributary of the river Jiul de Est in Romania. It flows into the Jiul de Est in the city Petroșani. Its length is 13 km (8.1 mi) and its basin size is 13 km^{2} (5.0 sq mi).
