= Petrila =

- Town
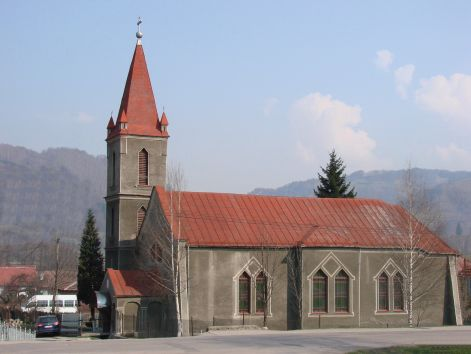
- Catholic Church in Lonea

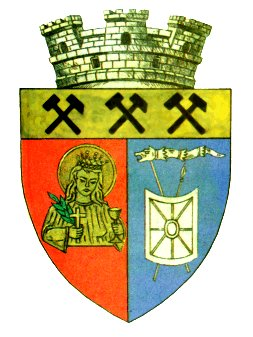
- Coat of arms

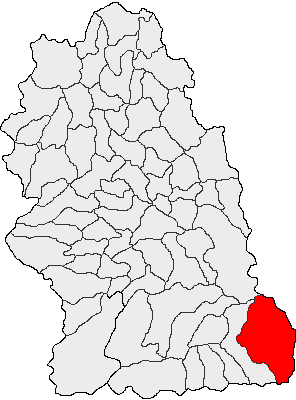
- Location in Hunedoara County

- Location in Romania
- Coordinates: 45°27′0″N 23°25′12″E
- Country: Romania
- County: Hunedoara

Government
  - Mayor (2024–2028): Vasile Jurca (PSD)
- Area: 308.68 km^{2} (119.18 sq mi)
- Elevation: 675 m (2,215 ft)
- Population (2021-12-01): 19,600
  - Density: 63.5/km^{2} (164/sq mi)
- Time zone: UTC+02:00 (EET)
  - Summer (DST): UTC+03:00 (EEST)
- Postal code: 335800
- Area code: +40 x54
- Vehicle reg.: HD
- Website: orasulpetrila.ro

Petrila (Romanian pronunciation: [peˈtrila]; Hungarian: Petrilla) is a town in the Jiu Valley, Hunedoara County, Transylvania, Romania. It is located near the confluence of the rivers Jiul de Est, Taia, and Jieț.

The town administers four villages: Cimpa (Csimpa), Jieț (Zsiec), Răscoala (Reszkola), and Tirici.

== History ==
A Romanian town in the Carpathian Mountains, Petrila is an ancient settlement, but its existence was not documented until 1493 in a donation letter between Vladislav the First, King of Hungary and a Romanian prince named Mihai Cande.

The name of the town was noted in 1733 as coming from the Latin word “petrinus” ("pietros" in Romanian), which can be translated into English to mean “of stone”, a reference to the large coal deposits in the area that would become a profitable export in the Industrial Revolution. The exploitation of coal deposits in and around Petrila made the town grow as a single-industry town, revolving either around the mining of coal or the processing of the coal mined there, which is listed under the grade “Pitcoal”. Mining operations began in 1840, but the town would remain sparsely populated until the arrival of Western Moldavian workers forced to relocate by the former president of Romania Nicolae Ceaușescu under Communist rule. The restructuring of the economy since the Romanian Revolution of 1989 has led to a decrease in production and supply for the region, including Petrila.

It was the site of the Petrila Mine disaster, wherein two methane gas explosions in a coal mine on November 15, 2008 killed at least 12 miners and/or rescue workers. This is not the first time this millennium a coal mine in Petrila has suffered such an incident; another similar incident occurred in 2001.

== Population ==
Historical population
Year	Pop.	±%
1850	2,075	—
1920	10,600	+410.8%
1956	19,955	+88.3%
1966	24,796	+24.3%
1977	25,173	+1.5%
1992	29,302	+16.4%
2002	25,840	−11.8%
2011	22,692	−12.2%
2021	19,600	−13.6%
Source: Census data

At the 2011 census, Petrila had a population of 22,692; of these, 93.97% were Romanians, 4.9% Hungarians, and 0.73% Roma. At the 2021 census, the town had a population of 19,600, of which 88,64% were Romanians and 2.67% Hungarians.

== Notable people ==
- Ludovic Bács (1930–2015), composer
- Ferenc Doór (1918–2015), painter
- Alexandru Hrisanide (1936–2018 ), composer
- Josef Kappl (b. 1950), rock musician
- Horațiu Lasconi (b. 1963), footballer
- Ion Dezideriu Sîrbu (1919–1989), philosopher and novelist
- Maria von Tasnady (1911–2001), actress
- Daniel Timofte (b. 1967), footballer

== See also ==
- Jiu Valley
- Lonea Coal Mine
- Petrila Coal Mine
