= Jiul de Est =

Jiul de Est Jiul Unguresc
- Location within Romania

Location
- Country: Romania
- Counties: Hunedoara County
- Villages: Tirici, Cimpa, Petrila, Petroșani, Iscroni

Physical characteristics
- Source: Șureanu Mountains
- Mouth: Jiu
  - location: Iscroni
  - coordinates: 45°22′07″N 23°22′04″E
  - elevation: 554 m (1,818 ft)
- Length: 29 km (18 mi)
- Basin size: 468 km^{2} (181 sq mi)

Basin features
- Progression: Jiu→ Danube→ Black Sea

The Jiul de Est ("Eastern Jiu", previously also known as Jiul Unguresc) is a headwater of the river Jiu in Romania. Its source is in the Șureanu Mountains. At its confluence with the Jiul de Vest in Iscroni, the Jiu is formed. Its length is 29 km (18 mi) and its basin size is 468 km^{2} (181 sq mi).

Jiul means "the Jiu" (with the definite article -l).

== Tributaries ==
The following rivers are tributaries to the river Jiul de Est:

- Left: Sterminos, Lolea, Câmpa, Jieț, Maleia, Staicu, Sălătruc
- Right: Bilele, Răscoala, Taia, Bănița
