= Malyan, Fars =

Malyan مليان
- Village
- Location within Iran
- Coordinates: 30°00′30″N 52°25′07″E
- Country: Iran
- Province: Fars
- County: Sepidan
- Bakhsh: Beyza
- Rural District: Beyza

Population (2006)
  - Total: 681
- Time zone: UTC+3:30 (IRST)
  - Summer (DST): UTC+4:30 (IRDT)

Malyan (Persian: مليان, also Romanized as Malyān and Maliān) is a village in Beyza Rural District, Beyza District, Sepidan County, Fars province, Iran. At the 2006 census, its population was 681, in 159 families.
