= Buila-Vânturarița National Park =

National park in Romania

- Parcul Național Buila-Vânturarița
- IUCN category II (national park)
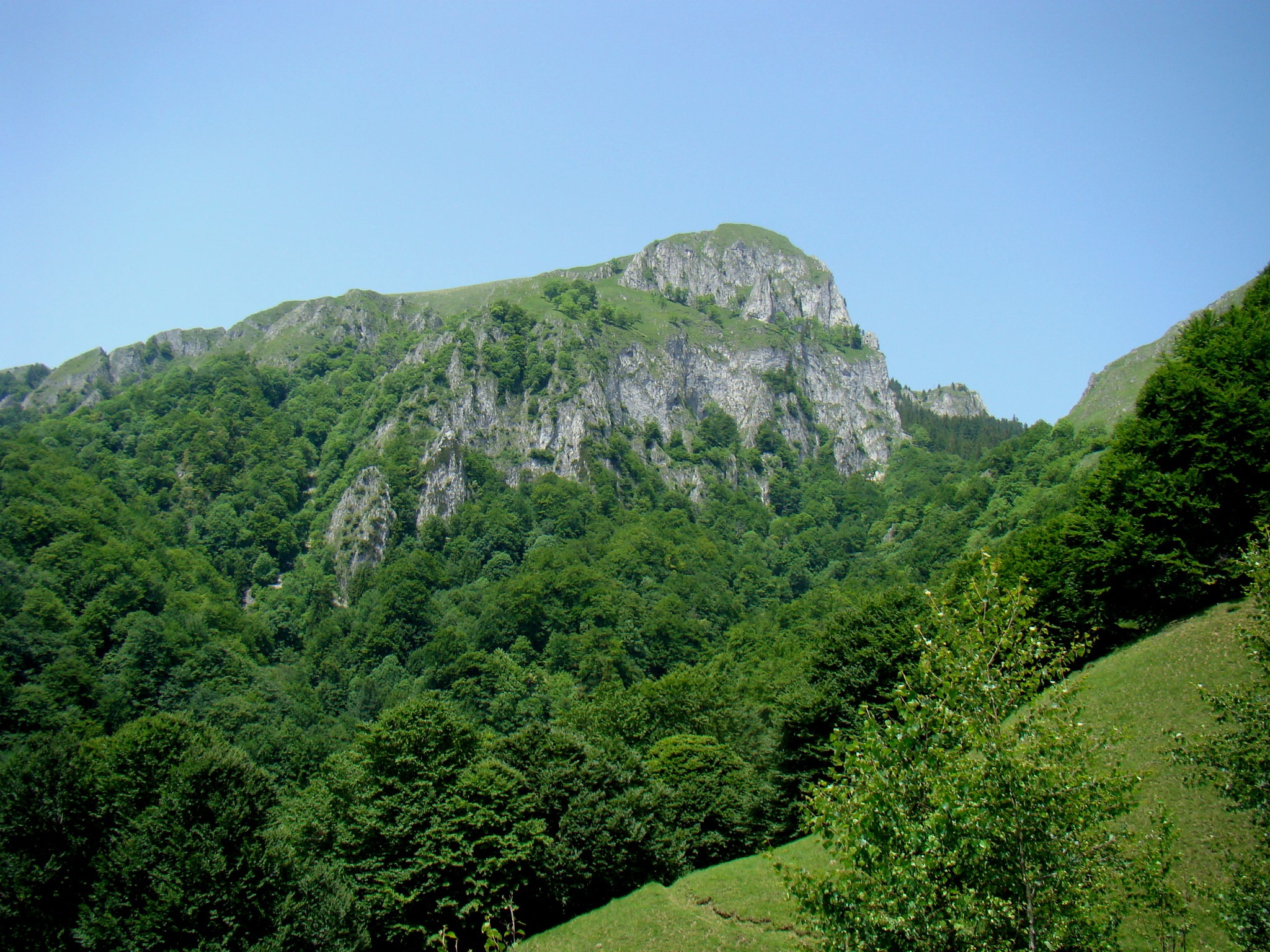
- The Buila Massif

- Location within Romania
- Location: Vâlcea County; Romania
- Nearest city: Băile Olănești
- Coordinates: 45.240°N 24.096°E
- Area: 4,186 hectares (10,340 acres)
- Established: 2005
- Website: buila.ro

The Buila-Vânturarița National Park (Romanian: Parcul Național Buila-Vânturarița) (national park category II IUCN) is a protected area situated in Romania, in the central-northern part of Vâlcea County, in the administrative territory of the localities Costești, Bărbătești, and Băile Olănești.

== Location ==
The Buila-Vânturarița National Park is located in the central-northern part of Vâlcea County in the Căpățânii Mountains, a mountain group included in the Parâng Mountains, a subgroup of mountains in the Southern Carpathians.

== Description ==
Buila-Vânturarița with an area of 4,186 ha (10,340 acres) was declared natural protected area by the Government Decision No 2151 in 2004 (published in Romanian Official Paper No 38 on January 12, 2005) and represents a mountainous area with flora and fauna specific to the Southern Carpathians.

Protected areas included in the park: Trovant Museum, Călinești-Brezoi Forest, Valea Cheii Forest, Rădița-Mânzu, Mount Stogu, Arnăuți Cave, Clopot Cave, Munteanu-Murgoci Cave, Pagoda Cave, Valea Bistrița Cave.

== Flora and fauna ==
Flora and fauna is diverse, many of the species are protected by international conventions.

=== Flora ===
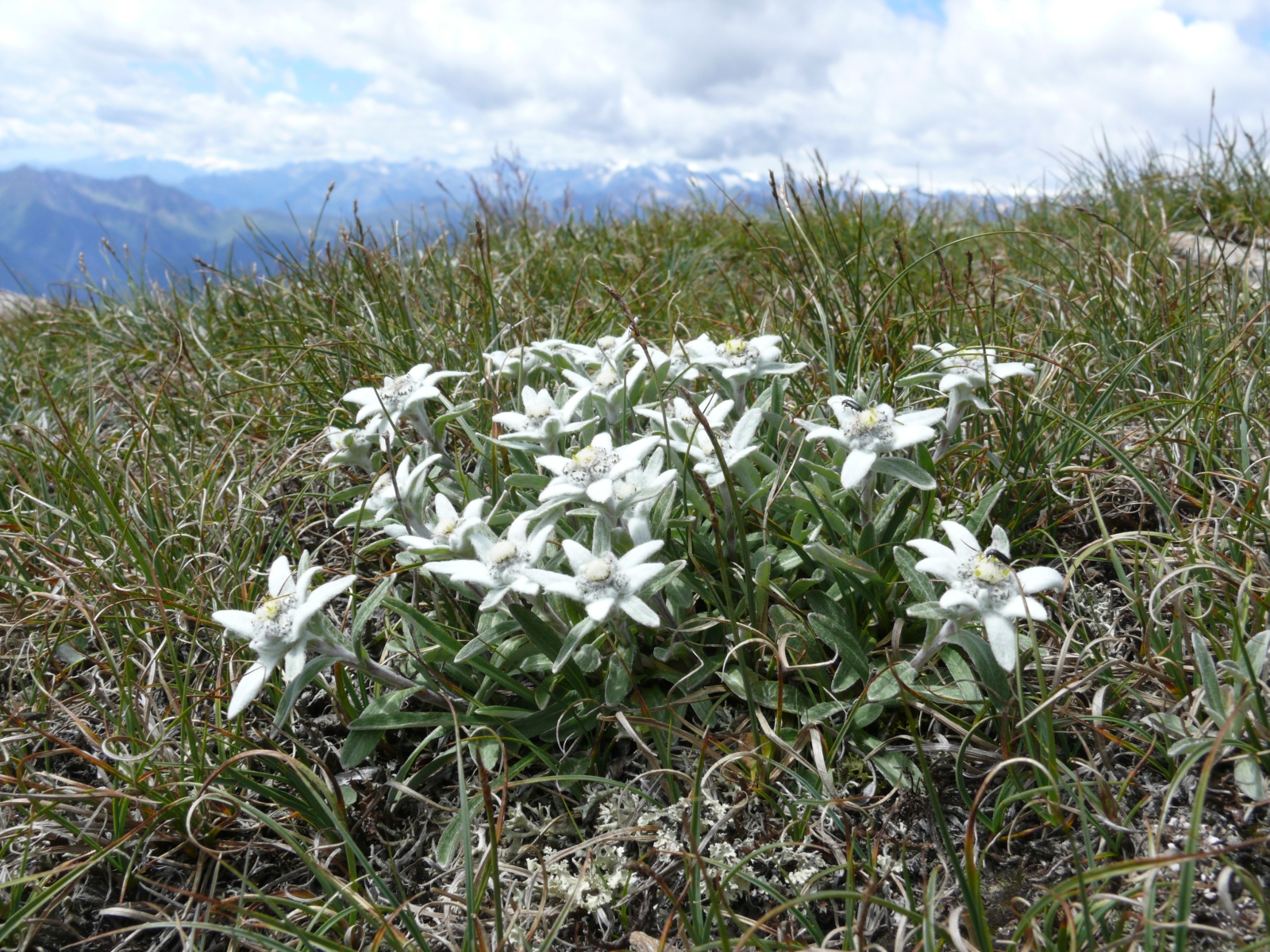
Leontopodium alpinum

Woody plants consist of: English oak (Quercus robur), European beech (Fagus sylvatica), European ash (Fraxinus excelsior), pine (Pinus), Norway spruce (Picea abies), fir (Abies), European yew (Taxus baccata), Scots pine (Pinus sylvestris), linden (Tilia), birch (Betula) and species of shrubs: mountain pine (Pinus mugo), savin (Juniperus sabina) or common juniper (Juniperus communis).

Herbs: Edelweiss (Leontopodium alpinum), lady's slipper (Cypripedium calceolus), mountain bellflower (Campanula alpina), yellow monkshood (Aconitum anthora), belladonna (Atropa belladonna), ligularia (Ligularia sibirica), rustyback (Asplenium ceterach), yellow anemone (Anemone ranunculoides), globe-flower (Trollius europaeus), windflower (Anemone nemorosa), martagon (Lilium martagon), centaurea (Centaurea atropurpurea), daphne (Daphne mezereum)

=== Fauna ===
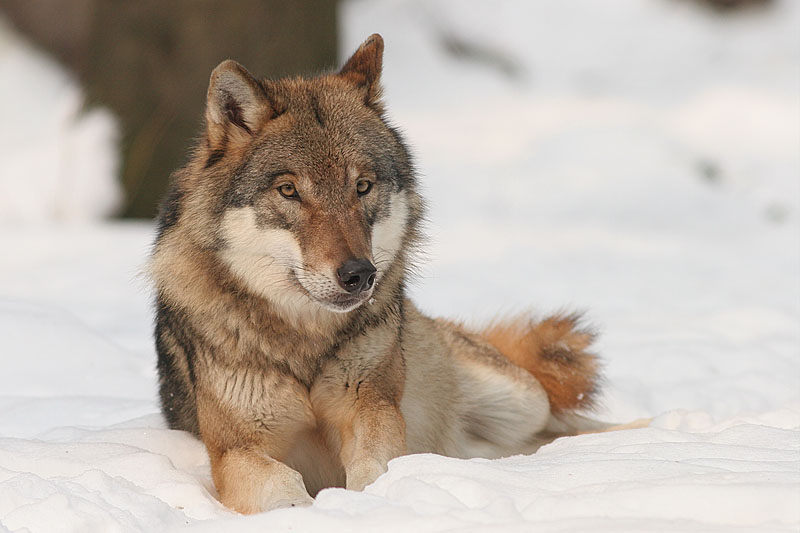
Gray wolf (Canis lupus)

Species of mammals: red deer (Cervus elaphus), brown bear (Ursus arctos), chamois (Rupicapra rupicapra), roe deer (Capreolus capreolus), Eurasian wolf (Canis lupus), wild boar (Sus scrofa), lynx (Lynx lynx), pine marten (Martes martes), squirrel (Sciurus vulgaris), badger (Meles meles), barbastelle (Barrbastella barbastellus), lesser mouse-eared bat (Myotis blythii), brown long-eared bat (Plecotus auritus);

Species of birds: western capercaillie (Tetrao urogallus), white-crowned wheatear (Oenanthe leucopyga), red kite (Milvus milvus), red-footed falcon (Falco vespertinus), white wagtail (Motacilla alba), European nightjar (Caprimulgus europaeus), rock bunting (Emberiza cia), lesser spotted eagle (Aquila pomarina), wallcreeper (Tichodroma muraria), hoopoe (Upupa epops),

Reptiles, amphibians and frogs: green lizard (Lacerta viridis), common European adder (Vipera berus), smooth snake (Coronella austriaca), fire salamander (Salamandra salamandra), alpine newt (Triturus alpestris), common toad (Bufo bufo), yellow-bellied toad (Bombina variegata) or common frog (Rana temporaria).

== Access ==
- European route E81 București – Corbii Mari – Pitești – Morărești – Râmnicu Vâlcea – national road DN64 – Vlăduceni – Valea Cheii – county road DJ654 – Cheia
- National road DN7 Sibiu – Tălmaciu – Câinenii Mari – Călinești – national road DN7A – Brezoi – Brădișor Lake.

== Gallery ==
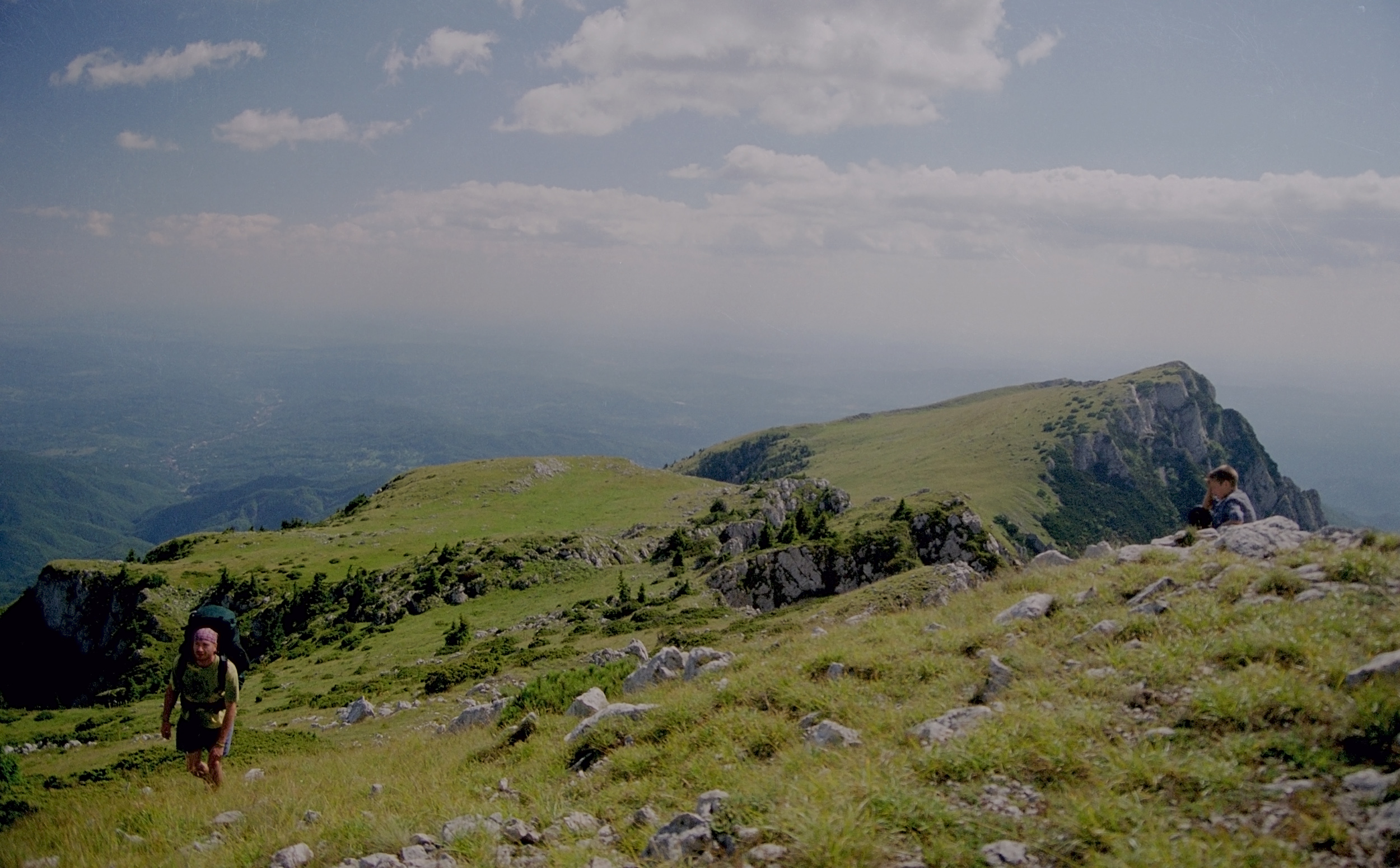
summit ridge

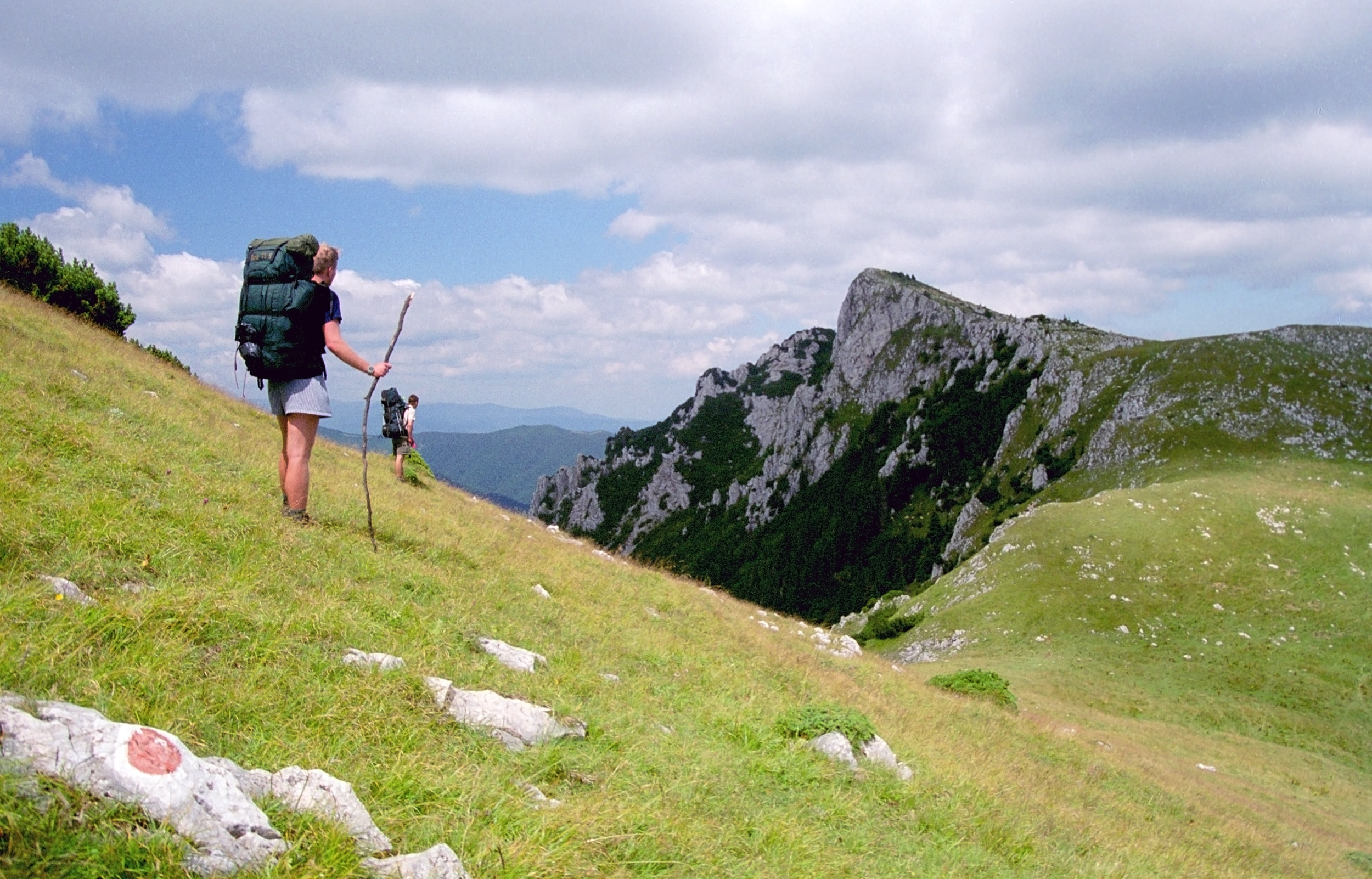
summit ridge way

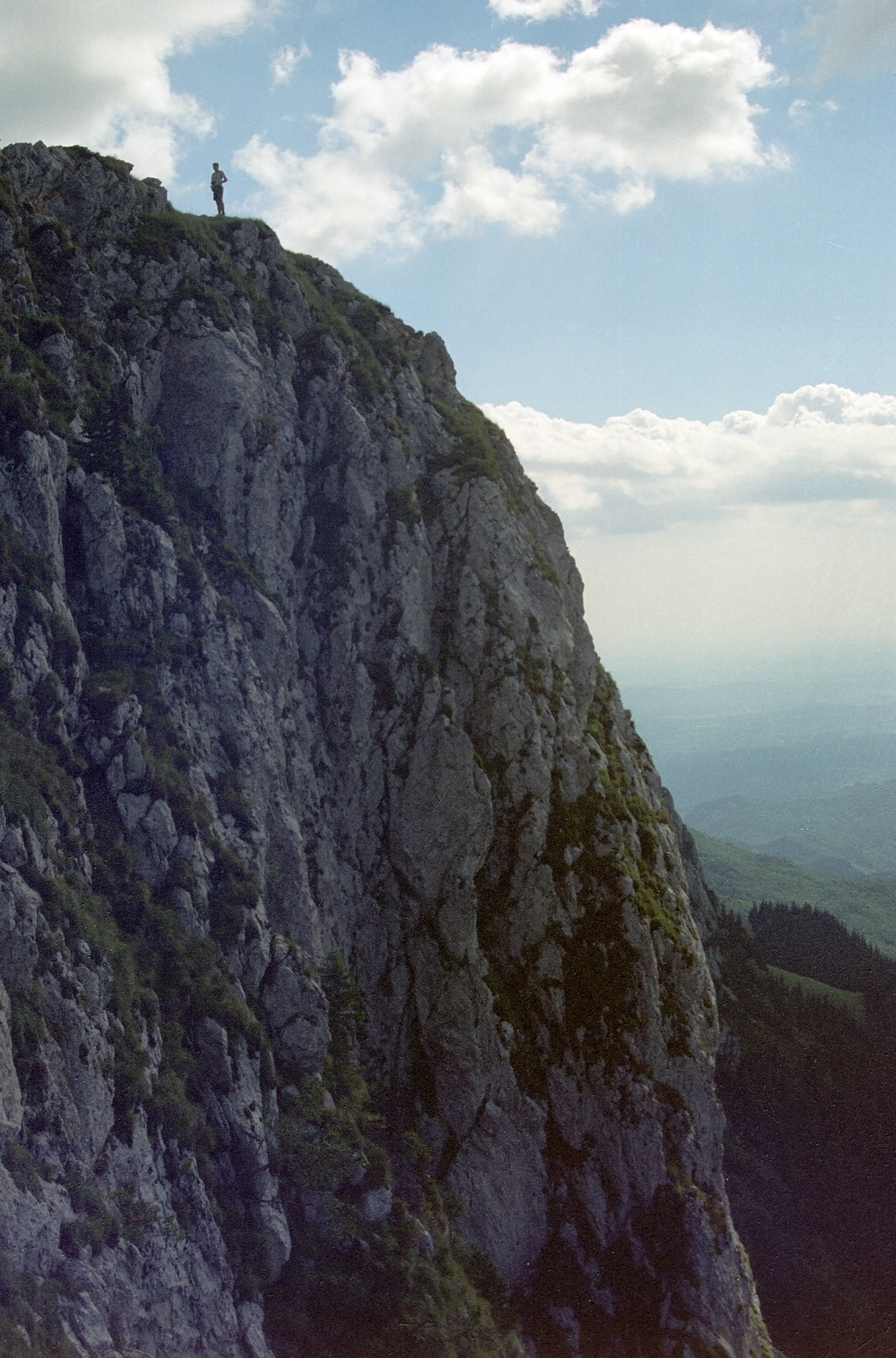
Vânturariţa Mare Peak (1885m)

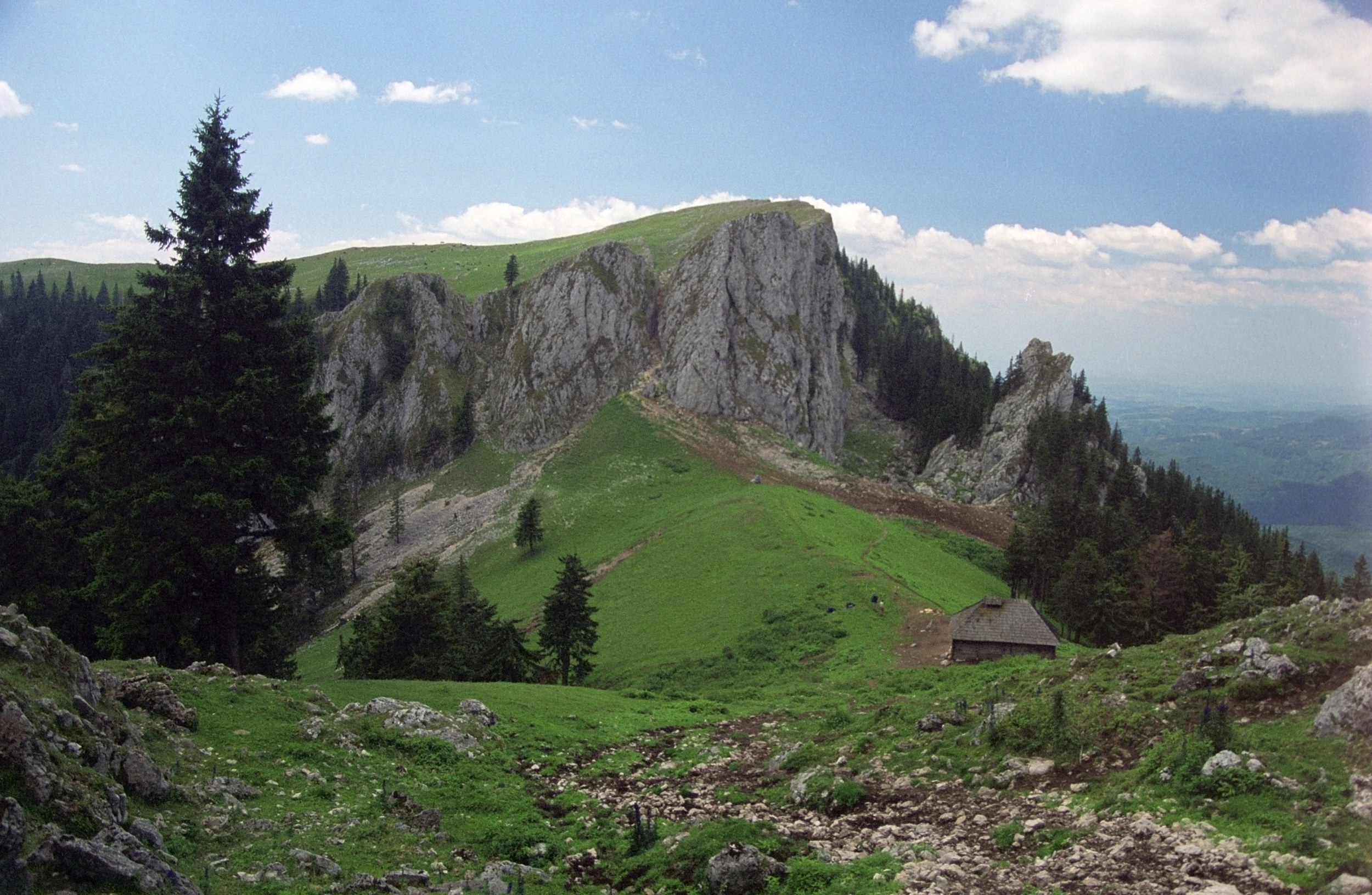
mountain pass Curmătura Builei

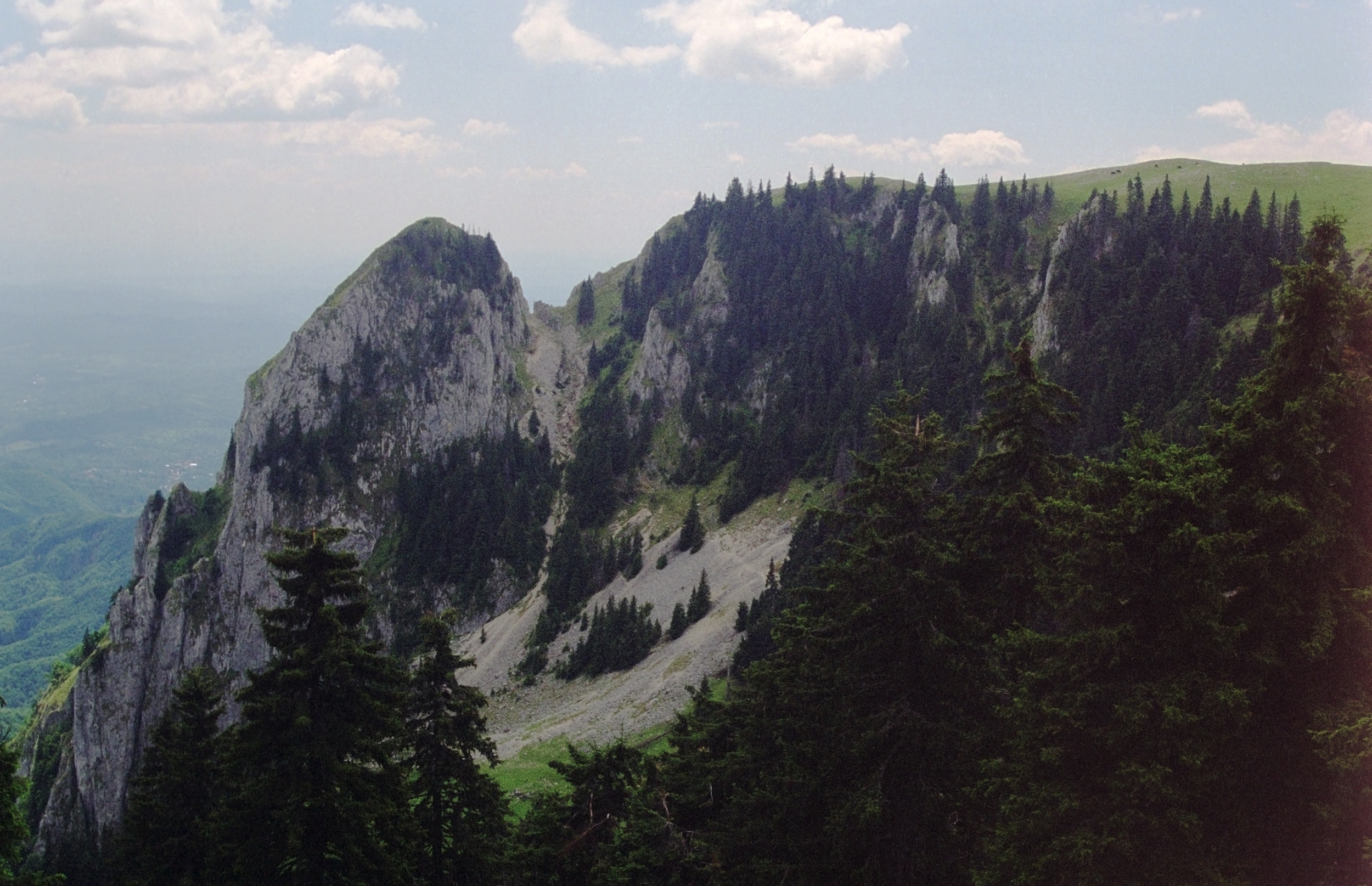

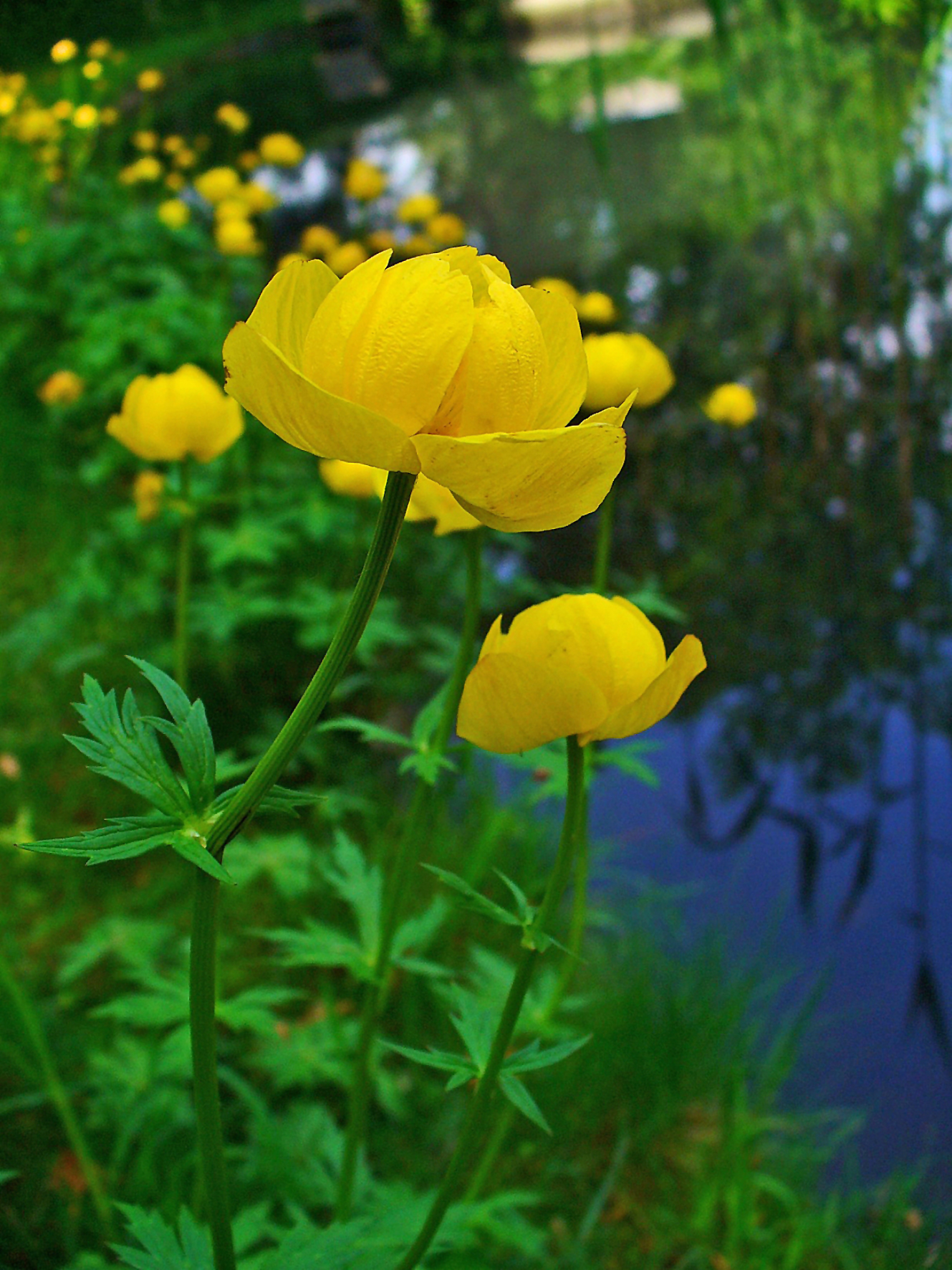
globe-flower

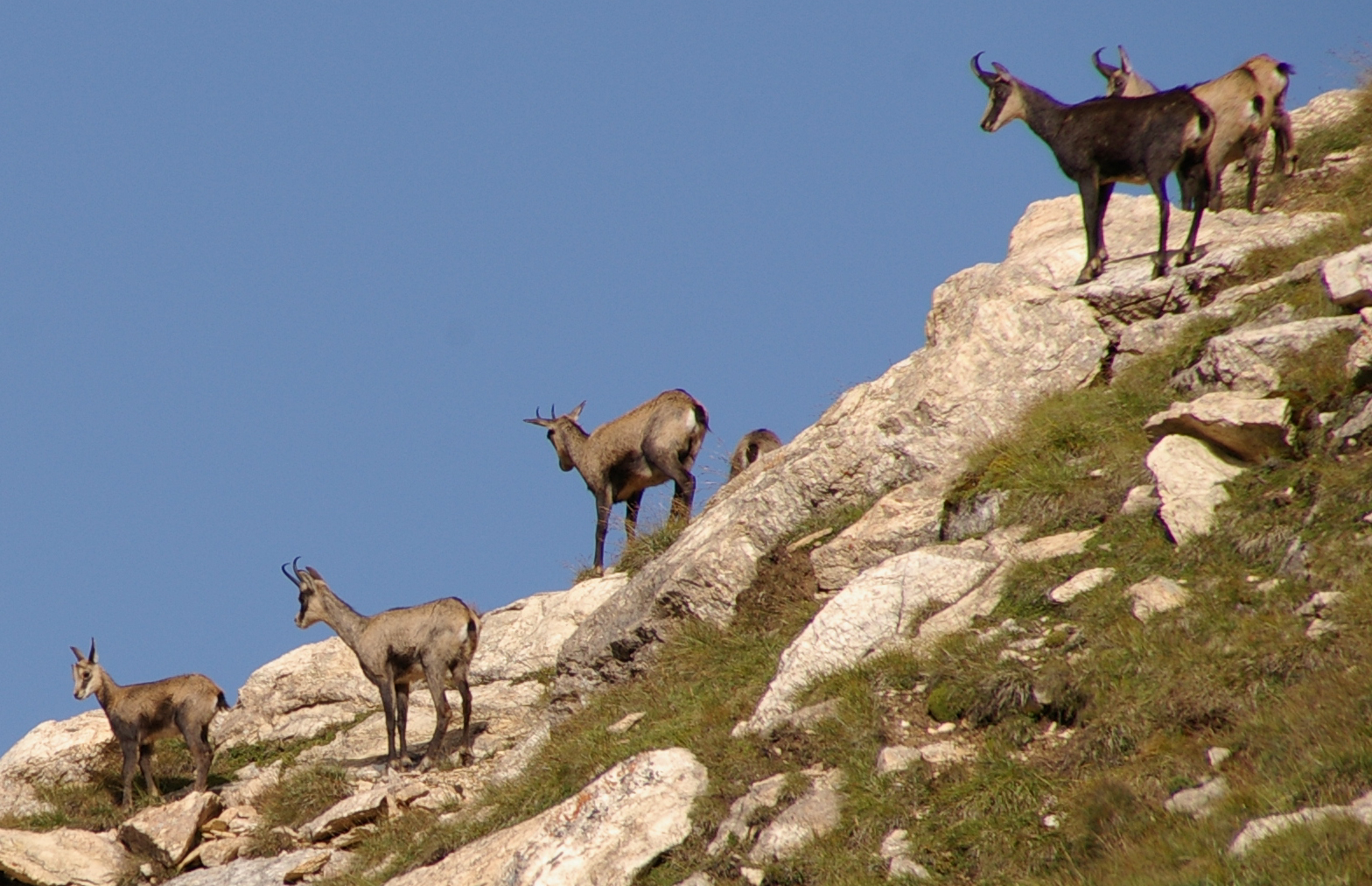
Rupicapra rupicapra

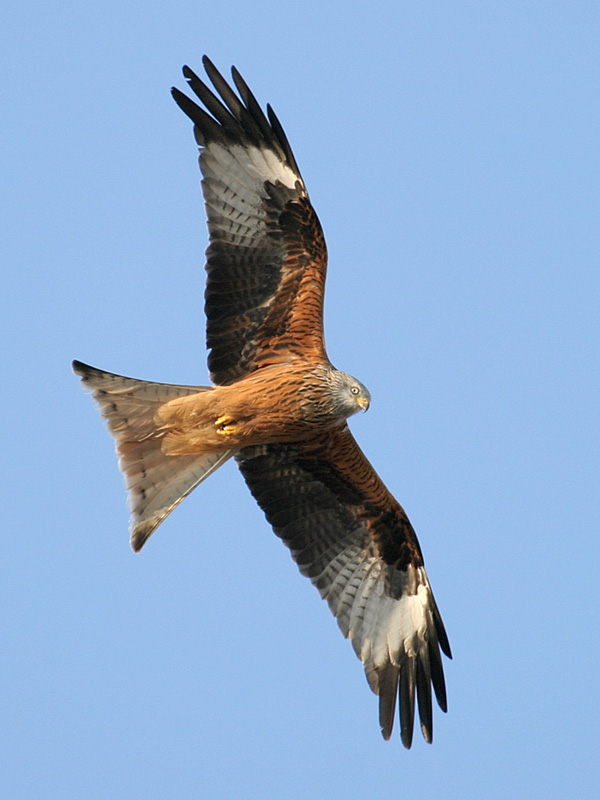
Milvus milvus

== See also ==
- Cozia National Park
- Protected areas of Romania
