= Mount Stogu =

Protected area in Romania

- Muntele Stogu
- IUCN category IV (habitat/species management area)
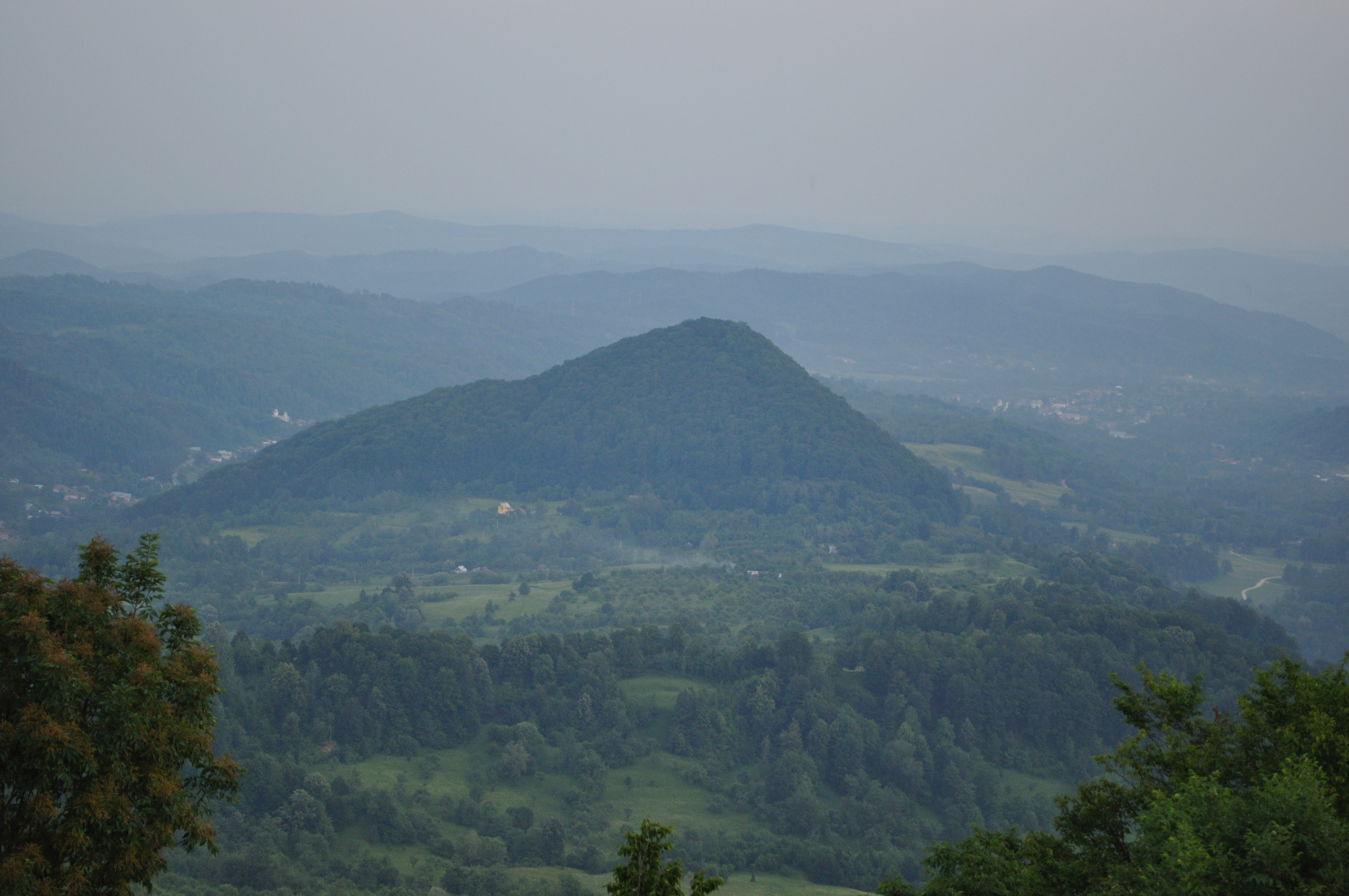
- Mount Stogu

- Location within Romania
- Location: Vâlcea County, Romania
- Nearest city: Băile Olăneşti
- Coordinates: 45°16′58″N 24°07′47″E
- Area: 10.00 hectares (24.7 acres)
- Established: 2000, designation 1983

Mount Stogu (Romanian: Muntele Stogu) is a protected area (nature reserve IUCN category IV) situated in the administrative territory of Băile Olăneşti, in Vâlcea County within east Romania.

== Description ==
Mount Stogu with an area of 10 ha was declared natural protected area by the Law Number. 5 of March 6, 2000 and represents a mountainous area and with diversified landforms, with flora and fauna specific Southern Carpathians.

== Flora and fauna ==
=== Flora ===
Vegetation of forest consists of: European beech (Fagus sylvatica), English oak (Quercus robur), European ash (Fraxinus), fir (Abies), Norway spruce (Picea abies), pine (Pinus) and the species of shrubs.

Species of grass: lady's slipper (Cypripedium calceolus), ligularia (Ligularia sibirica), bellflower of mountain (Campanula alpina), yellow monkshood (Aconitum antthora), belladonna (Atropa belladonna), rustyback (Asplenium ceterach), windflower (Anemone nemorosa), yellow anemone (Anemone ranunculoides), common moonwort (Botrychium lunaria), ivy white (Daphne blagayana), crown vetch (Coronilla varia).

=== Fauna ===
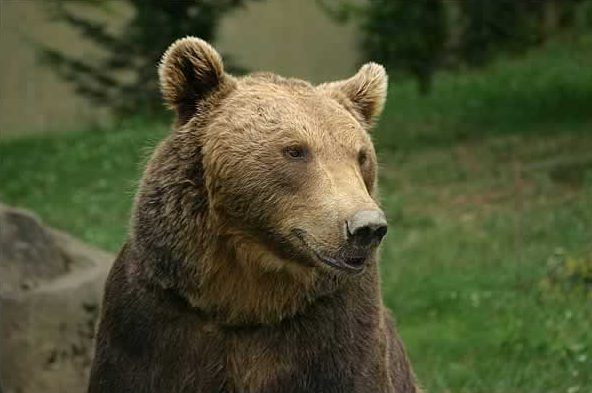
Brown bear

Species of mammals: brown bear (Ursus arctos), deer (Cervus elaphus), roe deer (Capreolus capreolus), gray wolf (Canis lupus), wild boar (Sus scrofa), lynx (lynx lynx), fox (vulpes vulpes), pine marten (Martes martes), squirrel (Sciurus carolinensis), alpine shrew (Sorex alpinus), brown long-eared bat (Plecotus auritus), lesser mouse-eared bat (Myotis blythii), barbastelle (Barbastella barbastellus);

Species of birds: western capercaillie (Tetrao urogallus), rock bunting (Emberiza cia), white-crowned wheatear (Oenanthe leucopyga), lesser spotted eagle (Aquila pomarina), wallcreeper (Tichodroma muraria), hoopoe (Upupa epops).

== Images gallery ==
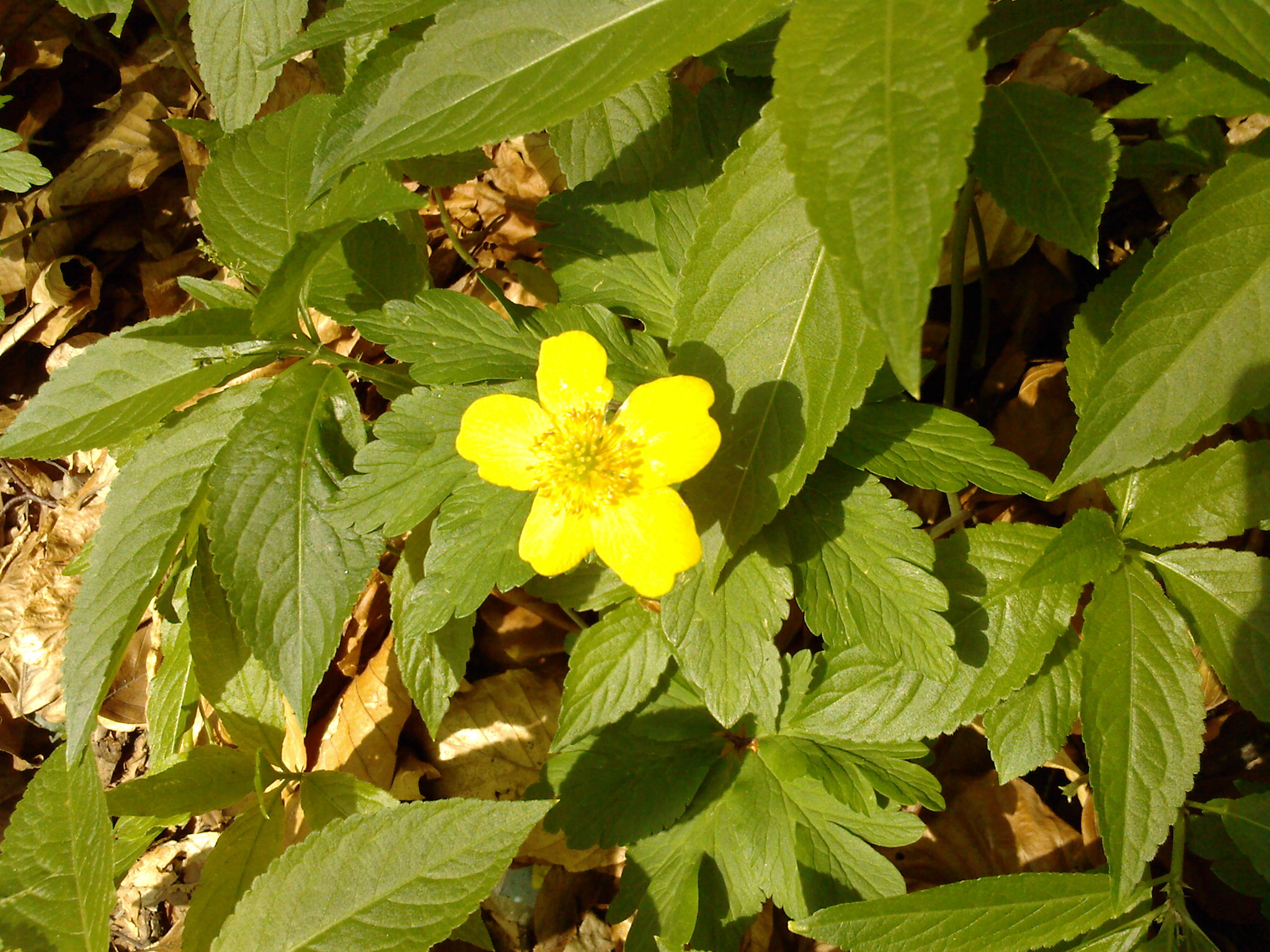
Anemone ranunculoides

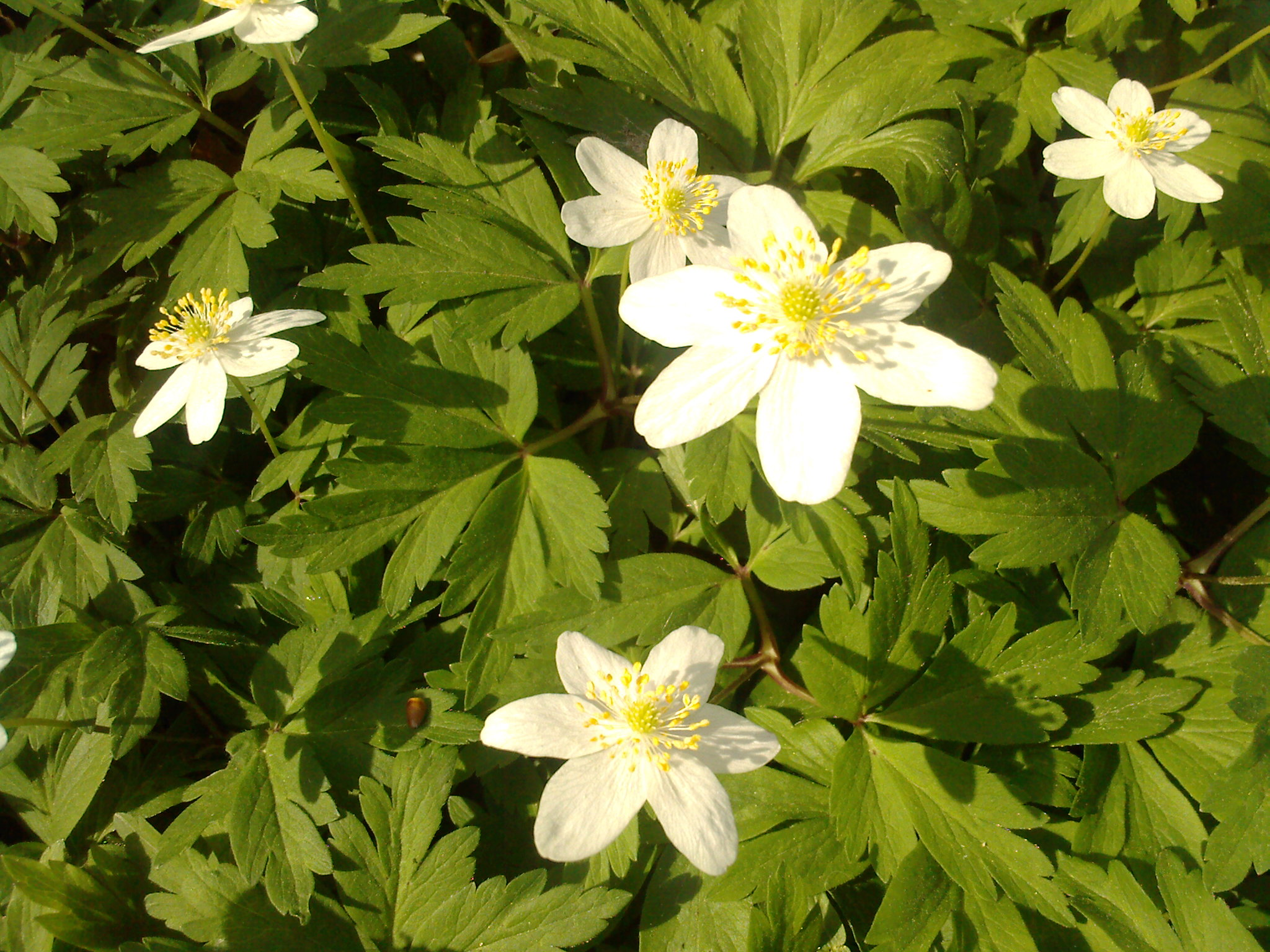
Anemone nemorosa

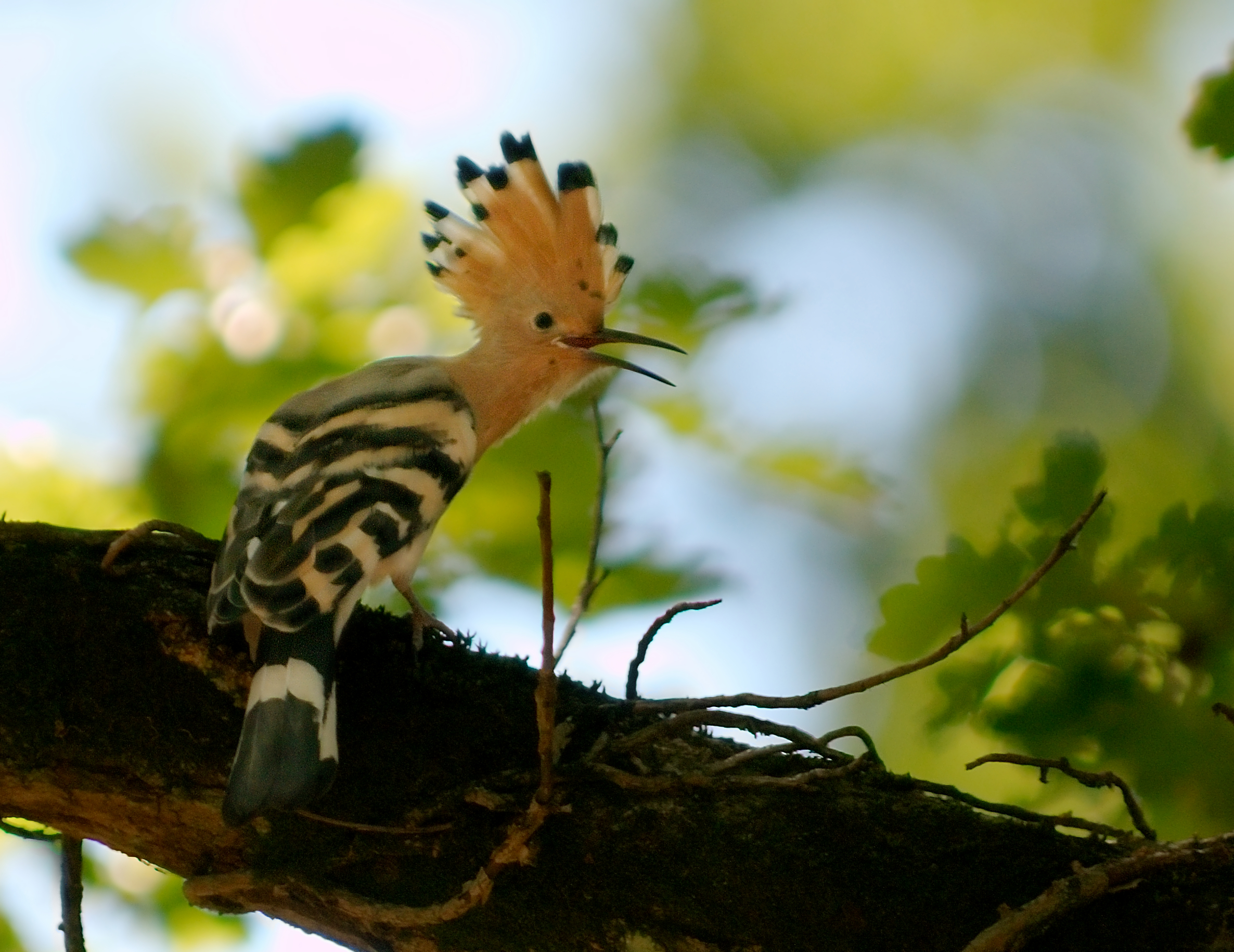
Hoopoe
