= Cheia (Olănești) =

- Location within Romania

Location
- Country: Romania
- Counties: Vâlcea County
- Villages: Cheia

Physical characteristics
- Mouth: Olănești
  - coordinates: 45.1554°N 24.2512°E
- Length: 25 km (16 mi)
- Basin size: 80 km^{2} (31 sq mi)

Basin features
- Progression: Olănești→ Olt→ Danube→ Black Sea

The Cheia is a right tributary of the river Olănești in Romania. It flows into the Olănești in Valea Cheii. Its length is 25 km (16 mi) and its basin size is 80 km^{2} (31 sq mi).

== Tributaries ==
The following rivers are tributaries of the river Cheia (from source to mouth):

- Left: Silița
- Right: Valea Rece, Comarnice, Ionaș, Valea Neagră, Cracu Tisei, Lunga, Capu
