= Păușești-Măglași =

- Commune
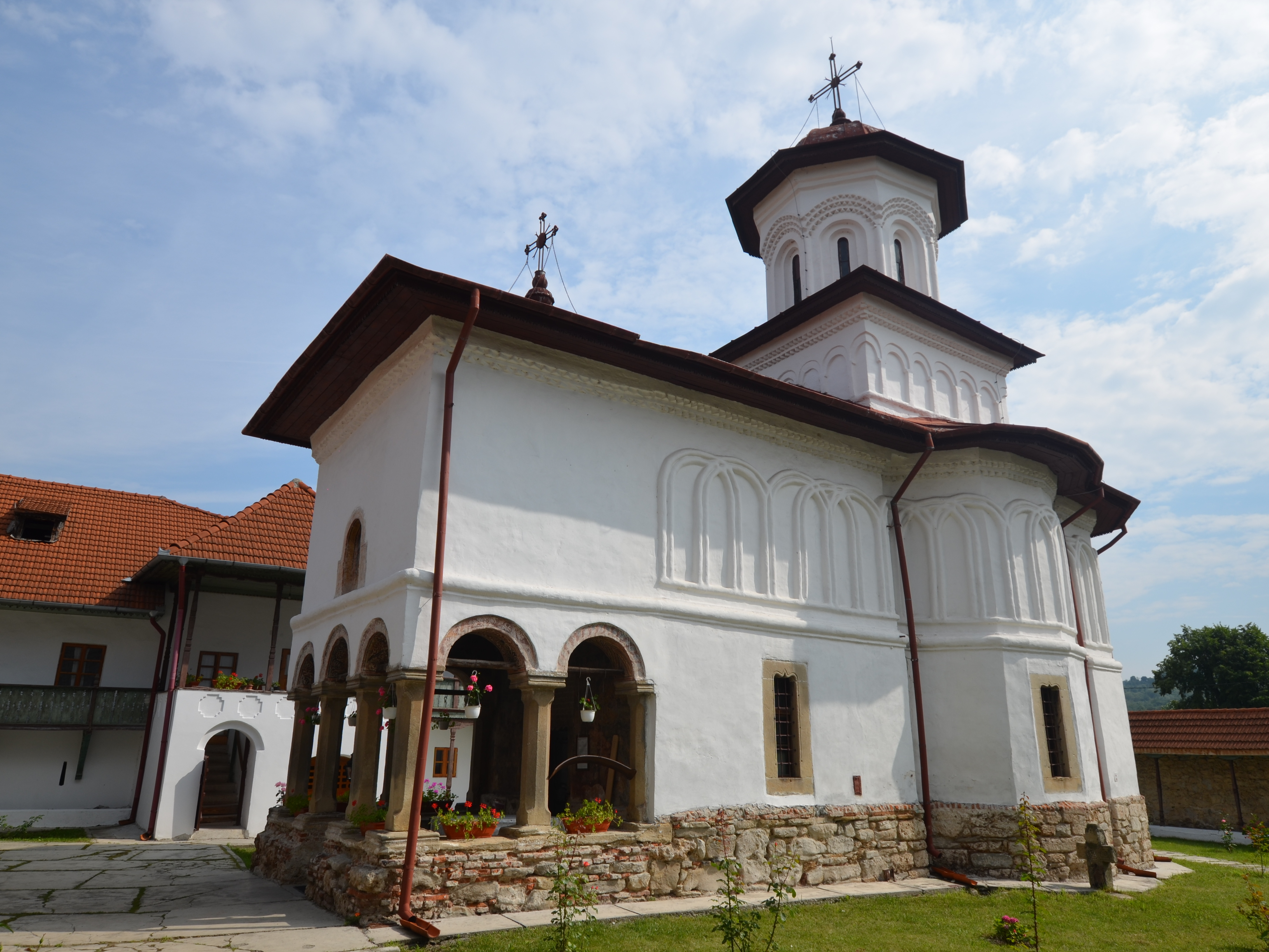
- Sărăcinești Monastery in Valea Cheii

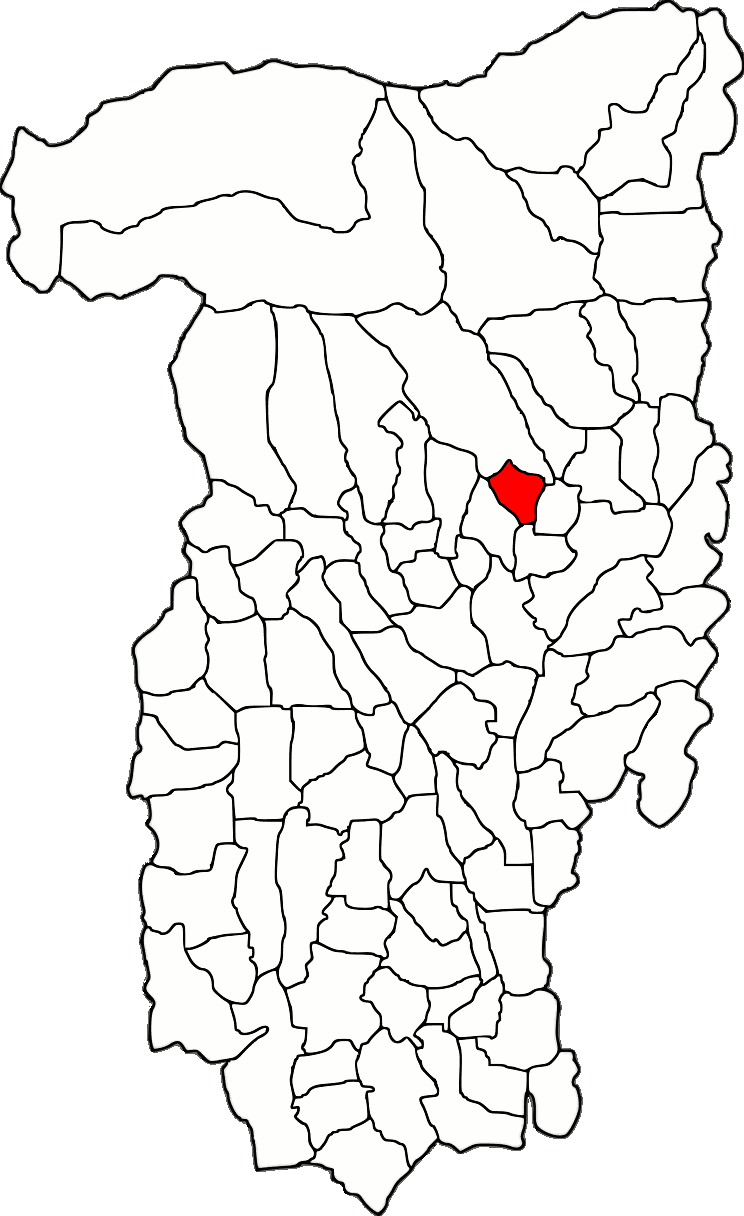
- Location in Vâlcea County

- Location in Romania
- Coordinates: 45°8′N 24°15′E
- Country: Romania
- County: Vâlcea

Government
  - Mayor (2020–2024): Alexandru-Dorel Dediu (PNL)
- Area: 32 km^{2} (12 sq mi)
- Elevation: 342 m (1,122 ft)
- Population (2021-12-01): 3,929
  - Density: 120/km^{2} (320/sq mi)
- Time zone: UTC+02:00 (EET)
  - Summer (DST): UTC+03:00 (EEST)
- Postal code: 247470
- Vehicle reg.: VL
- Website: www.primariapausesti-maglasi.ro

Păușești-Măglași is a commune located in Vâlcea County, Oltenia, Romania. It is composed of six villages: Coasta, Păușești-Măglași, Pietrari, Ulmețel, Valea Cheii, and Vlăduceni.

The commune is located in the central-northern part of the county, on the banks of the Olănești River, in the hilly area south of the Parâng Mountains. It lies at a distance of 10 km (6.2 mi) from the county seat, Râmnicu Vâlcea and is crossed by national road DN64. Păușești-Măglași borders the town of Băile Olănești to the north, Stoenești commune to the west, Bunești commune and the town of Ocnele Mari to the south, and Vlădești commune to the east.

The Romanian Orthodox Sărăcinești Monastery, built in 1688, is located in Valea Cheii village. Just north of the commune is the Buila-Vânturarița National Park.
