= Săpunari =

Săpunari may refer to several villages in Romania:

- Săpunari, a village in Morărești Commune, Argeș County
- Săpunari, a village in Lehliu Commune, Călărași County
