= Bărbătești, Vâlcea =

Bărbătești
- Commune
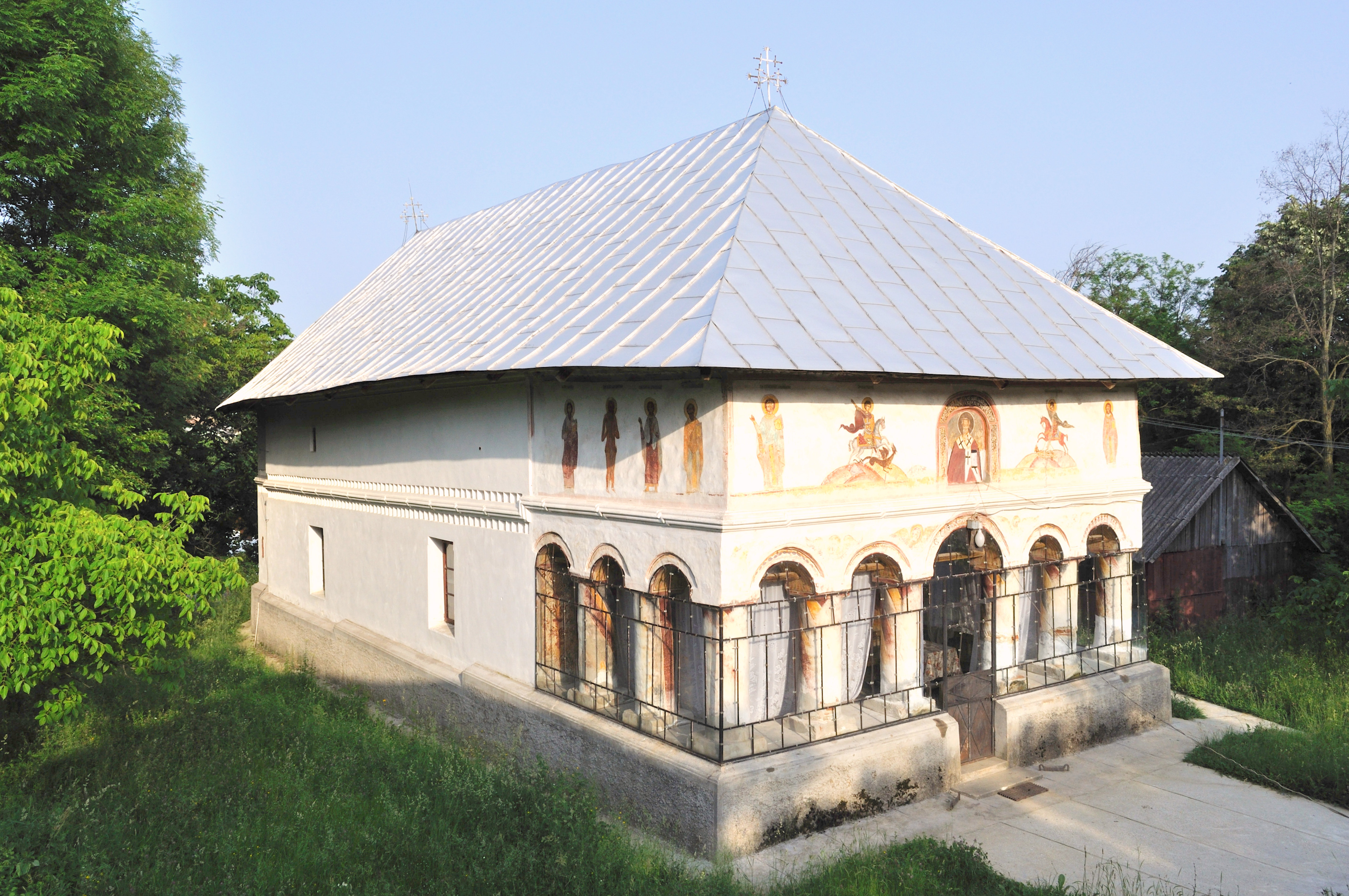
- Saint Nicholas Church in Bărbătești village

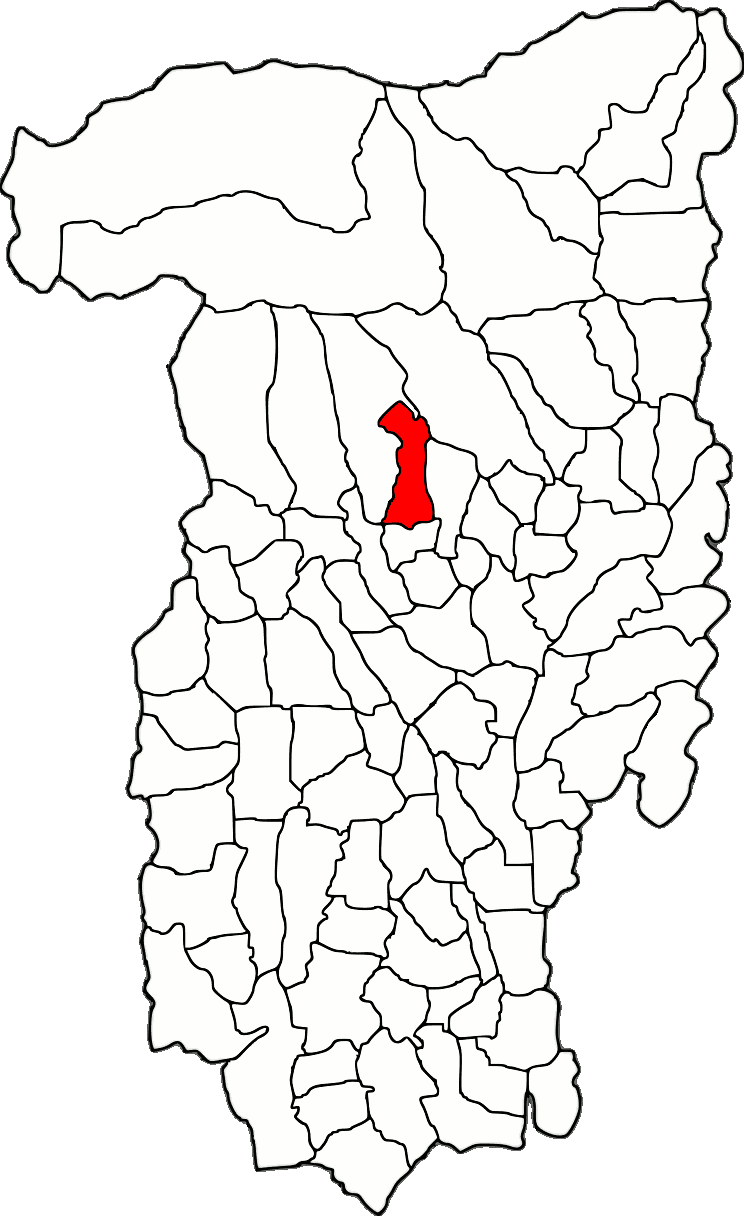
- Location in Vâlcea County

- Location in Romania
- Coordinates: 45°09′N 24°07′E
- Country: Romania
- County: Vâlcea

Government
  - Mayor (2020–2024): Constantin Bănacu (PSD)
- Area: 41.25 km^{2} (15.93 sq mi)
- Elevation: 480 m (1,570 ft)
- Population (2021-12-01): 2,853
  - Density: 69.16/km^{2} (179.1/sq mi)
- Time zone: UTC+02:00 (EET)
  - Summer (DST): UTC+03:00 (EEST)
- Postal code: 247027
- Area code: (+40) 0250
- Vehicle reg.: VL
- Website: primariabarbatesti.ro

Bărbătești is a commune located in Vâlcea County, Oltenia, Romania. It is composed of four villages: Bodești, Bărbătești, Bârzești, and Negrulești.

The commune is situated in the central part of the county, 35 km (22 mi) from the county seat, Râmnicu Vâlcea. It borders to the north and west Costești commune, to the south Pietrari commune, and to the east Stoenești commune and the town of Băile Olănești.

Part of the Buila-Vânturarița National Park is situated on the territory of the commune.

Historical population
Year	Pop.	±%
2002	3,861	—
2011	3,318	−14.1%
2021	2,853	−14.0%
Source: Census data

== Natives ==
- Nadia Ileana Bogorin (born 1940), First Lady of Romania from 1996 to 2000
