= Dedulești =

Deduleşti may refer to several villages in Romania:

- Deduleşti, a village in Morărești Commune, Argeș County
- Deduleşti, a village in Mircea Vodă, Brăila
- Deduleşti, a village in Topliceni Commune, Buzău County
