= Bunești =

Bunești may refer to several places in Romania:

- Bunești, Brașov, a commune in Brașov County
- Bunești, Suceava, a commune in Suceava County
- Bunești, Vâlcea, a commune in Vâlcea County
- Bunești, a village in Cotmeana Commune, Argeș County
- Bunești, a village in Mălureni Commune, Argeș County
- Bunești, a village in Mintiu Gherlii Commune, Cluj County
- Bunești, a village in Balșa Commune, Hunedoara County
- Bunești, a village in Bunești-Averești Commune, Vaslui County
