= Coasta Mare =

Coasta Mare may refer to several villages in Romania:

- Coasta Mare, a village in Râciu Commune, Mureș County
- Coasta Mare, a village in Bunești, Vâlcea
