= Olănești (river) =

- Location within Romania

Location
- Country: Romania
- Counties: Vâlcea County
- Villages: Băile Olănești, Păușești-Măglași, Vlădești, Râmnicu Vâlcea

Physical characteristics
- Mouth: Olt
  - location: Râmnicu Vâlcea
  - coordinates: 45.0971°N 24.3784°E
- Length: 41 km (25 mi)
- Basin size: 237 km^{2} (92 sq mi)

Basin features
- Progression: Olt→ Danube→ Black Sea
- Tributaries
  - left: Stoia, Pârâul Câinelui, Comanca
  - right: Izvoarele, Cheia, Debrădet

The Olănești is a right tributary of the river Olt in Romania. It discharges into the Olt in the city Râmnicu Vâlcea. Its length is 41 km (25 mi) and its basin size is 237 km^{2} (92 sq mi).
