= Vlădești, Vâlcea =

Vlădești
- Commune
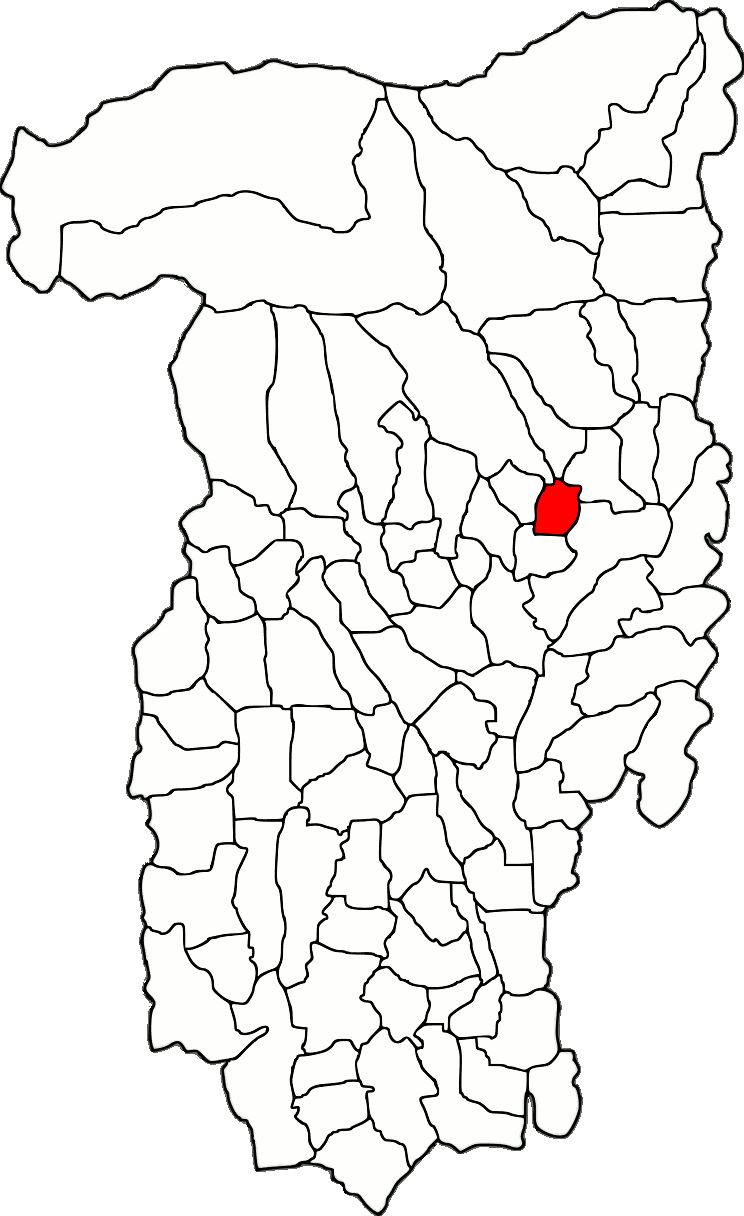
- Location in Vâlcea County

- Location in Romania
- Coordinates: 45°7′10″N 24°18′15″E
- Country: Romania
- County: Vâlcea
- Population (2021-12-01): 3,330
- Time zone: UTC+02:00 (EET)
  - Summer (DST): UTC+03:00 (EEST)
- Vehicle reg.: VL

Vlădești is a commune located in Vâlcea County, Oltenia, Romania. It is composed of five villages: Fundătura, Pleașa, Priporu, Trundin and Vlădești.
