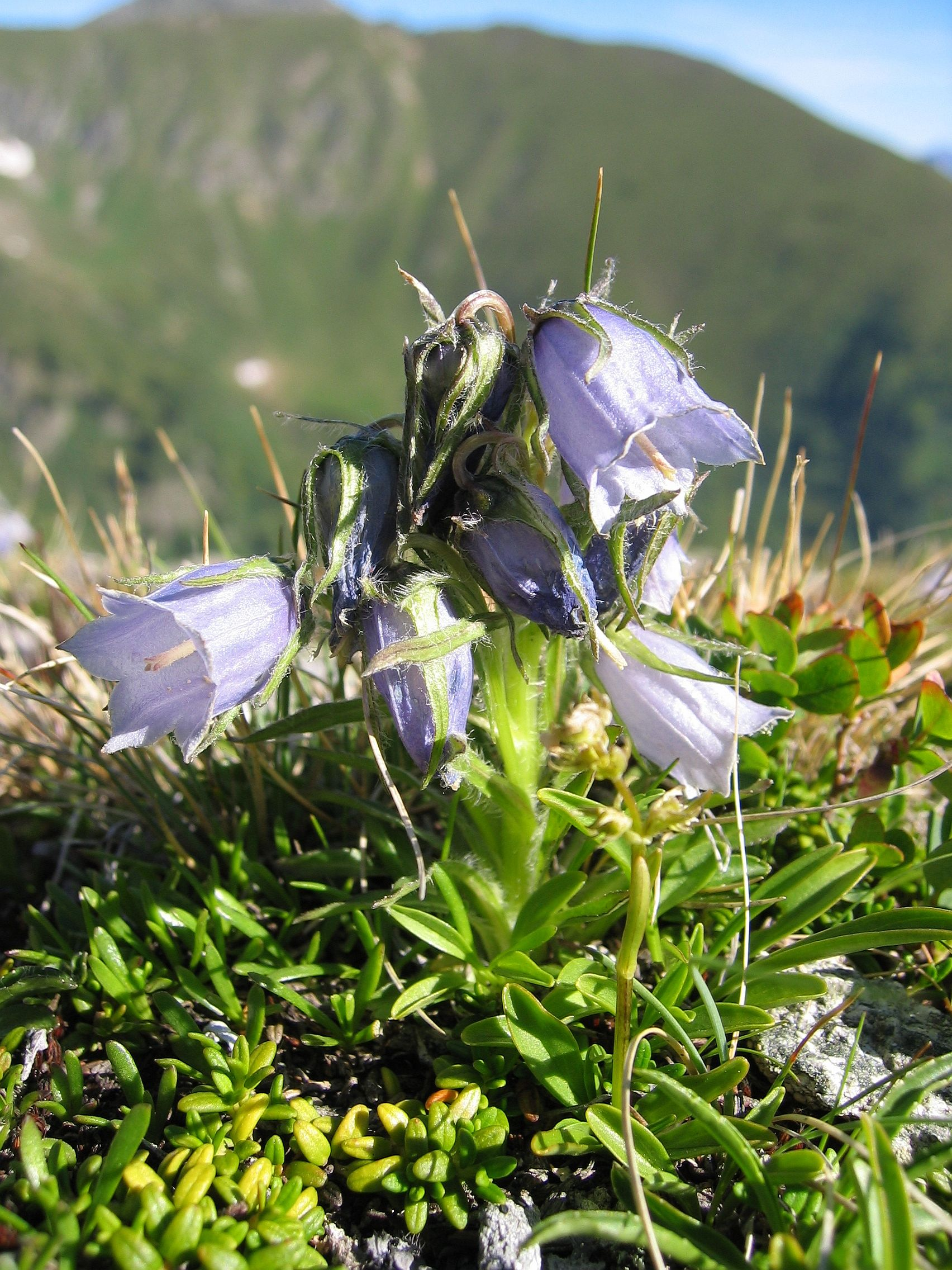

Scientific classification
- Kingdom: Plantae
- Clade: Tracheophytes
- Clade: Angiosperms
- Clade: Eudicots
- Clade: Asterids
- Order: Asterales
- Family: Campanulaceae
- Genus: Campanula
- Species: C. alpina

Binomial name
- Campanula alpina Jacq.

= Campanula alpina =

Alpine Bellflower

Species of flowering plant

Campanula alpina, known as the alpine bellflower, is a species of perennial bellflower found in the Eastern Alps, Carpathian Mountains and the Balkans. It comprises two subspecies: subsp. alpina found in the Eastern Alps and Carpathians, and subsp. orbelica found in the Balkans.
