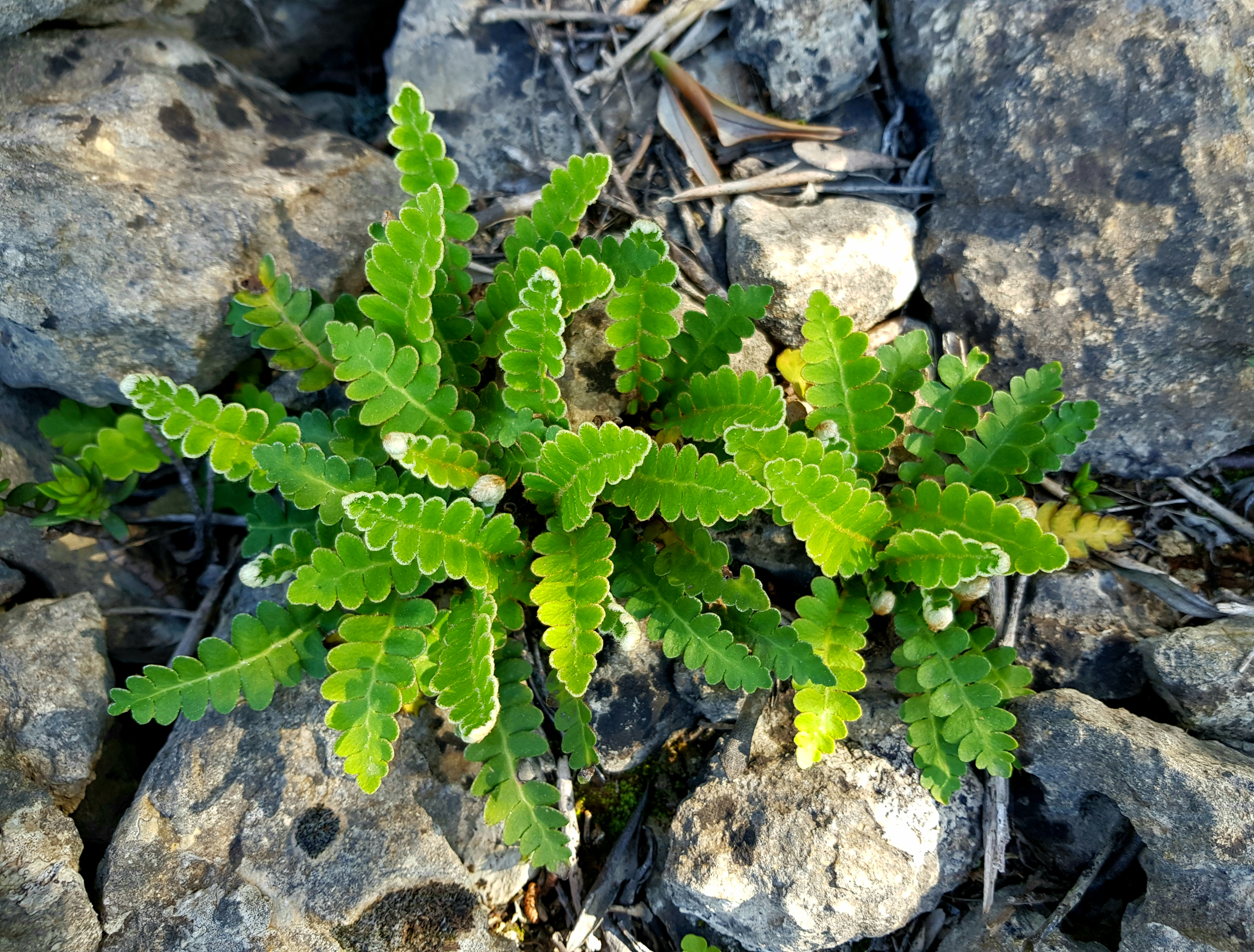

Conservation status
- Least Concern (IUCN 3.1)

Scientific classification
- Kingdom: Plantae
- Clade: Embryophytes
- Clade: Tracheophytes
- Division: Polypodiophyta
- Class: Polypodiopsida
- Order: Polypodiales
- Suborder: Aspleniineae
- Family: Aspleniaceae
- Genus: Asplenium
- Species: A. ceterach

Binomial name
- Asplenium ceterach L.

Synonyms
- Asplenium sinuatum Salisb.; Ceterach ceterach (L.) Newman; Ceterach officinarum Willd.; Hemidictyum ceterach (L.) Bedd.; Notolepeum ceterach (L.) Newman; Scolopendrium ceterach (L.) Symons; Grammitis ceterach (L.) Sw.; Gymnopteris ceterach (L.) Bernh.; Gymnogramma ceterach (L.) Spreng.; Vittaria ceterach (L.) Bernh.

= Asplenium ceterach =

Rustyback Fern

Species of fern

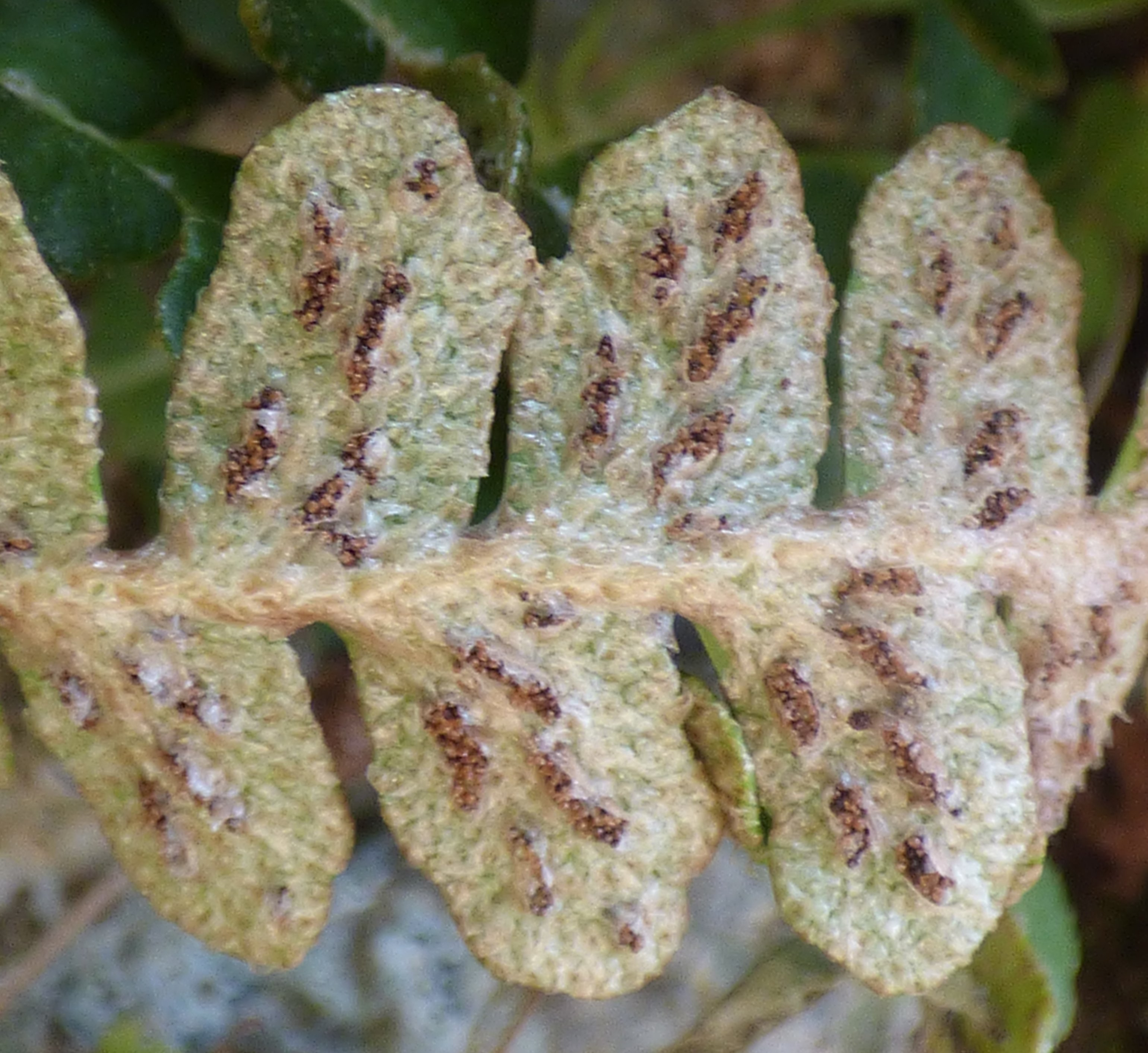
Sori and scales, Asplenium ceterach from Antalya in Turkey

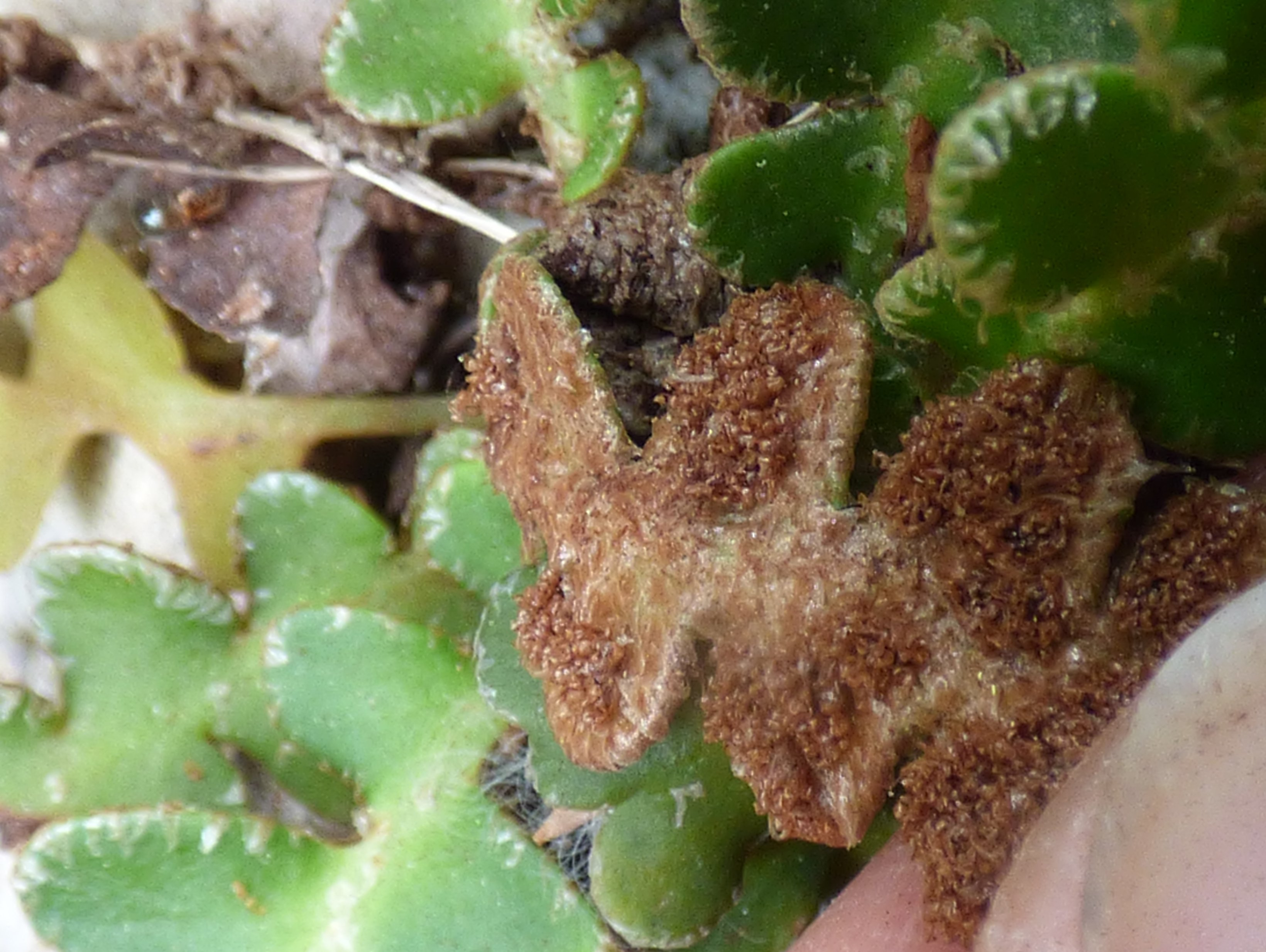
Sori and scales, Asplenium ceterach from Antalya in Turkey

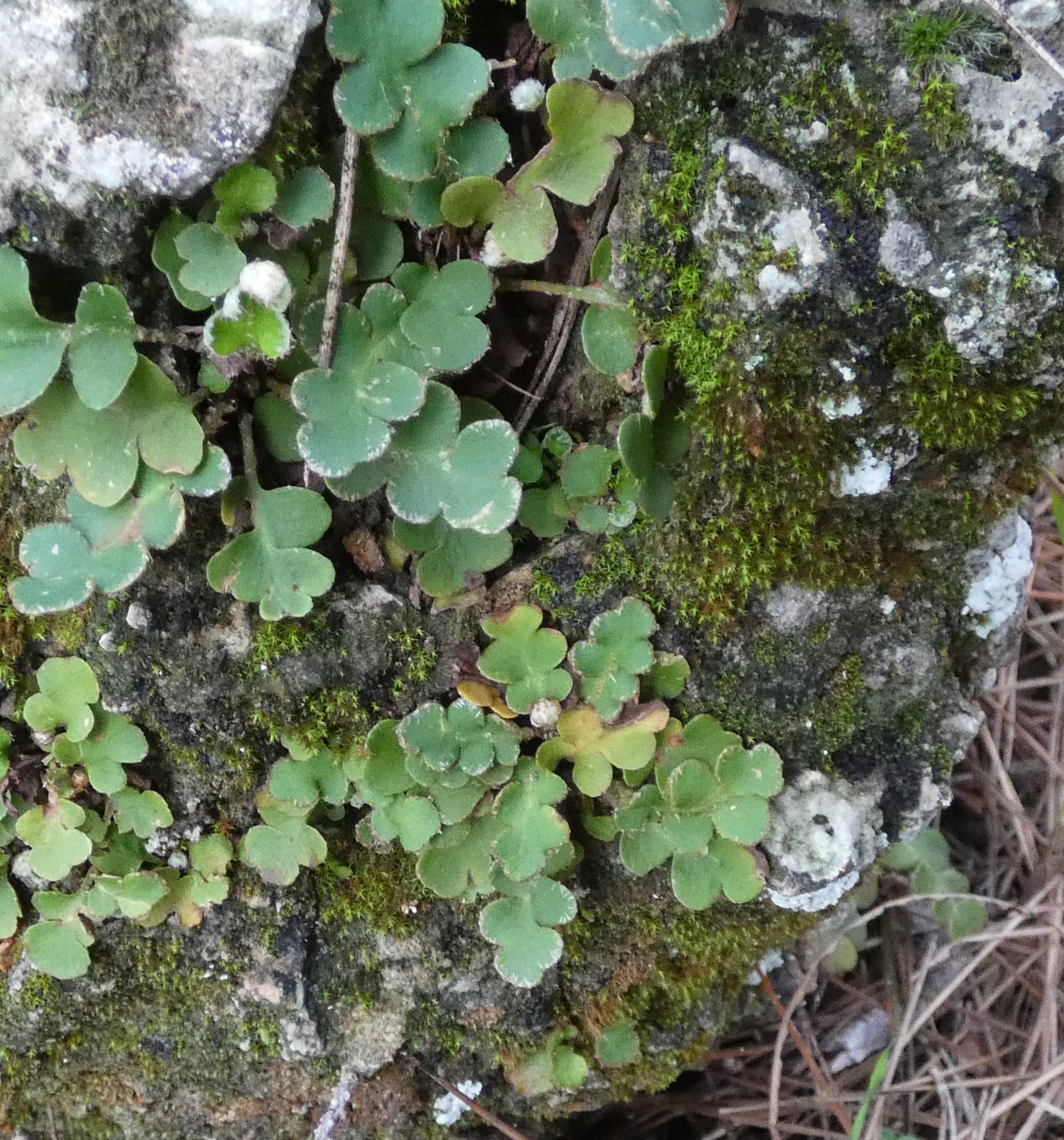
Young Asplenium ceterach from Antalya in Turkey

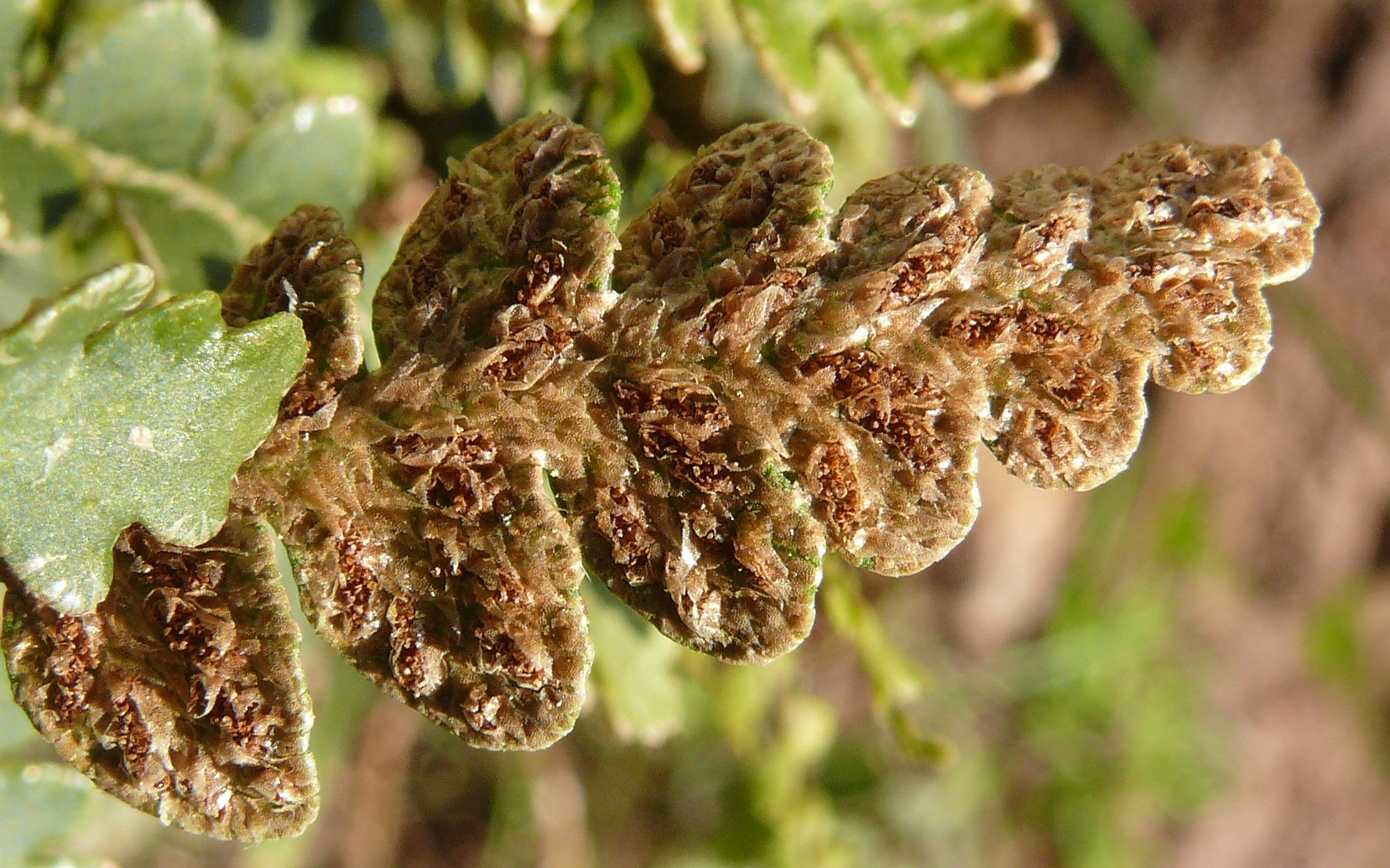
Close up of sori and scales

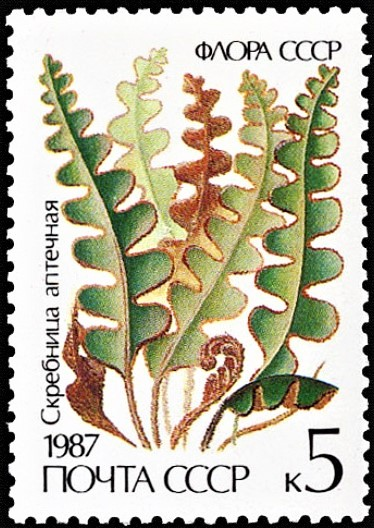
Attractive stamp from the USSR

Asplenium ceterach, also known as the rustyback fern, is a fern species in the spleenwort family Aspleniaceae.

== Description ==
Asplenium ceterach is a perennial and evergreen fern species characterized by its compact size and robust, intricately divided fronds, measuring up to 20 cm (7.9 in) in length. The undersides of these fronds are covered in a dense layer of pale reddish-brown scales, from which the common name originates. The leaves roll up in the summer, showing just the scaly undersides.

== Distribution ==
Asplenium ceterach has a large Western and Central European distribution, where it is located in the countries of: Albania, Austria, Belgium, Bulgaria, Crimea, Croatia, Cyprus, France, Germany, Great Britain, Greece, Hungary, Ireland, Italy, Kazakhstan, Malta, Netherlands, Portugal, Romania, Spain, Sweden, Switzerland. The species is also native to the European island territories of: Baleares, Corsica, Crete, Sardinia and Scilly. It can also be found within the North Caucasus region and European Turkey. A. ceterach is believed to be locally extinct in Poland.

Within Asia Asplenium ceterach can be found within the countries of: Afghanistan, China, Iran, Iraq, Lebanon, Syria, Pakistan, Israel, Tadzhikistan, Turkey, Uzbekistan. The species has a range extending throughout the Transcaucasus region which extends along the West Himalayas where the species can also be found in Tibet.

The African range of Asplenium ceterach includes several countries within North Africa. These countries include Algeria, Djibouti, Libya, Morocco and Tunisia. Just off the coast of Africa the species can also be found living on the Canary Islands.

== Habitat ==
Asplenium ceterach is associated with fissure habitat in carbonate rocks and also grows on the mortar of stone and brick walls. The species can be found growing up to 2,700 m (8,900 ft) above the sea level, although it prefers mountainous locations, where it is usually found growing on rocky walls and slopes in full sun.

Unlike many others, this fern likes growing in full sun, and requires little, if any, humidity.

== Subspecies ==
Asplenium ceterach exhibits polyploidy within the species with populations in different regions possessing various levels of diploid, tetraploid and hexapoloid forms. Many of these forms are treated as respective subspecies. The following subspecies are recognised:

Subspecies	Polyploidy	Range
A. ceterach ssp. ceterach	tetraploid	Occurring throughout the species range from Europe to Tibet. Also present in North Africa.
A. ceterach ssp. bivalens	diploid	Central and Eastern Europe: Croatia, Bulgaria, Hungary, Romania, Italy, Greece, Turkey.
A. ceterach ssp. cyprium		Native to Mediterranean Europe and North Africa: Cyprus, Greece, Italy, Sardinia, Sicilia, Spain, Tunisia.
A. ceterach subsp. mediterraneum		Native to Greece.

=== Hybrid nothospecies ===
The species also possesses naturally occurring hybrid nothospecies:

Nothospecies	Polyploidy	Range	Hybrid Formula
A. ceterach nothosubsp. mantoniae		Eastern Central and Southern Europe to South Turkey.	A. ceterach subsp. bivalens × A. ceterach subsp. ceterach
A. ceterach nothosubsp. troodeum		Native to Mediterranean Europe: Cyprus, Italy, Scilly.	A. ceterach subsp. ceterach × A. ceterach subsp. cyprium

== Taxonomy ==
Linnaeus was the first to describe rustyback with the binomial Asplenium ceterach in his Species Plantarum of 1753.

A global phylogeny of Asplenium published in 2020 divided the genus into eleven clades, which were given informal names pending further taxonomic study. A. scolopendrium belongs to the "Ceterach subclade" of the "Phyllitis clade". Members of the Phyllitis clade have undivided or pinnatifid leaf blades with a thick, leathery texture, persistent scales on their stalk, and often possess anastomosing veins. Members of the Ceterach subclade have pinnatifid leaves, usually with a thick covering of hairs and/or scales and irregularly anastomosing veins.

== Traditional uses ==
Asplenium ceterach has been traditionally used as a medicinal herb. The plant has been historically utilized to treat a large variety of health problems in humans. A. ceterach extract has been used as a mucoactive agent, diuretic and laxative. A. ceterach was also used to treat kidney stones, spleen issues, haemorrhoids and intestinal disorders. The plant has even been used to treat respiratory disorders and hypertension.

Extracts created from A. ceterach display anticancer properties. Extracts possess a selective inhibitory effect against cervical cancer cells and a low cytotoxicity towards healthy non-cancerous cells in humans.

== Desiccation tolerance ==
This fern is well known as a resurrection plant due to its ability to withstand desiccation and subsequently recover on rewetting. It has been shown that this is in part due to its high concentrations of phenolic compounds such as chlorogenic acid and caffeic acid which allow it to negate the destructive capacity of the reactive oxygen species generated by the drying process; the concentrations of these phenols decrease during the dehydration process. Enzymes such as peroxidase and polyphenol oxidase have also been shown to be important in allowing this fern to cope with desiccation; the concentrations of these enzymes increase when the fern is subjected to water shortages.
