= Bunești, Vâlcea =

Bunești
- Commune
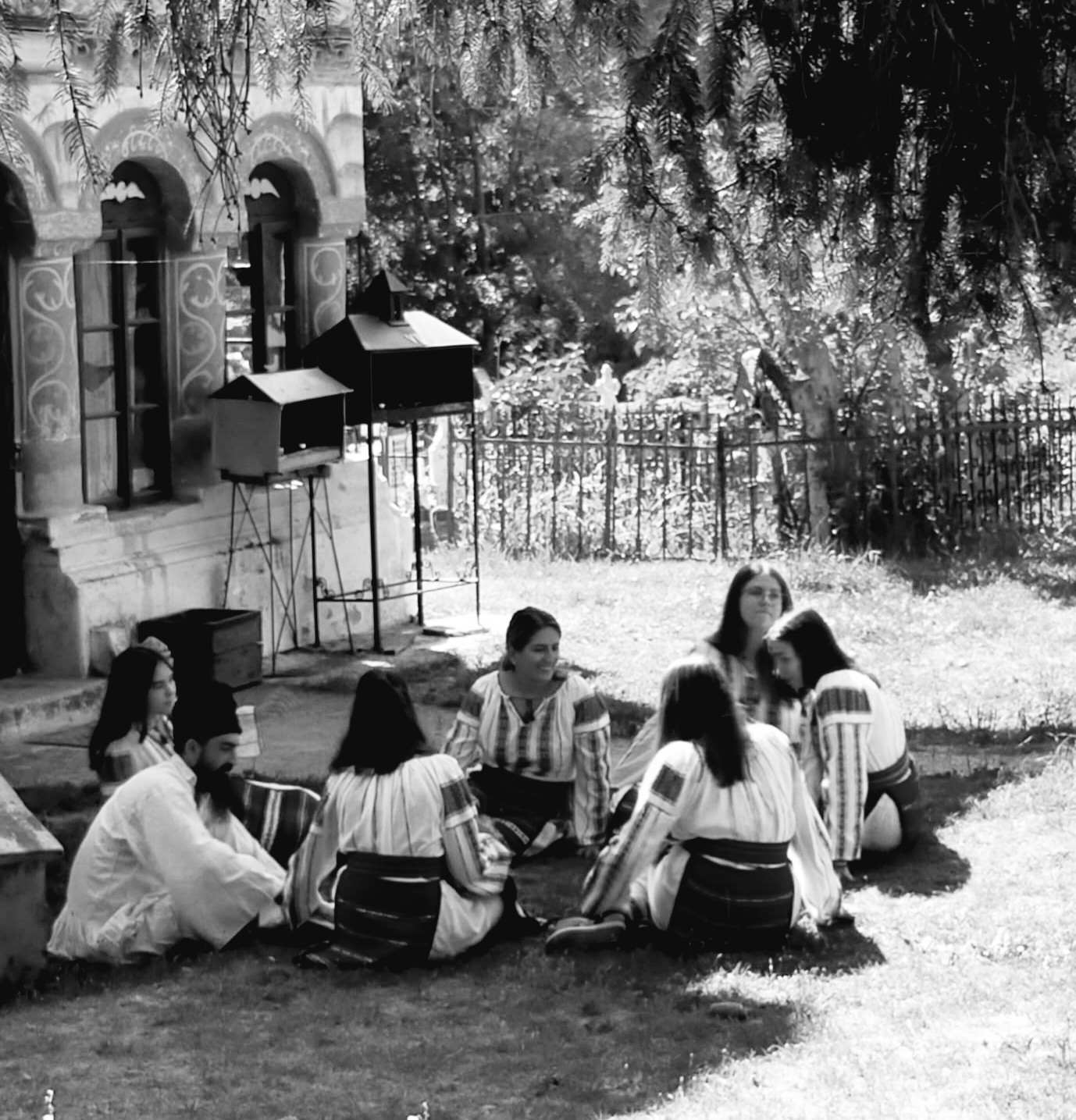
- St. Nicholas Church in Teiușu

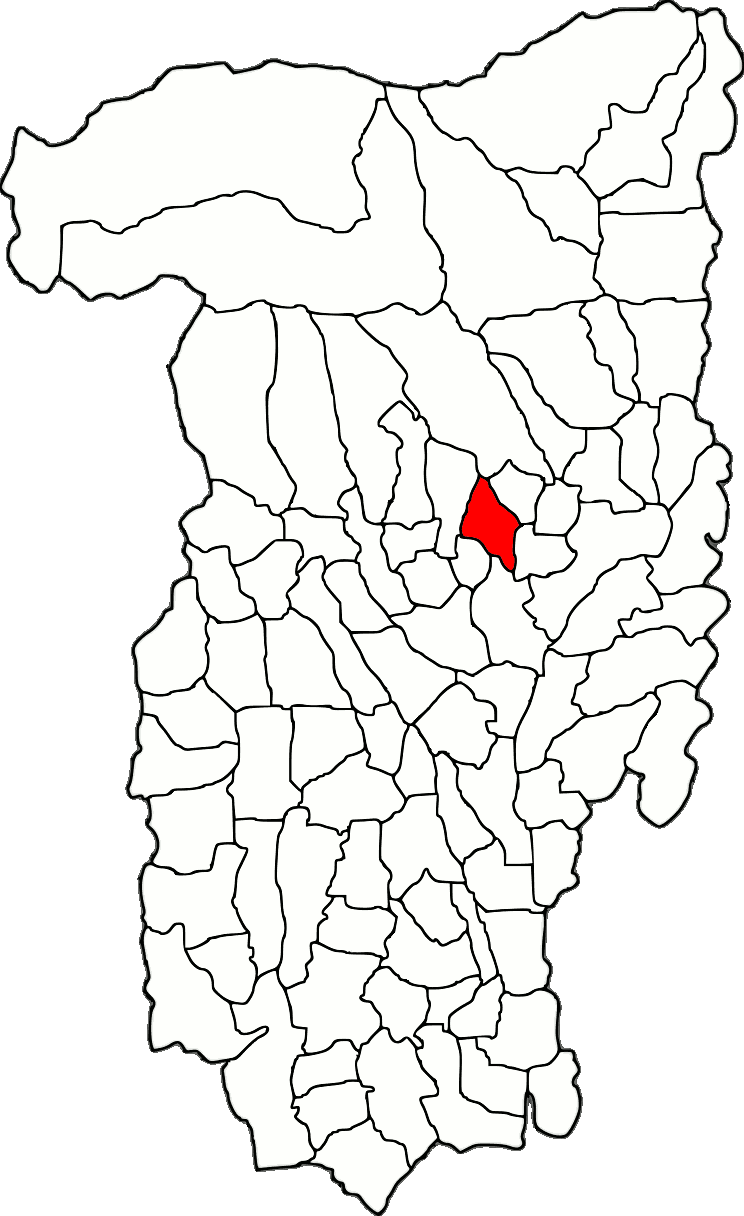
- Location in Vâlcea County

- Location in Romania
- Coordinates: 45.1512°N 24.1628°E
- Country: Romania
- County: Vâlcea

Government
  - Mayor (2024–2028): Viorel Radi (PSD)
- Elevation: 306 m (1,004 ft)
- Population (2021-12-01): 2,438
- Time zone: UTC+02:00 (EET)
  - Summer (DST): UTC+03:00 (EEST)
- Postal code: 247075
- Area code: +(40) 250
- Vehicle reg.: VL
- Website: www.primaria-bunesti.ro

Bunești is a commune located in Vâlcea County, Romania. It is composed of six villages: Bunești, Coasta Mare, Firești, Râpănești, Teiusu, and Titireci. It is situated in the historical region of Oltenia.

Historical population
Year	Pop.	±%
2002	2,664	—
2011	2,639	−0.9%
2021	2,438	−7.6%
Source: Census data
