= Morărești =

- Commune
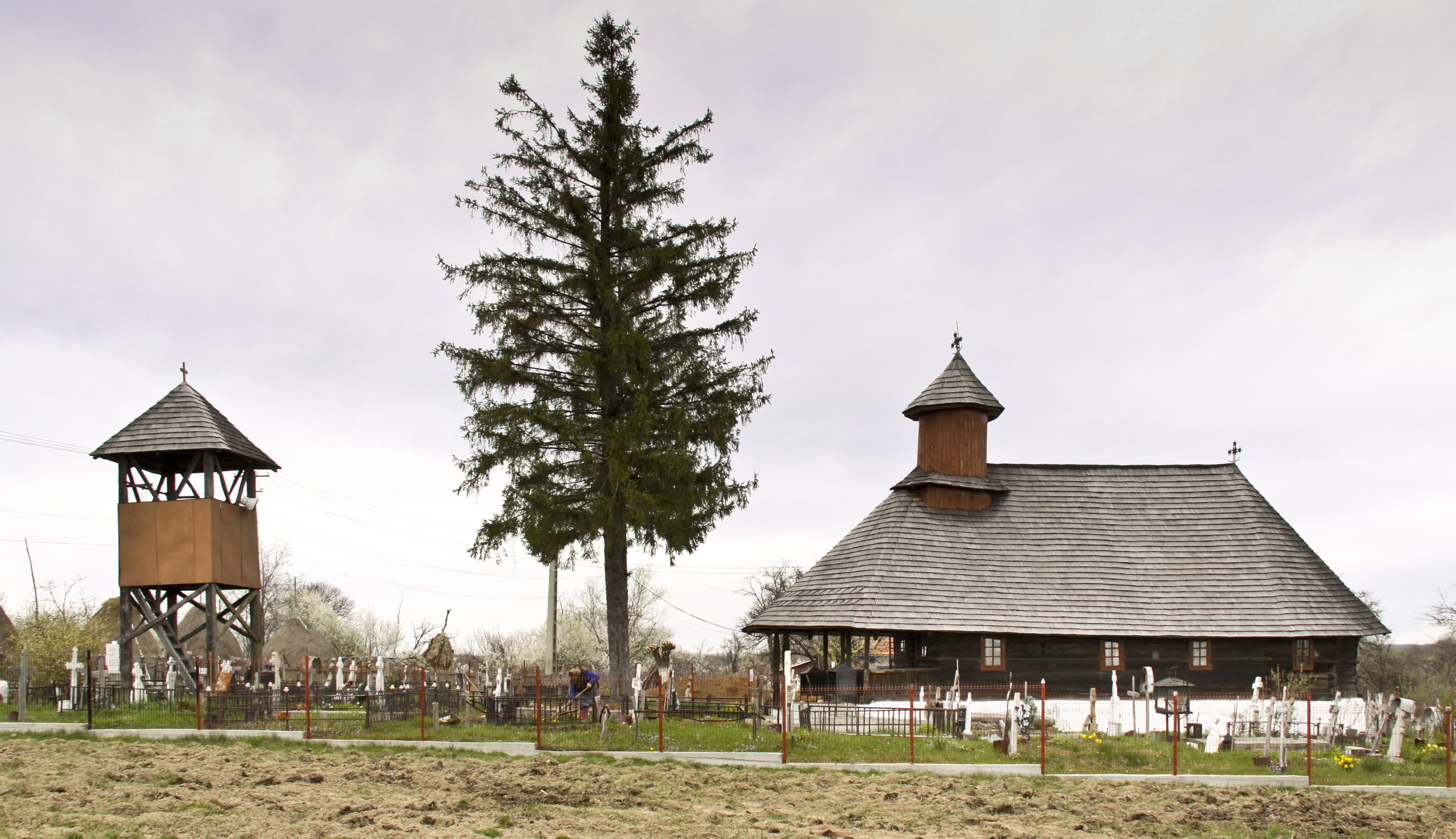

- Location in Romania
- Coordinates: 45.0203°N 24.5660°E
- Country: Romania
- County: Argeș
- Population (2021-12-01): 1,739
- Time zone: UTC+02:00 (EET)
  - Summer (DST): UTC+03:00 (EEST)
- Vehicle reg.: AG

Morărești is a commune in Argeș County, Muntenia, Romania. It is composed of six villages: Dedulești, Dealu Obejdeanului, Luminile, Măncioiu, Morărești and Săpunar.

== Climate ==
Morărești has a humid continental climate, characteristic of the hilly regions of southern Romania, with relatively cool winters, warm summers and precipitation distributed throughout the year. The local climate is influenced by the elevation of approximately 548 m and by the area's position on the Cotmeana Platform, between the drainage basins of the Argeș, Vedea and Olt rivers. The surrounding relief contributes to frequent variations in temperature and to the occurrence of fog, particularly during the colder part of the year.

Climatological observations at Morărești indicate an annual mean temperature of approximately 11 °C. July is the warmest month, with a mean temperature of 21.4 °C and an average daily maximum of 27.0 °C, while January is the coldest, with a mean temperature of 0.6 °C and an average daily minimum of −2.9 °C. The absolute maximum temperature recorded is 37.3 °C, measured on 4 July 2000, while the absolute minimum is −22.4 °C, recorded on 24 January 2006.

Precipitation occurs throughout the year, with an annual average of approximately 760 mm. The wettest month is generally June, when average precipitation reaches about 110 mm, followed by July, with approximately 97 mm. The driest month is February, with an average of about 33 mm. The highest recorded monthly precipitation was 293.1 mm in October 1972, while the highest annual precipitation total was 1,311.5 mm in 2014. The greatest amount of precipitation recorded in a 24-hour period was 93.5 mm, on 17 October 2013.

Snowfall occurs mainly from November to April, although snow cover is generally intermittent. January has an average of 6 snowy days, followed by February with 4 days and December with 3 days. On average, the area records about 19 snowy days per year. Snow is rare during the warm season and is absent on average from May through October.

Fog is a frequent local phenomenon and can persist for extended periods, particularly during autumn and winter, when temperature inversions and the surrounding hilly relief favor the accumulation of moist air. Wind is another prominent meteorological phenomenon, with its characteristics influenced by the exposed position of the area on the interfluve and by the surrounding valleys and hills.

The vegetation and land cover of the area are consistent with the regional climate, with mixed oak forests and thermophilous oak species occurring at the transition toward the warmer lowland areas of the Wallachian Plain.

Climate data for Dedulești-Morărești (elevation 548m, 2014–2026 normals, extremes 1980–present)
Month	Jan	Feb	Mar	Apr	May	Jun	Jul	Aug	Sep	Oct	Nov	Dec	Year
Record high °C (°F)	18.0 (64.4)	21.2 (70.2)	25.3 (77.5)	27.4 (81.3)	29.6 (85.3)	34.2 (93.6)	37.3 (99.1)	36.1 (97.0)	32.6 (90.7)	28.8 (83.8)	24.3 (75.7)	18.9 (66.0)	37.3 (99.1)
Mean daily maximum °C (°F)	4.2 (39.6)	6.5 (43.7)	10.7 (51.3)	15.7 (60.3)	19.7 (67.5)	25.0 (77.0)	27.0 (80.6)	27.7 (81.9)	22.9 (73.2)	15.9 (60.6)	9.7 (49.5)	5.9 (42.6)	15.9 (60.7)
Daily mean °C (°F)	0.6 (33.1)	2.5 (36.5)	6.2 (43.2)	10.5 (50.9)	14.5 (58.1)	19.6 (67.3)	21.4 (70.5)	21.9 (71.4)	17.4 (63.3)	11.1 (52.0)	6.1 (43.0)	2.7 (36.9)	11.2 (52.2)
Mean daily minimum °C (°F)	−2.9 (26.8)	−1.5 (29.3)	1.6 (34.9)	5.3 (41.5)	9.3 (48.7)	14.1 (57.4)	15.8 (60.4)	16.1 (61.0)	12.0 (53.6)	6.2 (43.2)	2.6 (36.7)	−0.6 (30.9)	6.5 (43.7)
Record low °C (°F)	−22.4 (−8.3)	−18.9 (−2.0)	−15.5 (4.1)	−5.4 (22.3)	−1.3 (29.7)	3.2 (37.8)	6.3 (43.3)	5.3 (41.5)	−1.4 (29.5)	−6.2 (20.8)	−11.3 (11.7)	−18.3 (−0.9)	−22.4 (−8.3)
Average precipitation mm (inches)	54.9 (2.16)	33.0 (1.30)	52.8 (2.08)	48.8 (1.92)	84.1 (3.31)	108.6 (4.28)	97.1 (3.82)	52.7 (2.07)	50.4 (1.98)	52.8 (2.08)	65.1 (2.56)	60.0 (2.36)	760.3 (29.92)
Average precipitation days (≥ 1.0 mm)	7.4	6.7	7.7	7.0	10.7	9.6	7.9	5.1	5.0	6.1	9.1	6.7	89
Average snowy days	5.6	4.4	3.2	0.5	0	0	0	0	0	0	2.1	3.3	19.1
Source 1: Meteomanz (2014-2026)
Source 2: Meteociel (1980-2002)
