= Băile Olănești =

- Town
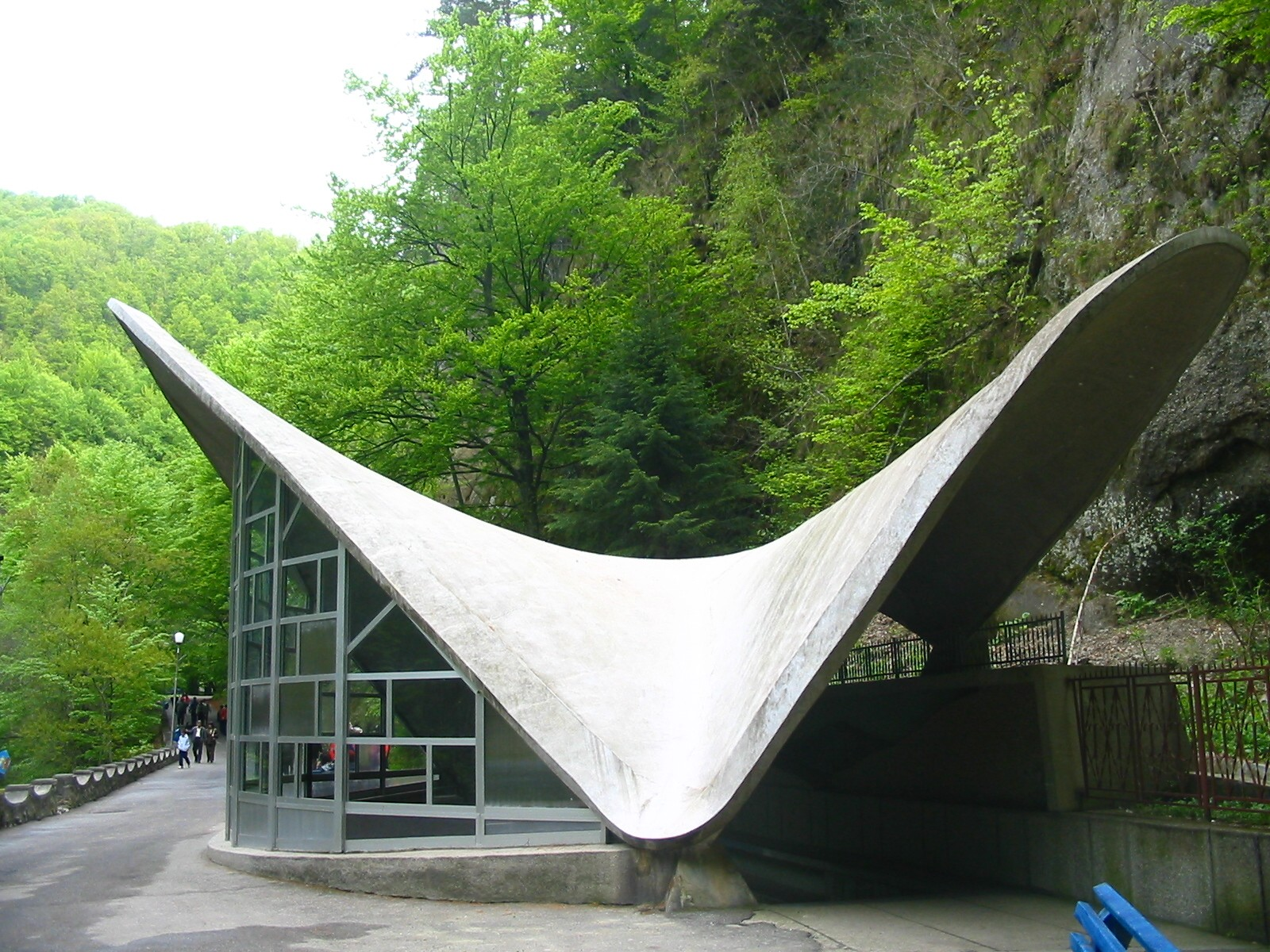

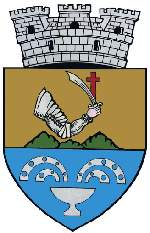
- Coat of arms

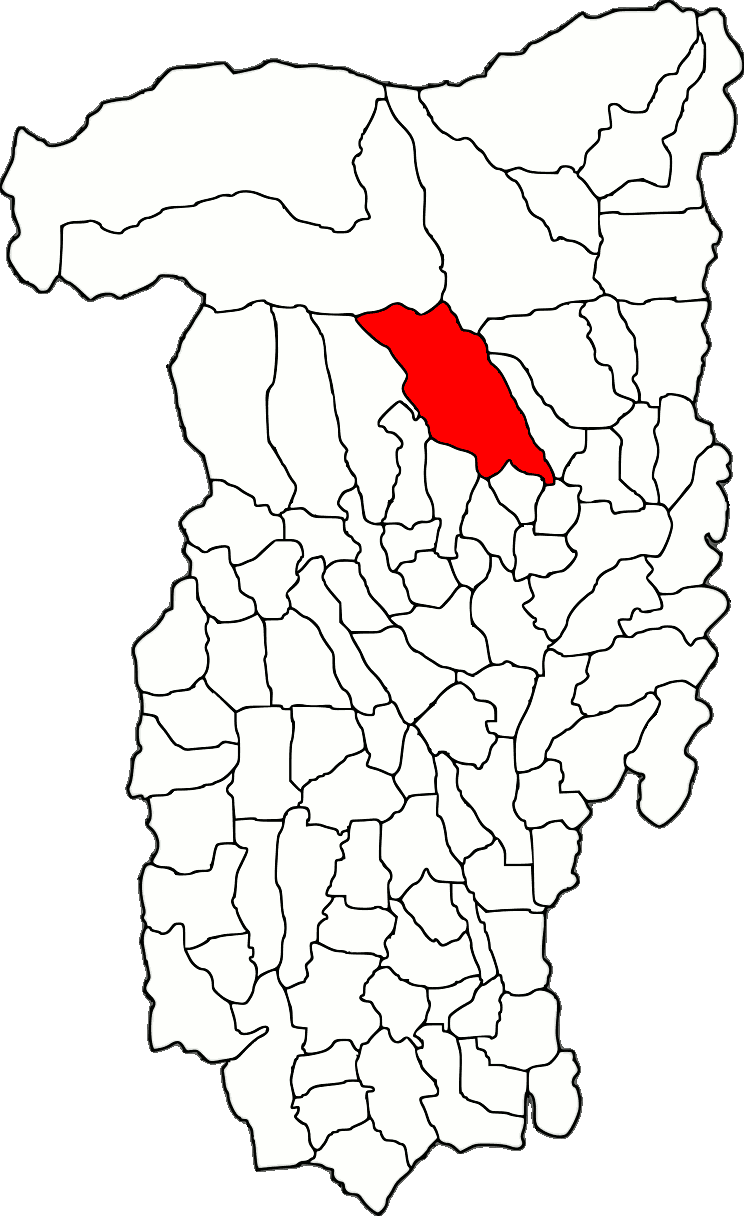
- Location in Vâlcea County

- Location in Romania
- Coordinates: 45°12′N 24°14′E
- Country: Romania
- County: Vâlcea

Government
  - Mayor (2024–2028): Vasile Sorin Vasilache (PSD)
- Area: 168.34 km^{2} (65.00 sq mi)
- Elevation: 440 m (1,440 ft)
- Population (2021-12-01): 3,750
  - Density: 22.3/km^{2} (57.7/sq mi)
- Time zone: UTC+02:00 (EET)
  - Summer (DST): UTC+03:00 (EEST)
- Postal code: 245300
- Area code: (+40) 02 50
- Vehicle reg.: VL
- Website: www.primariabaileolanesti.ro

Historical population
Year	Pop.	±%
1956	3,836	—
1966	4,619	+20.4%
1977	4,644	+0.5%
1992	4,777	+2.9%
2002	4,814	+0.8%
2011	4,064	−15.6%
2021	3,750	−7.7%
Source: Census data

Băile Olănești is a town located in Vâlcea County, Romania. The town administers eight villages: Cheia, Comanca, Gurguiata, Livadia, Mosoroasa, Olănești, Pietrișu, and Tisa. It is situated in the historical region of Oltenia.

The town is located in the central-northern part of the county, 20 km (12 mi) northwest of the county seat, Râmnicu Vâlcea. It lies on the banks of the Olănești River, in the hilly area south of the Parâng Mountains. Part of the Buila-Vânturarița National Park is situated on the territory of the town.

== History ==
The first documentary attestation of Olănești dates from 1527. The mineral waters of Olănești are mentioned for the first time in a 1760 charter and are called healing waters. In 1873 Olănești mineral waters are sent to the Vienna Exhibition, obtaining the Golden Medal.

== Notable people ==
- Constantin Pîrvulescu (1895–1992), communist politician, one of the founders of the Romanian Communist Party
- Iulian Șerban (1985–2021), paracanoeist
