= Cerna (Olteț) =

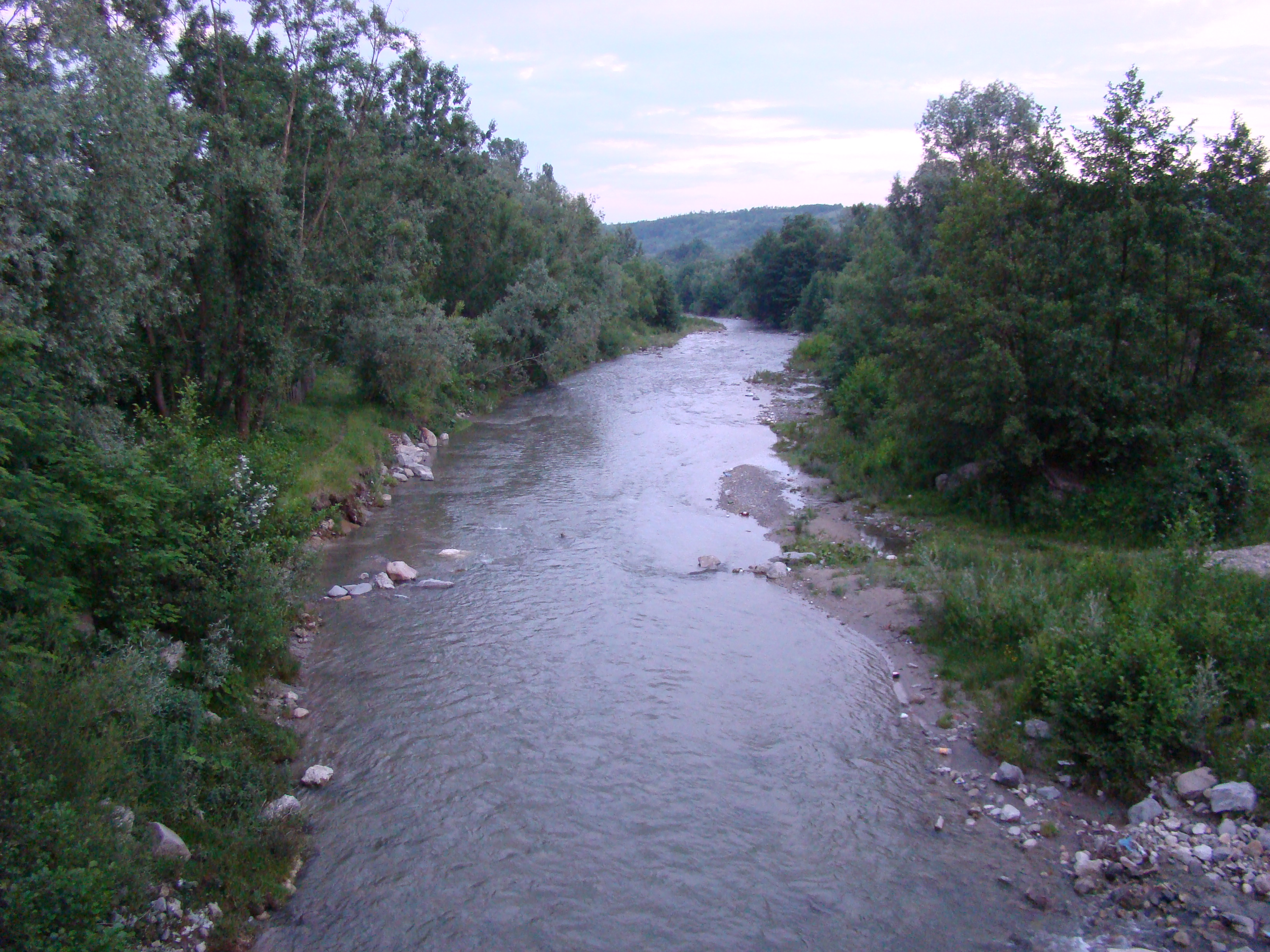

- Location within Romania

Location
- Country: Romania
- Counties: Vâlcea County

Physical characteristics
- Source: Căpățânii Mountains
- Mouth: Olteț
  - location: Budești
  - coordinates: 44.6124°N 23.9607°E
- Length: 164 km (102 mi)
- Basin size: 618 km^{2} (239 sq mi)

Basin features
- Progression: Olteț→ Olt→ Danube→ Black Sea
- Tributaries
  - left: Cernișoara
  - right: Glămana

The Cerna is a left tributary of the river Olteț in Romania. It discharges into the Olteț near Budești. It flows through the communes Vaideeni, Slătioara, Stroești, Copăceni, Lăpușata, Lădești, Stănești, Fârtățești, Măciuca, Valea Mare and Bălcești. Its length is 164 km (102 mi) and its basin size is 618 km^{2} (239 sq mi).

== Tributaries ==
The following rivers are tributaries to the river Cerna (from source to mouth):

- Left: Marița, Recea, Stroești, Cernișoara, Drăgan, Braniștea
- Right: Igiminea, Geamăna, Omorâcea
