= Cernișoara (river) =

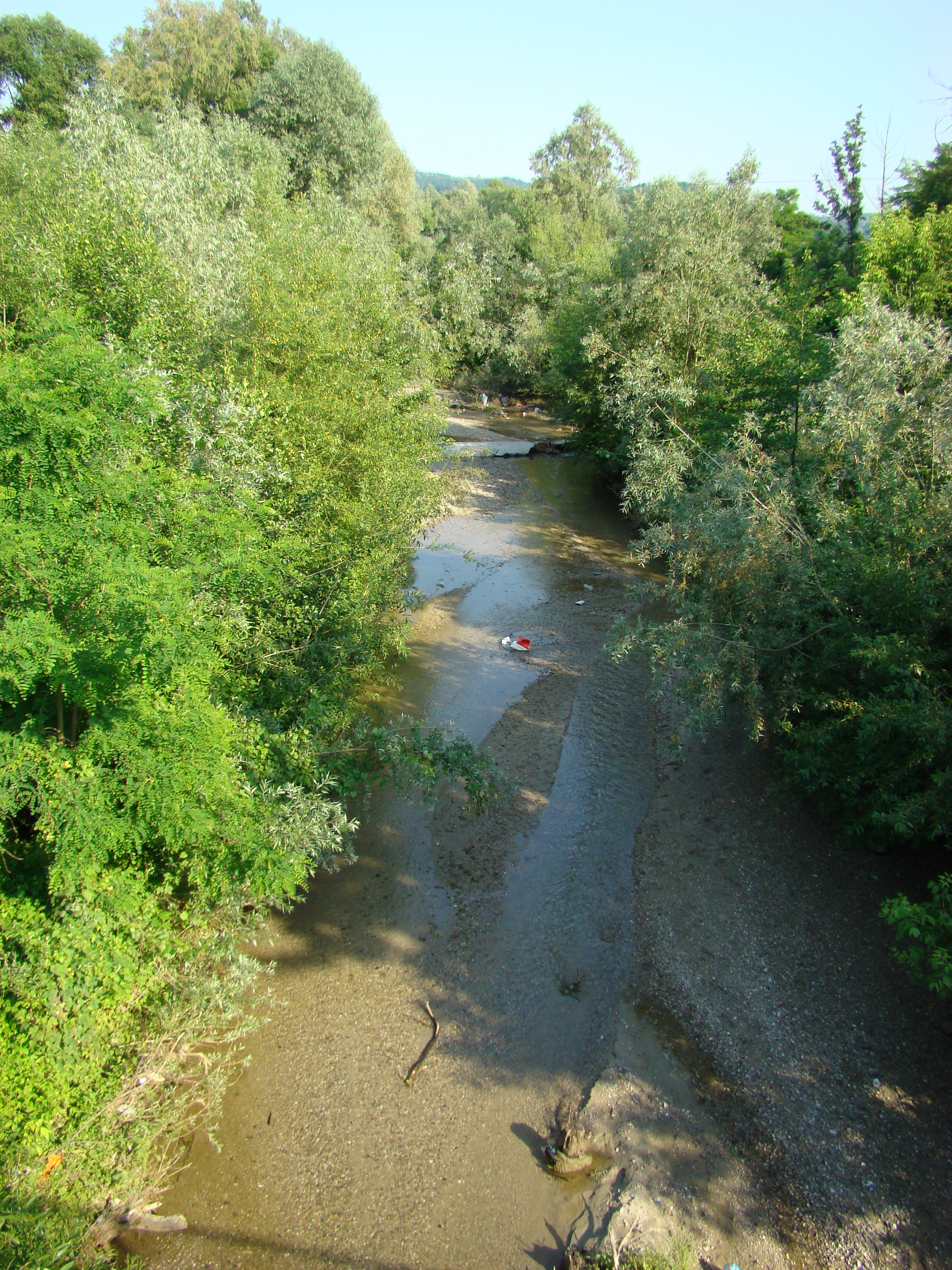

- Location within Romania

Location
- Country: Romania
- Counties: Vâlcea County

Physical characteristics
- Mouth: Cerna
  - coordinates: 44.8990°N 24.0492°E
- Length: 28 km (17 mi)
- Basin size: 89 km^{2} (34 sq mi)

Basin features
- Progression: Cerna→ Olteț→ Olt→ Danube→ Black Sea
- Tributaries
  - right: Cernișoara Orlii

The Cernișoara is a left tributary of the river Cerna in Romania. It discharges into the Cerna in Lădești. It flows through the villages Cernișoara, Armășești, Groși, Modoia, Saioci, Ciocâltei and Roești. Its length is 28 km (17 mi) and its basin size is 89 km^{2} (34 sq mi).
