= Popești =

Popești may refer to several places in Romania:

- Popești, Argeș, a commune in Argeș County
- Popești, Bihor, a commune in Bihor County
- Popești, Iași, a commune in Iași County
- Popești, Vâlcea, a commune in Vâlcea County
- Popești, Vrancea, a commune in Vrancea County
- Popești (river), a tributary of the Nadăș in Cluj County
- Popești, a village in Întregalde, Alba
- Popești, a village in Cocu, Argeș
- Popești, a village in Săpata, Argeș
- Popești, a village in Găiceana, Bacău
- Popești, a village in Vasilați, Călărași
- Popești, a village in Baciu, Cluj
- Popești, a village in Melinești, Dolj
- Popești, a village in Logrești, Gorj
- Popești, a village in Cârjiți, Hunedoara
- Popești, a village in Farcașa, Neamț
- Popești, a village in Girov, Neamț
- Popești, a village in Bărăști, Olt
- Popești, a village in Văleni, Olt
- Popești, a village in Brazi, Prahova
- Popești, a village in Podenii Noi, Prahova
- Popești, a village in Dragomirești, Vaslui
- Popești, a village in Miclești, Vaslui
- Popești, a village in Fârtățești, Vâlcea
- Popești, a village in Golești, Vâlcea
- Popești, a village in Lădești Vâlcea
- Popești, a village in Măciuca Vâlcea
- Popești, a village in Nicolae Bălcescu, Vâlcea
- Popești, a village in Sinești, Vâlcea
- Popești, a village in Stoenești, Vâlcea
- Popești, a village in Tetoiu, Vâlcea
- Popești, a district in the town of Mihăilești, Giurgiu
- Popești-Leordeni, a town in Ilfov County
