= Marița (river) =

- Location within Romania

Location
- Country: Romania
- Counties: Vâlcea County
- Villages: Marița

Physical characteristics
- Mouth: Cerna
  - coordinates: 45.1318°N 23.8875°E
- Length: 13 km (8.1 mi)
- Basin size: 20 km^{2} (7.7 sq mi)

Basin features
- Progression: Cerna→ Olteț→ Olt→ Danube→ Black Sea

The Marița is a left tributary of the river Cerna in Romania. It flows into the Cerna near Slătioara. Its length is 13 km (8.1 mi) and its basin size is 20 km^{2} (7.7 sq mi).
