= Recea (Cerna) =

Recea Valea Plopilor
- Location within Romania

Location
- Country: Romania
- Counties: Vâlcea County
- Villages: Izvoru Rece

Physical characteristics
- Mouth: Cerna
  - location: Slătioara
  - coordinates: 45.1262°N 23.8941°E
- Length: 18 km (11 mi)
- Basin size: 38 km^{2} (15 sq mi)

Basin features
- Progression: Cerna→ Olteț→ Olt→ Danube→ Black Sea

The Recea (also: Valea Plopilor) is a left tributary of the river Cerna in Romania. It flows into the Cerna in Slătioara. Its length is 18 km (11 mi) and its basin size is 38 km^{2} (15 sq mi).
