= Lăpușata =

- Commune
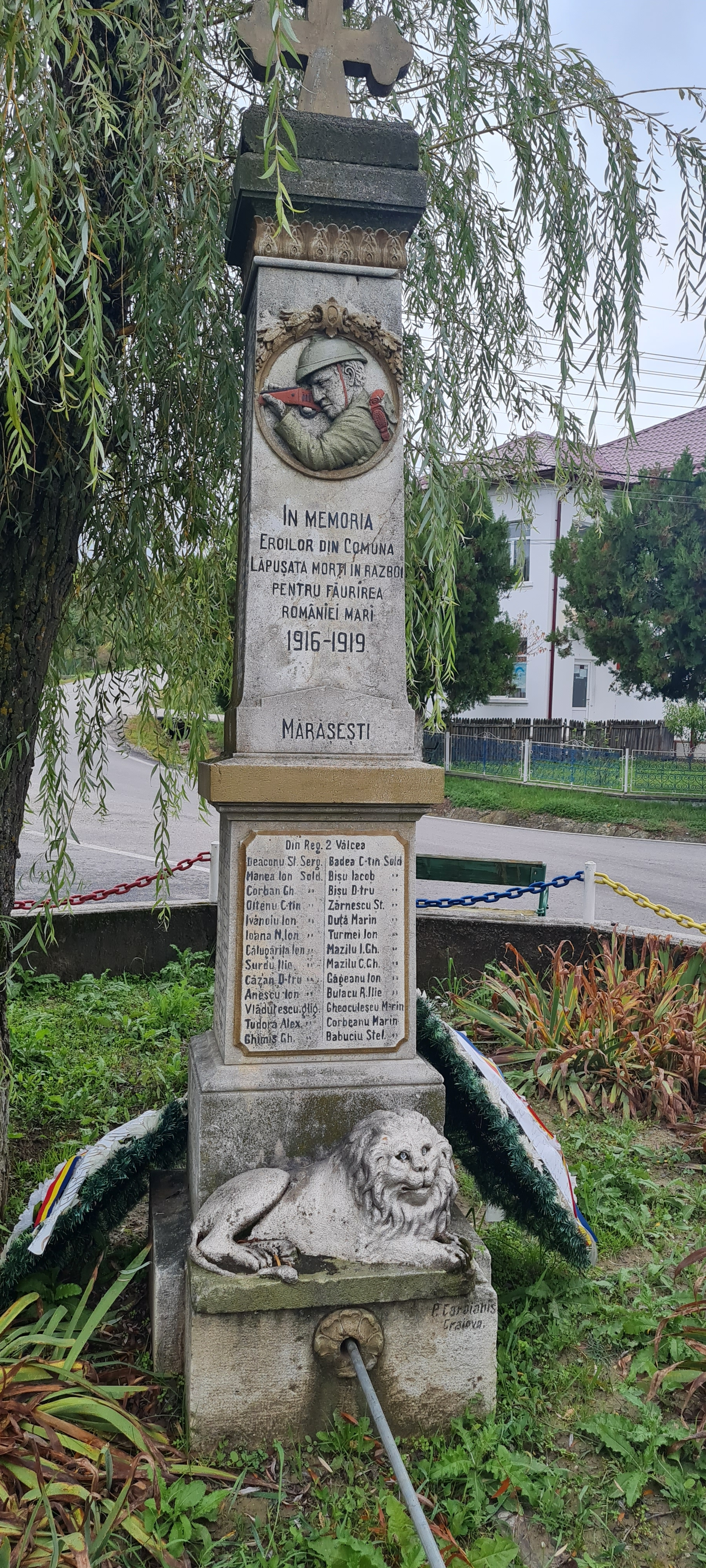
- World War I memorial in Zărnești

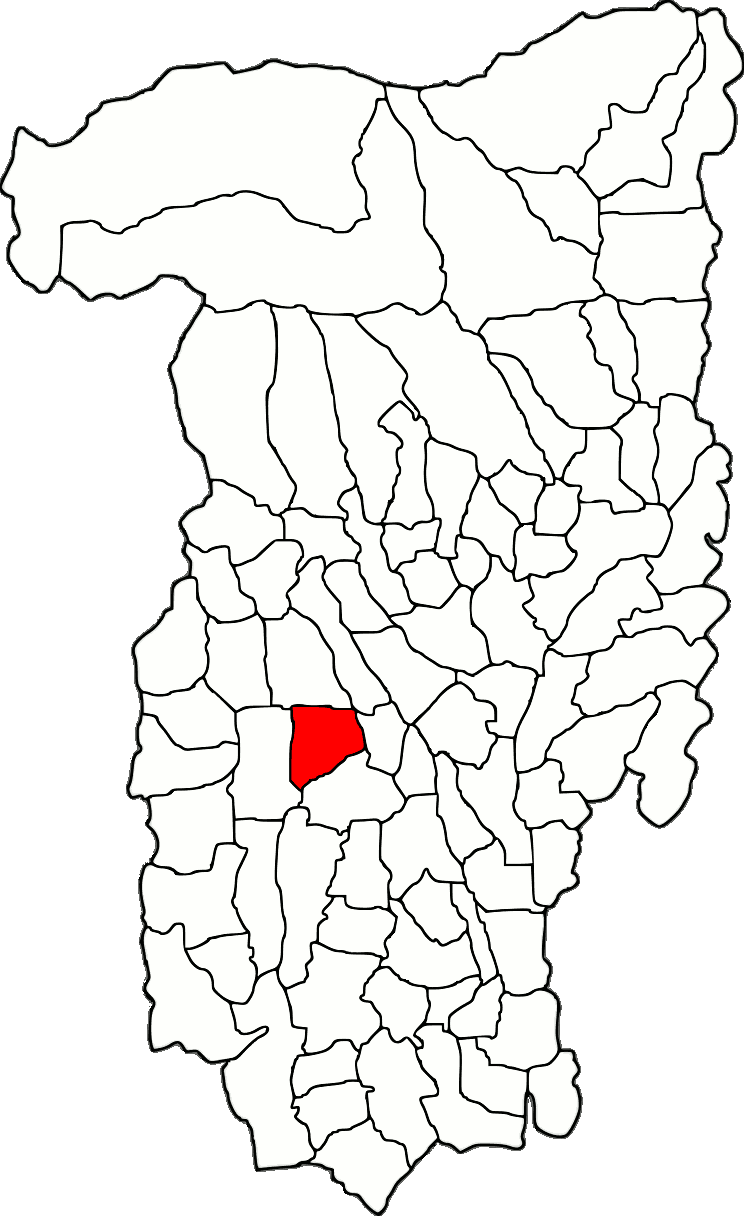
- Location in Vâlcea County

- Location in Romania
- Coordinates: 44°55′N 24°01′E
- Country: Romania
- County: Vâlcea

Government
  - Mayor (2020–2024): Nicolae Joița (PNL)
- Area: 37.12 km^{2} (14.33 sq mi)
- Elevation: 291 m (955 ft)
- Population (2021-12-01): 1,859
  - Density: 50.08/km^{2} (129.7/sq mi)
- Time zone: UTC+02:00 (EET)
  - Summer (DST): UTC+03:00 (EEST)
- Postal code: 247305
- Area code: +(40) 250
- Vehicle reg.: VL
- Website: www.primaria-lapusata.ro

Lăpușata is a commune located in Vâlcea County, Oltenia, Romania. It is composed of seven villages: Berești, Broșteni, Mijați, Sărulești (the commune centre), Scorușu, Șerbănești, and Zărnești.

The commune is situated in the Wallachian Plain, at an altitude of 291 m (955 ft), on the banks of the river Cerna. It is located in the central part of the county, about 50 km (31 mi) southwest of the county seat, Râmnicu Vâlcea. It borders the following communes: Copăceni to the north, Lădești to the south, Roșiile to the west, and Roești to the east.
