= Seciu =

Seciu may refer to several villages in Romania:

- Seciu, a village in the town of Boldești-Scăeni, Prahova County
- Seciu, a village in Fârtățești Commune, Vâlcea County
- Seciu, a village in Chiojdeni Commune, Vrancea County
