= Rugetu =

Rugetu may refer to several villages in Romania:

- Rugetu, a village in Mihăeşti Commune, Vâlcea County
- Rugetu, a village in Slătioara Commune, Vâlcea County
