= Călui (river) =

- Location within Romania

Location
- Country: Romania
- Counties: Olt County
- Villages: Gura Căluiu, Călui, Oboga

Physical characteristics
- Source
  - coordinates: 44°32′37″N 23°56′41″E
  - elevation: 246 m (807 ft)
- Mouth: Olteț
  - location: Near Oboga
  - coordinates: 44°24′14″N 24°06′26″E
  - elevation: 132 m (433 ft)
- Length: 24 km (15 mi)
- Basin size: 69 km^{2} (27 sq mi)

Basin features
- Progression: Olteț→ Olt→ Danube→ Black Sea
- Tributaries
  - right: Căluieț

The Călui is a right tributary of the river Olteț in Romania. It discharges into the Olteț near Oboga. Its length is 24 km (15 mi) and its basin size is 69 km^{2} (27 sq mi).
