= Berbești (disambiguation) =

Berbești may refer to several places:

- Berbești, a town in Vâlcea County, Romania
- Berbești, a village in Laloșu commune, Vâlcea County, Romania
- Berbești, a village in Giulești commune, Maramureș County, Romania
- Berbești, the former Romanian name of Brusnytsia, a village in Chernivtsi Oblast, Ukraine
