= Cermegești =

Cermegeşti may refer to several villages in Romania:

- Cermegeşti, a village in Lădești Commune, Vâlcea County
- Cermegeşti, a village in Pesceana Commune, Vâlcea County
