= Măciuca =

- Commune
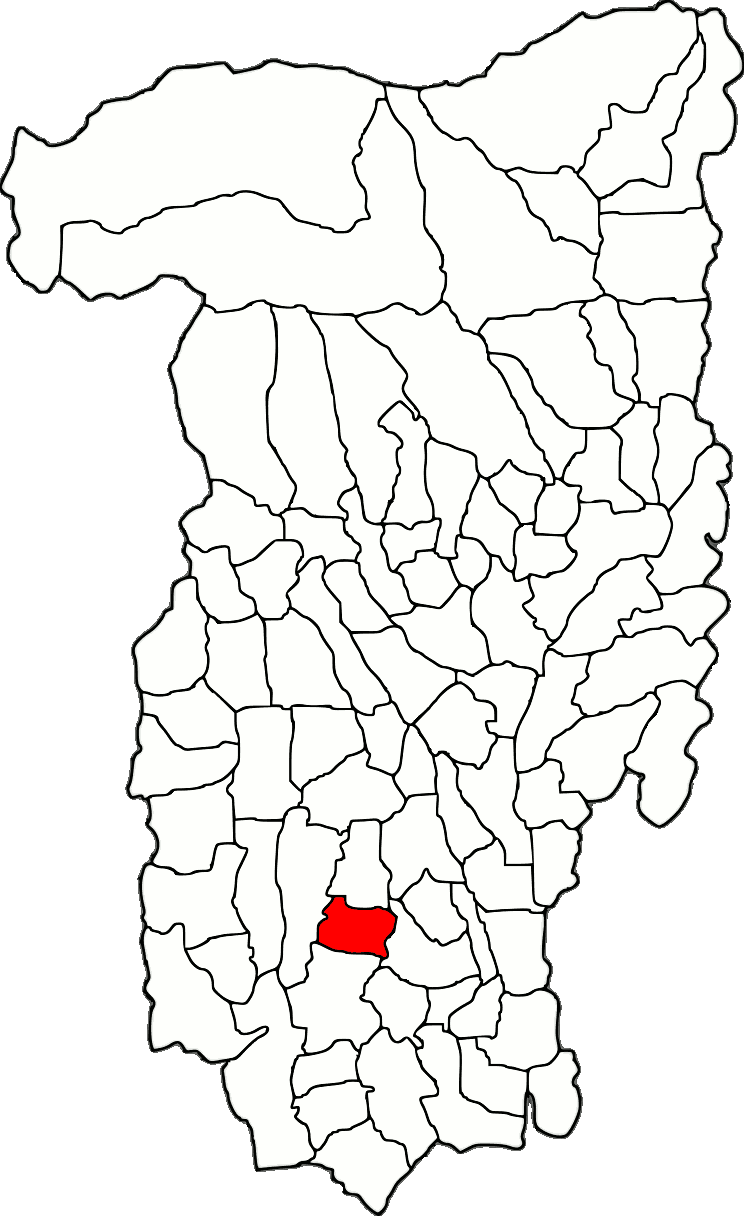
- Location in Vâlcea County

- Location in Romania
- Coordinates: 44°45′N 24°1′E
- Country: Romania
- County: Vâlcea

Government
  - Mayor (2024–2028): Mugurel Mărcoianu (PNL)
- Area: 44.46 km^{2} (17.17 sq mi)
- Elevation: 256 m (840 ft)
- Population (2021-12-01): 1,545
  - Density: 35/km^{2} (90/sq mi)
- Time zone: EET/EEST (UTC+2/+3)
- Postal code: 247345
- Area code: +(40) 250
- Vehicle reg.: VL
- Website: www.primaria-maciuca.ro

Măciuca is a commune located in Vâlcea County, Oltenia, Romania. It is composed of nine villages: Bocșa, Botorani, Ciocănari, Măciuceni, Măldărești, Oveselu (the commune centre), Popești, Ștefănești, and Zăvoieni.

The commune is situated in the southern part of the county, at a distance of 64 km (40 mi) from the county seat, Râmnicu Vâlcea. It lies on the left bank of the Cerna River, which flows through it for 7 km (4.3 mi). Măciuca borders four other communes: Stănești to the north, Gușoeni to the east, Valea Mare to the south, and Fârtățești to the west.

Historical population
Year	Pop.	±%
2002	2,209	—
2011	1,797	−18.7%
2021	1,545	−14.0%
Source: Census data

== Natives ==
- Dimitrie Drăghicescu (1875–1945), politician, sociologist, diplomat, and writer
