= Dan Adamescu =

Romanian businessman (1948–2017)

- Born: Dan Grigore Adamescu; 20 September 1948; Vaideeni, Vâlcea County, Romanian People's Republic
- Died: 24 January 2017 (aged 68); Bucharest, Romania
- Resting place: Bellu Cemetery, Bucharest
- Education: Bucharest Academy of Economic Studies
- Occupation: Businessman
- Spouse: Carmen Palade (divorced)
- Children: Alexander Adamescu

Dan Grigore Adamescu (20 September 1948 – 24 January 2017) was a Romanian businessman who was the founder of the Nova Group, and was the second richest Romanian in 2013. In 2016, he was sentenced to four years and four months in jail for bribing judges at his companies' insolvency trials.

== Career ==
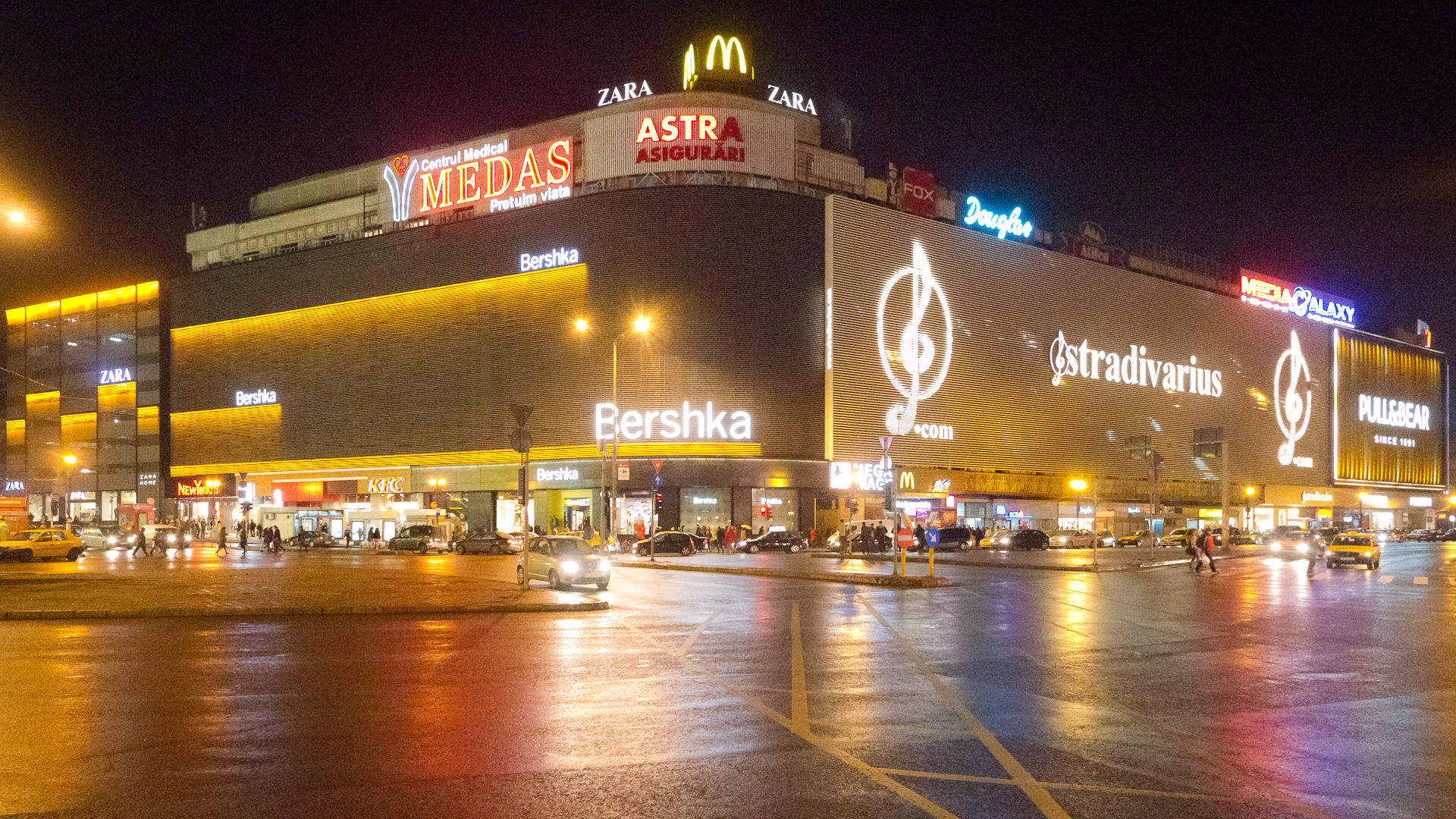
The Unirea Shopping Center, which was owned by Adamescu.

Born in Vaideeni, Vâlcea County, Adamescu entered business in 1971, after graduating from the Bucharest Academy of Economic Studies. Adamescu held Romanian and German citizenships. He spent eleven years working in Germany, and returned to Romania in 1989. He made his wealth in the early 1990s, when Romania was moving from communism to capitalism. Adamescu was critical of the Romanian Government's anti-corruption policies.

In 2013, Forbes estimated Adamescu's net worth at US$900 million, making him the second-richest Romanian, after Ioan Niculae. At the time, he was the majority shareholder of The Nova Group, which owned companies including România Liberă, Astra Insurance, ASC Oțelul Galați, and the Unirea Shopping Center. In 2015, Forbes Romania estimated his net worth to be €550 million. In October 2016, Alexander Adamescu, Dan's son, denied that his father had affiliations with Black Cube. HotNews.ro had claimed Adamescu was a client of Black Cube.

== Arrest and trial ==
In 2013, Adamescu's company Astra Insurance went bankrupt; his family blamed the Romanian state for causing the bankruptcy. During the bankruptcy trial, Adamescu was alleged to have bribed judges €20,000. In May 2014, Victor Ponta predicted that Adamescu would be arrested for corruption. Adamescu was arrested a few weeks afterwards. In the same year, one of the judges was arrested, after which Adamescu's lawyer allegedly committed suicide by throwing himself under a train. In March 2016, Adamescu was charged with causing $191 million of damages to Astra Insurance. In May 2016, he was sentenced to four years and four months in jail for corruption.

== Illness and death ==
In November 2016, Adamescu's parole request, based on ill health, was rejected by a local court. In December, he had knee surgery, after which he developed infections. He was in an induced coma from December 2016 until his death on 24 January 2017, and had been suffering from sepsis. Adamescu was buried in the Lutheran section of Bellu Cemetery.

== Family ==
Adamescu was married to Carmen Palade, general manager of Unirea Shopping Center for "many years". In October 2016, Palade, Ademescu's ex-wife, attempted to sue him for ownership of the Unirea Shopping Center. As of October 2018, Palade is being held by Romanian authorities after "several hours of hearings" on suspicion of embezzlement and tax evasion. Palade had fought for control of the Nova Group with her husband and stepson, Alexander Adamescu, and was removed as head of Nova in 2017, with Alexander taking over after his father's death.

Alexander Adamescu, a director of his father's company, was accused by Romania's National Anticorruption Directorate (DNA) of consenting to bribery. In May 2016 Romanian courts issued two national arrest warrants against Adamescu and then converted into a European Arrest Warrant in connection with his father's case. On 13 June 2016, he was arrested by British police. In an interview with The Times, he said he "fears that he will die in prison like his father if the Romanian government secures his extradition.

On 29 March 2017 during a hearing involving Adamescu's Dutch holding company Nova Group Investments and Romania, the International Centre for the Settlement of Investment Disputes tribunal recommended that Romania withdraw (or otherwise suspend operation of) the European Arrest Warrant against Adamescu, and called upon Romania to "refrain from reissuing or transmitting any other EAW against him". On 10 April 2017, Romania asked the ICSID to reconsider its recommendation but this was rejected and the recommendation upheld.
