= Rösti (disambiguation) =

Rösti refers to a Swiss fried potato cake.

Rösti may also refer to the following:

- Adolf Rösti, Swiss alpine skier
- Albert Rösti (born 1967), Swiss politician

== See also ==
- Roeşti, Romanian commune
- Rosti
- Roti
