= Dinu Săraru =

Romanian novelist (1932–2024)

- Born: Constantin Grigore Săraru; 30 January 1932; Slătioara, Vâlcea County, Romania
- Died: 2 March 2024 (aged 92); Bucharest, Romania
- Burial place: Slătioara
- Occupation(s): Novelist, playwright

Dinu Săraru (30 January 1932 – 2 March 2024) was a Romanian novelist and playwright.

== Biography ==
Dinu Săraru was born in Slătioara, Vâlcea County. A member of Writers' Union of Romania, he belonged to the Central Committee of the Romanian Communist Party prior to 1989, and headed Teatrul Mic and Teatrul Foarte Mic from 1977 to 1990. After the Romanian Revolution of 1989 and the fall of the communist regime, he served as chairman of the National Theatre Bucharest, being appointed in 2001 and resigning in 2004. He claimed that his work during the communist regime had not been for the purpose of glorifying dictator Nicolae Ceaușescu, but rather included subtle dissident themes.

Săraru died on 2 March 2024, at the age of 92.
