= Dealu Bisericii =

Dealu Bisericii may refer to several villages in Romania:

- Dealu Bisericii, a village in Uda, Argeș
- Dealu Bisericii, a village in Sinești, Vâlcea
