= Boroșești =

Boroșești may refer to several places in Romania:

- Boroșești, a village in Scânteia Commune, Iași County
- Boroșești, a village in Sutești Commune, Vâlcea County
