= Dimitrie Drăghicescu =

Romanian politician and academic

Dimitrie Drăghicescu (or Dumitru Drăghicescu) (4 May 1875 – 14 September 1945) was a Romanian politician, sociologist, diplomat, and writer.

Dimitrie Drăghicescu was born on 4 May 1875 in the village of Zăvoieni, Vâlcea County, Romania. After finishing grammar school in his native village, he attended Carol I High School in Craiova and thereafter the Law Faculty of the University of Bucharest. In 1901, he left for Paris where he studied at the Collège de France with Emile Durkheim, Gabriel de Tarde, Henri Bergson, and Theodule Armand Ribot. He also attended the lectures organized by the Académie des Sciences Morales et Politiques.

In 1903, he published Le problème du déterminisme social: Déterminisme biologique et déterminisme social, which argued for biological determinism. On 17 May 1904, he obtained his doctor's degree in Sociology. In 1905, he was appointed associate professor of Sociology at the University of Bucharest.

During World War I, from 1916 to 1918 he lived in France where he was active in promoting the ideas of a national Romanian state. On 9–12 April 1918 he attended the "Congress of Nationalities" in Rome with Nicolae Lupu and Simion Mândrescu, as members of the group supporting the right of Romanians to a state within their national ethnic borders and demanding the recognition of Romania as a cobelligerent country.

From 1934 to 1936, he was minister plenipotentiary in Mexico.

He is said to have committed suicide on 14 September 1945.

== Works ==
- Din psihologia poporului român, Bucharest, 1907 (republished in Editura Albatros, 1996 ISBN 973-24-0351-9)

== Sources ==
- Istoria Transilvaniei, Vol.2, Editura Gh. Barițiu, Cluj, 1997
- Sociologia – ca disciplină de studiu, instituție și profesie
- Potra, George G., Reacții necunoscute la demiterea lui Titulescu 29 August 1936: O "mazilire perfidă", Magazin Istoric, 1998, Nr. 6
