= Făurești (disambiguation) =

Făureşti may refer to several places:

In Romania:

- Făurești, a commune in Vâlcea County
- Făureşti, a village in Copalnic-Mănăștur Commune, Maramureș County
- Făureşti, a village in Zătreni Commune, Vâlcea County

In Moldova:

- Făureşti, a village in Ciorescu Commune, Chişinău municipality
