= Olteț =

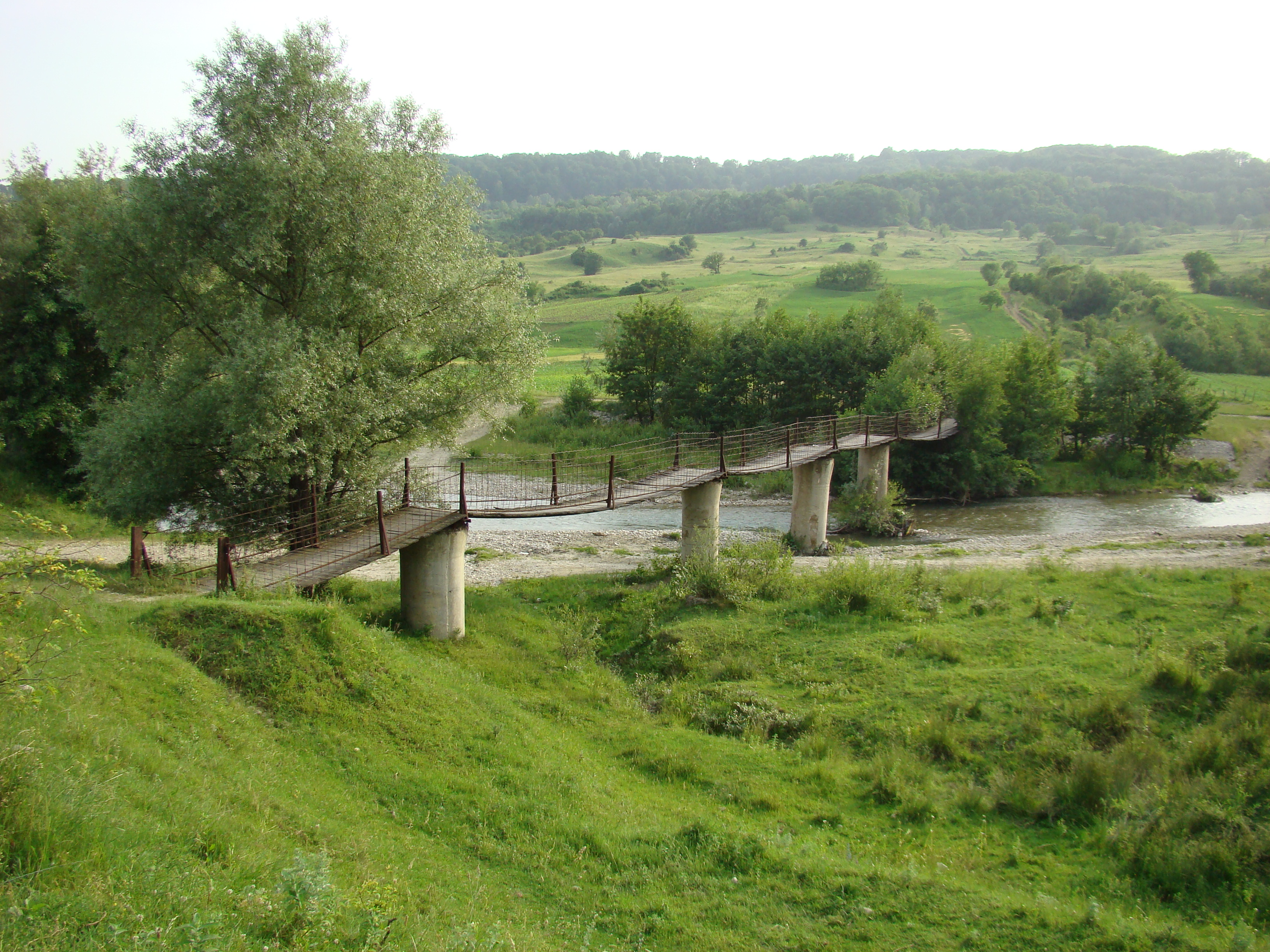

- Location within Romania

Location
- Country: Romania
- Counties: Gorj, Vâlcea, Olt
- Towns: Balș

Physical characteristics
- Mouth: Olt
  - location: Fălcoiu
  - coordinates: 44°13′29″N 24°25′40″E
- Length: 185 km (115 mi)
- Basin size: 2,663 km^{2} (1,028 sq mi)

Basin features
- Progression: Olt→ Danube→ Black Sea
- Tributaries
  - left: Cerna
  - right: Geamărtălui

The Olteț is a right tributary of the river Olt in Romania. It discharges into the Olt in Fălcoiu. Its total length is 185 km (115 mi), and its drainage basin area is 2,663 km^{2} (1,028 sq mi).

== Towns and villages ==
The following towns and villages are situated along the river Olteț, from source to mouth: Polovragi, Alimpești, Alunu, Sinești, Livezi, Zătreni, Bălcești, Laloșu, Morunglav, Balș, Bârza, Pârșcoveni, Osica de Sus, Fălcoiu, Diculești, Băbeni-Oltețu.

== Tributaries ==
The following rivers are tributaries to the river Olteț (from source to mouth):

- Left: Urlieșu, Dracu, Cujba, Lespezi, Savu, Pârâul Rău, Tărâia, Tulburea, Budele, Șasa, Cerna, Laloș, Bârlui, Balta Dascălului
- Right: Ungurel, Cornățel, Valea Iezerului, Obislav, Peșteana, Aninoasa, Călui, Valea Românei, Geamărtălui, Voineasa Mare, Pârâul Roșu, Bobu

== Archeological sites ==
Grăunceanu site in the Olteț River Valley is currently the oldest place where presence of hominins have been discovered in Europe. Fossils found here are estimated to be around 1.95 million years old.
