= Mitrofani =

- Commune
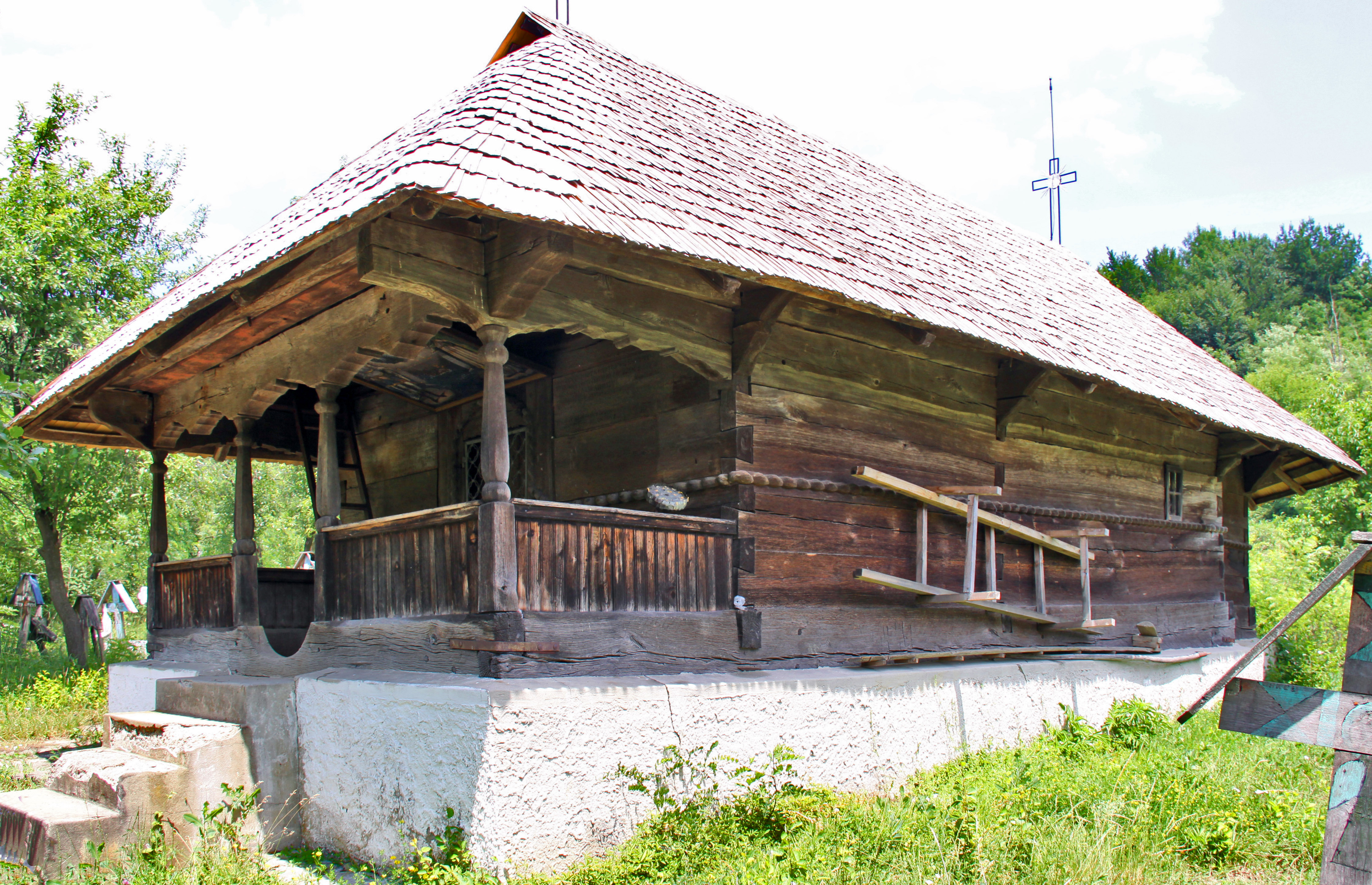
- Wooden church in Cetățeaua

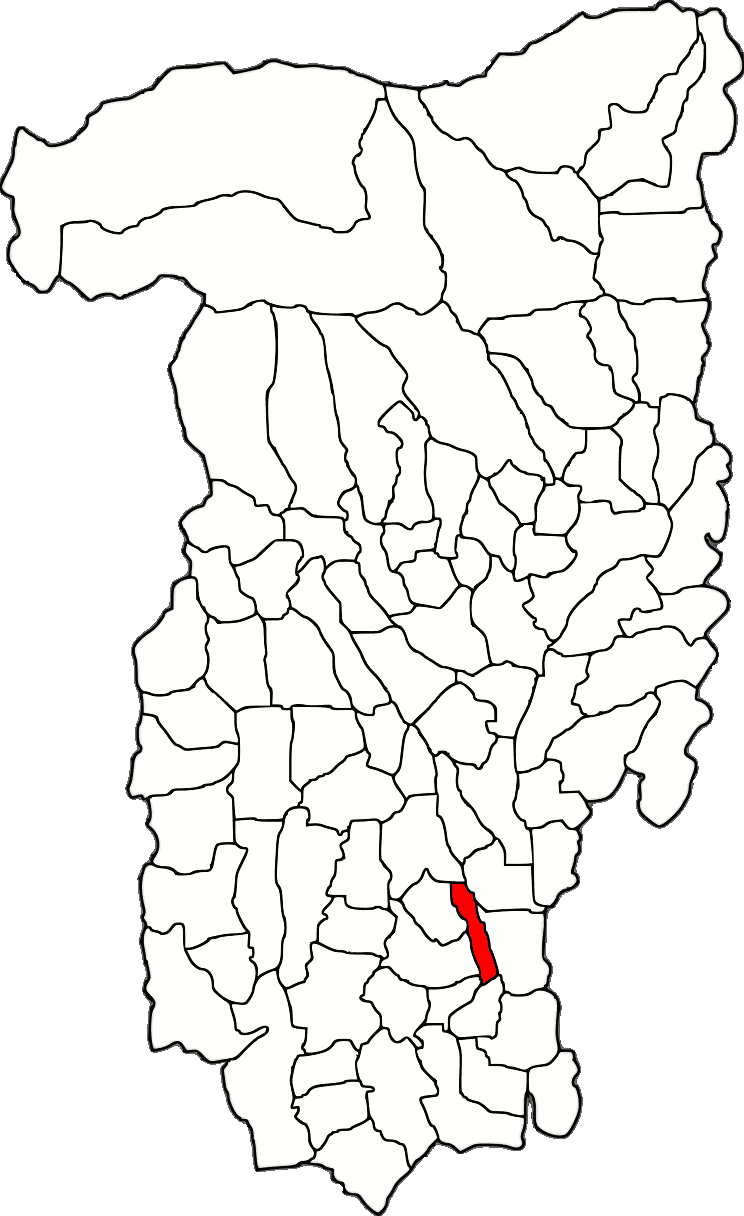
- Location in Vâlcea County

- Location in Romania
- Coordinates: 44°44′N 24°13′E
- Country: Romania
- County: Vâlcea

Government
  - Mayor (2024–2028): Gheorghe Coadă (PSD)
- Elevation: 230 m (750 ft)
- Population (2021-12-01): 800
- Time zone: UTC+02:00 (EET)
  - Summer (DST): UTC+03:00 (EEST)
- Postal code: 247676
- Area code: +(40) 250
- Vehicle reg.: VL
- Website: primariamitrofani.ro

Mitrofani is a commune located in Vâlcea County, Oltenia, Romania. It is composed of four villages: Mitrofani, Cetățeaua, Izvorașu, and Racu. These were part of Sutești Commune until 2004, when they were split off to form a separate commune.
