= Rosti =

Rosti is a surname. Notable people with the surname include:

- Stephan Rosti (1891–1964), Egyptian actor and film director
- Vicky Rosti (born 1958), Finnish singer of popular music
- Shawn Rosti (born 1973), Senior Engineering Manager

== See also ==
- Rösti (disambiguation)
- Rostipollos, restaurant franchise
- Roti
