= România Liberă =

Daily newspaper in Romania

- Type: Daily newspaper
- Format: Broadsheet
- Owner: Medien Holding
- Founded: 15 May 1877; 28 January 1943
- Political alignment: Conservative (1877-1889); Left (1943-1947); Far left (1947-1989); Conservative (1990-)
- City: Bucharest
- Country: Romania
- Website: romanialibera.ro

România liberă (Romanian pronunciation: [ro.mɨˈni.a ˈli.be.rə], lit. 'Free Romania') is a Romanian daily newspaper founded in 1943 and currently based in Bucharest. A newspaper of the same name also existed between 1877 and 1889.

== History and profile ==
1879 issue of the daily România liberă

The name România liberă was first used by a daily newspaper focusing on politics published between 15 May 1877, (one day after Romania declared its independence from the Ottoman Empire) and 13 April 1888, and afterwards by daily with somewhat erratic publication between 1915 and 1920.

The current series of România liberă began on 28 January 1943, during World War II, as an illegal newspaper of the Union of Patriots, a front organisation of the Communist Party. During the war it opposed the Nazi-allied government of Ion Antonescu, issuing calls to sabotage of the war industry and open armed resistance. Although after 1947 all the newspapers were controlled by the Communist Party, it has been described as the least ideological daily during the era of Nicolae Ceaușescu. It was also the only Romanian newspaper allowed to publish full-page advertisement sections.

In 1988, four journalists from România liberă, Petre Mihai Băcanu, Anton Uncu, Mihai Creanga, and Alexandru Chivoiu, attempted to publish a clandestine newspaper called Romania in which they criticized the Romanian leader Nicolae Ceaușescu and the censorship of the press, demanding press freedom and democracy. The four journalists were arrested by the Securitate, the secret police of the Communist regime, and were thrown in prison. They were freed on 22 December by the revolutionaries who had overthrown Ceausescu. They returned to România liberă and transformed the newspaper into a voice of the opposition to communism.

Although Ceaușescu was killed in December 1989, the power in Romania was taken mostly by former members of the Communist Party, notably Ion Iliescu. România liberă newspaper became the most critical voice against Iliescu and his government. The newspaper promoted conservative values, democracy, and the argued that Romania should join NATO and the European Union. They also wrote extensively about the abuses of the Securitate during the Communist Party's rule.

In 1990, România liberă's circulation rose as high as 1.5 million. However, those numbers fell off ten years later, and in 2000 the paper was purchased by the German company WAZ. Echoing complaints of journalists at rival daily Evenimentul Zilei, which was owned by the Swiss press trust Ringier, România liberă journalists complained in September 2004 that foreign owners were telling them to lessen political coverage and tone down their negative reporting of the government. Their concern was echoed by a variety of organizations including the Open Society Foundations. Paper's management denied the charges.

In the case of România liberă, this protest took the form of a statement in the edition of 13 September 2004, in which the newspaper's editors protested interference by WAZ. They accused their German ownership of having no concern for the public interest, and accused Klaus Overbeck in particular of trying to dictate to them what they could print in the newspaper. At the time of purchase WAZ had promised to confine themselves to the business side of the newspaper and stay out of editorial matters.

The paper has published The New York Times International Weekly on Fridays for some time beginning with 2009. This eight-page supplement featured a selection of English-language articles from The New York Times.

In 2010 WAZ left the Romanian market and its shares at România liberă, leaving businessman Dan Adamescu as single share holder of Medien Holding Group.
