= Sutești =

- Commune
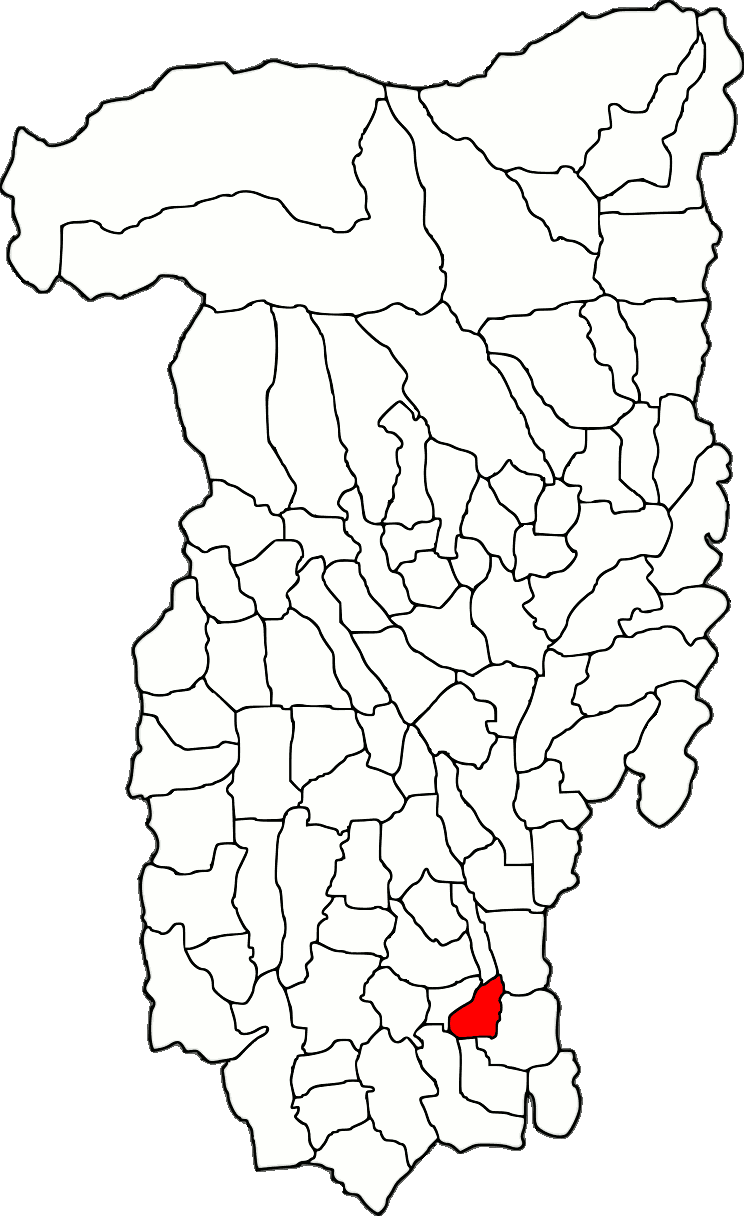
- Location in Vâlcea County

- Location in Romania
- Coordinates: 44.6746°N 24.1992°E
- Country: Romania
- County: Vâlcea
- Area: 24.91 km^{2} (9.62 sq mi)
- Population (2021-12-01): 1,683
  - Density: 67.56/km^{2} (175.0/sq mi)
- Time zone: UTC+02:00 (EET)
  - Summer (DST): UTC+03:00 (EEST)
- Vehicle reg.: VL

Sutești is a commune located in Vâlcea County, Oltenia, Romania. It is composed of four villages: Sutești, Boroșești, Mazili and Verdea. The commune also included Mitrofani, Cetățeaua, Izvorașu and Racu villages until 2004, when they were split off to form Mitrofani Commune.
