= Cernișoara =

- Commune
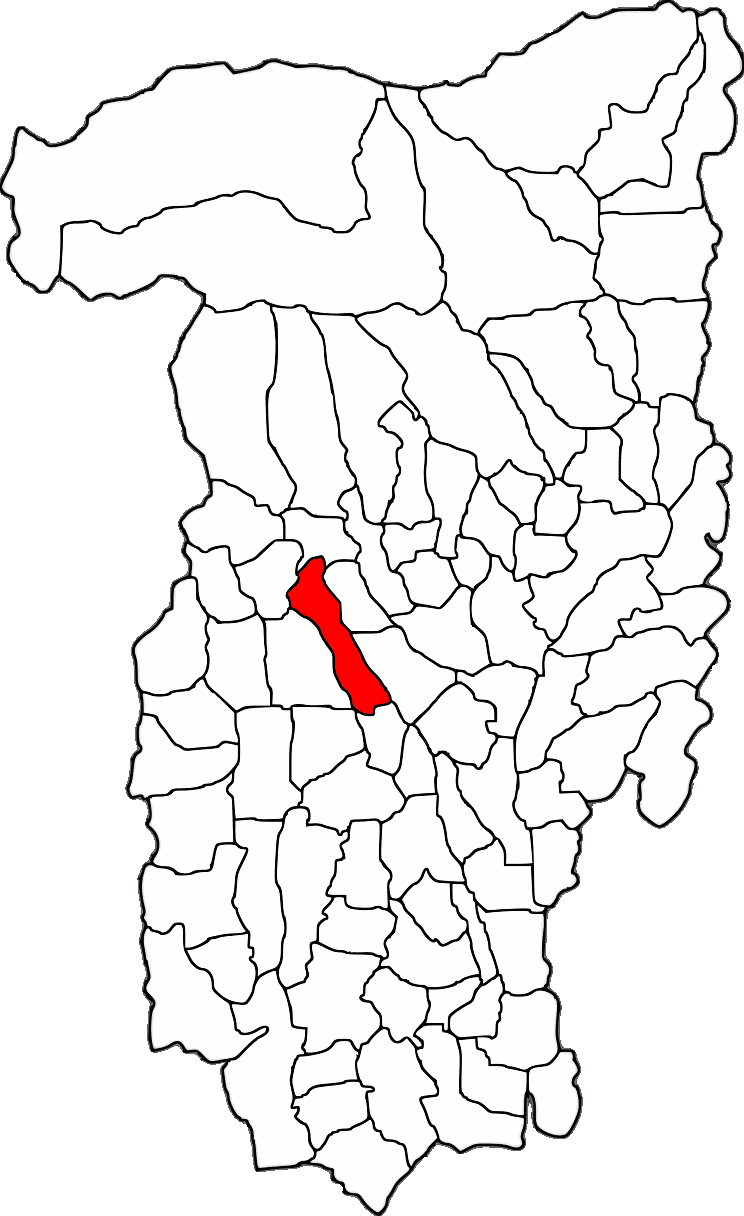
- Location in Vâlcea County

- Location in Romania
- Coordinates: 45°2′N 23°59′E
- Country: Romania
- County: Vâlcea
- Area: 59.66 km^{2} (23.03 sq mi)
- Population (2021-12-01): 3,298
  - Density: 55.28/km^{2} (143.2/sq mi)
- Time zone: UTC+02:00 (EET)
  - Summer (DST): UTC+03:00 (EEST)
- Vehicle reg.: VL

Cernișoara is a commune located in Vâlcea County, Oltenia, Romania. It is composed of seven villages: Armășești (the commune centre), Cernișoara, Groși, Mădulari, Modoia, Obârșia and Sărsănești.
