= Oboga =

- Commune
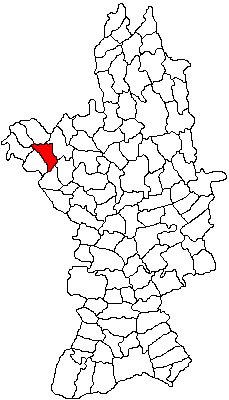
- Location in Olt County

- Location in Romania
- Coordinates: 44°25′N 24°6′E
- Country: Romania
- County: Olt

Government
  - Mayor (2020–2024): Tudor Matei (PSD)
- Area: 14.71 km^{2} (5.68 sq mi)
- Population (2021-12-01): 1,582
  - Density: 110/km^{2} (280/sq mi)
- Time zone: EET/EEST (UTC+2/+3)
- Postal code: 237290
- Vehicle reg.: OT
- Website: www.primariaoboga.ro

Oboga is a commune in Olt County, Oltenia, Romania. It is composed of a single village, Oboga. It also included Călui and Gura Căluiu villages until 2004, when they were split off to form Călui Commune.
