= Călui =

- Commune
- Location in Romania
- Coordinates: 44°27′N 24°03′E
- Country: Romania
- County: Olt
- Population (2021-12-01): 1,276
- Time zone: EET/EEST (UTC+2/+3)
- Vehicle reg.: OT

Călui is a commune in Olt County, Oltenia, Romania. It is composed of two villages, Călui and Gura Căluiu. These were part of Oboga Commune until 2004, when they were split off.
