= Stroești =

- Commune
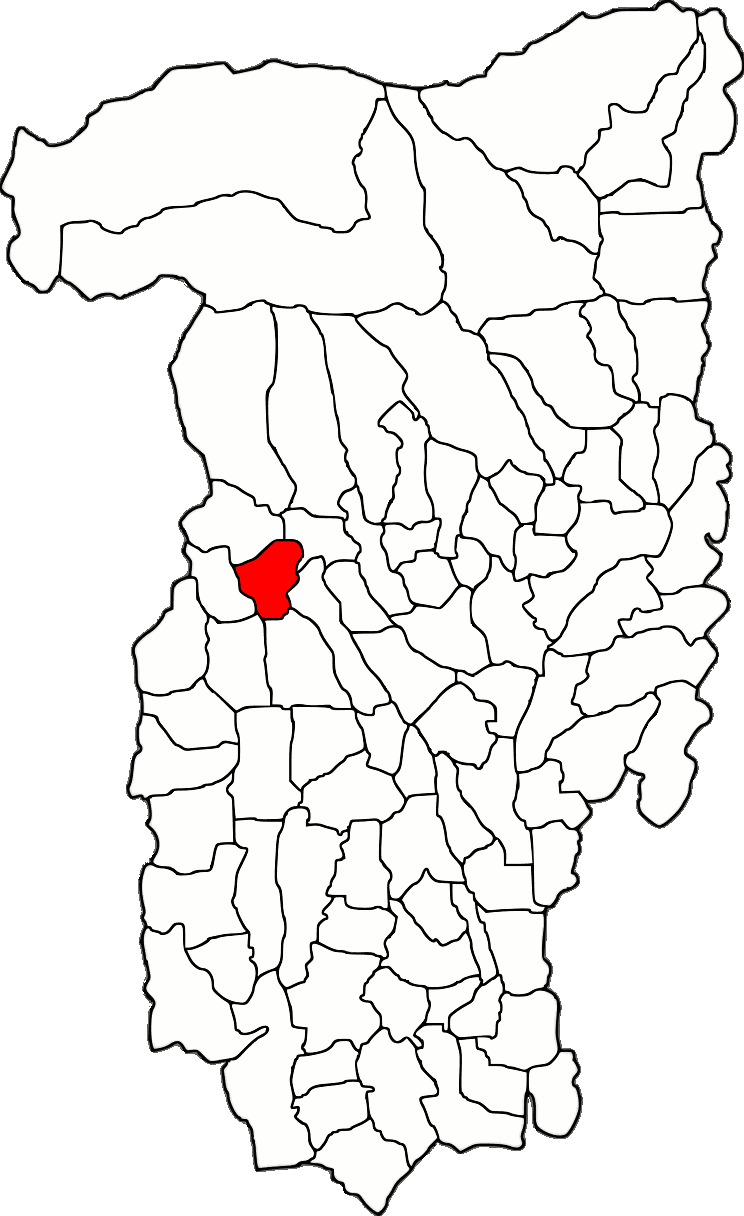
- Location in Vâlcea County

- Location in Romania
- Coordinates: 45°05′N 23°54′E
- Country: Romania
- County: Vâlcea
- Population (2021-12-01): 2,336
- Time zone: UTC+02:00 (EET)
  - Summer (DST): UTC+03:00 (EEST)
- Vehicle reg.: VL

Stroești is a commune located in Vâlcea County, Oltenia, Romania. It is composed of four villages: Cireșu, Obrocești, Pojogi-Cerna and Stroești.
