= Pesceana =

- Commune
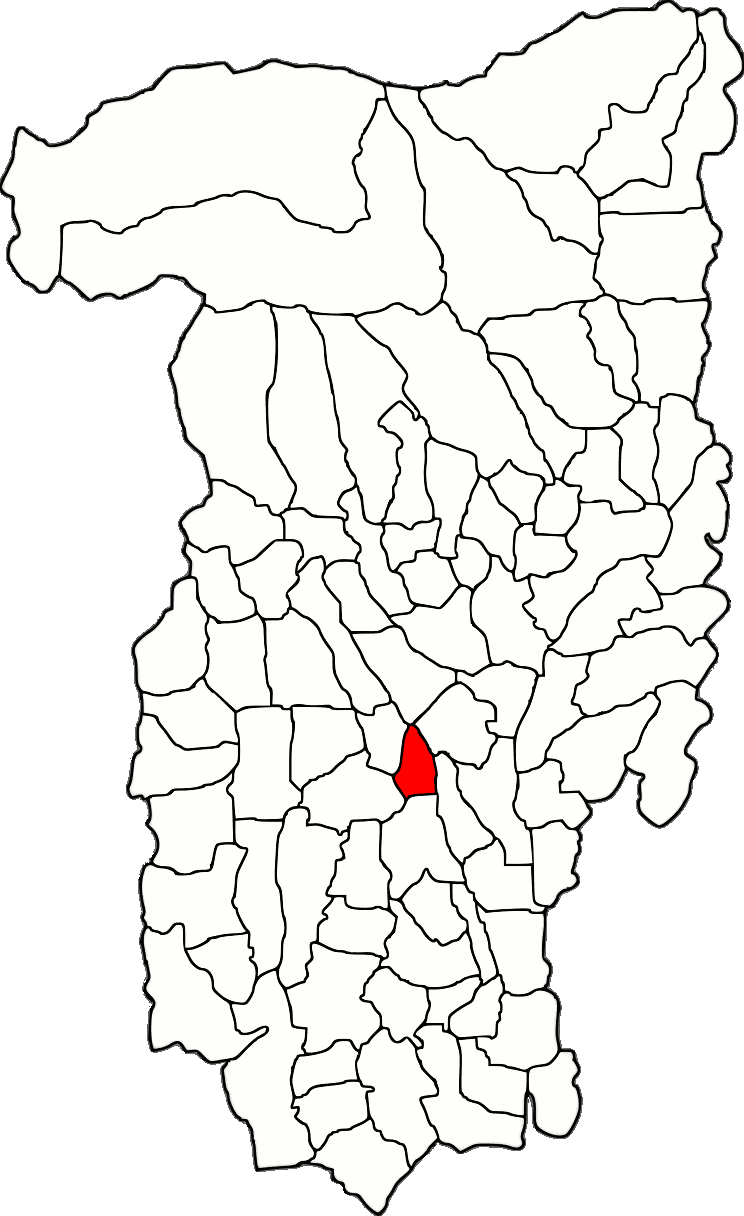
- Location in Vâlcea County

- Location in Romania
- Coordinates: 44°53′N 24°8′E
- Country: Romania
- County: Vâlcea
- Area: 28.52 km^{2} (11.01 sq mi)
- Population (2021-12-01): 1,317
  - Density: 46.18/km^{2} (119.6/sq mi)
- Time zone: UTC+02:00 (EET)
  - Summer (DST): UTC+03:00 (EEST)
- Vehicle reg.: VL

Pesceana is a commune located in Vâlcea County, Oltenia, Romania. It is composed of six villages: Cermegești, Lupoaia, Negraia, Pesceana, Roești and Ursoaia.
