= Popești, Vâlcea =

Popești
- Commune
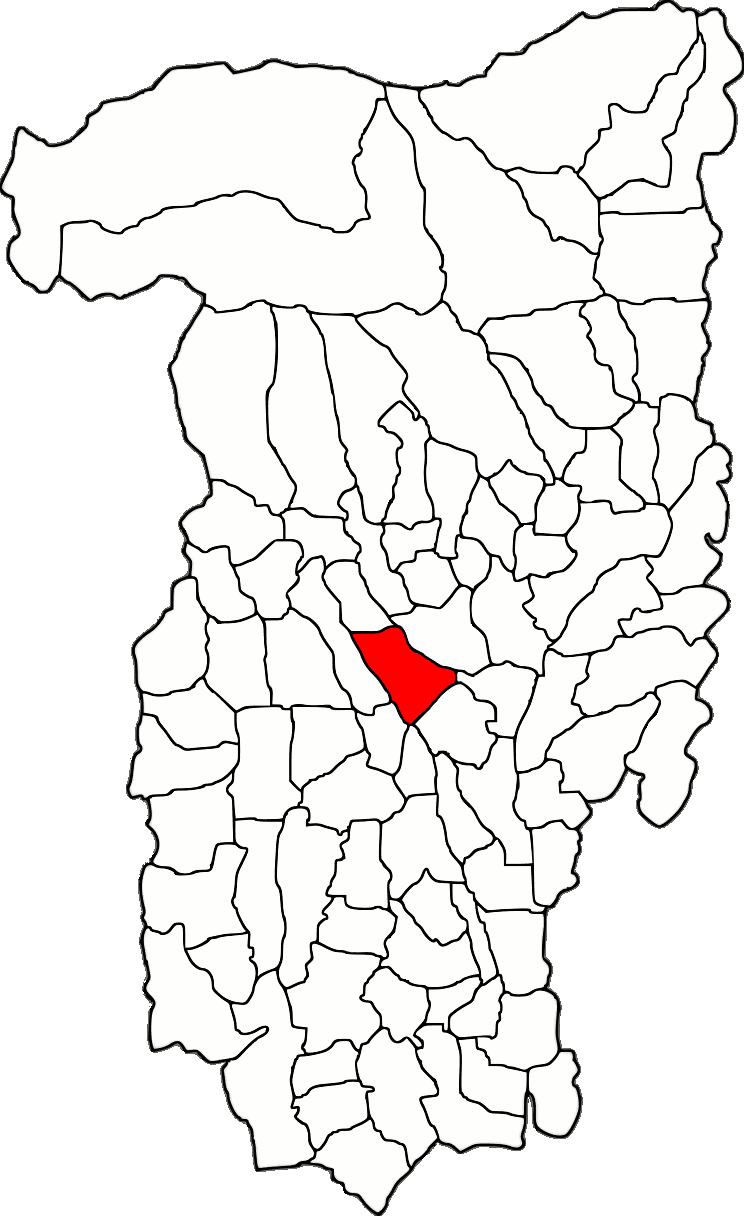
- Location in Vâlcea County

- Location in Romania
- Coordinates: 44.9858°N 24.1062°E
- Country: Romania
- County: Vâlcea
- Area: 52.75 km^{2} (20.37 sq mi)
- Population (2021-12-01): 2,857
  - Density: 54.16/km^{2} (140.3/sq mi)
- Time zone: UTC+02:00 (EET)
  - Summer (DST): UTC+03:00 (EEST)
- Vehicle reg.: VL

Popești is a commune located in Vâlcea County, Oltenia, Romania. It is composed of seven villages: Curtea, Dăești, Firijba, Meieni, Popești, Urși and Valea Caselor.
