= Făurești =

- Commune
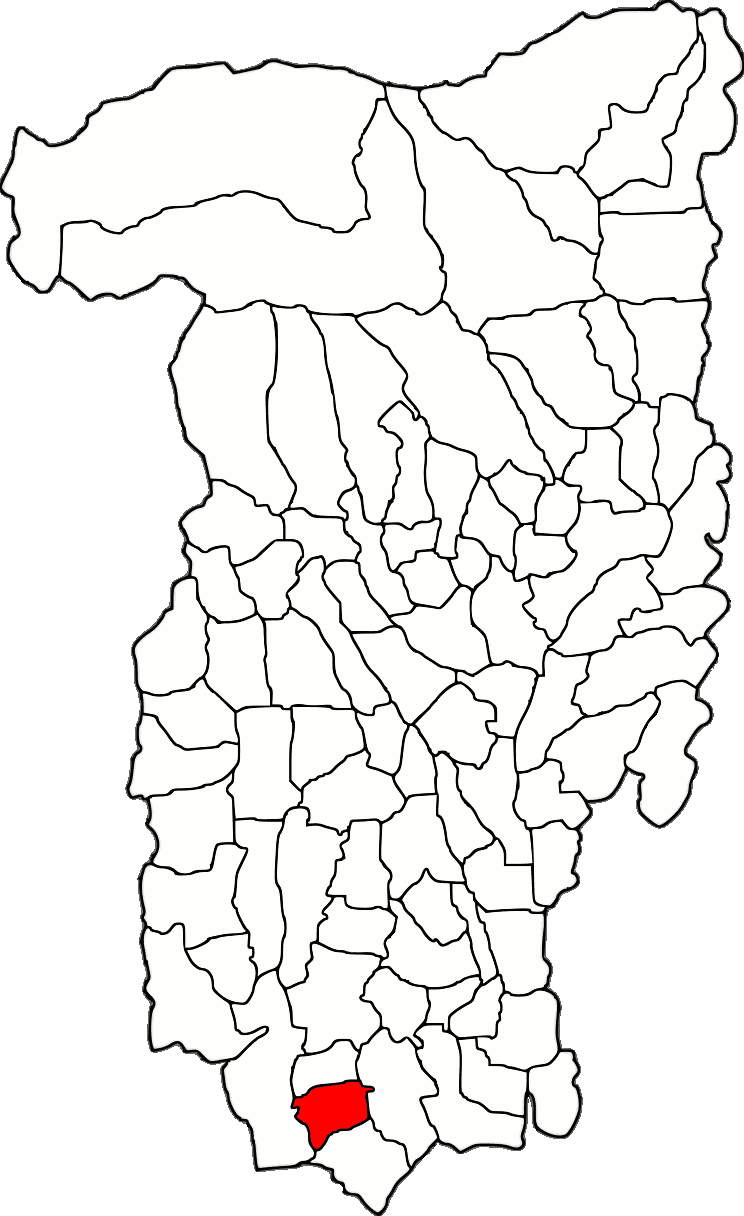
- Location in Vâlcea County

- Location in Romania
- Coordinates: 44°34′N 24°1′E
- Country: Romania
- County: Vâlcea
- Population (2021-12-01): 1,224
- Time zone: EET/EEST (UTC+2/+3)
- Vehicle reg.: VL

Făurești is a commune located in Vâlcea County, Oltenia, Romania. It is composed of five villages: Bungețani, Făurești, Găinești, Mărcușu and Milești (the commune centre). It also included the villages of Băbeni-Oltețu, Budești, Colelia and Diculești until 2004, when these were split off to form Diculești Commune.
