= Copăceni, Vâlcea =

Copăceni
- Commune
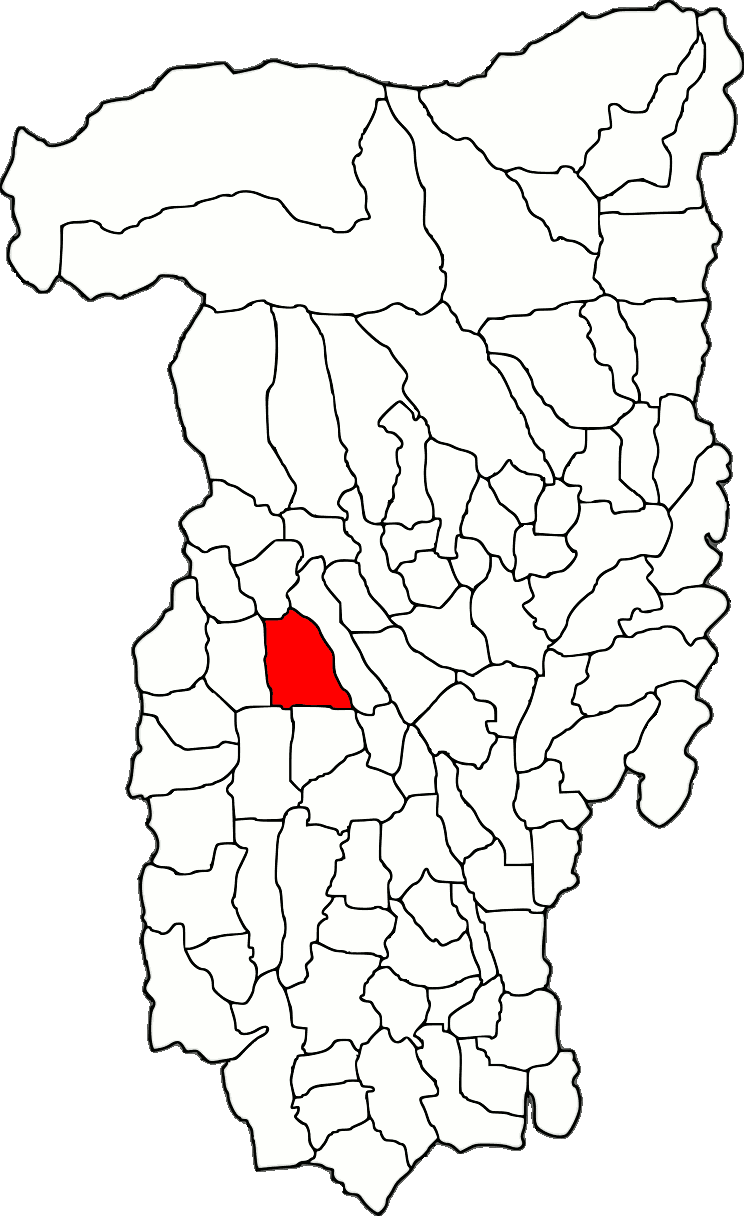
- Location in Vâlcea County

- Location in Romania
- Coordinates: 45°00′N 23°59′E
- Country: Romania
- County: Vâlcea
- Area: 63 km^{2} (24 sq mi)
- Population (2021-12-01): 2,468
  - Density: 39/km^{2} (100/sq mi)
- Time zone: UTC+02:00 (EET)
  - Summer (DST): UTC+03:00 (EEST)
- Vehicle reg.: VL

Copăceni is a commune located in Vâlcea County, Oltenia, Romania. It is composed of six villages: Bălteni, Bondoci, Copăceni, Hotărasa, Ulmetu (the commune centre) and Vețelu.
