= Stănești, Vâlcea =

Stănești
- Commune
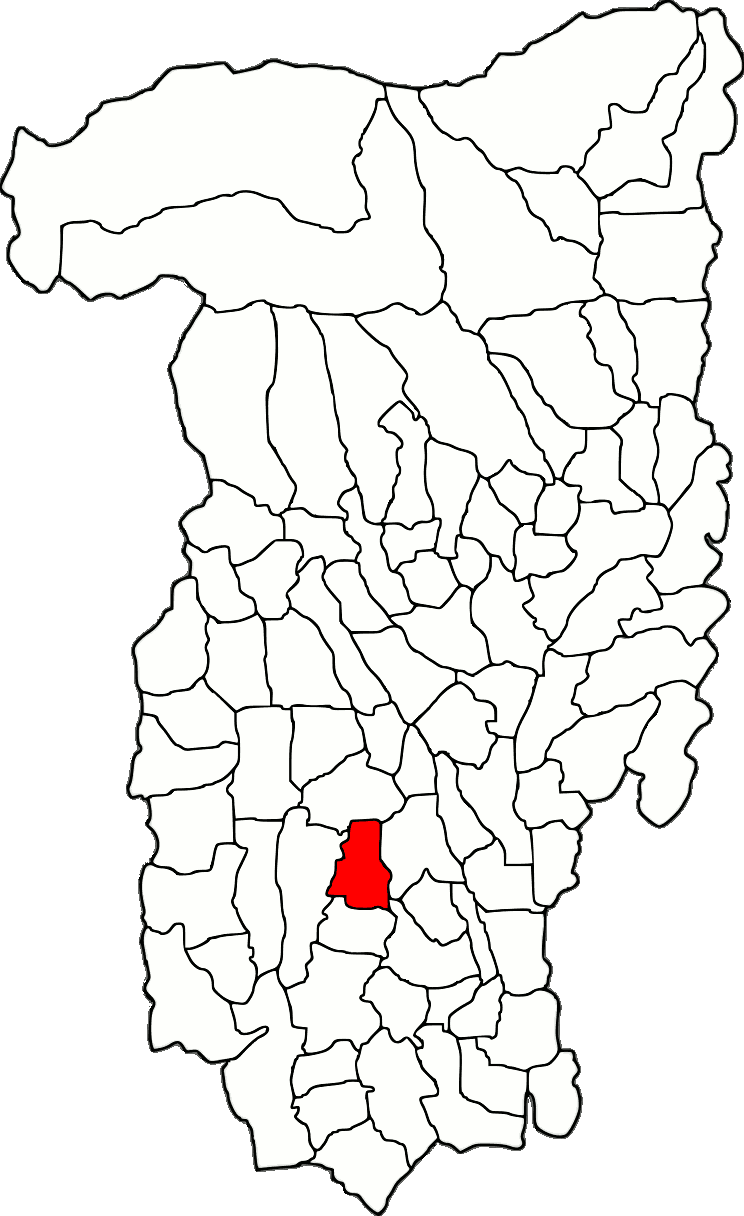
- Location in Vâlcea County

- Location in Romania
- Coordinates: 44.8046°N 24.0354°E
- Country: Romania
- County: Vâlcea
- Area: 33 km^{2} (13 sq mi)
- Population (2021-12-01): 989
  - Density: 30/km^{2} (78/sq mi)
- Time zone: UTC+02:00 (EET)
  - Summer (DST): UTC+03:00 (EEST)
- Vehicle reg.: VL

Stănești is a commune located in Vâlcea County, Oltenia, Romania. It is composed of nine villages: Bărcănești, Cioponești, Cuculești, Gârnicetu, Linia Dealului, Stănești, Suiești, Valea Lungă and Vârleni.
