= Diculești =

- Commune
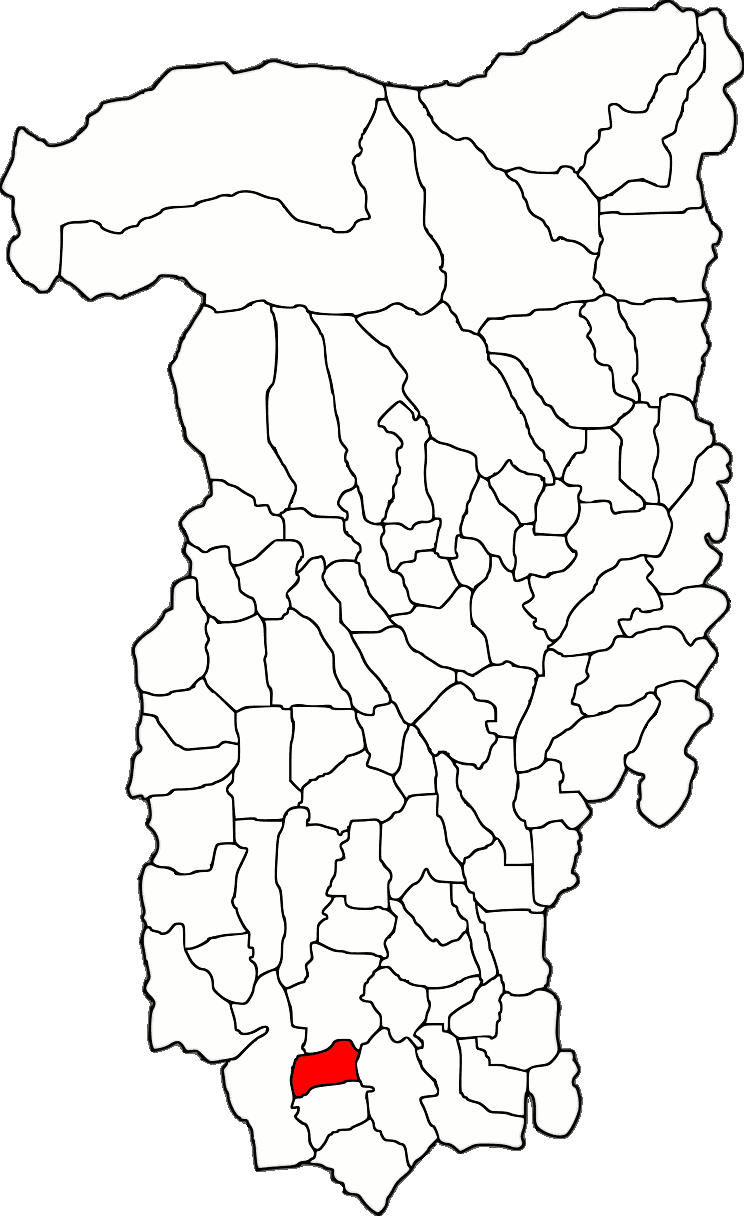
- Location in Vâlcea County

- Location in Romania
- Coordinates: 44.6184°N 23.9904°E
- Country: Romania
- County: Vâlcea
- Population (2021-12-01): 1,684
- Time zone: EET/EEST (UTC+2/+3)
- Vehicle reg.: VL

Diculești is a commune located in Vâlcea County, Oltenia, Romania. It is composed of four villages: Băbeni-Oltețu (the commune centre), Budești, Colelia and Diculești. These were part of Făurești Commune until 2004, when they were split off.
