= Laloșu =

- Commune
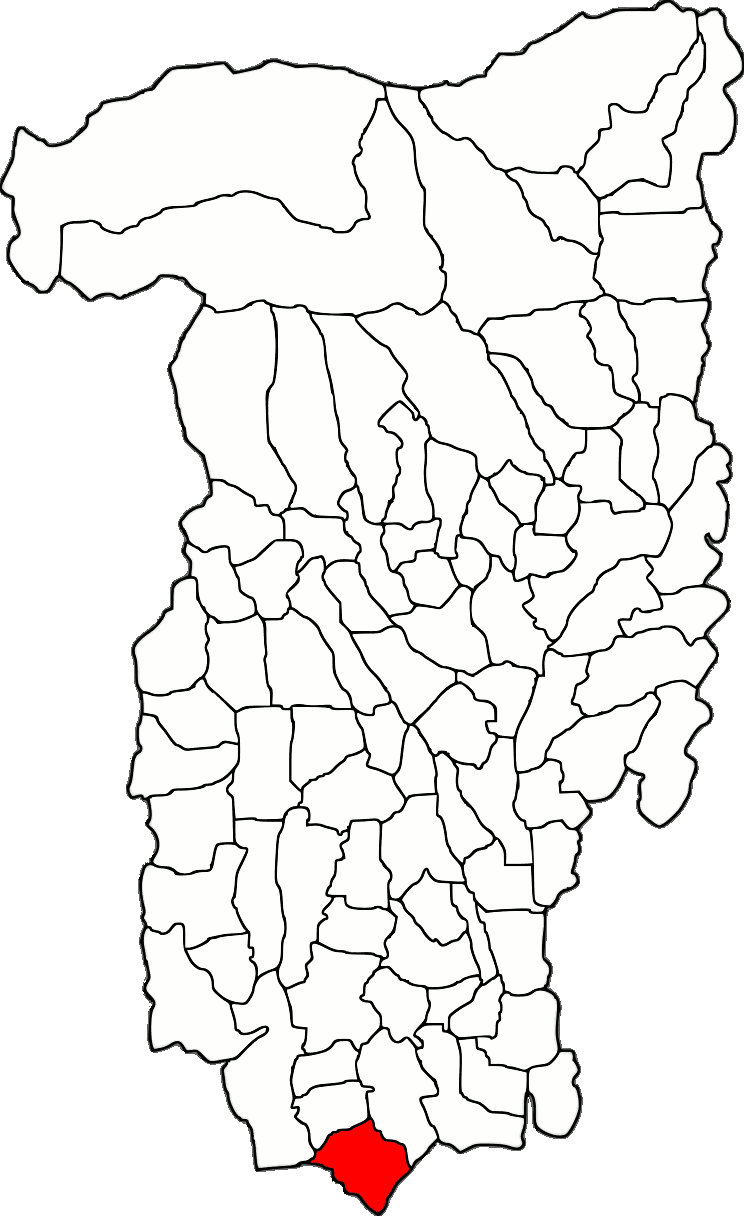
- Location in Vâlcea County

- Location in Romania
- Coordinates: 44°33′N 24°1′E
- Country: Romania
- County: Vâlcea
- Area: 43.81 km^{2} (16.92 sq mi)
- Population (2021-12-01): 2,164
  - Density: 49.40/km^{2} (127.9/sq mi)
- Time zone: UTC+02:00 (EET)
  - Summer (DST): UTC+03:00 (EEST)
- Vehicle reg.: VL

Laloșu is a commune located in Vâlcea County, Oltenia, Romania. It is composed of six villages: Ghindari, Laloșu, Portărești, Mologești, Berbești and Oltețani.
