= Valea Mare, Vâlcea =

Valea Mare
- Commune
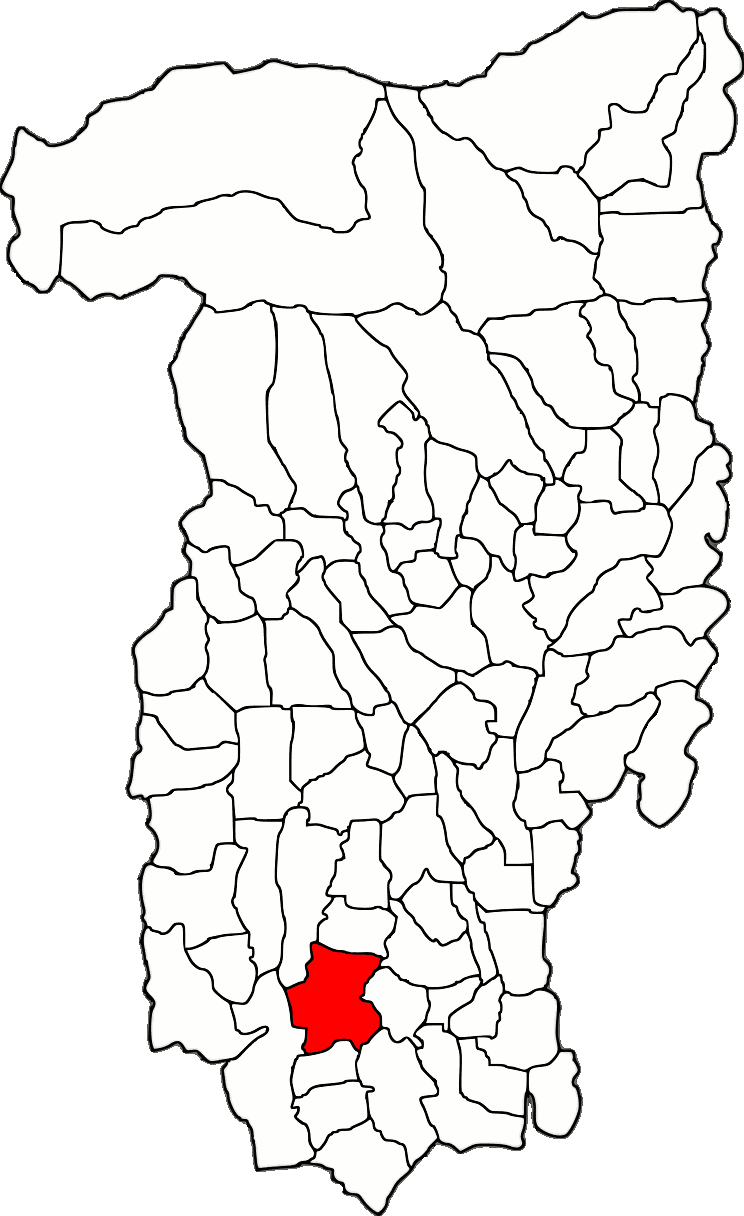
- Location in Vâlcea County

- Location in Romania
- Coordinates: 44°40′N 24°0′E
- Country: Romania
- County: Vâlcea
- Area: 73.67 km^{2} (28.44 sq mi)
- Population (2021-12-01): 2,363
  - Density: 32.08/km^{2} (83.08/sq mi)
- Time zone: UTC+02:00 (EET)
  - Summer (DST): UTC+03:00 (EEST)
- Vehicle reg.: VL

Valea Mare is a commune located in Vâlcea County, Oltenia, Romania. It is composed of six villages: Bătășani, Delureni, Drăganu, Mărgineni, Pietroasa and Valea Mare.
