= Vaideeni =

- Commune
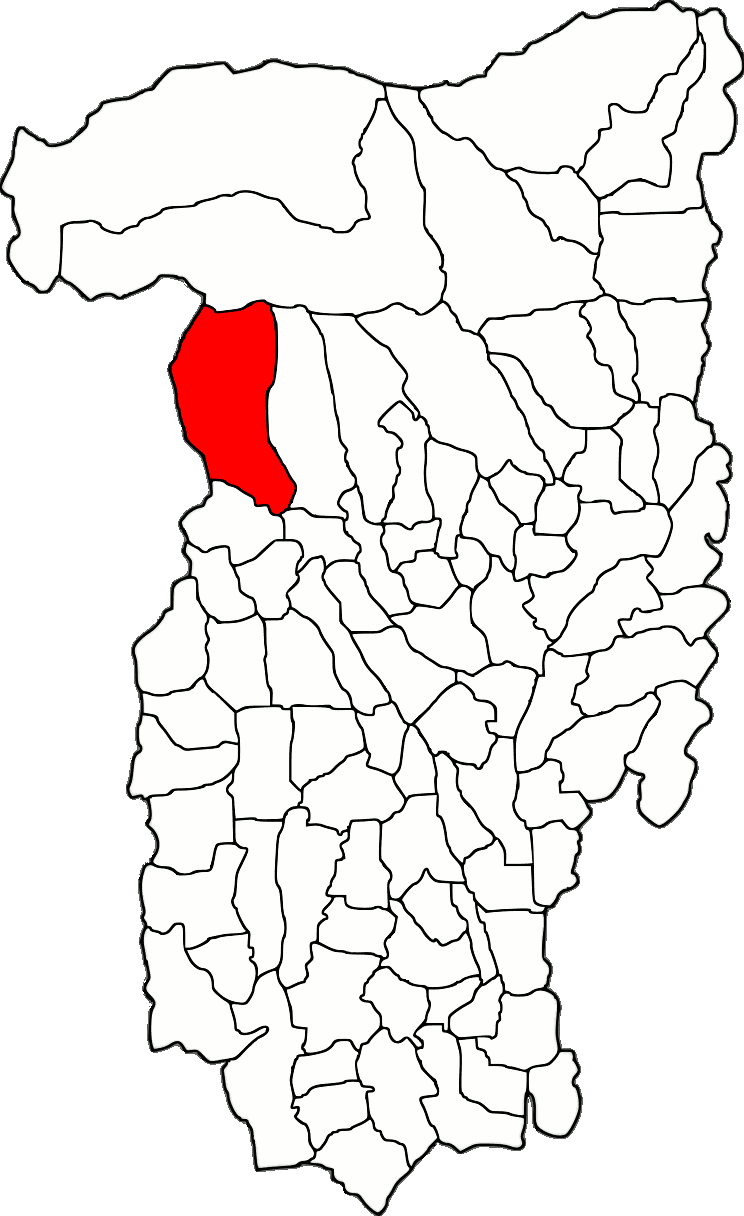
- Location in Vâlcea County

- Location in Romania
- Coordinates: 45°10′N 23°56′E
- Country: Romania
- County: Vâlcea

Government
  - Mayor (2020–2024): Achim Daniel Băluță (PSD)
- Area: 157.59 km^{2} (60.85 sq mi)
- Elevation: 564 m (1,850 ft)
- Population (2021-12-01): 3,634
  - Density: 23/km^{2} (60/sq mi)
- Time zone: EET/EEST (UTC+2/+3)
- Postal code: 247725
- Area code: +(40) 250
- Vehicle reg.: VL
- Website: primaria-vaideeni.ro

Vaideeni is a commune located in Vâlcea County, Oltenia, Romania. It is composed of five villages: Cerna, Cornetu, Izvoru Rece, Marița, and Vaideeni.

== Natives ==
- Dan Adamescu (1948–2017), businessman
