= Sinești, Vâlcea =

Sinești
- Commune
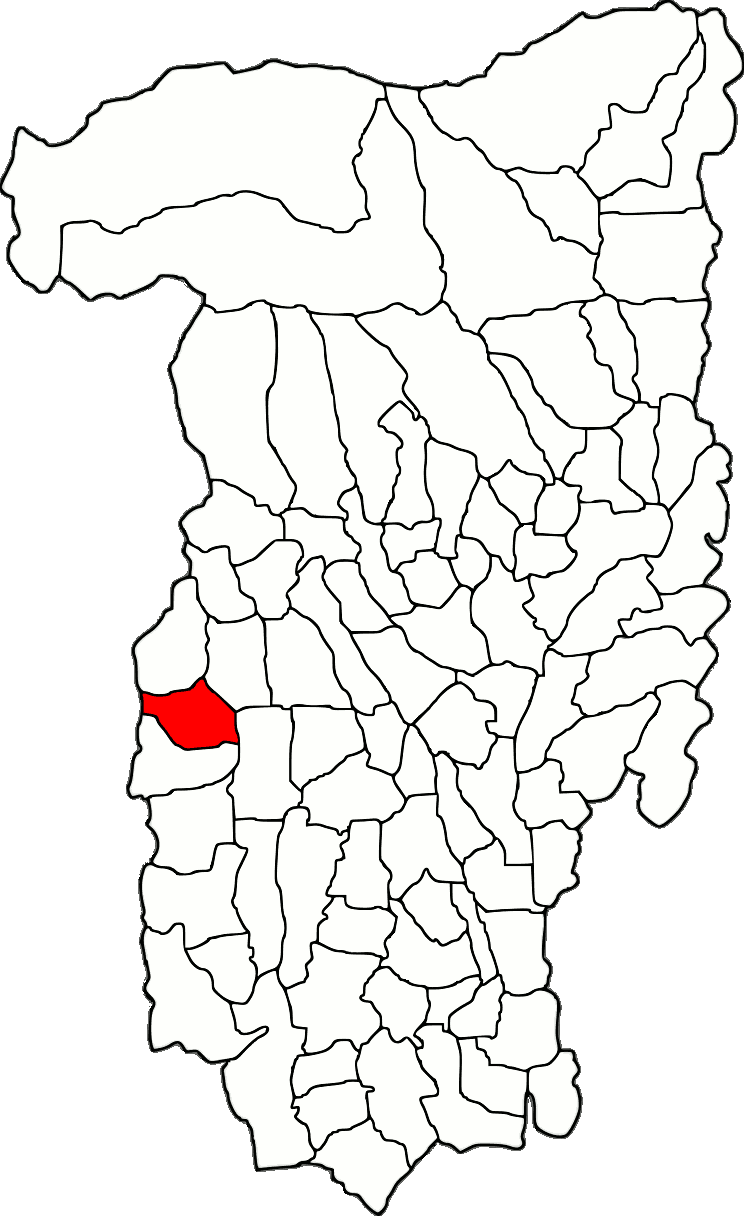
- Location in Vâlcea County

- Location in Romania
- Coordinates: 44.944°N 23.839°E
- Country: Romania
- County: Vâlcea
- Area: 42.47 km^{2} (16.40 sq mi)
- Population (2021-12-01): 2,181
  - Density: 51.35/km^{2} (133.0/sq mi)
- Time zone: UTC+02:00 (EET)
  - Summer (DST): UTC+03:00 (EEST)
- Vehicle reg.: VL

Sinești is a commune located in Vâlcea County, Oltenia, Romania. It is composed of six villages: Ciucheți, Dealu Bisericii, Mijlocu, Popești, Sinești and Urzica.
