= Roești =

- Commune
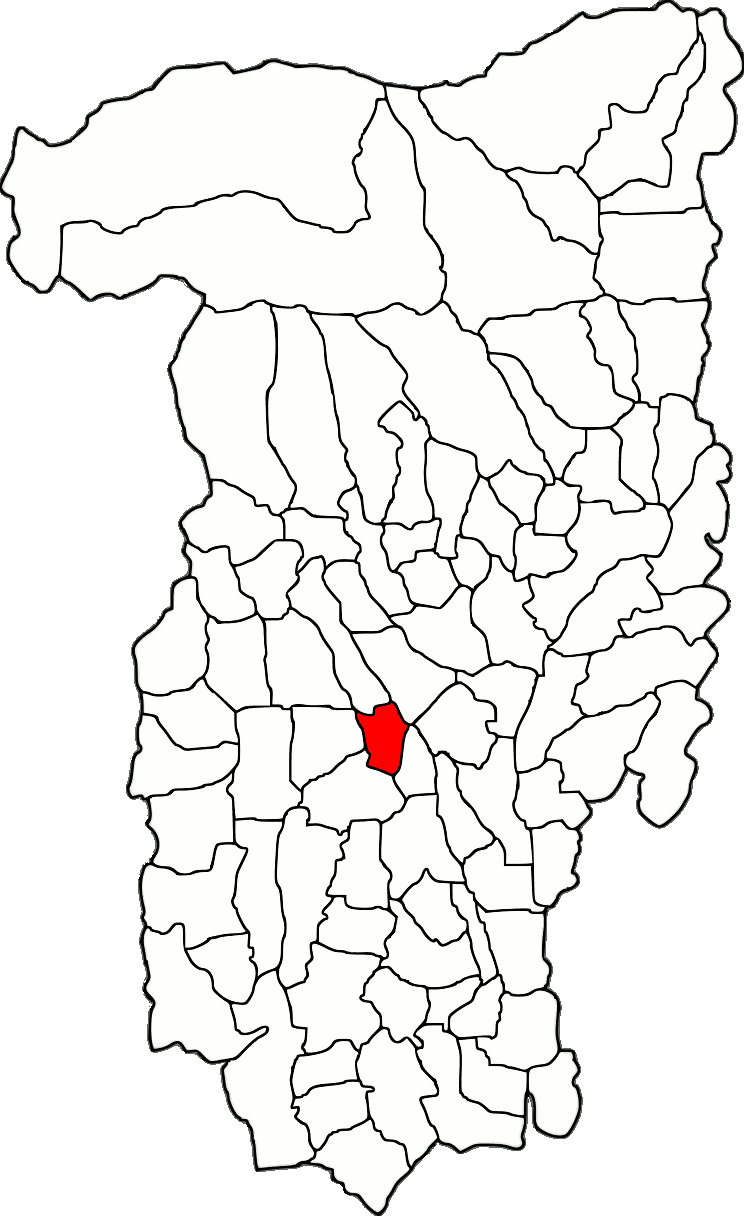
- Location in Vâlcea County

- Location in Romania
- Coordinates: 44.9308°N 24.0874°E
- Country: Romania
- County: Vâlcea
- Population (2021-12-01): 1,942
- Time zone: EET/EEST (UTC+2/+3)
- Vehicle reg.: VL

Roești is a commune located in Vâlcea County, Oltenia, Romania. It is composed of ten villages: Băiașa, Băjenari, Bărbărigeni, Ciocâltei, Cueni, Frasina, Piscu Scoarței, Roești, Râpa Cărămizii, and Saioci.

== Natives ==
- Dem. Theodorescu
