= Fârtățești =

- Commune
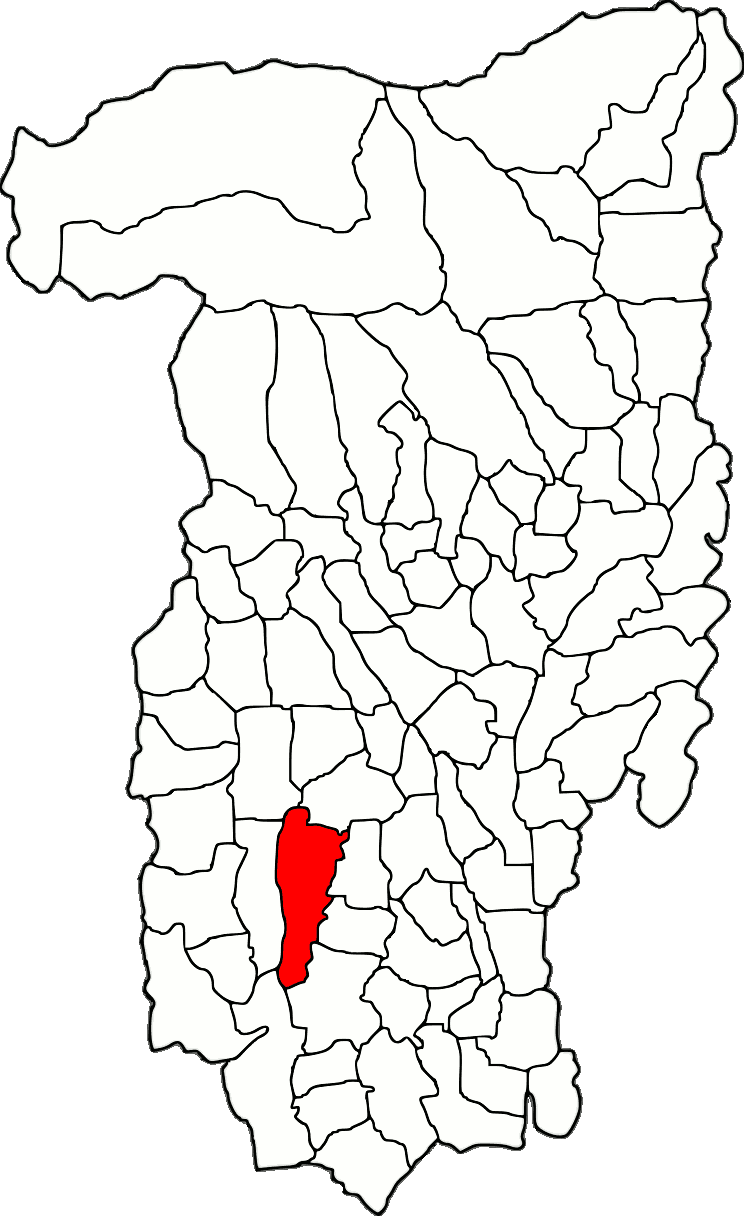
- Location in Vâlcea County

- Location in Romania
- Coordinates: 44°47′N 24°0′E
- Country: Romania
- County: Vâlcea
- Area: 44.35 km^{2} (17.12 sq mi)
- Population (2021-12-01): 3,262
  - Density: 73.55/km^{2} (190.5/sq mi)
- Time zone: UTC+02:00 (EET)
  - Summer (DST): UTC+03:00 (EEST)
- Vehicle reg.: VL

Fârtățești is a commune located in Vâlcea County, Oltenia, Romania. It is composed of twenty villages: Afânata, Becșani, Cățetu, Cuci, Dăncăi, Dejoi, Dozești, Fârtățești, Gârnicet, Giulești, Giuleștii de Sus, Măricești, Nisipi, Popești, Rusănești, Seciu, Șotani, Stănculești, Tanislavi and Valea Ursului.
