= Lădești =

- Commune
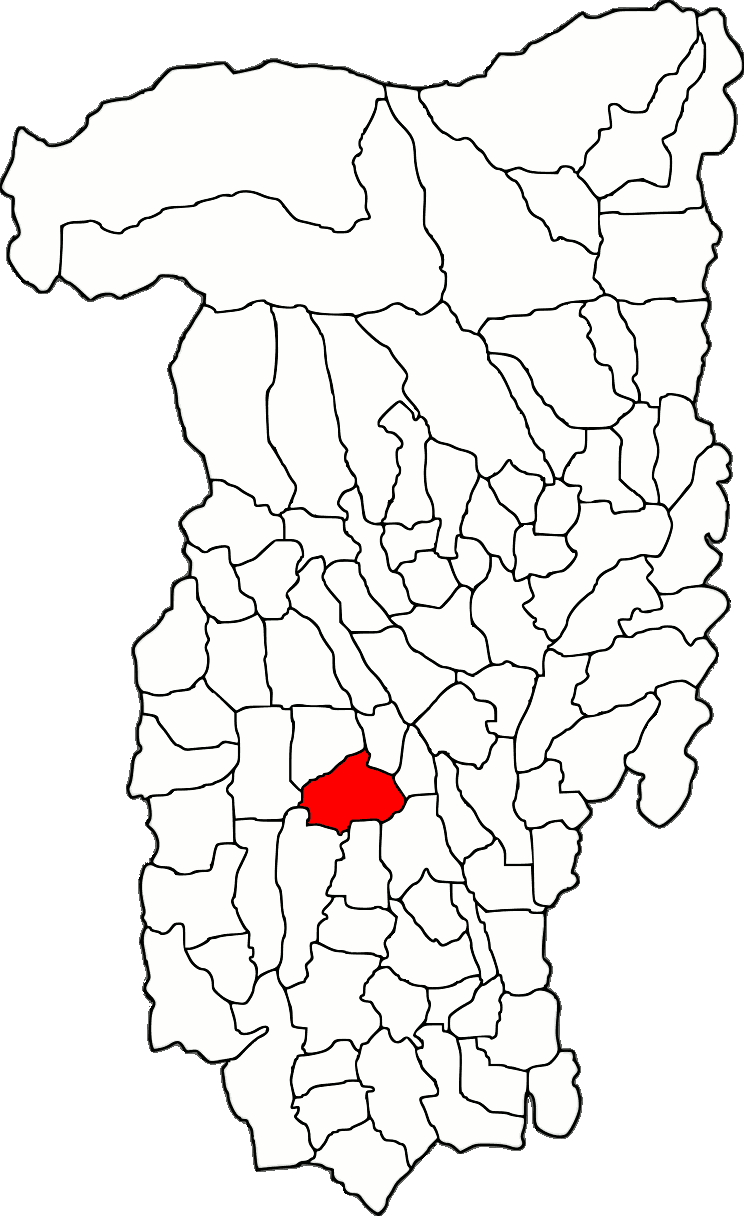
- Location in Vâlcea County

- Location in Romania
- Coordinates: 44°53′N 24°3′E
- Country: Romania
- County: Vâlcea
- Area: 50.14 km^{2} (19.36 sq mi)
- Population (2021-12-01): 1,563
  - Density: 31.17/km^{2} (80.74/sq mi)
- Time zone: UTC+02:00 (EET)
  - Summer (DST): UTC+03:00 (EEST)
- Vehicle reg.: VL

Lădești is a commune located in Vâlcea County, Oltenia, Romania. It is composed of ten villages: Cermegești, Chiricești, Ciumagi, Dealu Corni, Găgeni, Lădești, Măldărești, Olteanca, Păsculești and Popești.

The river Cerna passes by the commune Lădești.

== Natives ==
- Virgil Ierunca, literary critic, poet
