= Slătioara, Vâlcea =

Slătioara
- Commune
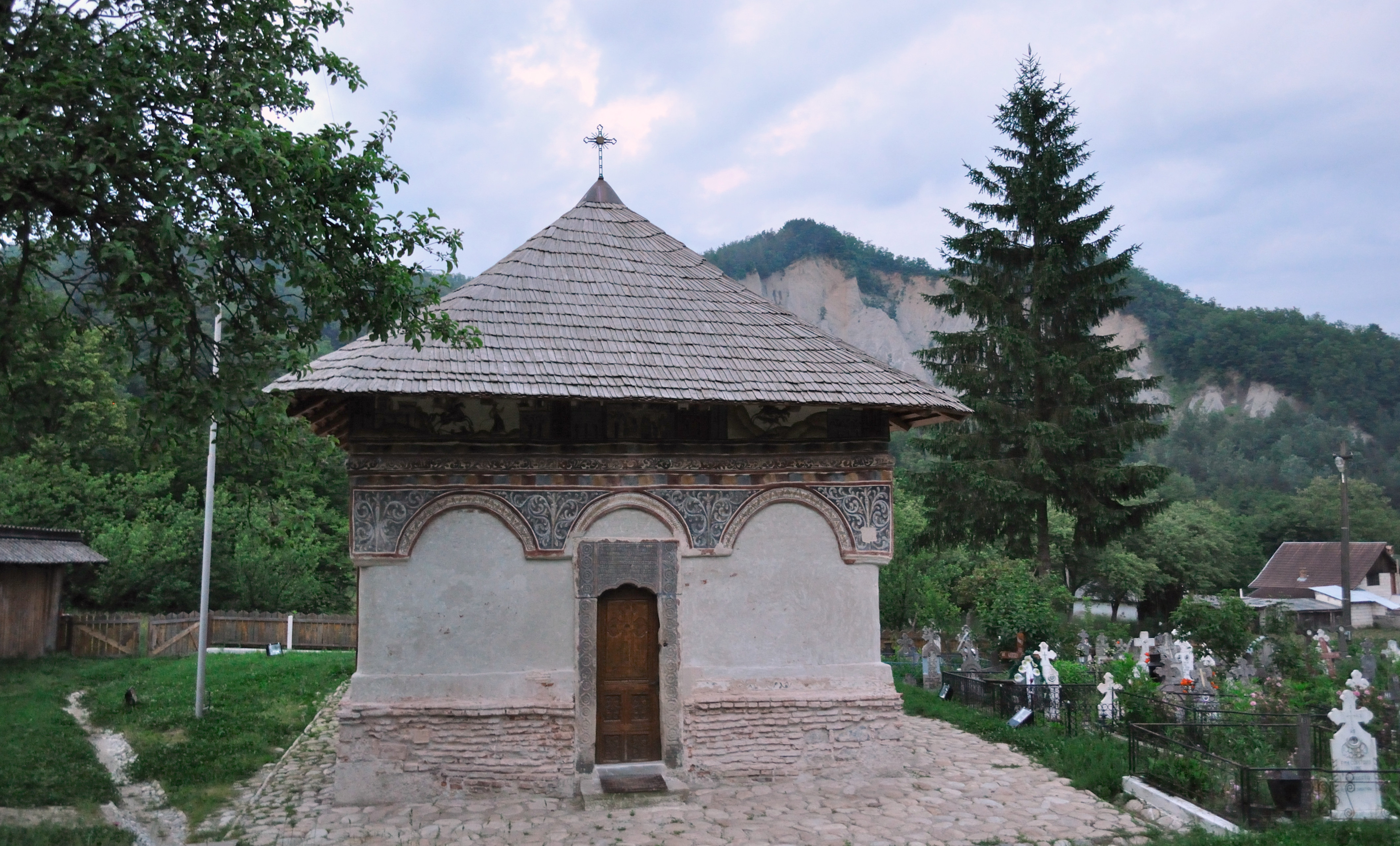
- Presentation of Mary Church in Gorunești

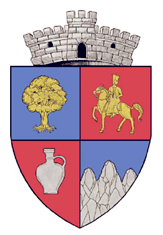
- Coat of arms

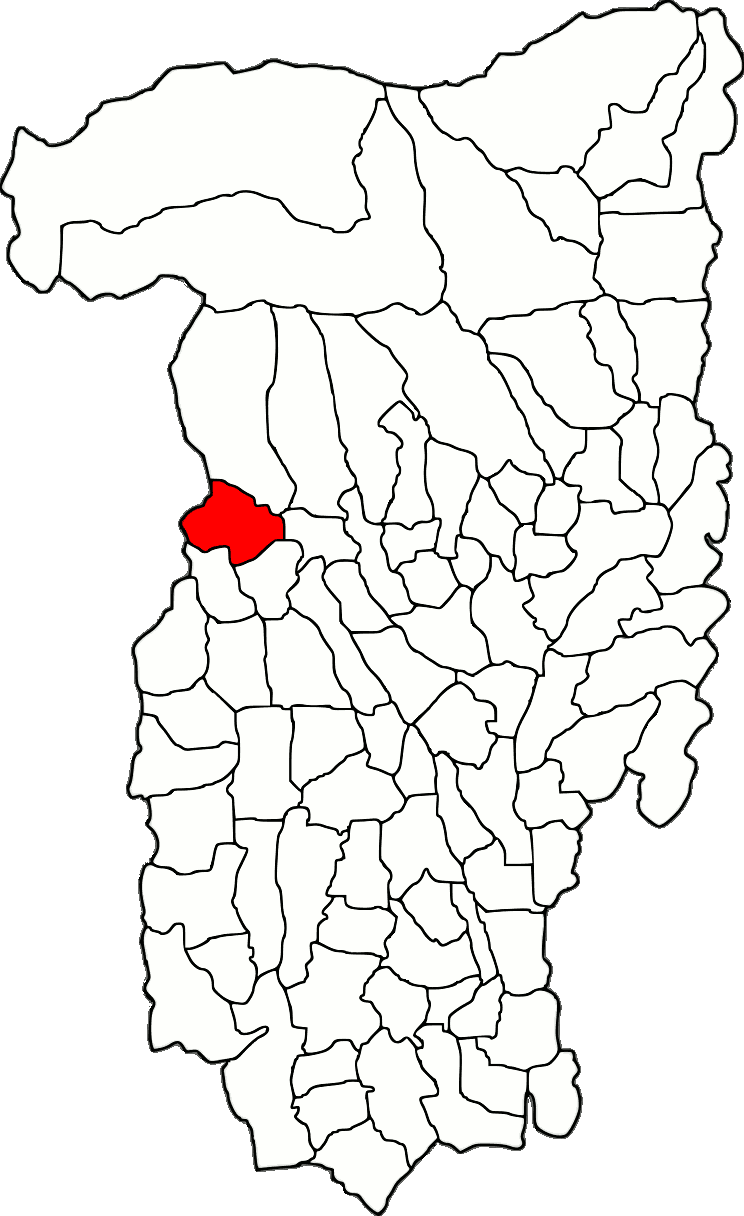
- Location in Vâlcea County

- Location in Romania
- Coordinates: 45°07′23″N 23°54′28″E
- Country: Romania
- County: Vâlcea

Government
  - Mayor (2024–2028): Cristian-Sorin Romcescu (PSD)
- Area: 41.35 km^{2} (15.97 sq mi)
- Elevation: 485 m (1,591 ft)
- Population (2021-12-01): 3,366
  - Density: 81.40/km^{2} (210.8/sq mi)
- Time zone: UTC+02:00 (EET)
  - Summer (DST): UTC+03:00 (EEST)
- Postal code: 247605
- Area code: +(40) 250
- Vehicle reg.: VL
- Website: comunaslatioara.ro

Slătioara is a commune located in Vâlcea County, Oltenia, Romania. It is composed of six villages: Coasta Cerbului, Gorunești, Milostea, Mogești, Rugetu, and Slătioara.

== Natives ==
- Dinu Săraru (1932 – 2024), novelist and playwright
