= Vâlcea County =

County of Romania

Vâlcea County Județul Vâlcea
- County
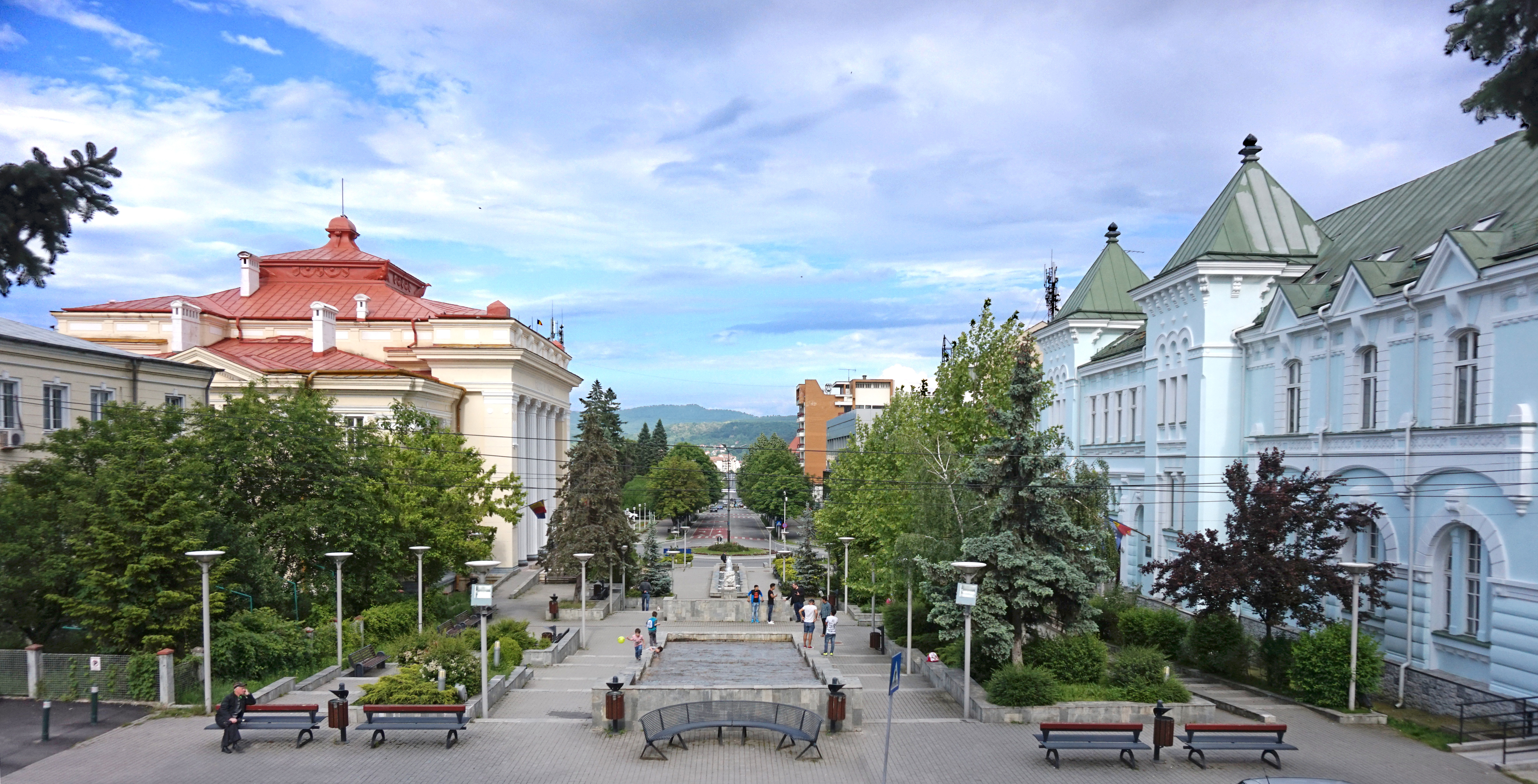
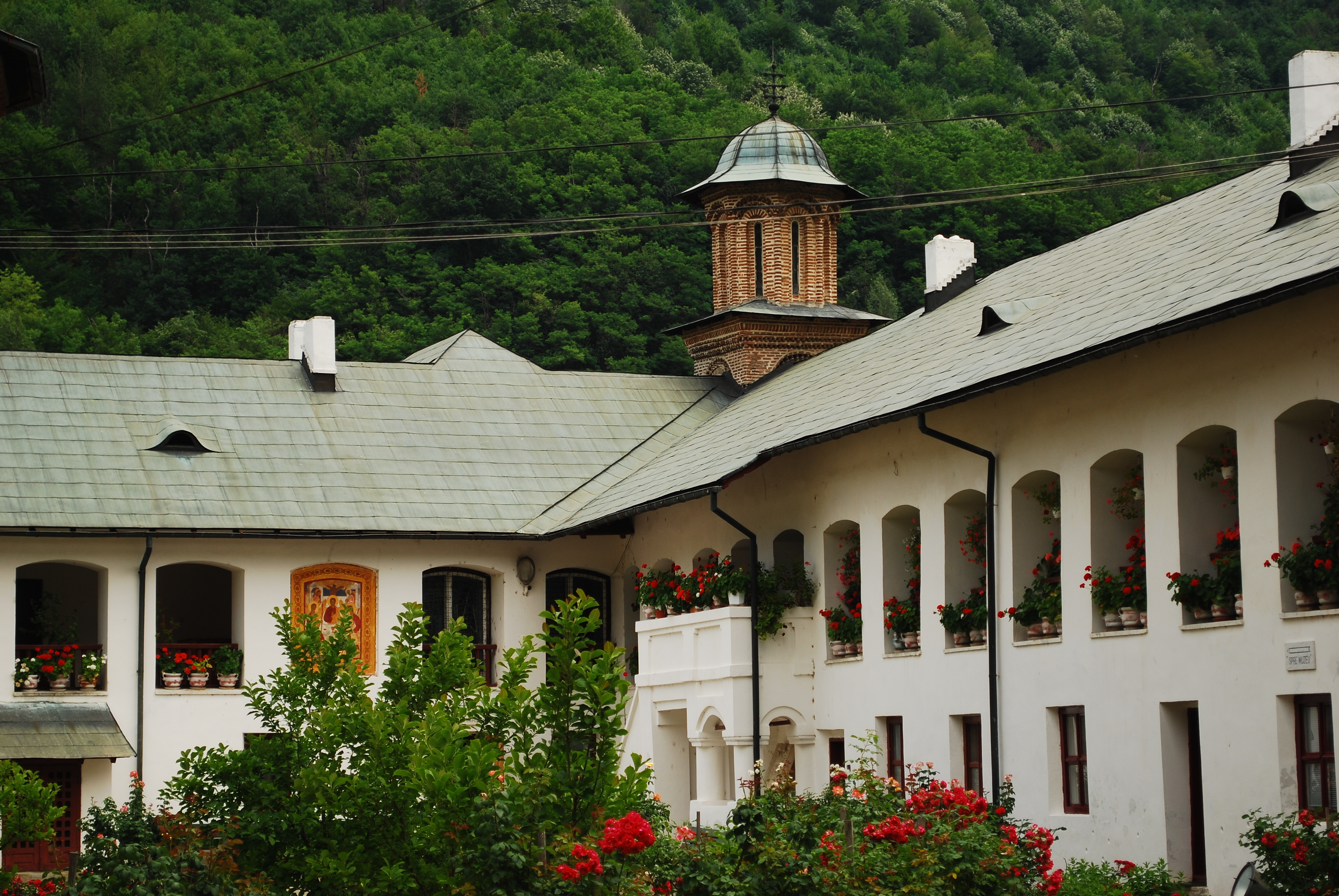
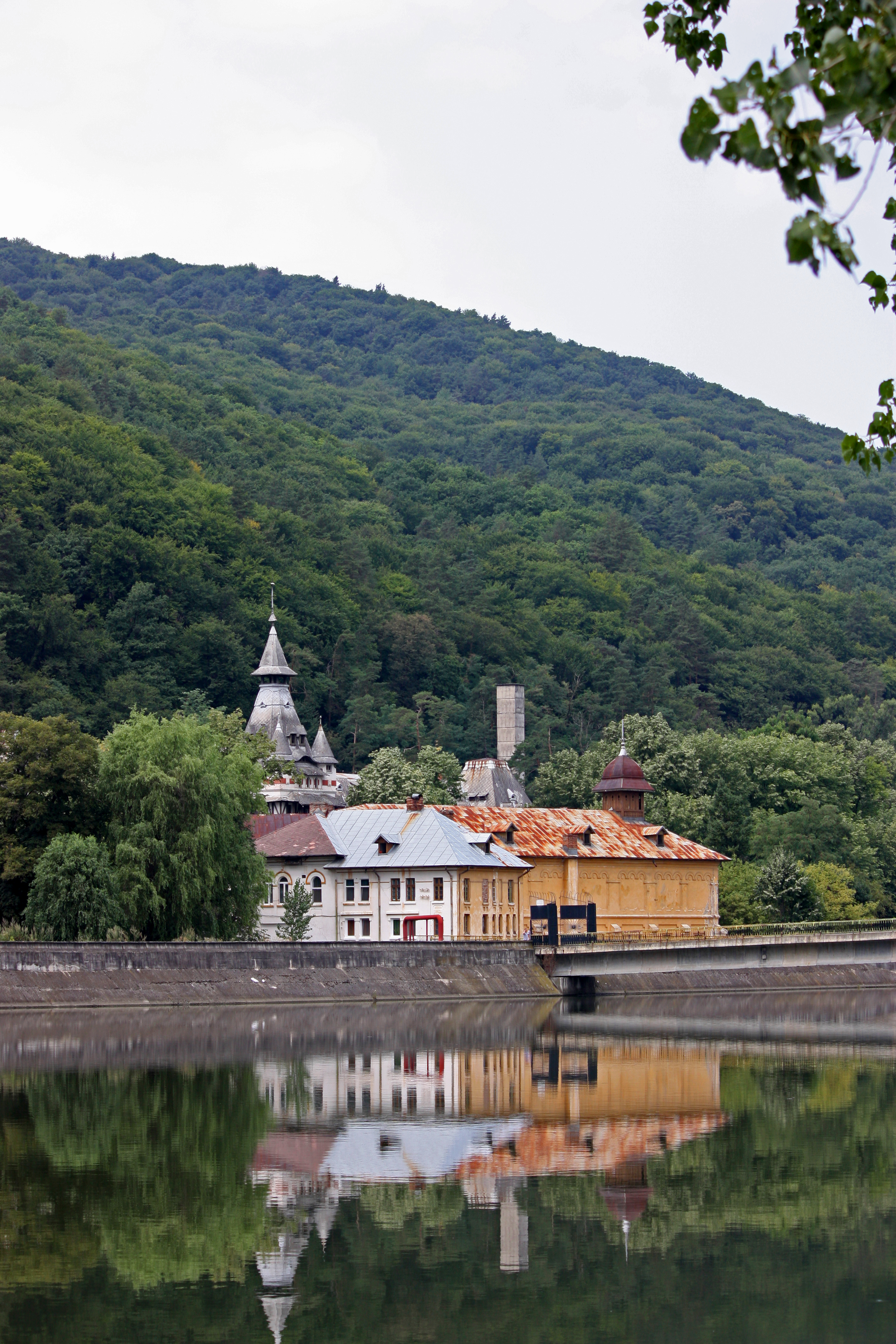
- Râmnicu Vâlcea Cozia Monastery Călimănești

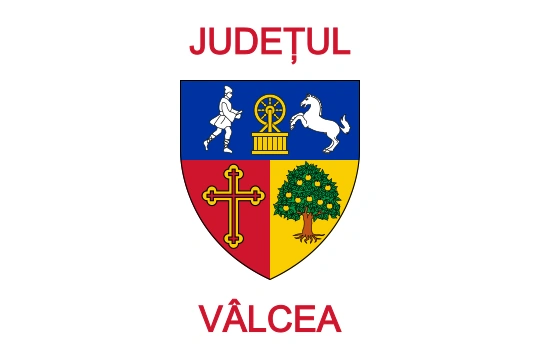
- Flag Coat of arms

- Coordinates: 45.08°N 24.11°E
- Country: Romania
- Development region: Sud-Vest
- Historical region: Muntenia, Oltenia
- Capital: Râmnicu Vâlcea

Government
  - President of the County Board: Constantin Rădulescu (PSD)
  - Prefect: Mihai Oprea

Area
  - Total: 5,765 km^{2} (2,226 sq mi)
  - Rank: 20th

Population (2021-12-01)
  - Total: 341,861
  - Rank: 26th
  - Density: 59.30/km^{2} (153.6/sq mi)
- Telephone code: (+40) 250 or (+40) 350
- ISO 3166 code: RO-VL
- GDP (nominal): US$ 2.436 billion (2015)
- GDP per capita: US$ 6,855 (2015)
- Website: County Council; County Prefecture

Vâlcea County (also spelt Vîlcea; Romanian pronunciation: [ˈvɨlt͡ʃe̯a]) is a county (județ) that lies in south-central Romania. Located in the historical regions of Oltenia and Muntenia (which are separated by the Olt River), it is also part of the wider Wallachia region. Its capital city is Râmnicu Vâlcea.

== Demographics ==
In 2011, it had a population of 355,320 and the population density was 61.63/km^{2}.

- Romanians - over 98%
- Roma, others - c. 2%

| Year | County population |
|---|---|
| 1948 | 341,590 |
| 1956 | 362,356 ▲ |
| 1966 | 368,779 ▲ |
| 1977 | 414,241 ▲ |
| 1992 | 436,298 ▲ |
| 2002 | 413,247 ▼ |
| 2011 | 355,320 ▼ |
| 2021 | 341,861 ▼ |

== Geography ==
This county has a total area of 5,765 km^{2} (2,226 sq mi).

The North side of the county is occupied by the mountains from the Southern Carpathians group: the Făgăraș Mountains in the east with heights over 2,200 m (7,200 ft), and the Lotru Mountains in the west with heights over 2,000 m (6,600 ft). They are separated by the Olt River valley — the most accessible passage between Transylvania and Muntenia. Along the Olt River valley there are smaller groups of mountains, the most spectacular being the Cozia Mountains.

Towards the South, the heights decrease, passing through the sub-carpathian hills to a high plain in the West side of the Wallachian Plain.

The main river is the Olt River crossing the county from North to South. Its main affluents are the Lotru River in the North and the Olteț River in the South.

=== Neighbours ===
- Argeș County in the East.
- Gorj County and Hunedoara County in the West.
- Sibiu County and Alba County in the North.
- Dolj County and Olt County in the South.

== Economy ==
The predominant industries in the county are:

- Chemical industry.
- Food and beverage industry.
- Textile industry.
- Mechanical components industry.
- Construction materials.
- Wood and furniture industry.

In the West of the county coal and salt are extracted.

The area in the center of the county is well suited for fruit orchards, vineyards, and raising cattle. The South is better suited for growing cereals and vegetables.

== Tourism ==
The main tourist destinations are:

- The Olt River valley:
  - The Călimănești-Căciulata resorts.
  - The Cozia Monastery.
  - The Turnu Monastery.
  - The Cozia Mountains.
  - Various small churches and fortifications.
- The Lotru River valley:
  - The town of Brezoi.
  - The Lotru Mountains.
  - The Voineasa resort.
  - The Vidra resort
  - The Obârșia Lotrului resort.
- The city of Râmnicu Vâlcea.
- The Băile Govora resort.
- The Băile Olănești resort.

== Politics ==
The Vâlcea County Council, renewed at the 2024 Romanian local elections, consists of 32 councilors, with the following party composition:

| Party | Seats | Current County Council |
|---|---|---|
| Social Democratic Party (PSD) | 19 | |
| National Liberal Party (PNL) | 10 | |
| Alliance for the Union of Romanians (AUR) | 3 | |

== Administrative divisions ==
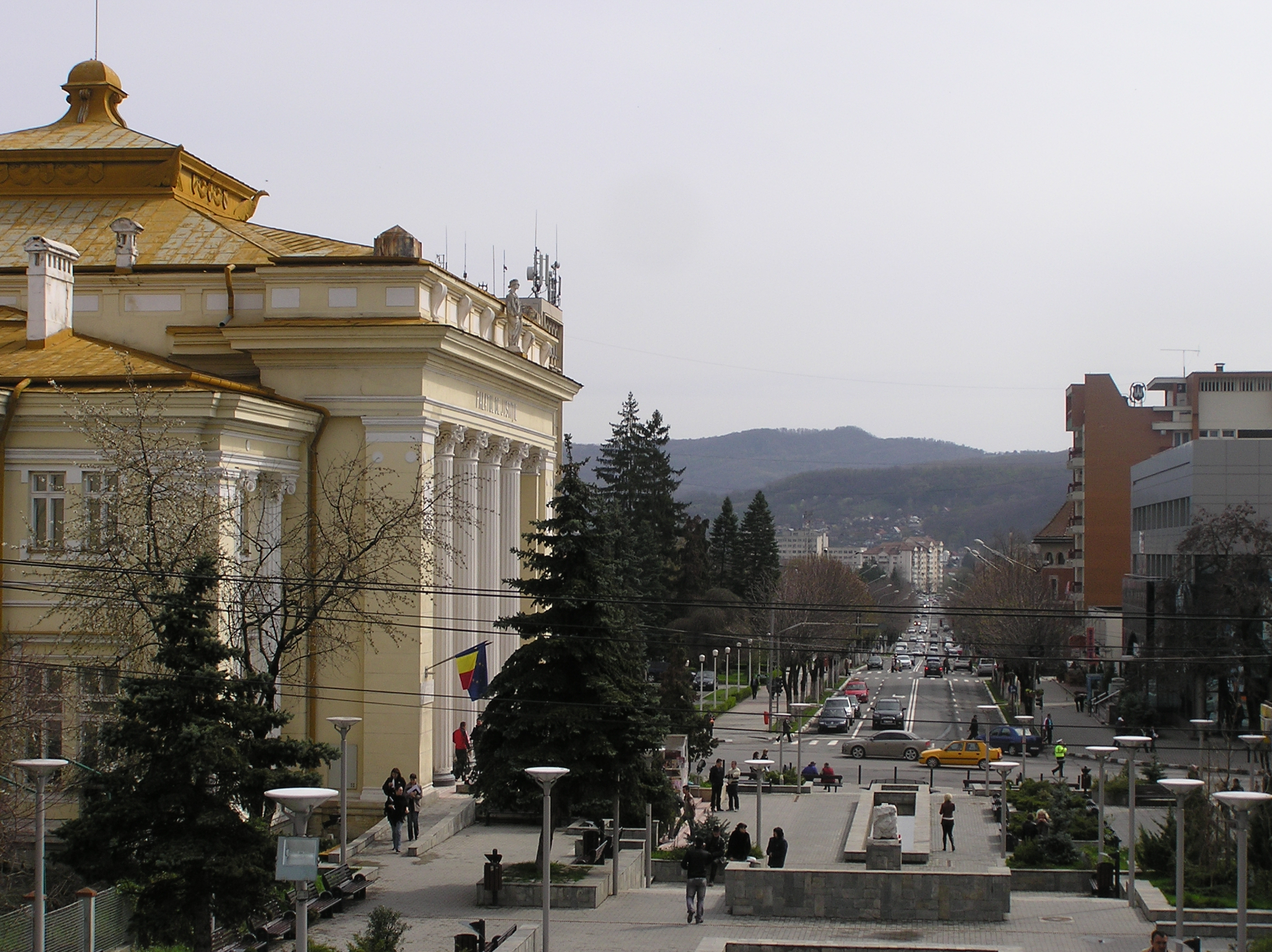
The Tudor Vladimirescu street in Râmnicu Vâlcea (early 2010)

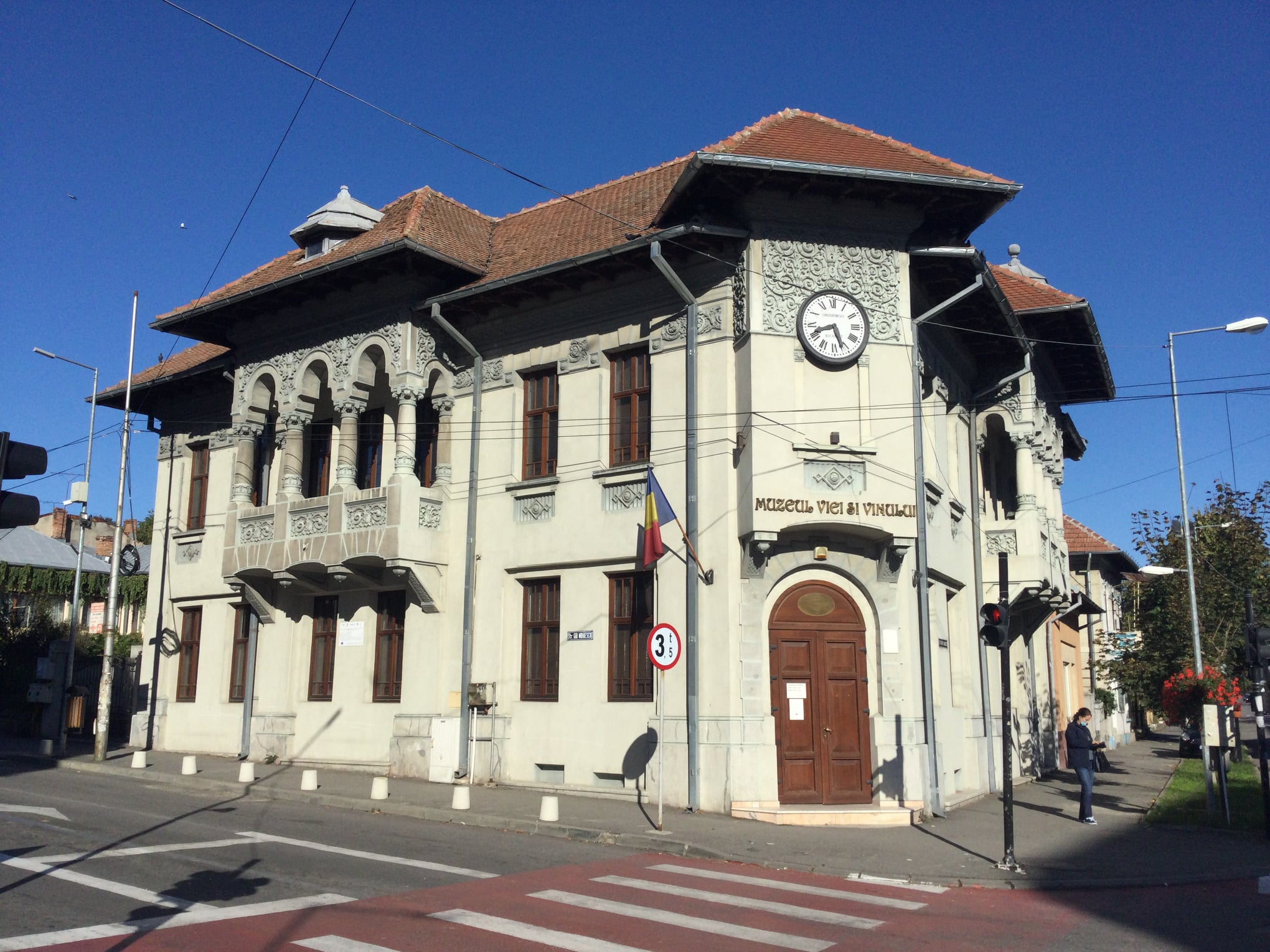
Drăgășani Wine Museum

Vâlcea County has two municipalities, nine towns and 78 communes as follows:

- Municipalities
  - Râmnicu Vâlcea - county seat town (Romanian: Oraș reședință de județ); population: 93,151 (as of 2022)
  - Drăgășani
- Towns
  - Băbeni
  - Băile Govora
  - Băile Olănești
  - Bălcești
  - Berbești
  - Brezoi
  - Călimănești
  - Horezu
  - Ocnele Mari
- Communes
  - Alunu
  - Amărăști
  - Bărbătești
  - Berislăvești
  - Boișoara
  - Budești
  - Bujoreni
  - Bunești
  - Câineni
  - Cernișoara
  - Copăceni
  - Costești
  - Crețeni
  - Dăești
  - Dănicei
  - Diculești
  - Drăgoești
  - Fârtățești
  - Făurești
  - Frâncești
  - Galicea
  - Ghioroiu
  - Glăvile
  - Golești
  - Grădiștea
  - Gușoeni
  - Ionești
  - Lăcusteni
  - Lădești
  - Laloșu
  - Lăpușata
  - Livezi
  - Lungești
  - Măciuca
  - Mădulari
  - Malaia
  - Măldărești
  - Mateești
  - Mihăești
  - Milcoiu
  - Mitrofani
  - Muereasca
  - Nicolae Bălcescu
  - Olanu
  - Orlești
  - Oteșani
  - Păușești
  - Păușești-Măglași
  - Perișani
  - Pesceana
  - Pietrari
  - Popești
  - Prundeni
  - Racovița
  - Roești
  - Roșiile
  - Runcu
  - Sălătrucel
  - Scundu
  - Sinești
  - Șirineasa
  - Slătioara
  - Stănești
  - Ștefănești
  - Stoenești
  - Stoilești
  - Stroești
  - Șușani
  - Sutești
  - Tetoiu
  - Titești
  - Tomșani
  - Vaideeni
  - Valea Mare
  - Vlădești
  - Voicești
  - Voineasa
  - Zătreni

== Historical county ==
Județul Vâlcea
- County (Județ)
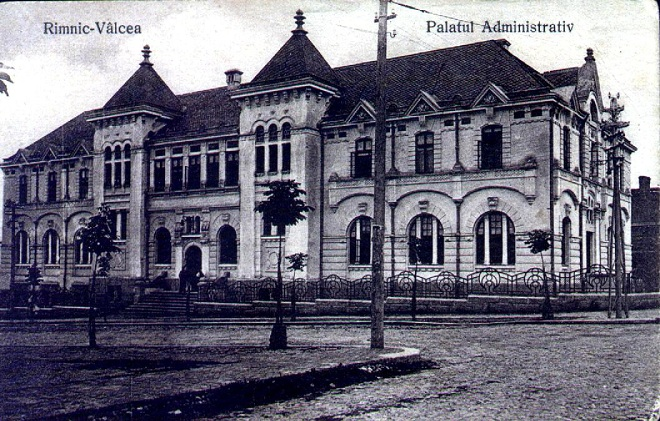
- The building of the Vâlcea County court from the interwar period, now the Râmnicu Vâlcea court.

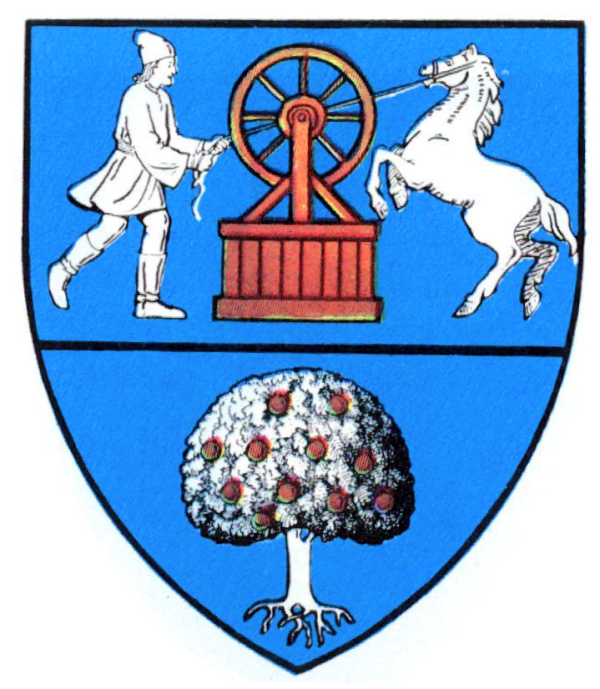
- Coat of arms

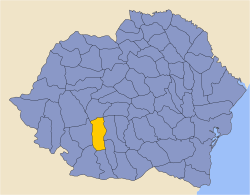
- Country: Romania
- Historic region: Oltenia
- Capital city (Reședință de județ): Râmnicu Vâlcea

Area
  - Total: 4,081 km^{2} (1,576 sq mi)

Population (1930)
  - Total: 246,659
  - Density: 60.44/km^{2} (156.5/sq mi)
- Time zone: UTC+2 (EET)
  - Summer (DST): UTC+3 (EEST)

Historically, the county was located in the southwestern part of Greater Romania, in the northeast part of the historical region of Oltenia. Its capital was Râmnicu Vâlcea. The interwar county territory comprised a large part of the current Vâlcea County; however the territories situated to the east of the Olt River in the current county were not part of the historical county.

The county was bordered to the north by Sibiu County, to the east by the counties of Argeș and Olt, to the south by Romanați County, and to the west by the counties of Dolj and Gorj.

=== Administration ===
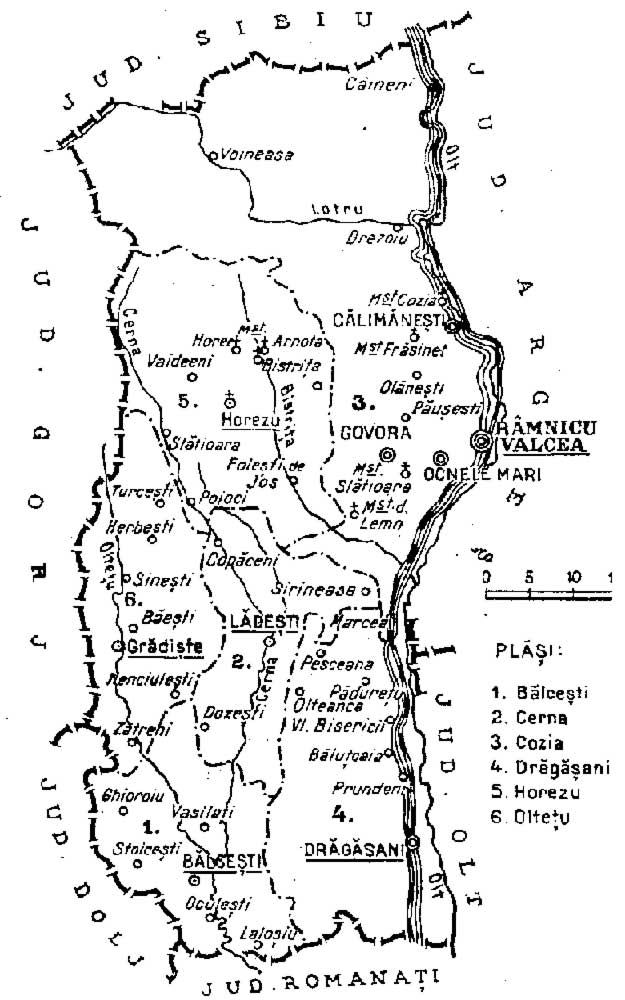
Map of Vâlcea County as constituted in 1938.

The county was in 1930 divided into five administrative districts (plăși):

1. Plasa Cerna, headquartered at Lădești
2. Plasa Cozia, headquartered at Călimănești
3. Plasa Drăgășani, headquartered at Drăgășani
4. Plasa Horezu, headquartered at Horezu
5. Plasa Zătreni, headquartered at Zătreni

By 1938, there were six districts, four previous and two new ones resulting from the reorganisation of the southwest part of the county:

1. Plasa Cerna, headquartered at Lădești
2. Plasa Cozia, headquartered at Călimănești
3. Plasa Drăgășani, headquartered at Drăgășani
4. Plasa Horezu, headquartered at Horezu
5. Plasa Bălcești, headquartered at Bălcești
6. Plasa Oltețu, headquartered at Oltețu

=== Population ===
According to the 1930 census data, the county population was 246,713 inhabitants, ethnically divided as follows: 97.4% Romanians, 1.6% Romanies, 0.2% Germans, 0.2% Hungarians, 0.2% Jews, as well as other minorities. From the religious point of view, the population was 99.0% Eastern Orthodox, 0.4% Roman Catholic, 0.2% Jewish, as well as other minorities.

==== Urban population ====
In 1930, the county's urban population was 31,909 inhabitants, comprising 94.8% Romanians, 1.3% Romanies, 1.0% Germans, 0.8% Jews, 0.7% Hungarians, as well as other minorities. From the religious point of view, the urban population was composed of 96.4% Eastern Orthodox, 1.4% Roman Catholic, 0.8% Jewish, 0.7% Lutheran, 0.3% Greek Catholic, as well as other minorities.
