= Malaia =

Malaia may refer to:

- Mălaia (river), in Vâlcea Romania
- Malaia, Vâlcea, Romania, a commune
- Malaia garnet, gemological varietal name of garnet

== See also ==
- Malaya (disambiguation)
- Malia (disambiguation)
