= Lotru-Ciunget Hydroelectric Power Station =

Lotru-Ciunget Dam
- Location within Romania
- Location: village Ciungetu; commune Mălaia
- Coordinates: 45.44721°N 23.76834°E
- Type: reservoir
- Primary inflows: Lotru
- Primary outflows: Lotru
- Basin countries: Romania
- Surface area: 12 km^{2} (4.6 sq mi)
- Water volume: 340 million cubic metres (280,000 acre⋅ft)

Lotru-Ciunget Dam and Hydro Power Plant is a large hydroelectric complex on the river Lotru situated in Romania and one of the biggest complex facilities in Europe. The complex consists of three hydroelectric power plants. The first and most productive one is Ciunget, the second one is Malaia and the third is Bradisor which, just as Ciunget, is an underground power plant.

The river which fills the dams is called Lotru. The first dam is called Vidra Lake and is one of the biggest artificial lakes in Romania. The dam supplies water to the Ciunget power plant via an 800-metre drop penstock. All the used water is recollected via an underground piping system and flows to the Malaia dam where is the second power plant. Malaia dam is a smaller dam and produces less electricity, mainly locally. From the second dam, the used water collects into the Bradisor dam. The Bradisor dam has a bigger capability of producing electricity than the Malaia dam and provides electricity to the Romanian national grid. Bradisor power plant is situated under a mountain in order to make the fall of water greater, thus more electricity.

The project was started in 1965, being fully finished only in 1982 and it was made up by the construction of a rockfill with a clay core dam 140 m high and an underground power plant equipped with three hydrounits, having an installed capacity of 510 MW. The Pelton type turbines operate under a net head of about 800 m. A 220 kV outdoor substation connects the plant to the Romanian electric grid.

The Ciunget hydro power plant entered revision and modernisation in 2007. This includes new generators to increase the electricity outflow. The modernisation period is expected to be finished in late 2010.

The power plant generates 1.15 TW·h (billion kW·h) of electricity per year.

== See also ==
- Porţile de Fier I
- Porţile de Fier II
