= Latorița =

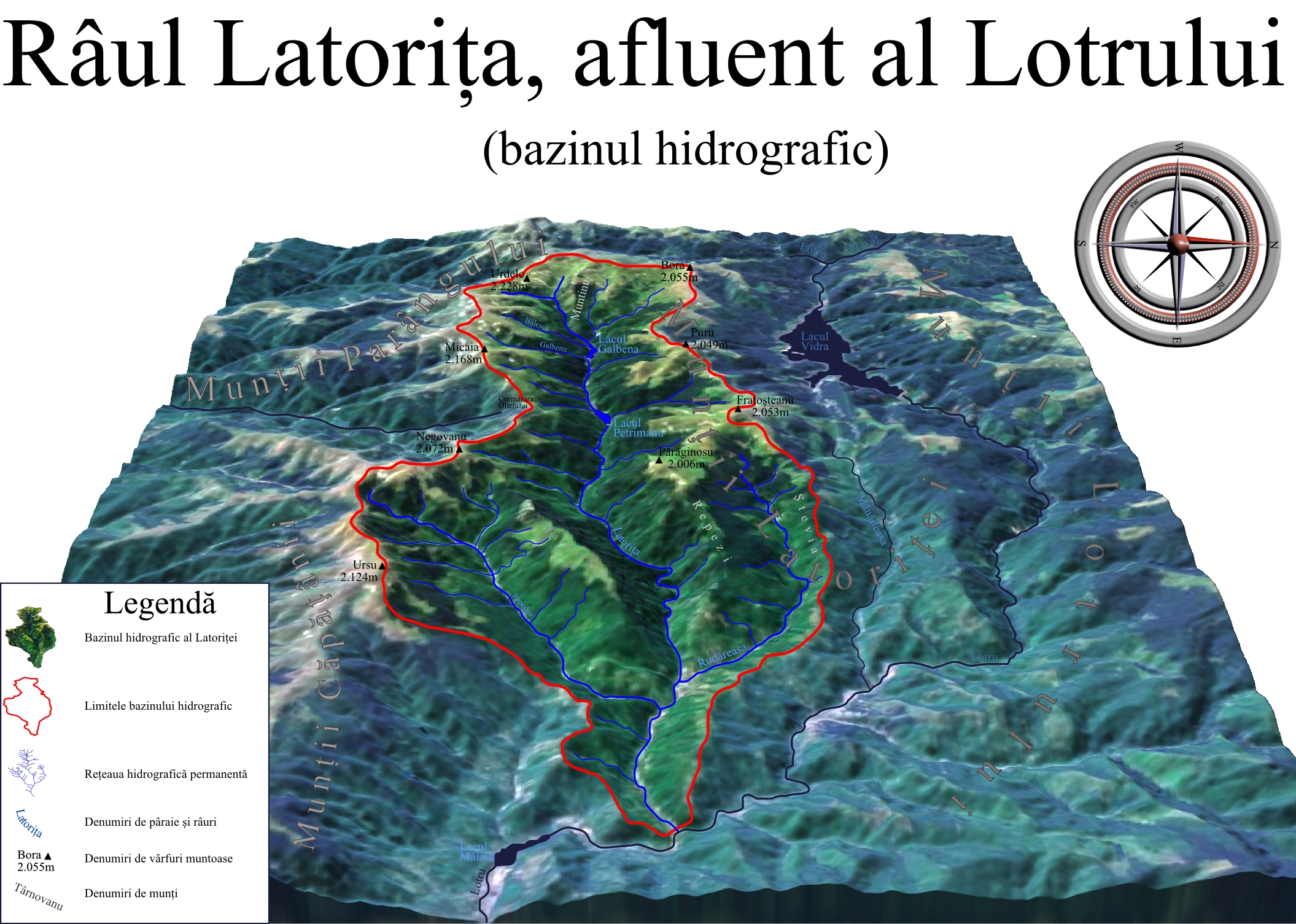
- Latorița drainage basin

- Location within Romania

Location
- Country: Romania
- Counties: Vâlcea County
- Villages: Ciungetu

Physical characteristics
- Mouth: Lotru
  - coordinates: 45.3843°N 24.0120°E
- Length: 32 km (20 mi)
- Basin size: 203 km^{2} (78 sq mi)

Basin features
- Progression: Lotru→ Olt→ Danube→ Black Sea
- Tributaries
  - left: Rudăreasa
  - right: Repedea

The Latorița is a right tributary of the river Lotru in south-central Romania. It feeds the reservoirs Galbenu and Petrimanu. The Latorița discharges into the Lotru near Valea Măceșului. Its length is 32 km (20 mi) and its basin size is 203 km^{2} (78 sq mi).

== Tributaries ==
The following rivers are tributaries to the river Latorița (from source to mouth):

- Left: Coasta Benghii, Zănoguța, Pârâul Șoimului, Petrimanu, Turcinul Mic, Turcinul Mare, Înșirata, Pârâul de sub Stâna Măricenilor, Lazul, Pârâul Feții, Pârâul Fagului, Rudăreasa, Mogani, Cireșu
- Right: Latorița de Mijloc (Muntenu), Latorița de Jos (Urdele), Galbenu, Izvorul Stânei, Igoiu, Pristos, Hoampa, Curmătura, Izvorul cu Hotar, Holuzu, Pârâul Crucii, Pârâul Răgăliei, Borogeana Mare, Pârâul lui Duminecă, Pârâul Adânc, Vătăielu, Repedea
