= Repedea (Latorița) =

- Location within Romania

Location
- Country: Romania
- Counties: Vâlcea County

Physical characteristics
- Source: Latorița Mountains
- Mouth: Latorița
  - coordinates: 45.3828°N 23.9624°E
- Length: 13 km (8.1 mi)
- Basin size: 42 km^{2} (16 sq mi)

Basin features
- Progression: Latorița→ Lotru→ Olt→ Danube→ Black Sea
- Tributaries
  - left: Pârâul Roșu
  - right: Funicel, Izvorul Mare

The Repedea (in its upper course also: Coșeana) is a right tributary of the river Latorița in Romania. It discharges into the Latorița near Ciungetu. Its length is 13 km (8.1 mi) and its basin size is 42 km^{2} (16 sq mi).
