= Stevia (disambiguation) =

Stevia is a sweetener and sugar substitute made from the leaves of the plant species Stevia rebaudiana.

Stevia may also refer to:

- Stevia rebaudiana, the plant species used for making stevia sweeteners
- Stevia (genus), the genus of about 240 species of herbs and shrubs that includes Stevia rebaudiana

== Rivers in Romania ==
- Ștevia River (Mânăileasa)
- Ștevia River (Azuga)
- Ștevia River (Rudăreasa)
- Ștevia River (Râușor)
