= List of dams and reservoirs in Romania =

This is a list of dams and reservoirs in Romania.

Name	Area (km^{2})	Capacity (mill. m^{3})	Dam height (m)	Impounded river	County
Cerna	1.7	124	110	Cerna	Gorj
Dracșani	5.0	6.1		Sitna	Botoșani
Drăgan	1.7	112	120	Drăgan	Cluj
Drăgănești	11.4	76	34	Olt	Olt
Fântânele	4.1	225	92	Someșul Cald	Cluj
Frunzaru	16.1	96	30	Olt	Olt
Golești	5.9	78.5	32	Argeș	Argeș
Gura Apelor	4.1	210	168	Râul Mare	Hunedoara
Gura Râului	0.3	17.5	74	Cibin	Sibiu
Ipotești	16.8	110	31	Olt	Olt
Iron Gate I	118.6	2,550	60	Danube	Mehedinți
Iron Gate II (Ostrovu Mare)	87.3	868	54	Danube	Mehedinți
Izbiceni	8	74	29	Olt	Olt
Izvorul Muntelui (Bicaz)	19.8	1,230	127	Bistrița	Neamț
Lugașu	4.6	65.4	29	Crișul Repede	Bihor
Măneciu	0.6	60	75	Teleajen	Prahova
Mihăilești	10.3	68	18	Argeș	Ilfov
Oașa	1.5	136	91	Sebeș	Alba
Paltinu	0.9	53.7	108	Doftana	Prahova
Pecineagu	1.8	63		Dâmbovița	Argeș
Poiana Mărului	0.6	96	125	Bistra Mărului	Caraș-Severin
Poiana Uzului	2.2	90	82	Uz	Bacău
Râușor	1.9	60		Râul Târgului	Argeș
Săcele	0.5	18.3	45	Tărlung	Brașov
Siriu	1.1	155	122	Buzău	Buzău
Stânca-Costești	41.3	1,290	43	Prut	Botoșani
Strejești	23.2	225	33	Olt	Olt
Șugag (Tău Bistra)	0.81	21	78	Sebeș	Alba
Tarnița	1.4	74	97	Someșul Cald	Cluj
Tileagd	5.2	52.9	37	Crișul Repede	Bihor
Vidra	4.6	340	121	Lotru	Vâlcea
Vidraru	5.3	469	166	Argeș	Argeș
Zetea	1	44	48	Târnava Mare	Harghita
