= Dionisie Eclesiarhul =

Wallachian monk and author (c. 1740–1820)

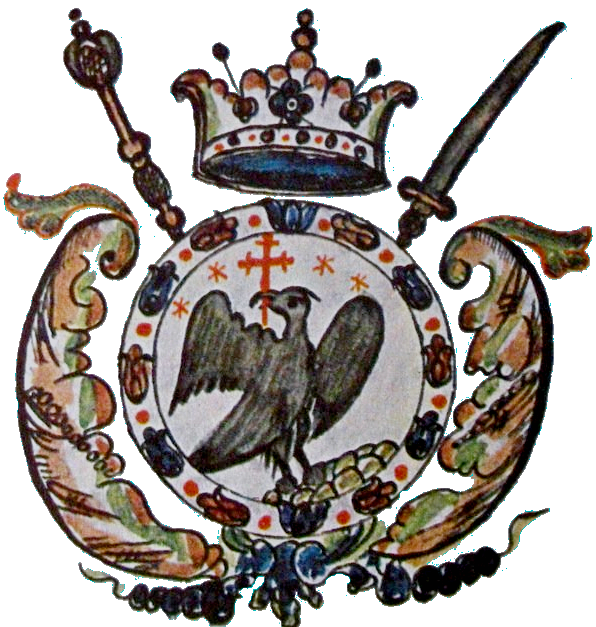
- Coat of arms of Wallachia, as depicted by Dionisie in 1795
- Born: Dumitru or Dimitrie c. 1740; Stoenești, Vâlcea County, Wallachia
- Died: c. 1820 (aged ≈80); Craiova?, Wallachia
- Occupations: Monk; scribe; calligrapher
- Writing career
- Period: c. 1770–1820
- Genres: Chronicle, biography, memoir

Dionisie Eclesiarhul, also spelled Ecleziarhul, Eclisiarchul, or Eclesiarcul ("the Ecclesiarch", born Dumitru or Dimitrie, also credited as Dionisie din Pietrari and Dionisie Cozăianul; c. 1740 – 1820), was a Wallachian monk, chronicler, and polemicist, also noted as a miniaturist and calligrapher. His life coincided with the Phanariote reigns, when a series of Wallachian Princes, generally Greeks, enforced Hellenization; Dionisie secretly resented this process, and rallied with a Wallachian conservative patriotism that bordered on Romanian nationalism. Wallachia was also a tributary state of the Ottoman Empire, which Dionisie viewed as a detestable overlord. A devout Eastern Orthodox (though he questioned the Ecumenical Patriarchate on political grounds), he spent his life in service to the Metropolis of Wallachia, which is now a component of the Romanian Orthodox Church. Lastly, he displayed a regional allegiance to Oltenia, which was then administered as a Great Banship under Wallachian supervision, and where he spent almost all his life.

After a short career as a married priest, Dionisie became a prolific scribe, finishing he Dobrușa beadroll in 1777. He was treasured by the Râmnic Archdiocese, where he served administrative functions while also becoming a highly skilled calligrapher in several languages. His historical writing is unusual for its context in that it relies heavily on first-hand experiences—one of the first such events is the Austro-Turkish War of 1788, during which Dionisie and his fellow monks were held as hostages in Craiova. The war also gave him what may have been his only experience of life outside Wallachia, namely an extended tour of Habsburg Hungary. Marginalized upon his return, he withdrew into regular monastic life, witnessing Oltenia's ruin, brought on by warlord Osman Pazvantoğlu—whom he depicted as a half-legendary figure—and the economic constraints introduced by the Napoleonic Wars. In his later chronicle, he depicts Napoleon as a negative figure, recording some of the rumors which circulated in respect to him; he also published translations of works dealing with Napoleon's eventual defeat.

After a brief return to favor and settlement in Bucharest, the Ecclesiarch was again expelled to Craiova, where he apparently spent the rest of his life, in 1814. It was here that he began writing his chronicle, known as Hronograful Țerei Românești, which also outlines his political vision—his critique of the Phanariotes, balanced by nuanced portrayals of individual princes such as Nicholas Mavrogenes, his contempt toward Westernization, and his appreciation for the Russian Empire. Though not generally seen as reliable on world events, he became a credited source for details on the Ottomans' abuse toward the boyar elite, and their humiliating execution of Prince Constantin Hangerli. His narrative is intertwined with naive accounts of the Kalmyks' alleged cannibalism, or his belief that the Russians had perfected poison gas. Some controversy endures about his work as a visual artist, since miniatures attributed to him are of varying quality—those which are certainly his are widely considered as the less accomplished ones, though sometimes commended for bridging canonical Byzantine and local naive art.

== Biography ==
=== Youthful experiences ===
Among the later reviewers of his work, Radu Constantinescu, Algeria Simota, Octav Păun and Marin Sorescu argued that Dionisie was born as "Dumitru" at Pietrari, Vâlcea County. Sorescu, alongside scholars such as Constantinescu and Lucian Boia, gave his birth year as 1759. Such information was rectified and amended by historians Dumitru Bălașa and Nicolae Stoicescu. As reported by them, Dionisie, known rather as "Dimitrie", was born at Stoenești, just northeast of Pietrari, "in or around 1740". He was also of confirmed "peasant origin", with Simota naming his father as Alexie and his mother (known to have served as a nun in later life) as Aspazia. Various records mention that he completed a primary-school education in Stoenești. He returned to his home village as a married priest; it was only after the death of his wife that he decided to take orders, possibly by entering Horezu Monastery. His earliest affiliation is subject to some disagreement: Simota indicates Tismana, while critic and historian Șerban Cioculescu argues for Cozia. According to Sorescu, during his training he was colleagues with Naum Râmniceanu, himself a future historian, with a similar take on world affairs.

Dionisie's life, mostly spent in the Wallachian subregion of Oltenia (the Great Banship), coincided with the mid-to-final stages of the Phanariote period. Wallachia and Moldavia, as the Romanian-inhabited Danubian Principalities, were governed by a Greek administrative class, which had also integrated with the local boyardom. Constantinescu notes that, in Dionisie's day, Phanariote dynasties had abandoned their early practice of regulating the "despotic system of taxation", and, beginning with Ștefan Racoviță's reign in the 1760s, were pushing for all-out spoliation. As summarized by historian Neagu Djuvara, this era saw the Princes (also known as hospodars) entirely committed to "obtain[ing] that which they desire[d] through lawlessness, preying, and villainy". The two countries were likewise tributary polities of the Ottoman Empire. Their sovereignty had been much reduced under the Phanariotes, who, in addition to displaying "a near-complete fidelity toward the Porte, down to 1774", also exposed their subjects to intense Hellenization. In that context, Dionisie the chronicler illustrated the "natural reactions against Greek influence".

The Russo-Turkish War of 1768 was a major event in Romanian history. It concluded in 1774 with the Treaty of Küçük Kaynarca, which signaled a decline of the Ottoman Empire, as well as "sweeping contacts with the West and with Russia" for both Principalities. Dionisie was by then foremost active as a scribe, whose earliest works of note include a beadroll (pomelnic) of the monastery in Dobrușa, finished in 1777. As noted in his later chronicle, this period was one of "terrible oppression" under the Ottomans, who went as far as to publicly humiliate the boyars and their retinues. Also evidencing himself as a calligrapher and archivist, widely seen as very intellectually gifted, Dionisie climbed rather quickly through the religious hierarchy, from Hieromonk to Ecclesiarch of the Râmnic Archdiocese. Its Bishop, Filaret, may have retained him as a favorite in 1786.

The future chronicler became educated by 18th-century standards. Sorescu describes Dionisie's "wonderful lettering" in Romanian Cyrillic, Church Slavonic, as well as Latin; the same author takes this to mean that Eclesiarhul was a polyglot, in addition to being exceptionally versed in the canons of Orthodoxy. Dionisie, who once detailed his efforts in rendering Slavonic documents (calling the language sârbie, "Serbian"), was also familiar with Russian, and, at an unknown date, translated into Romanian a tract called Stavrofilia, as Calea împărătească a crucii Domnului. Păun suggests that he could understand not just Slavonic and Russian, but also Ottoman Turkish. Literary historian Tudor Nedelcea similarly notes that Dionisie could speak several languages, and also that he seemed to have grasped geography (including topography) and arithmetic. Boia challenges such accounts, noting that Dionisie had a "modest culture" to match his social origin, whereas Naum's was "evidently superior". Constantinescu likewise argues that Dionisie "was not a man of high learning". Despite numerous opportunities to improve himself, he is only known to have read some four works of theology and at least one chronicle.

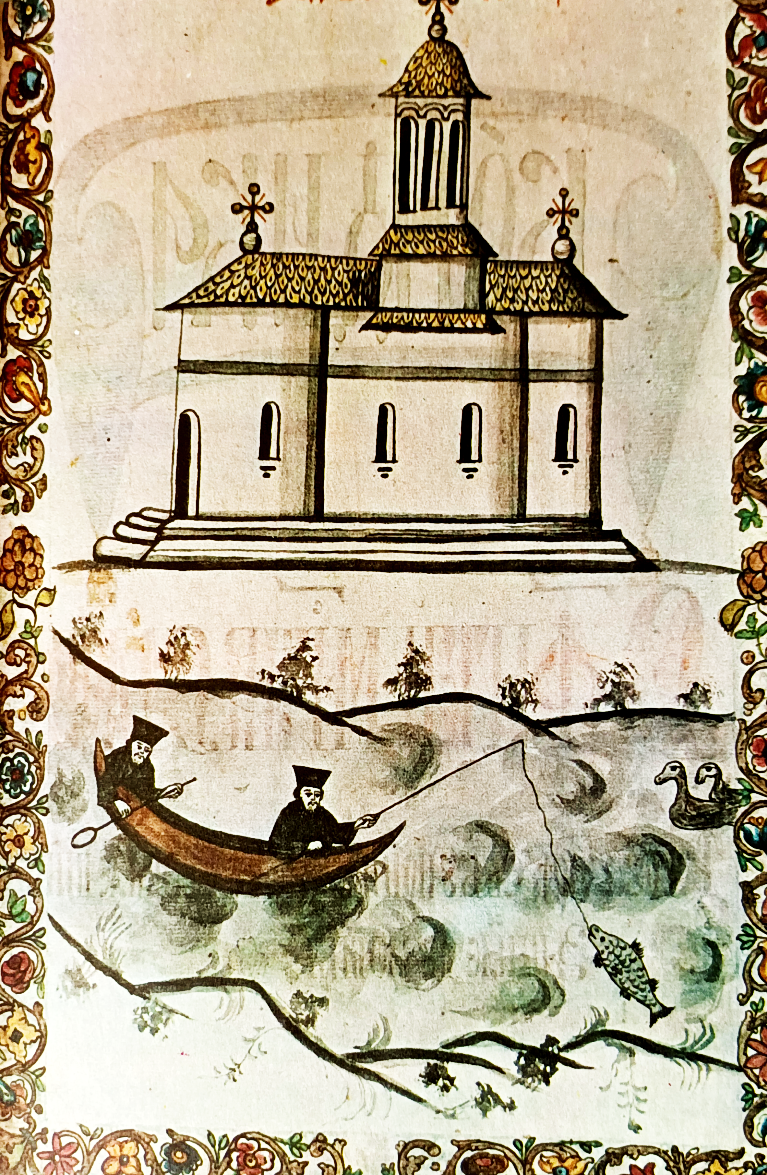
Monks of Sadova fishing, in a 1792 illustration attributed to Dionisie

In 1786, Dionisie penned a three-volume register of the Bishopric. Some clues about his debut as a historian are found in his account of the Austro-Turkish War of 1788, which includes "strategic details, portraits of commanders, and troop movements", discussing at length the occupation of Craiova and Bucharest (respectively, Oltenia and Wallachia's capitals) by the Imperial Army of the Habsburg monarchy, ending in decimation by an outbreak of typhoid fever. His status as an eyewitness is specified further in another fragment of a monastery register, dated to November 1788. Here, he clarifies that he was a captive in Craiova, alongside the other monks, being closely watched by the cumpliți volontiri nemțești ("terrifying German volunteers"); he also reports learning from a Logothete's aide in Bucharest that soldiers of the Habsburg and Imperial Russian armies, who together occupied the city, were engaged in raucous fistfights which entertained the Wallachians. In 1789, Dionisie was a refugee in the Transylvania and Habsburg Hungary, leaving an account of his travels there. According to Păun, he shared this temporary home with Naum. This is partly contradicted by Boia, who notes that Naum went there as a prisoner, whereas Dionisie was part of Metropolitan Filaret's formal retinue, possibly stationed in Buda. Simota believes that Filaret took both his monks with him, passing through Petrovaradin. The detail about Buda, she notes, can be traced to Dionisie's description of the Királyi Vár.

=== Marginalization and retirement ===
Dionisie returned to Râmnicu Vâlcea at some point in or before 1791, when the Treaty of Sistova was brokered, and proceeded to copy a register for the monastic community in Strehaia. He was probably escaping the plague epidemic, which took him to Strehaia, Sadova (in 1792), Jitianu (1793), and Drăgășani (1794). It also appears that he then fell out of favor with Filaret's successors, which is why he had to renounce his position at the Archdiocese. He returned to regular monastic life, passing through Bistrița, Govora, and finally Arnota. The dates of his stay at either monastery are unclear, though he is believed to have been residing at Bistrița, where his work was supervised by Logothete Răducan sin Dumitrache, in 1795. That year appears in his manuscript copy of the monastery register, under miniatures showing the church, icons of The Virgin Mary and Gregory of Dekapolis, and a portrait of Archimandrite Nectarie. Constantinescu believes that it was only in the early 1790s that Dionisie trained as a watercolorist (zugrav de subțire), being directly supervised by Ioan Zugrav and, possibly, by Manea Zugrav as well.

Also in 1795, Dionisie wrote down his Romanian translation of a 17th-century Slavonic writ by Prince Radu Mihnea, which is also a social document regarding the nature of serfdom in Wallachia. The scribe elicited some controversy for suggesting that the serfs had been "bound to the land" by order of an earlier ruler, Michael the Brave. While his translation was used as a main source of information by modern historians beginning with Nicolae Bălcescu, it is criticized as inaccurate by Constantin C. Giurescu, who believes that the incriminated words were not present in the Mihnea original (but rather added by Dionisie). At some point before 1796, he copied and translated Slavonic diplomas from the Tismana archives, attributed to Sigismund of Luxemburg, Holy Roman Emperor (whom he knew as Zicmond) and John Hunyadi (Ianoș). Unbeknown to him, these were forgeries prepared by the local monks to protect their rights during the fist Habsburg occupation of Oltenia (c. 1730). By 1799, Dionisie was known to be working on another register, for the monks of Titireciul, in Ocnele Mari. He became a ktitor (founder) of skete in Mănăilești, Vâlcea, and was depicted as such in its murals, done in 1801 by Dinu of Craiova.

In Dionisie's main historical narrative, Hronograful Țerei Românești, wartime episodes are followed by his bemoaning of Oltenia's devastation by the Ottoman warlord Osman Pazvantoğlu, which had taken place in and around 1802; the story contains outstanding detail, from things Dionisie describes as "written down in my heart". He witnessed the invasion's effects from Bistrița, which was visited by Oltenian civilians who had been disfigured by the Ottoman intervention force (and were wrongly recorded as Pazvantoğlu's victims). Sorescu reads a "hint of admiration" for Pazvantoğlu's legalism and audacity, but also "dark skepticism" regarding the region's prospects for recovery. Dionisie also provides direct references to the Napoleonic Wars and their dire consequences for economic life in Wallachia; his texts show that he detested and resented Napoleon.

Dionisie appears to have been living in Craiova during February 1804, when he was commissioned as a calligrapher by the monks of Arnota and Urșani. His career peaked again later that year, when he returned as Ecclasiarch of the Metropolis in Bucharest, where he also served as a and teacher of Slavonic. This made him a personal witness to the September fire, which destroyed much of Bucharest, and which, Dionisie claimed, had been the fault of a careless downtown apothecary. He was also in town for the Russian invasion of 1806, noting that he had "seen with my own eyes" how the Russian troops took relish in collecting the heads of Ottoman captives, which they then put up on public display. He himself lived on Dealul Mitropoliei, and, assigned to the Cotroceni Monastery, also spent time on the northern estate, Ferestreu. In September 1809, he purchased from the market of Gorgani a copy of Dimitrie Cantemir's Divanul, adding an autograph in Greek lettering. He calls himself Dionisie Cozăianul, highlighting his intimate connection with Cozia.

=== Old age ===
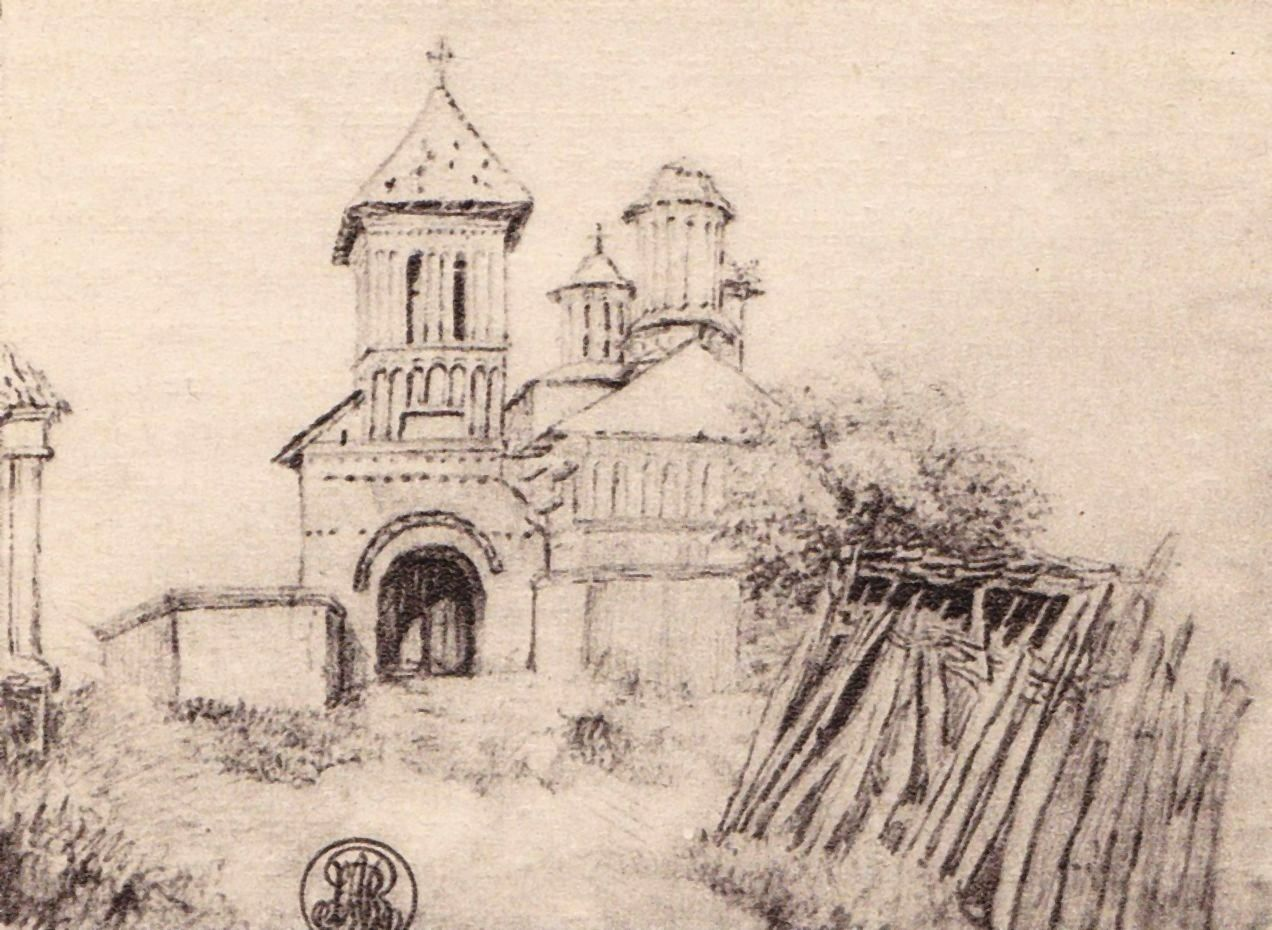
The old Church of Saint Demetrius in Craiova, as drawn in 1847 by Barbu Iscovescu

Dionisie appears to have been sacked in 1811 or 1813, and again had to settle in Craiova. He managed to survive the epidemic known as Caragea's plague, which, according to his own first-account, saw the city's devastation and a massive flight of its population. His political ideas and lifetime lessons were conflated in Hronograful Țerei Românești, which he began writing at Craiova in 1814; its date of completion is unknown, given as 1815 by Simota and Sorescu, as 1818 by Constantinescu, and as 1820 by Nedelcea. The manuscript narrates events going back to 1764—taking some liberties from the established canon, in that all topics are from the author's lifetime (a "terrible era", according to Sorescu). It picks up the narrative thread from where it had been left off by a more obscure writer, the Stolnic Dumitrache (Răducan's father), and makes ample note of the 1768 Russian invasion. The final parts are direct accounts of unfolding events, including those of January 1815, when Receb Ağa and his rebels of Ada Kaleh ransacked Craiova, while rogue Pandurs acted as warlords in other parts of Oltenia. Also included are minute accounts of very recent international events, such as the Hundred Days, with a complete translation of Tsar Alexander's demands from the people of Paris.

Hronograful itself suggests that such information came to Wallachia by means of gazettes and biographies, avidly sought after by boyars such as Barbu C. Știrbei; Constantinescu writes that the Ecclesiarch was himself a follower of the press, which he mostly read through digests published in Buda. According to researchers Cornelia Papacostea-Danielopolu and Lidia Demény, it is an established fact that both Dionisie and Naum compiled news picked up from Efimeris and other newspapers of the Modern Greek Enlightenment, arriving in the Austrian Empire. Simota similarly believes that his views were shaped by "minor works of anti-French propaganda", imported from the West; around that time, he translated from German an account of the French campaign in Russia, and another one dealing with the Battle of Waterloo (both were published at Buda, in 1814 and 1815, respectively).

Dionisie continued with his work as a scribe—around 1813, he finished the register of Bucovăț Monastery, which ended up at Varlaam on Meteora; this was followed by beadrolls for the priest in Craiova's Șimnicu de Jos community (1814) and the monks of Țânțăreni (1816), between which he penned a deed to the estate of Sutești (1815). In another such manuscript, penned in 1816 for his colleagues at Govora, he condenses additional biographical detail. He had come to live exclusively from his craft, leaving complaints about his declining eyesight and dexterity, as well as about his chest being "hurt from within". His quill was now a "venomous snake" (șarpe veninat), who left him with debilitating cramps. His income dwindling, he now accepted commissions from civilian entities, such as a fragment of Constantine Harmenopoulos' Hexabiblos, done for Captain Constantin Zătreanu in 1817. During 1819, under contract with Paharnic Constantin Almăjan, he calligraphed a genealogy of the Poenaru-Almăjanu burghers. Before July of the following year, he was fulfilling a commission for the register of Obedeanu Monastery, but complained about not being able to finish work without hiring an apprentice. According to Constantinescu, his claim of having been reduced to poverty was facetious, not least of all because of his donating 682 thaler for the painters of Bucovăț.

From Sadova, Dionisie wrote to Prince Alexandros Soutzos, pleading to have his pay supplemented. He was directed to seek help among the monks of Jitianu, but refused to move there; he was instead sponsored by Jitianu, Bucăvăț, and two other monasteries, with a monthly stipend of 30 thaler. In all, he had completed "30 documentary chronicles, 22 beadrolls for ktitors, two books of ritual, other manuscripts and translations. [...] he was also a bookbinder, typographer, engraver and miniaturist, a portraitist." Giurescu believes that, as a scribe, he was responsible for penning "thousands of property deeds". Two competing oral traditions, recorded in 1985 by art historian Paul Rezeanu, suggest that Dionisie spent his final years either at Gănescu Monastery (on the spot later occupied by the University of Craiova) or in a hut located at Brândușa Church. The monk died in poverty, "probably in 1820", though Constantinescu and his fellow art expert Mariana Șenilă-Vasiliu both propose 1821, coincidentally the date of a large-scale anti-Phanariote uprising in Oltenia.

== Literary work and ideology ==
=== Generic traits ===
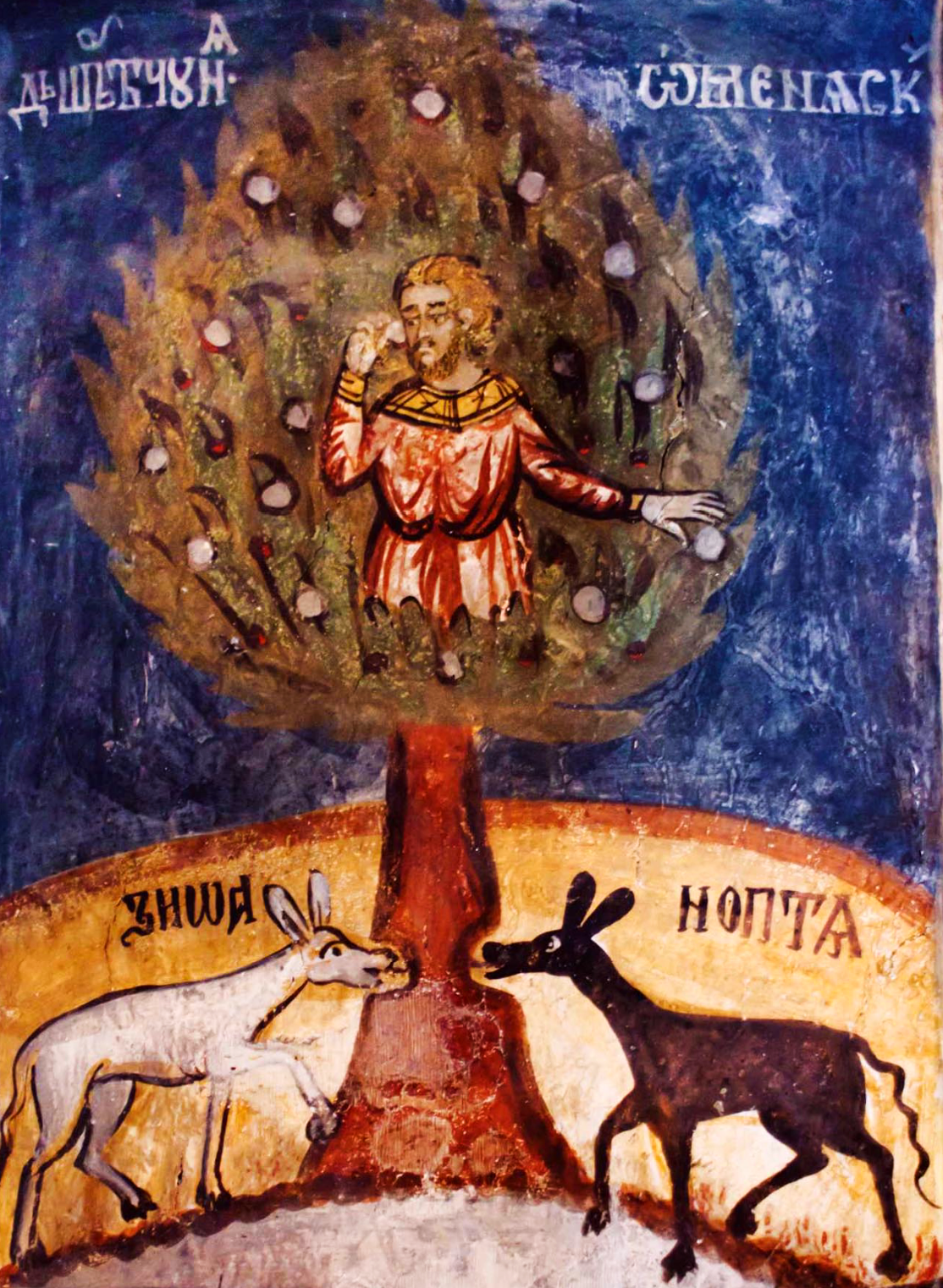
Personification of "human folly" in an 1828 mural from Piscu Mare, Vâlcea (done by the local masters Ilie of Teiuș and Constantin of Zmeuret). Man clinging on to a fruit tree which is gnawed at by a black and a white donkey, respectively representing Night and Day

Despite his ambitions as a professional historian, Dionisie is "the last medieval-school chronicler", and primarily seen as a contributor to Romanian literature. His main work, "in equal parts a chronicle and a memoir", "features good, novella-style pages, with hints of the Italian or Spanish short prose, with comedic or violent episodes". Writing in 1976, Boia saw Hronograful as "perhaps the only historical work of its day that one can read today not just with interest, but also with pleasure." Simota also recognized the monk's "storytelling skills" and "charming orality", though, she notes, he is inferior to the more ancient Ioan Neculce in his grasp of human psychology. Unintentionally so, Dionisie's narrative is also a document attesting to the evolution of written Romanian, admired by Sorescu for its "old-language charms". Praised for his "natural language", which generally discards the stereotypical conventions of earlier chroniclers, Dionisie allows the least pretentious register of Romanian to penetrate into literary culture. His version of the vernacular predates the re-latinization campaign, allowing historian Djuvara to propose that his language in 1815 is as different from Constantin Negruzzi's in 1840 as Philippe de Commines' Middle French is from the language of Prosper Mérimée. This layer of the Romanian lexis features expressions that have since been relegated to obscurity, in particular those belonging to the traditionally under-recorded Oltenian dialect (such as murea de se stingea, "[he or she] died to extinction"); they appear alongside the first instances of Western words adapted to Romanian (as in siclet for "secret" and feldmașar for "field marshal"), which coexist with a large array of borrowings from Turkish (such as nazâr, meidan, and serascher).

Overall, the Ecclesiarch and his friend Naum were bitterly opposed to the Phanariotes—sharing this trait with a fellow Wallachian writer, Zilot Românul, and with a Moldavian, Alecu Beldiman. As historian Vlad Georgescu notes, "the easy-going Dionisie loses his temper" when he has to describe spoliation by the other Greek institutions—including the Ecumenical Patriarchate. Sometimes, this hostility unexpectedly subsided: his narrative opens with the reign of Alexander Ypsilantis, whom he describes as a "judicious, high-minded prince" (domn înțelept și cu minte înaltă). Replicating a generally positive view of the monarch, found in both local histories and foreigners' accounts, he only reserves scorn for Ypsilantis-appointed judges, who "stretch the law to get their money." Historian Paul Cernovodeanu also reports that Eclesiarhul's account of Nicholas Mavrogenes, who was famously despotic and "megalomaniac" (and whose 1780s reign marked a "crisis of the Phanariote regime"), remained generally neutral, alternating condemnation and praise. As read by historian George Ionescu-Gion, Dionisie seems genuinely impressed by Mavrogenes' efforts to reestablish the Wallachian military forces. When he chides the Prince, it is generally for his fanatical approach to church affairs: according to Dionisie, Mavrogenes forced Christians to attend all sermons, or risk being whipped into submission by his guards—să umplea besericile de oameni de frica poruncii, iar nu pentru dragostea lui Dumnezeu ("churches would fill up for fear of punishment, and not for the love of God").

As read by Nedelcea, Dionisie was a patriot and a populist, who sympathized primarily with the peasants; Păun adds that: "In describing this and that reign, he almost always resorts to arguments of an economic kind." Dwelling on the more predatory aspects of Mavrogenes' rule, he recounts Caimacam Ioniță Papuc's habit of arresting "people he knew to have money". They were then forced into the boyardom, and as such overtaxed. Among the literary scholars, Alexandru Dima dismissed Dionisie and Zilot as "backward consciousnesses", since they also rejected the Age of Enlightenment and its small manifestations in Wallachia; Simota suggests that the Transylvanian School, already flourishing in Dionisie's lifetime, had developed a more modernized perspective on Romanian history. His take on the French Revolution was overall confusing, as he tried to understand the core issue in Wallachian terms: Dionisie presented the French nobility (whom he called "boyars") as the revolutionary agents, and their movement as a restoration, since, as he puts it, King Louis XVI "had tried to demean France's traditions and instruments of rule" (au căutat să strice obiceaiurile [sic] și stăpânirile Franței). Sorescu notes Dionisie's extreme traditionalism, which refused to align itself with the Enlightenment's "science of history", and which had its implicit merits.

=== Candor and determinism ===
Economist Gheorghe Zane includes Dionisie on a list of Phanariote-era Romanians or assimilated Greeks (variously including Constantin Caracaș, Dionisie Fotino, Dinicu Golescu, Michael Soutzos, Ionică Tăutu, Alexandru Vilara, and Ienăchiță Văcărescu) who were increasingly aware of "the Romanian people's backwardness as compared to other peoples", producing "extremely harsh criticism of the present-day situations [they encountered]." According to Sorescu, the Ecclesiarch's search for an alternative to Westernization meant an embrace of the Balkans, an altogether "more refined spirituality"; in this, he prefigured Wallachians such as Anton Pann, Ion Luca Caragiale, and Mateiu Caragiale. "Balkanism" was also a generic trend, since Eclesiarhul's time marked the "peak of Orientalization" in Romanian culture. Dionisie was still primarily anti-Turkish, "rejoic[ing] in Russian victories, which diminished the power held by the Porte", and overall "denounc[ing] the Ottoman yoke as a danger for his country's stability." In his 1874 overview of Phanariote-era chronicles, essayist George Panu expresses bewilderment at Dionisie's readiness to credit the Russians with mystical attributes, a sample of "the darkness under which we were living at the time"—Hronograful credits a legend according to which the Imperial Russian Army had used poison gas, acquired from "Hindia", against the Ottomans.

Ionescu-Gion notes that neither Dionisie, nor any of the "boyars and those who wrote the chronicles", had a clear understanding of the Eastern question, or of the risks posed by Russian imperialism. The Phanariotes, on the other hand, were astute diplomats, who also "opened the Turks' eyes" on this issue. In some contexts, the Ecclesiarch expresses some apprehension about Russian intrusions. His coverage of a Russian occupation in 1812 reports rumors from Bucharest that the Kalmyks, arriving in as Russian auxiliaries, were cannibals who turned fallen bodies into pastrami and hunted Jewish children for food. Some fragments of Hronograful display Dionisie's interest for the First Serbian Uprising, and especially for Prince Constantine Ypsilantis' attempt to assist the rebels (in what was a staged effort to ensure Wallachia's own emancipation from the Porte).

Historian Nicolae Iorga was persuaded that Dionisie was relatively incompetent: "He's only good as a storyteller: the things he has seen, the things other informed him about, the things he read. Everything is naive and pleasurable precisely because of its naivete". This view, also taken up by Cioculescu ("[Dionisie is] a Douanier Rousseau-like figure in our historiography") and by scholar Ion C. Chițimia (who admires the monk simply for his talent and "candor"), was contested by literary critic Mihai Ungheanu. As noted by Ungheanu, Eclesiarhul only appears as gauche if reading is confined to his antiquated language: "Transcribed into European, neologistic, formulas, the monk of Râmnic no longer seems at all naive, indicating to us that the paste of one's vocabulary can prevent or delay access to one's idea, in any given text." Iorga's verdict is also partly challenged by Sorescu. According to him, Hronograful provides some insight into Dionisie's take on world politics, which sometimes evidences the role of personalities—Dionisie argues that Leopold, Holy Roman Emperor, had a peaceful disposition and "enough countries" to rule upon; he also believes that the similarly unwarlike Grand Duke Konstantin Pavlovich was a major factor in appeasing Napoleon. In depicting the latter's ascent and creation of the First French Empire, he produces a number of chronological and biographical errors—such as when informing his readers that Napoleon was a Roman Greek (grec romeos). Dionisie also genuinely believed that Louis XVII had survived the Revolution and made his way into Russia, and had a vague idea about the Egyptian campaign as securing a trade route—"leading into faraway lands, perhaps to America."

Hronograful pioneers comparative history and determinism by closely monitoring events occurring in the Ottoman Empire, and throughout Europe—as noted by Nedelcea, he was not alone in his "European vision", which was by then a "healthy Romanian tradition" in history-writing. On this observational basis, Dionisie embraces fatalism, concluding that Wallachia's fate was always decided outside her territory and control. Overall: "He turns into literature, one that is well-tensioned and well-structured, a vast subject matter, generally collected not from books, from chronicles, from registers, but from oral tradition and from things seen with his own eyes. He had clear eyes, which also knew how to fill themselves with apparitions. Fantastic data are called upon to better interlard things unknown to him." Boia suggests that Dionisie is not a reliable source, especially not on the French Revolution and Napoleonic Wars (where he reaches "peak absurdity"), but finds value in the implicit aspects: "[Hronograful] is an extremely precious psychological and historical document, perhaps unique in our literature. [...] Eclesiarhul recounts everyday life, history itself, as perceived by the common folk. Whenever he tries to lift himself above his sphere of activity, the author veers into the realm of fantasy, facing readers with a spectacle that resembles Oriental fairy tales." Dionisie's inability to distinguish fact from fantasy appears in his short biography of Pazvantoğlu: Păun highlights its overall gullibility, noting that it resembles the One Thousand and One Nights.

Dionisie's description of some rules is short and ambiguous, with focus on ceremonial aspects; one example is his dismissive retelling of Alexandros Soutzos' first reign (though this is also accompanied by a note which expresses some admiration for Soutzos as an old, and therefore more competent or less destructive, Phanariote). Dionisie declares himself perplexed by another Phanariote, Alexander Mourouzis, whom he describes as an incompetent administrator, strecurând țânțariul și înghițind cămila ("sieving out mosquitoes and gulping camels", as in: "penny-wise and pound-foolish"). The chronicle dwells on the reign of Constantine Hangerli—according to Sorescu, this is the most accomplished portion of Dionisie's entire work. Dionisie questions Hangerli's war on Pazvantoğlu, since it provided a pretext for fiscal excesses. Arnauts acting for the Prince would terrorize the locals, "like hungry wolves", while the church and its "poor priests" were especially insulted. The chapter includes an episode of national humiliation, in which Hangerli dresses up muieri podărese, curve și cârciumărese ("female prostitutes, whores and barmaids"), presenting them as boyaresses and encouraging Ottoman soldiers to have sex with them. This portion of the text is closely followed by catastrophe: Ottoman Sultan Selim III decides to simply discard Hangerli, and, in another embarrassing episode, has the Kapucu execute him and desecrate his body in front of his entire court.

== Visual artist ==
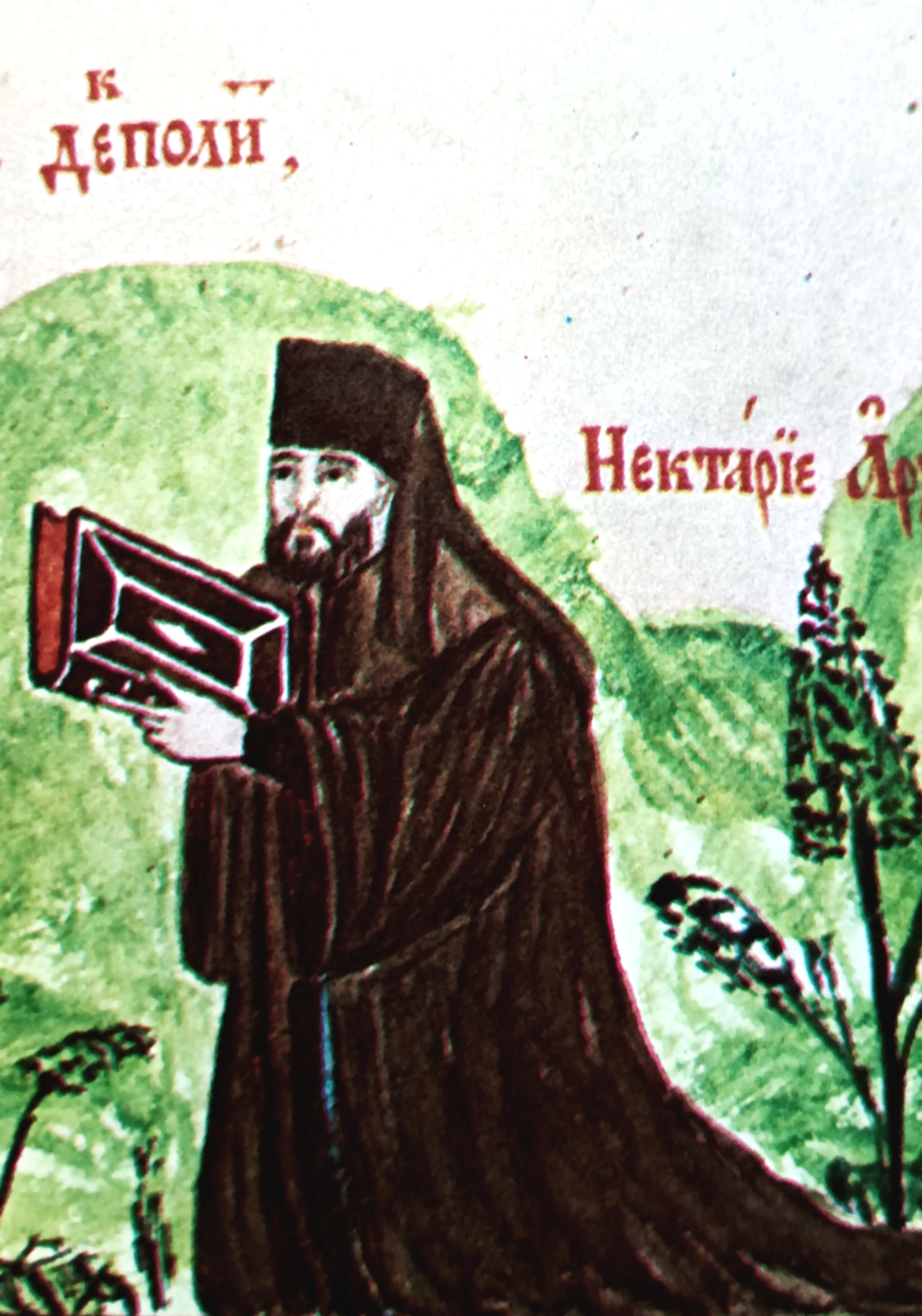
Portrait of Bistrița Monastery's Hegumen Nectarie, 1796

Flower with the princely title Iѡ (Io) in the Govora Monastery register, 1797

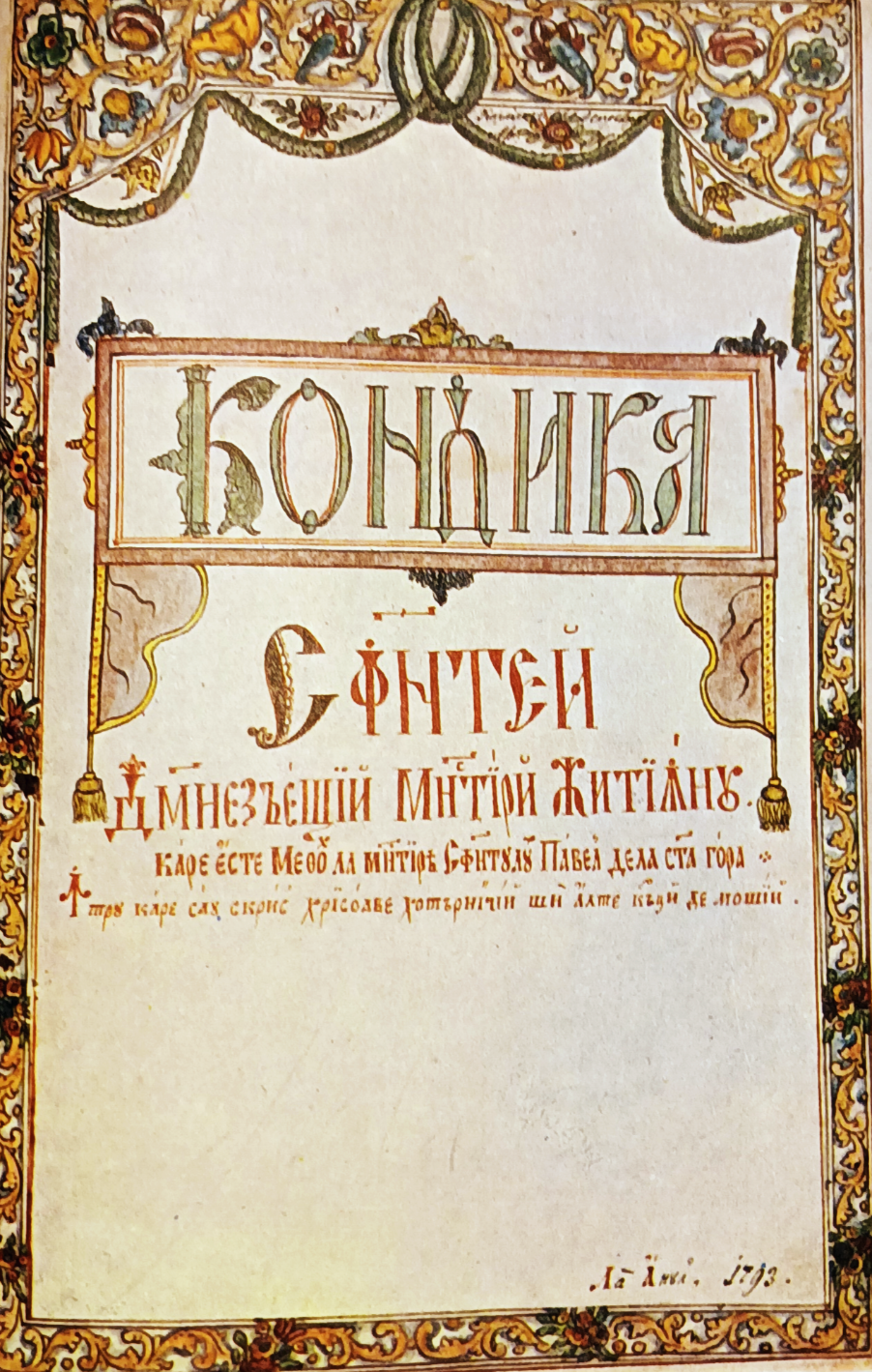
Title page of the Jitianu register, completed by Dionisie in 1808

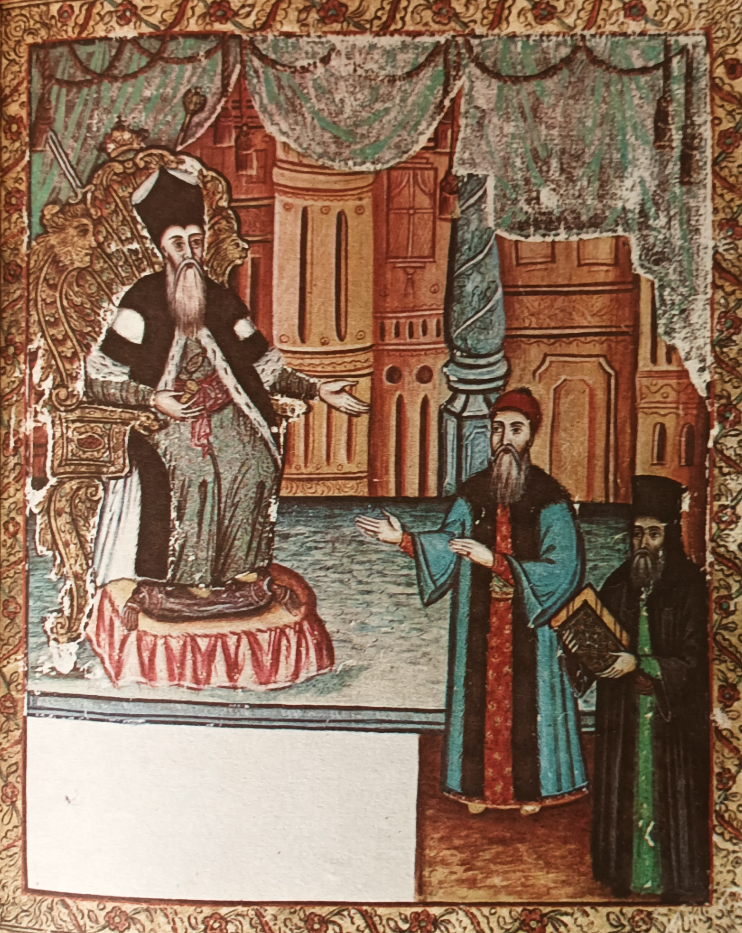
John Caradja on his throne in the Cotroceni Monastery chronicle of 1817 (miniature controversially attributed to Dionisie)

Constantinescu explained the Ecclesiarch's work as a miniaturist as the last "true and complete" manifestation of Byzantine art in a Romanian context—"evidently, copies of Byzantine models and types have been done in later times, and are even done to this day, but they endure as an unoriginal mirroring of long-held canons; all this while Dionisie the Ecclesiarch draws things as he knows them, as he sees them, not by slavishly copying some other man's work in painting." The same expert proposes that at least part of the monk's Byzantine conservatism was forced on him at Bistrița, an alternative seat of the regional bishopric. A special order was issued here in 1781, informing churches that they needed to follow guidelines set by Dionysios of Fourna in matters of icon-painting. Initially embracing observation from life, Dionisie showed a complete disregard for perspective in his old-age drawings—possibly because Dionysios had ordered it.

Constantinescu also posits that, while Wallachian art in the Phanariote century had tied itself to the "Balkan and oriental realm", Dionisie's was still "rustic and nonconformist", drawing much of its inspiration from the "universe of the village"; some of his paintings show Vâlcea as it was back then, with its "green flames" of fir-tree and spruce, with the "shabby appearances of country homes and churches." Constantinescu highlights the same "rustic" quality in the three ink-and-watercolor landscapes that survive to this day (one of which is a rudimentary bird's-eye view of the Bucegi Mountains). Bibliologist Gheorghe Buluță sees Eclesiarhul's figurative work as embodying "the last-stage miniature", when the peasants' naive art embraced some conventions from European painting, while also renouncing the "opulence" of earlier Brâncovenesc art. Buluță therefore includes Dionisie in the a category of amateur illustrators from across the Romanian-speaking area, variously including Năstase Negrule, Picu Pătruț, and Sava Popovici-Barcianu. The clash of vision with Brâncovenesc traditionalism is also discussed by art historian Tereza Sinigalia. She sees Dionisie and his school as "referencing other sources [and] another vision of art", as well as serving "other purposes."

At Bistrița, the Ecclesiarch had established a workshop of miniaturists. It is known to have included the monk Pahomie, who continued producing and illustrating Oltenian beadrolls into the 1830s, and is rated by scholars as Dionisie's most dedicated follower. Another highly productive student of his was Logothete Răducanu Poenaru, who may have been a relative of the Poenaru-Almăjanus, and who intervened on many works that required complex composition. This workshop and Dionisie's numerous attested collaborations introduce debates about the authorship of many individual paintings. Constantinescu opines that one skilled disciple, Partenie Zugrav, was called upon to do watercolor illustrations for Dionisie's beadroll at Țigănia skete, in Costești. In a 1966 piece, art historian Vasile Georgescu Paleolog argued that, with the exception of Bogdan Petriceicu Hasdeu, scholars had ignored Dionisie's contribution to national art; Paleolog's statement was regarded as an ignorant exaggeration by historian Paul Păltănea, who also suggests that a number of miniatures, including those of the Poenaru-Almăjanu register and a portrait of John Caradja for Cotroceni Monastery, have been misattributed to the Ecclesiarch. Poenaru and an unnamed draftsman are credited by Constantinescu as the true authors of several votive portraits in beadrolls penned by their teacher—including those of Radu Mihnea, Șerban Cantacuzino, and Mourouzis.

As seen by Constantinescu, the Ecclesiarch was "best represented" by his calligraphy, and especially by his (usually red or multicolored) initials, which appear to have been entirely designed by him. According to researcher Ion Vârtosu (whose view is rated by Păltănea as an interpretative standard), Dionisie was a superlative calligrapher, but utterly unremarkable as a painter; a more charitable view, by scholar T. G. Bulat, notes his abilities as a heraldic artist, but also defines some of his other drawings as "gauche", with purely documentary qualities. Șenilă-Vasiliu was enthusiastic about the monk's floral motifs, his "strong stylization" still allowing viewers to identify loving depictions of chicory, poppy, and, "most amazingly", blue rose flowers. Păltănea also reserves some praise for Dionisie's use of abstract models, seeing them as directly inspired by traditional Romanian handicrafts—against Paleolog, who proposes that they also stand as echoes of the Baroque. A mention of Dionisie's "Baroque taste" is also made by Constantinescu, though he also regards any such influence as subdued, and only present within a number of his floral drawings-watercolors; another source of "late Baroque" influences appeared in his occasional copying of Russian typeface. These were mixed with reinterpreted standards of Brâncovenesc calligraphy, ranging from green-colored daisies to withered irises, as well as with products of Dionisie's own "rural fantasy"—primarily his blue roses.

In some of his figurative works, Dionisie copied the canons governing Romanian Orthodox icons into a paper format, without however being classifiable as an "icon painter". While she cautions that Dionisie was neither "truly speaking a miniaturist", Șenilă-Vasiliu commends him for portraits of Dositei Filitti and other church figures. The same is argued by Constantinescu, according to whom Dionisie is "truly an artist" in his depictions of Filitti and Hegumen Paisie of Sadova—though here, and in all such works, "everything seems expedited and unfinished." A typical scene, repeated three times in his work (and three times more in somewhat adapted formats), is that of high-ranking clergymen presenting the book itself; as Constantinescu notes, these appear to have been largely copied from a more accomplished painter, known as Manea Zugrav. Figurative drawings and watercolors that are also clearly attributable to Dionisie include a number of highly decorative depictions, such as "mustachioed heads of tyewig-wearing Austrians" (nemți cu coadă), as well as sketches of Arnauts and Ottomans, as "grotesque symbols of a horrifying reality." He was very rarely engaged in genre painting, as with his scenes of monks engaged in angling, though, unlike some of his contemporaries, he never showed an interest in recording the lives of regular parishioners. He also did a sequence of animal illustrations—from snakes and dragons blended in with his initials, to yellow starlings nibbling down on violet grapes, flamingos, and a number of deer; as noted by Constantinescu, these are overall inferior to similar works by his less known contemporary monks. He was most often focused on heraldic beasts, which often included the Wallachian Bird, lions, and the double-headed eagle (the latter used as a tribute to the Cantacuzino family of boyars).

== Legacy ==
In addition to being depicted on the Mănăilești mural, Dionisie may have been portrayed by his pupil, Răducanu Poenaru, in a pencil sketch glued to a manuscript cover of 1815. Interest for the Ecclesiarch's literary work was revived in the United Principalities, from 1859, and later in their successor-state, the Kingdom of Romania. At least 25 of his registers were taken for preservation at the National Archives in Bucharest. Simota informs that these are all of artistic importance: "One finds here splendid majuscules, scenes and portraits, in D[ionisie]'s own hand. They form an interesting chapter in the history of Romanian miniatures." Hronograful was only printed in 1863 by Alexandru Papiu Ilarian, as part of an anthology of historical sources. A standalone edition appeared in 1934, with folklorist Constantin S. Nicolăescu-Plopșor as its curator.

Under the communist regime, the Romanian Academy considered putting out a critical edition of the text, from as early as 1960. Seen as a "language source" and a "magnificent writer" by Eugen Barbu, who relied heavily on Hronograful for his own novel, Princepele, Dionisie was partly republished in an anthology of Oltenian writers, put out by Florea Firan in 1975 (at the time, Firan was chairman of Dolj County's Council for Socialist Culture and Education). Writing in 1982 for a preface of albums by Dionisie and his pupils, Constantinescu summarized the status of scholarship: "Surely, he was the subject of some lines of text, albeit ones that would be fully supportive, or even somewhat benevolent, in obscure publications and not available to most readers. The mysteries of his humble biography and his questionable talents as a chronicler have been the only two things that tie up with his name to have borne out any sort of scrutiny." Under contract with the Academy, Bălașa and Stoicescu only issued a critical edition of Hronograful in 1987.
