= Păscoaia =

- Location within Romania

Location
- Country: Romania
- Counties: Vâlcea County

Physical characteristics
- Source: Lotru Mountains
- Mouth: Lotru
  - location: Păscoaia
  - coordinates: 45.3524°N 24.1556°E
- Length: 23 km (14 mi)
- Basin size: 122 km^{2} (47 sq mi)

Basin features
- Progression: Lotru→ Olt→ Danube→ Black Sea
- Tributaries
  - right: Priboiasa

The Păscoaia is a left tributary of the river Lotru in Romania. The 23 km (14 mi) long Păscoaia flows into the Lotru in the similarly named village of Păscoaia. Its basin size is 122 km^{2} (47 sq mi).

== Tributaries ==
The following rivers are tributaries to the river Păscoaia (from source to mouth):

- Left: Pârcălabul, Mândra, Neteda, Pleșoaia, Pietroșița, Pârâul Cloambelor, Purcărețu
- Right: Cheia Păscoaia, Valea Ursului, Pietrosu, Pârâul Arsurilor, Pădurețu, Priboiasa, Plăieșu
