= Voineșița =

- Location within Romania

Location
- Country: Romania
- Counties: Vâlcea County
- Villages: Voineșița

Physical characteristics
- Mouth: Lotru
  - coordinates: 45.4131°N 23.9652°E
- Length: 16 km (9.9 mi)
- Basin size: 75 km^{2} (29 sq mi)

Basin features
- Progression: Lotru→ Olt→ Danube→ Black Sea
- Tributaries
  - left: Delușelu
  - right: Jidoaia

The Voineșița is a left tributary of the river Lotru in Romania. The 16 km (9.9 mi) Voineșița discharges into the Lotru in the village of Voineșița. Its basin size is 75 km^{2} (29 sq mi).
