= Ștevia River =

Ștevia River may refer to:

- Ștevia, a tributary of the Azuga in Prahova County, Romania
- Ștevia, a tributary of the Râușor in Hunedoara County, Romania
- Ștevia, a tributary of the Rudăreasa in Vâlcea County, Romania
