= Jidoaia =

- Location within Romania

Location
- Country: Romania
- Counties: Vâlcea County

Physical characteristics
- Mouth: Voineșița
  - coordinates: 45.4664°N 23.9855°E
- Length: 14 km (8.7 mi)
- Basin size: 37 km^{2} (14 sq mi)

Basin features
- Progression: Voineșița→ Lotru→ Olt→ Danube→ Black Sea
- Tributaries
  - right: Rânjeu

The Jidoaia is a right tributary of the river Voineșița in Romania. Its source is on the southeastern slope of Negovanu Mare peak, Lotru Mountains. Its length is 14 km (8.7 mi) and its basin size is 37 km^{2} (14 sq mi).
