= Păiușu River =

Păiușu River may refer to:

- Păiușu River (Lotru), a tributary of the Mălaia River in Romania
- Păiușu, a tributary of the Jiu in Gorj County, Romania
