= Izvorul Gotia =

Izvorul Gotia Goața Mare
- Location within Romania

Location
- Country: Romania
- Counties: Vâlcea County

Physical characteristics
- Mouth: Lotru
  - location: Vidra Lake
  - coordinates: 45.4383°N 23.7470°E
- Length: 8 km (5.0 mi)
- Basin size: 15 km^{2} (5.8 sq mi)

Basin features
- Progression: Lotru→ Olt→ Danube→ Black Sea
- Tributaries
  - right: Izvorul Băluțu, Izvorul Doamnei

The Izvorul Gotia is a left tributary of the river Lotru in Romania. It discharges into Vidra Lake, which is drained by the Lotru. Its length is 8 km (5.0 mi) and its basin size is 15 km^{2} (5.8 sq mi).
