= Balu (Lotru) =

- Location within Romania

Location
- Country: Romania
- Counties: Vâlcea County

Physical characteristics
- Mouth: Lotru
  - location: Vidra Lake
  - coordinates: 45.4324°N 23.6976°E
- Length: 9 km (5.6 mi)
- Basin size: 14 km^{2} (5.4 sq mi)

Basin features
- Progression: Lotru→ Olt→ Danube→ Black Sea

The Balu is a left tributary of the river Lotru in Romania. It discharges into Vidra Lake, which is drained by the Lotru. Its length is 9 km (5.6 mi) and its basin size 14 km^{2} (5.4 sq mi).
