= Priboiasa =

- Location within Romania

Location
- Country: Romania
- Counties: Vâlcea County

Physical characteristics
- Mouth: Păscoaia
  - coordinates: 45.3975°N 24.1207°E
- Length: 14 km (8.7 mi)
- Basin size: 45 km^{2} (17 sq mi)

Basin features
- Progression: Păscoaia→ Lotru→ Olt→ Danube→ Black Sea

The Priboiasa is a right tributary of the river Păscoaia in Romania. It flows into the Păscoaia north of Săliștea. Its length is 14 km (8.7 mi) and its basin size is 45 km^{2} (17 sq mi).

== Tributaries ==
The following rivers are tributaries to the river Priboiasa (from source to mouth):

- Left: Stâna, Sturii Mari, Sturii Mici, Găina, Calul, Vladimiru
- Right: Mlaca Fântânii, Căprioara, Totușca Mare, Totușca Mică, Bradu, Clăbuceasa, Poarta, Pleșu
