= Valea Socilor River =

Valea Socilor River may refer to:

- Valea Socilor, a tributary of the Șușița in Gorj County, Romania
- Valea Socilor, a tributary of the Vasilatu in Vâlcea County, Romania
