= Berislăvești =

- Commune
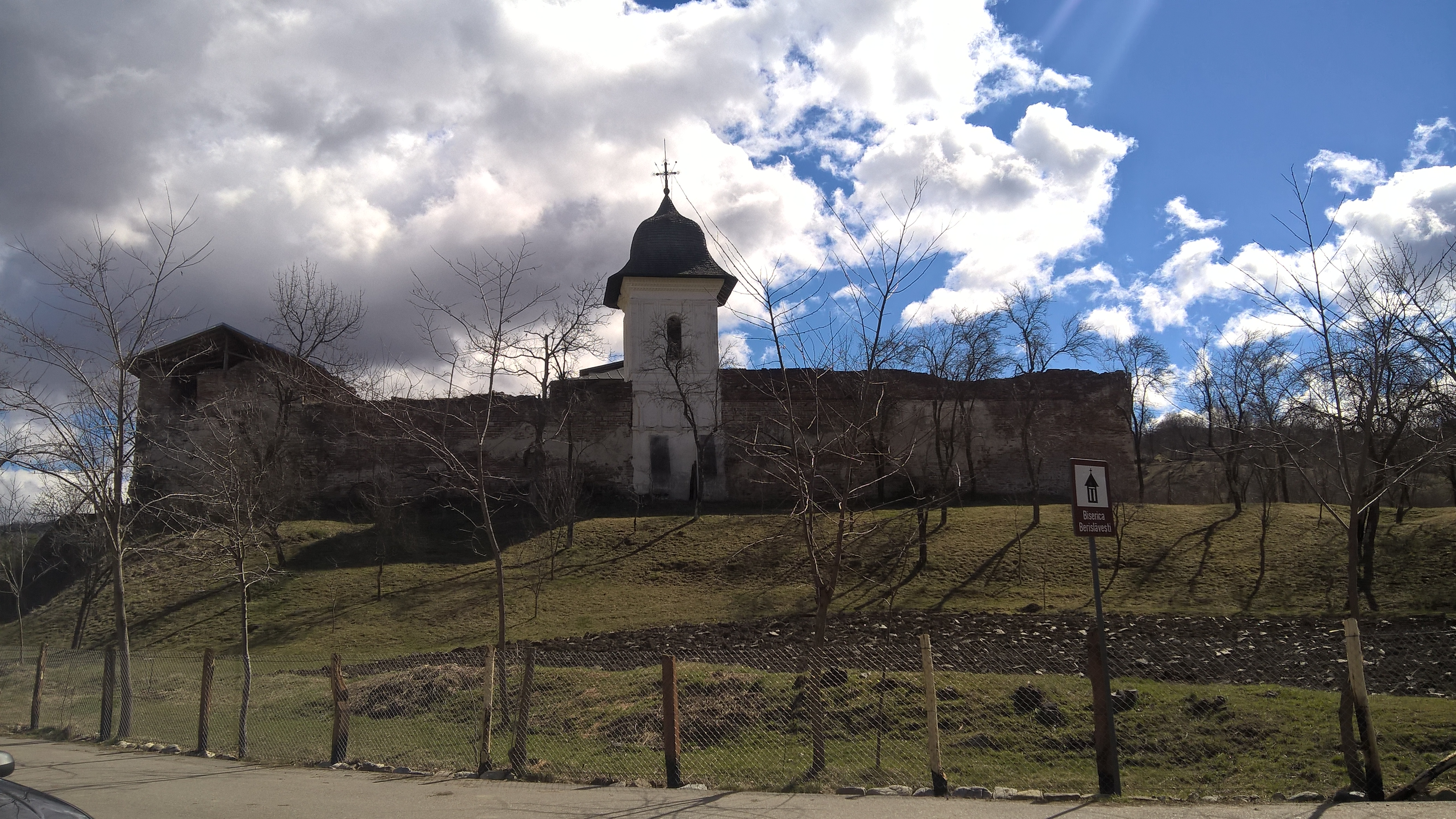
- Berislăvești Monastery

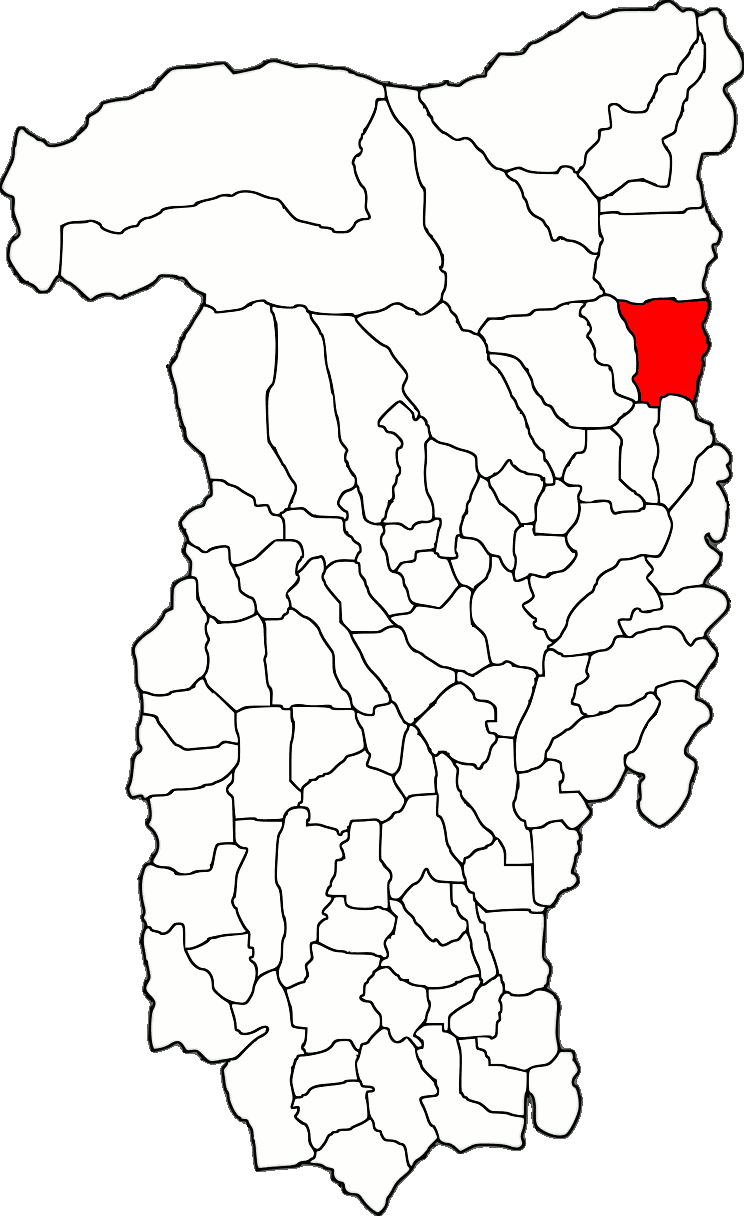
- Location in Vâlcea County

- Location in Romania
- Coordinates: 45°15′N 24°25′E
- Country: Romania
- County: Vâlcea

Government
  - Mayor (2024–2028): Nicolae Popescu (PSD)
- Area: 66.99 km^{2} (25.86 sq mi)
- Elevation: 421 m (1,381 ft)
- Population (2021-12-01): 2,418
  - Density: 36.09/km^{2} (93.49/sq mi)
- Time zone: UTC+02:00 (EET)
  - Summer (DST): UTC+03:00 (EEST)
- Postal code: 247047
- Area code: (+40) 0250
- Vehicle reg.: VL
- Website: primariaberislavesti.ro

Berislăvești is a commune in Vâlcea County, Romania. It is composed of seven villages: Berislăvești, Brădișor, Dângești, Rădăcinești, Robaia, Scăueni, and Stoenești. Like all of Vâlcea, it is situated in the historical region of Oltenia.

The Brădișor Dam is a large hydroelectric dam on the Lotru River.

Historical population
| Year | Pop. | ±% |
|---|---|---|
| 2002 | 3,083 | — |
| 2011 | 2,769 | −10.2% |
| 2021 | 2,418 | −12.7% |
Source: Census data

== Natives ==
- Gheorghe Boroi (born 1964), Olympic hurdler
- Dionisie Eclesiarhul (c. 1740 – 1820), chronicler, calligrapher, illustrator, and monk

== See also ==
- Castra of Rădăcinești
