= Hoteag =

- Location within Romania

Location
- Country: Romania
- Counties: Vâlcea County

Physical characteristics
- Mouth: Lotru
  - coordinates: 45.4601°N 23.9087°E
- Length: 8 km (5.0 mi)
- Basin size: 17 km^{2} (6.6 sq mi)

Basin features
- Progression: Lotru→ Olt→ Danube→ Black Sea
- Tributaries
  - right: Gateru

The Hoteag is a left tributary of the river Lotru in Romania. Its source is on the southern slope of Negovanu Mare peak, Lotru Mountains. It flows into the Lotru upstream from Voineasa. Its length is 8 km (5.0 mi) and its basin size is 17 km^{2} (6.6 sq mi).
