= Pleșu River =

Pleșu River may refer to:

- Pleșu, a tributary of the Priboiasa in Vâlcea County
- Pleșu, a tributary of the Jaleș in Gorj County
- Pleșu, a tributary of the Teleajen in Prahova County
