= Cărbunele River =

Cărbunele River may refer to:

- Cărbunele, a tributary of the Lotru in Vâlcea County
- Cărbunele Negru River
