= Castra of Rădăcinești =

Fort in the Roman province of Dacia

- Location within Romania
- 45.2814°N 24.4424°E
- Location: Căminul cultural, Rădăcinești, Vâlcea, Romania

Site notes
- Excavation dates: 1971 - 1972
- Condition: Ruined

Castra of Rădăcinești was a fort in the Roman province of Dacia near the Limes Alutanus on the west bank of the Olt River.

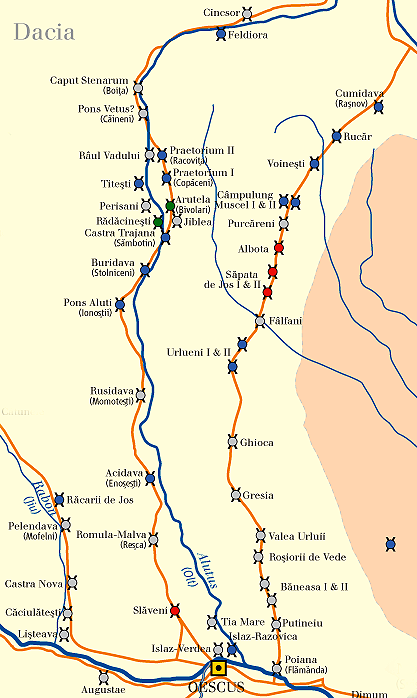
Limes Alutanus (left)

== See also ==
- List of castra
