= Rudăreasa =

- Location within Romania

Location
- Country: Romania
- Counties: Vâlcea County

Physical characteristics
- Source: Latorița Mountains
- Mouth: Latorița
  - coordinates: 45.3854°N 23.9548°E
- Length: 14 km (8.7 mi)
- Basin size: 31 km^{2} (12 sq mi)

Basin features
- Progression: Latorița→ Lotru→ Olt→ Danube→ Black Sea

The Rudăreasa is a left tributary of the Latorița in Romania. It discharges into the Latorița in Ciungetu. Its length is 14 km (8.7 mi) and its basin size is 31 km^{2} (12 sq mi).

== Tributaries ==
The following rivers are tributaries to the river Rudăreasa (from source to mouth):

- Left: Poiana Mică, Ștevia
- Right: Pârâul Stânei Bătrâne, Părăginosu, Barbocet, Pârâul Negrenilor, Pârâul Sec, Pârâul lui Ciucă, Dolia Frumoasă, Pârâul Bârloagelor, Gruiul Negru
