= Mănăileasa =

- Location within Romania

Location
- Country: Romania
- Counties: Vâlcea County

Physical characteristics
- Mouth: Lotru
  - location: Voineasa
  - coordinates: 45.4268°N 23.9501°E
- Length: 13 km (8.1 mi)
- Basin size: 33 km^{2} (13 sq mi)

Basin features
- Progression: Lotru→ Olt→ Danube→ Black Sea
- Tributaries
  - left: Nopteasa
  - right: Pârâul Plaiului

The Mănăileasa is a right tributary of the river Lotru in south-central Romania. The 13 km (8.1 mi) long Mănăileasa discharges into the Lotru in Voineasa. Its basin size is 33 km^{2} (13 sq mi).
