= Vasilat =

- Location within Romania

Location
- Country: Romania
- Counties: Vâlcea County

Physical characteristics
- Mouth: Lotru
  - location: Valea lui Stan
  - coordinates: 45.3468°N 24.2083°E
- Length: 16 km (9.9 mi)
- Basin size: 44 km^{2} (17 sq mi)

Basin features
- Progression: Lotru→ Olt→ Danube→ Black Sea

The Vasilat is a left tributary of the river Lotru in south-central Romania. It empties into the Lotru in Valea lui Stan near Brezoi. Its length is 16 km (9.9 mi) and its basin size is 44 km^{2} (17 sq mi).

== Tributaries ==
The following rivers are tributaries to the river Vasilat (from source to mouth):

- Left: Pârâul cu Lespezi, Valea Socilor, Valea Cârpătoare, Valea Boului, Șchioapa, Glodu, Valea Greșurilor
- Right: Izvorul Frumos, Ciortea, Valea Largă, Valea Cocinilor, Secăreaua
