= Brădișor Dam =

Dam in Brădișor, Romania

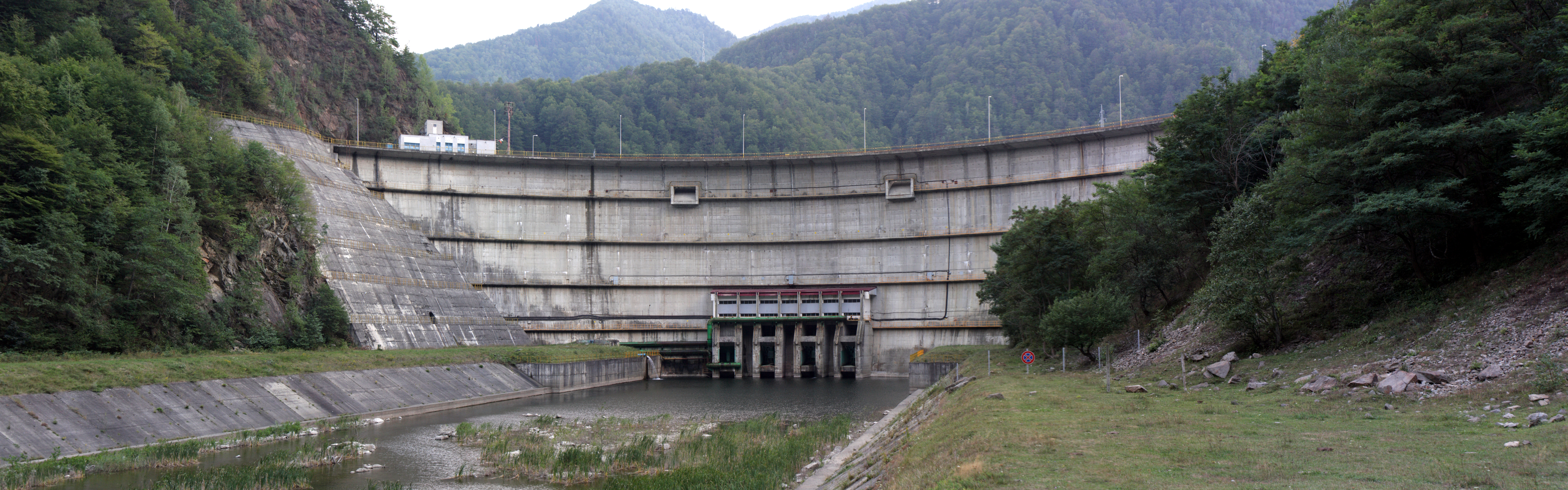

- Location within Romania
- Location: Brădișor, Vâlcea County
- Coordinates: 45.3550°N 24.1050°E
- Type: reservoir
- Primary inflows: Lotru
- Primary outflows: Lotru
- Basin countries: Romania
- Surface area: 1 km^{2} (0.39 sq mi)
- Water volume: 39 million cubic metres (32,000 acre⋅ft)

Brădișor Dam is a large hydroelectric dam on the Lotru River situated in Romania.

The project was started and finished in the 1980s and it was made up of the construction of a rockfill with a clay core dam 30 metres (98 ft) high which was equipped with two vertical turbines, Brădișor Hydro Power Plant having an installed capacity of 115 MW.

The dam generates 223 GWh of electricity per year.

== See also ==
- Iron Gate I Hydroelectric Power Station
- Iron Gate II Hydroelectric Power Station
