= Ștefănești, Vâlcea =

Ștefănești
- Commune
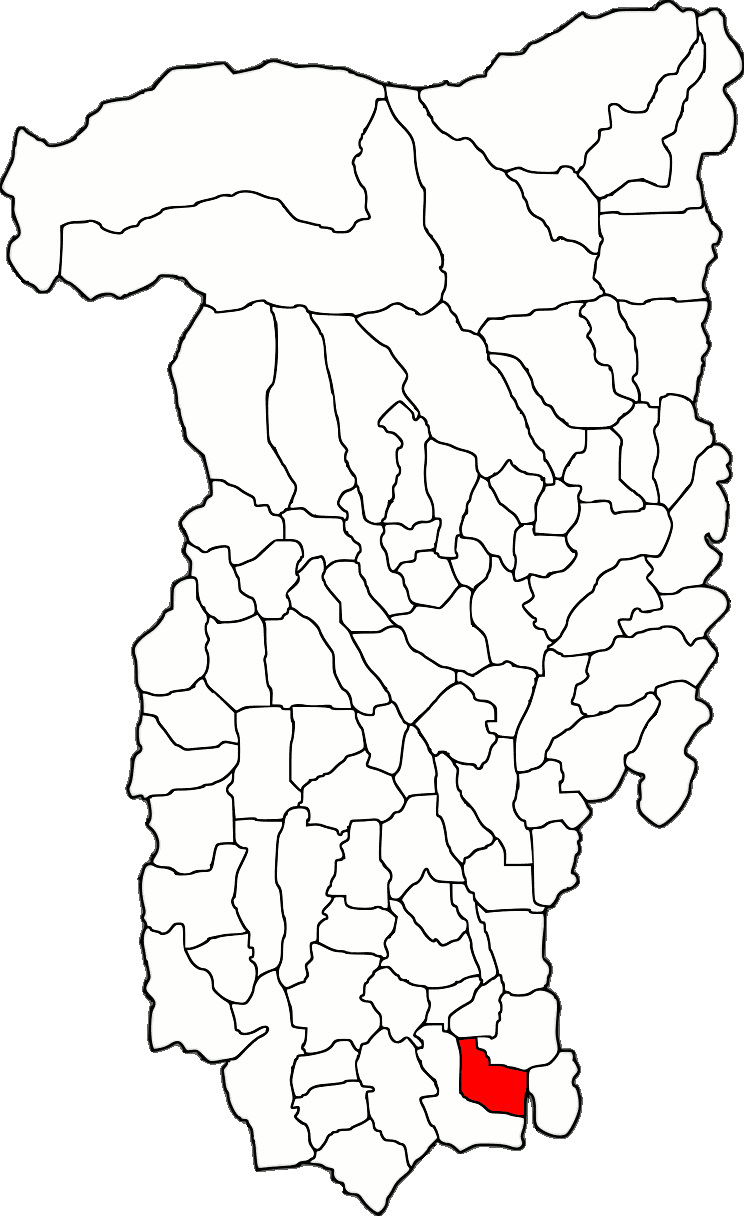
- Location in Vâlcea County

- Location in Romania
- Coordinates: 44°37′N 24°14′E
- Country: Romania
- County: Vâlcea
- Area: 36.26 km^{2} (14.00 sq mi)
- Population (2021-12-01): 3,106
  - Density: 85.66/km^{2} (221.9/sq mi)
- Time zone: UTC+02:00 (EET)
  - Summer (DST): UTC+03:00 (EEST)
- Vehicle reg.: VL

Ștefănești is a commune located in Vâlcea County, Oltenia, Romania. It is composed of four villages: Condoiești, Dobrușa, Șerbănești and Ștefănești.
