= Malaia garnet =

Gemological varietal name for certain colors of garnet

General
- Category: Varietal name
- Formula: (Mg,Mn)_{3}Al_{2}(SiO_{4})_{3}
- Crystal system: cubic

Identification
- Color: light to dark slightly pinkish orange, reddish orange, yellowish orange
- Cleavage: none, may show indistinct parting
- Fracture: conchoidal
- Mohs scale hardness: 7 - 7.5
- Luster: vitreous
- Diaphaneity: transparent
- Specific gravity: 3.78 - 3.85
- Polish luster: vitreous to subadamantine
- Optical properties: Single refractive, often anomalous double refractive
- Refractive index: 1.760 (+.020, -.018)
- Birefringence: none
- Pleochroism: none
- Ultraviolet fluorescence: inert
- Absorption spectra: strong lines at 410, 420, 430nm, that may merge to form cutoff below 435nm. Also some combination of lines at 460, 480, 504, 520, or 573nm.

Malaia garnet or Malaya garnet is a gemological varietal name for light to dark slightly pinkish orange, reddish orange, or yellowish orange garnet, that are of a mixture within the pyralspite series pyrope, almandine, and spessartine with a little calcium. In Swahili, Malaia means "out of the family", a reference to how this variety was initially set aside by miners looking for gem quality rhodolite. It is found in east Africa, in the Umba Valley bordering Tanzania and Kenya.
