= Mălaia (river) =

- Location within Romania

Location
- Country: Romania
- Counties: Vâlcea County

Physical characteristics
- Mouth: Lotru
  - location: Upstream of Mălaia
  - coordinates: 45.3554°N 24.0178°E
- Length: 9 km (5.6 mi)
- Basin size: 27 km^{2} (10 sq mi)

Basin features
- Progression: Lotru→ Olt→ Danube→ Black Sea
- Tributaries
  - left: Iezer
  - right: Cârpănoasa, Păiuș

The Mălaia (also: Mălăița) is a right tributary of the river Lotru in south-central Romania. It flows into the Lotru near the village Malaia. Its length is 9 km (5.6 mi) and its basin size is 27 km^{2} (10 sq mi).
