= Brezoi =

- Town
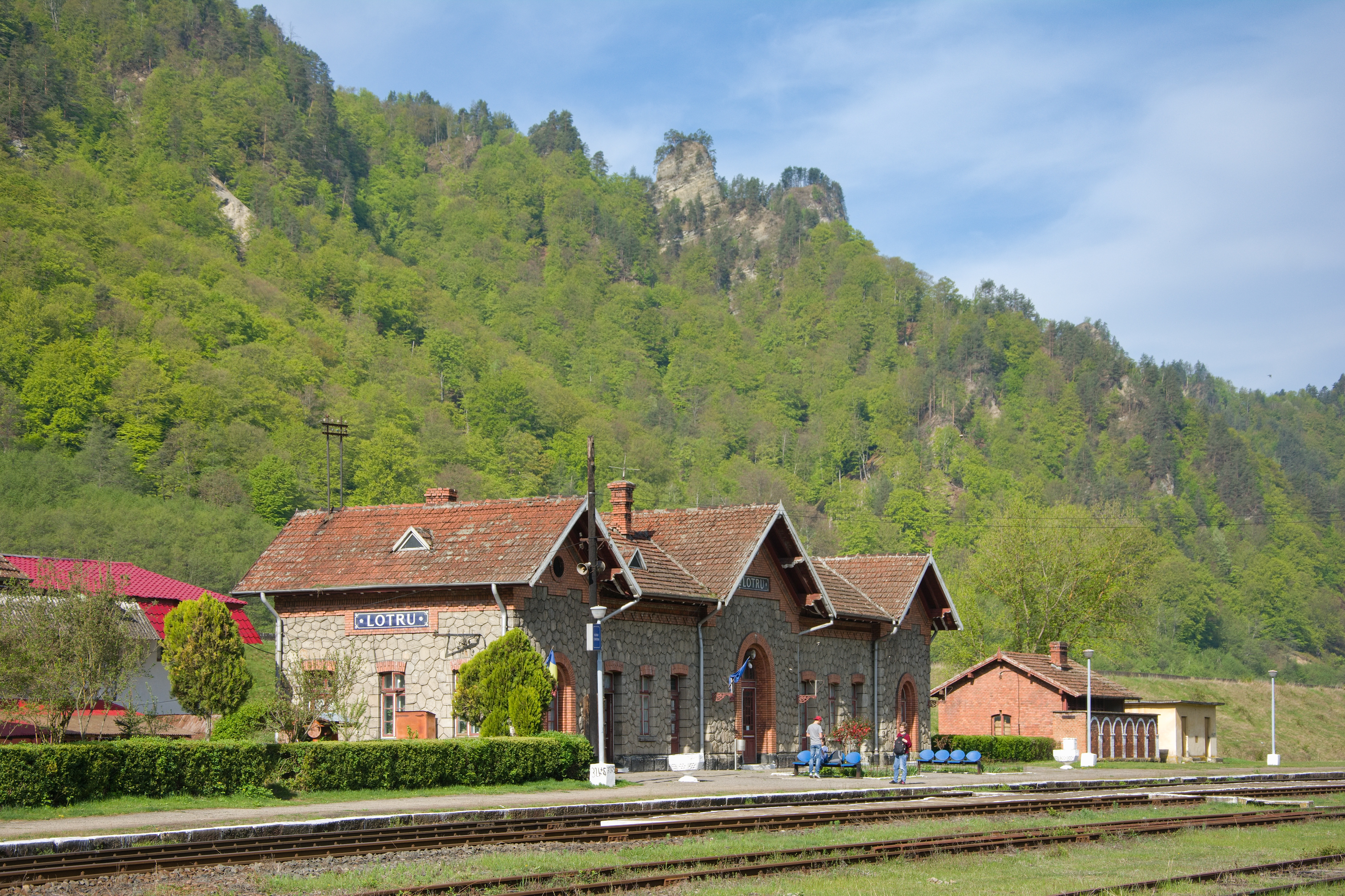
- The Lotru train station in Brezoi

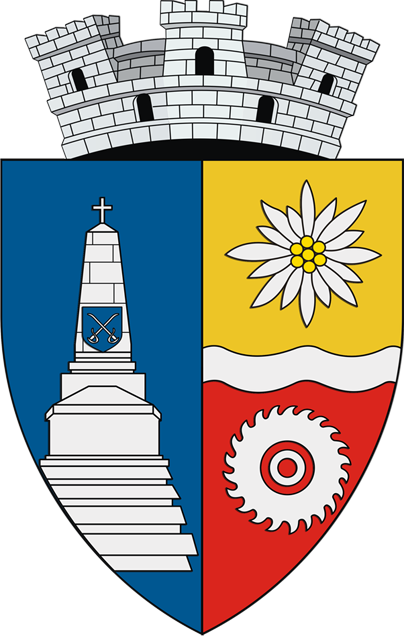
- Coat of arms

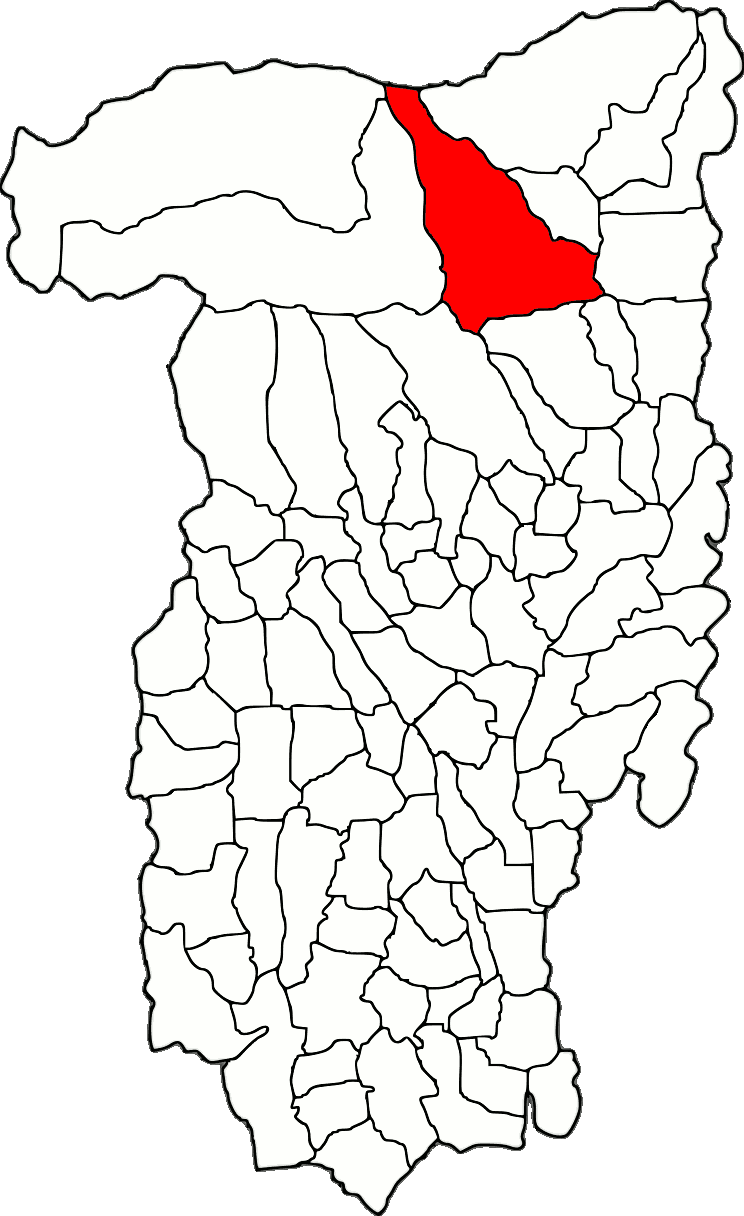
- Location in Vâlcea County

- Location in Romania
- Coordinates: 45°21′N 24°15′E
- Country: Romania
- County: Vâlcea

Government
  - Mayor (2024–2028): Robert Adrian Schell (PNL)
- Area: 110 km^{2} (42 sq mi)
- Elevation: 330 m (1,080 ft)
- Population (2021-12-01): 5,696
  - Density: 52/km^{2} (130/sq mi)
- Time zone: UTC+02:00 (EET)
  - Summer (DST): UTC+03:00 (EEST)
- Postal code: 245500
- Area code: (+40) 0250
- Vehicle reg.: VL

Brezoi is a town located in Vâlcea County, Romania. It administers eight villages: Călinești, Corbu, Drăgănești, Golotreni, Păscoaia, Proieni, Valea lui Stan, and Văratica. It is situated in the historical region of Oltenia.

The town is situated in the foothills of the Southern Carpathians, at altitude of 330 m (1,080 ft). It lies on the banks of the Olt River, as it makes its way south of the Turnu Roșu Pass; the Lotru flows into the Olt in Golotreni.

== Demography ==
Historical population
Year	Pop.	±%
1977	6,907	—
1992	7,547	+9.3%
2002	7,589	+0.6%
2011	5,691	−25.0%
2021	5,696	+0.1%
Source: Census data

== Notable people ==
- Medi Dinu (1909–2016), painter, of Jewish origin, belonging to the interbellum avant-garde current
- Mihai Țurcan (born 1941), footballer

== See also ==
- Buila-Vânturarița National Park
- Cozia National Park
