= Vidra Lake =

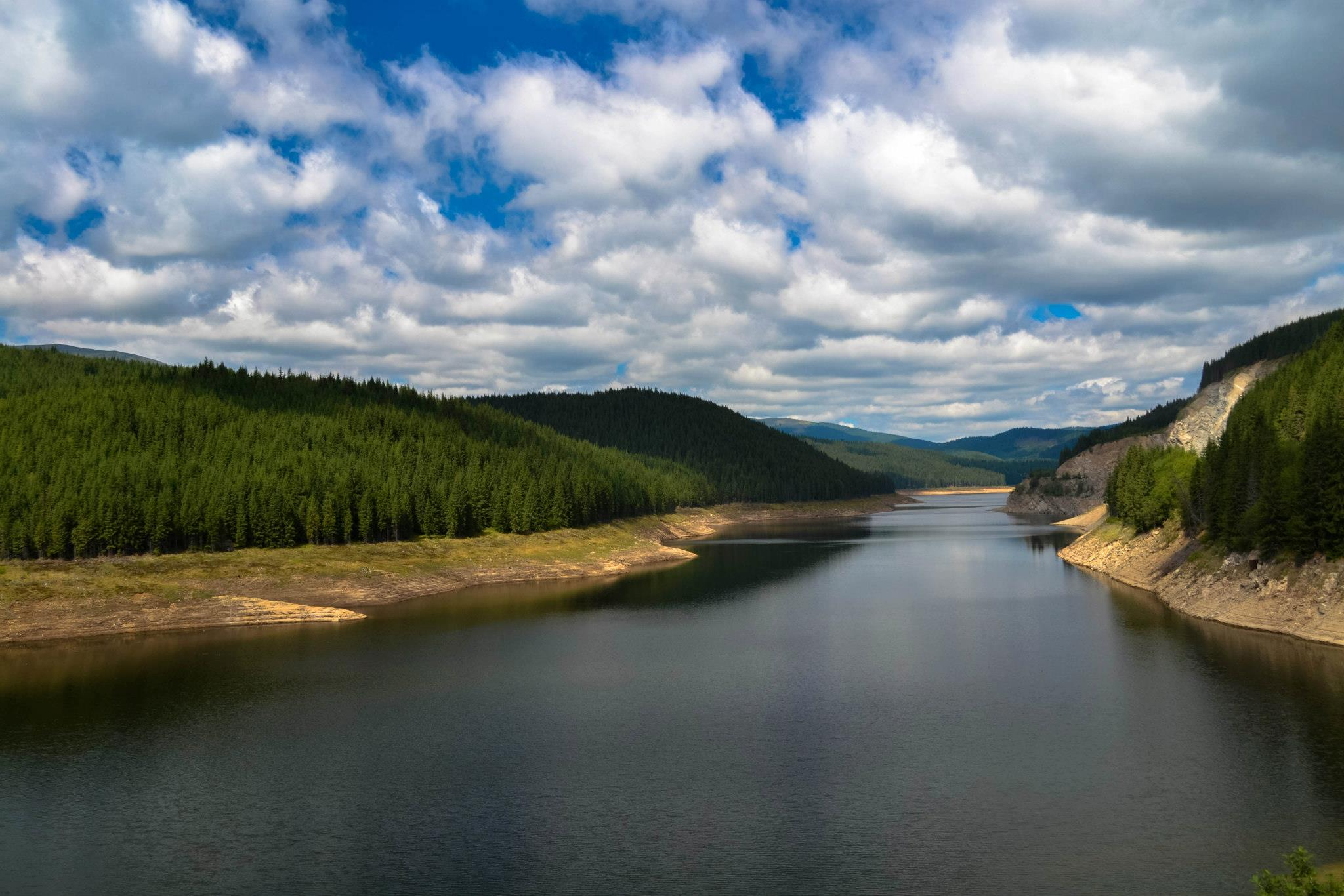

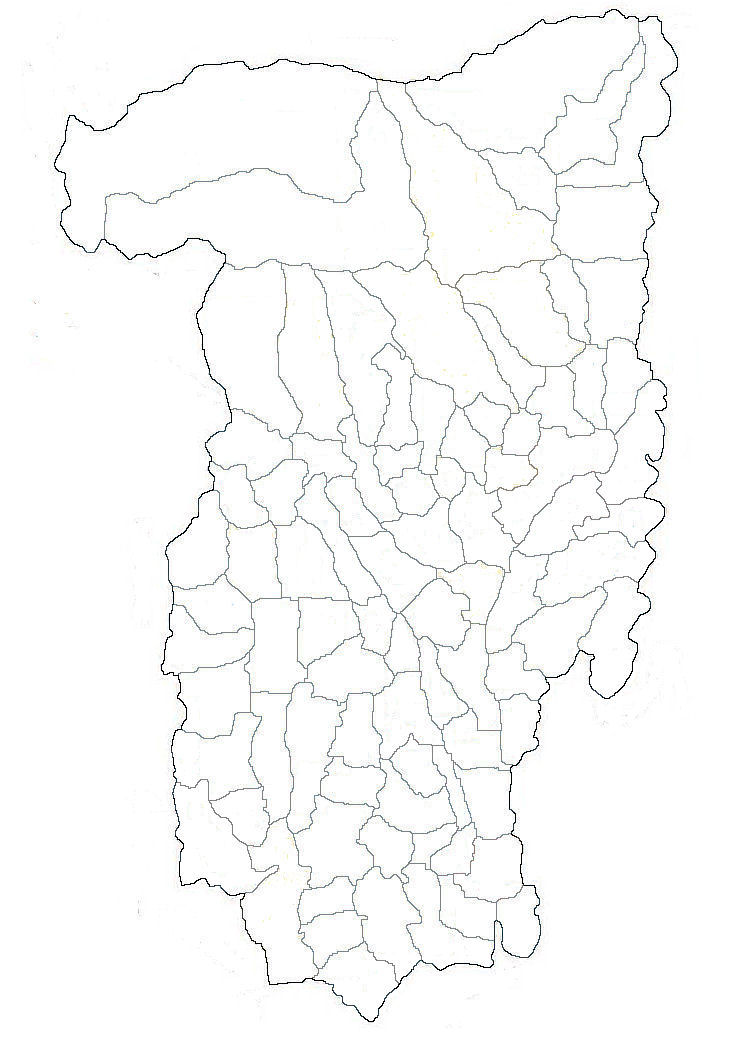
- Location within Vâlcea County
- Location: Parâng Mountains
- Coordinates: 45°25′50″N 23°44′0″E
- Type: artificial lake
- Primary inflows: Lotru River
- Primary outflows: Lotru River
- Basin countries: Romania
- Max. length: 8 km (5.0 mi)
- Max. width: 1.4 km (0.87 mi)
- Surface area: 12.40 km^{2} (4.79 sq mi)
- Water volume: 340 hm^{3} (280,000 acre⋅ft)
- Surface elevation: 1,289 m (4,229 ft)

Vidra Lake is a storage reservoir, located in the Parâng Mountains group, on the Lotru River, in Vâlcea County, in south-central Romania.

The lake has an area of 12.40 km^{2} (4.79 sq mi) and a volume of 340×10^{6} m^{3} (1.2×10^{10} cu ft).

Its associated hydroelectric plant, Lotru-Ciunget, has a maximum power output of 510 MW, using an altitude difference of about 800 m (2,600 ft).

The dam and the hydro plant were built between 1965 and 1972. It is the second largest hydro plant in Romania, after the Iron Gates I and II power stations.

== See also ==
- List of lakes in Romania
- Reservoirs and dams in Romania
