= Voineasa, Vâlcea =

Voineasa
- Commune
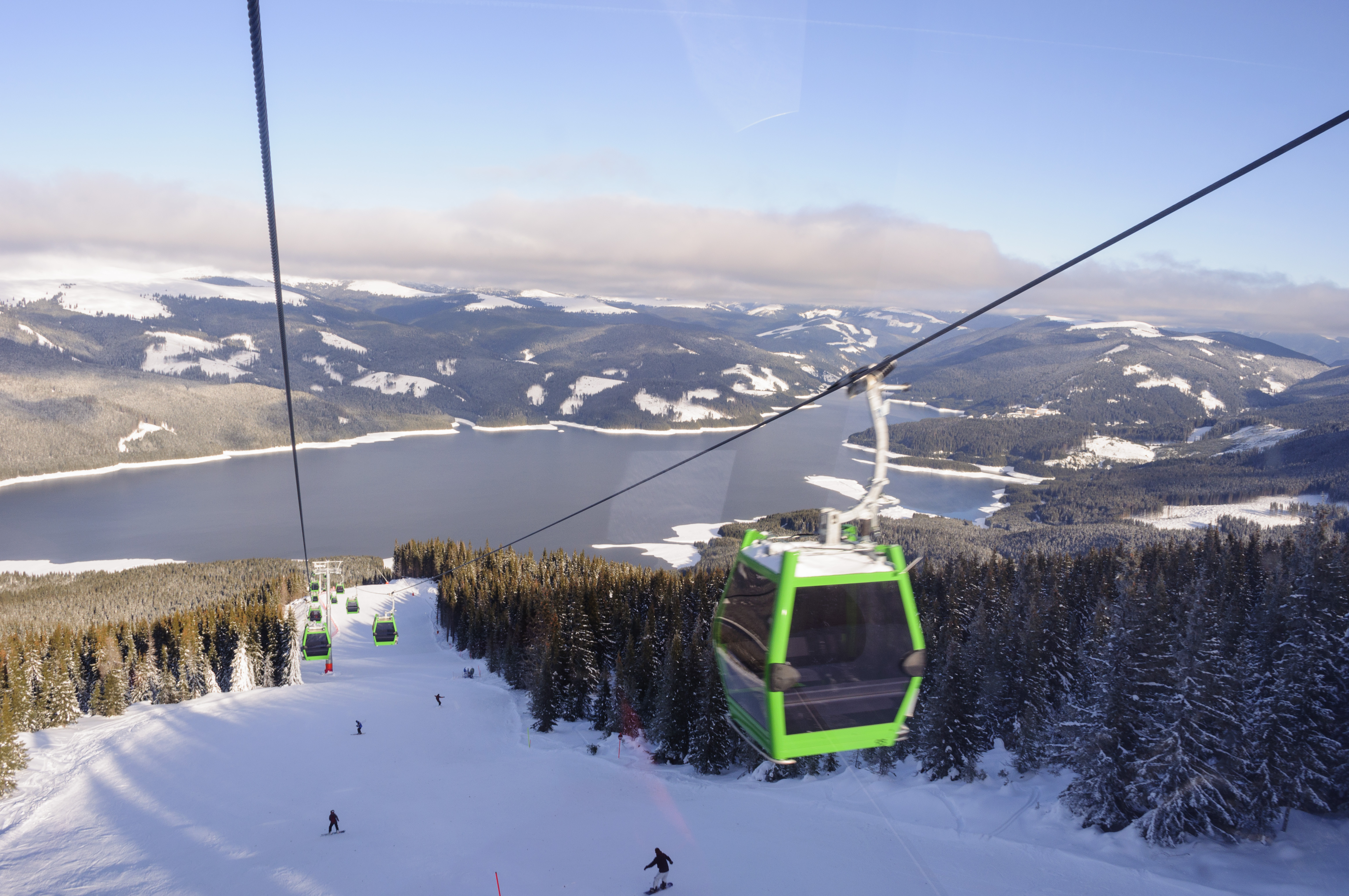
- Ski slope in Voineasa

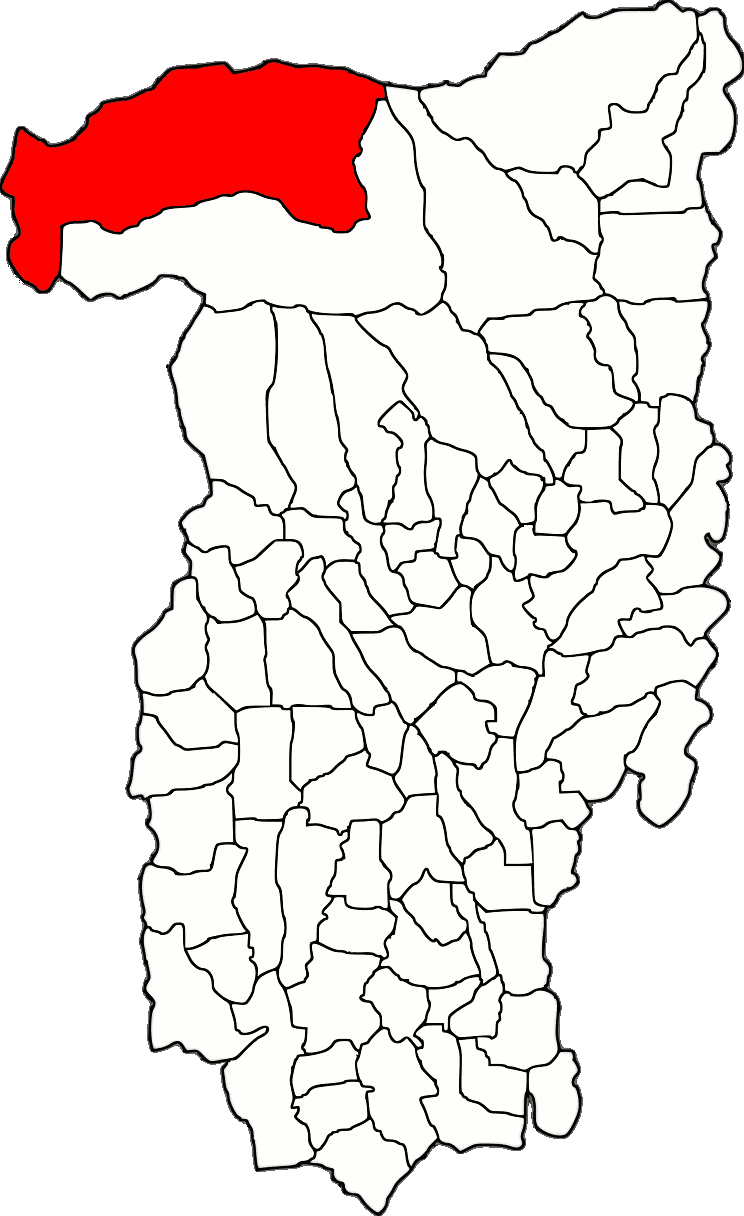
- Location in Vâlcea County

- Location in Romania
- Coordinates: 45°25′N 23°57′E
- Country: Romania
- County: Vâlcea

Government
  - Mayor (2020–2024): Gabriel-Sebastian Năstăsescu (PSD)
- Elevation: 592 m (1,942 ft)
- Population (2021-12-01): 1,224
- Time zone: UTC+02:00 (EET)
  - Summer (DST): UTC+03:00 (EEST)
- Postal code: 247750
- Area code: +(40) 250
- Vehicle reg.: VL
- Website: www.primariavoineasa.ro

Voineasa is a commune located in Vâlcea County, Oltenia, Romania. It is composed of three villages: Valea Măceșului, Voineasa, and Voineșița.

Situated on the valley of the Lotru River, the commune is also a spa resort, with a Communist-era hotel dominating the locality, as well as several other tourist facilities. 25 km (16 mi) upstream of the valley is Vidra Lake, one of the largest dams and reservoirs in Romania, built between 1965 and 1972, and also the newly built Transalpina ski resort on lake's shore (Transalpina Resort is not on Transalpina Road but is connected to it by road).

== Climate ==
Climate data for Voineasa (elevation 573m, 2014–2026 normals, extremes 1980–present)
Month	Jan	Feb	Mar	Apr	May	Jun	Jul	Aug	Sep	Oct	Nov	Dec	Year
Record high °C (°F)	15.3 (59.5)	20.4 (68.7)	25.5 (77.9)	28.9 (84.0)	30.0 (86.0)	35.4 (95.7)	36.7 (98.1)	36.7 (98.1)	32.4 (90.3)	26.6 (79.9)	22.8 (73.0)	14.6 (58.3)	36.7 (98.1)
Mean daily maximum °C (°F)	2.6 (36.7)	6.7 (44.1)	11.9 (53.4)	16.8 (62.2)	20.4 (68.7)	25.8 (78.4)	27.2 (81.0)	27.5 (81.5)	22.2 (72.0)	15.6 (60.1)	8.7 (47.7)	3.7 (38.7)	15.8 (60.4)
Daily mean °C (°F)	−1.3 (29.7)	1.9 (35.4)	5.7 (42.3)	9.8 (49.6)	13.9 (57.0)	18.6 (65.5)	19.8 (67.6)	19.8 (67.6)	15.5 (59.9)	9.6 (49.3)	4.8 (40.6)	0.6 (33.1)	9.9 (49.8)
Mean daily minimum °C (°F)	−5.2 (22.6)	−2.9 (26.8)	−0.5 (31.1)	2.8 (37.0)	7.3 (45.1)	11.4 (52.5)	12.4 (54.3)	12.2 (54.0)	8.9 (48.0)	3.6 (38.5)	0.8 (33.4)	−2.5 (27.5)	4.0 (39.2)
Record low °C (°F)	−25.8 (−14.4)	−23.5 (−10.3)	−22.0 (−7.6)	−5.6 (21.9)	−1.8 (28.8)	0.5 (32.9)	3.5 (38.3)	1.0 (33.8)	−2.7 (27.1)	−9.2 (15.4)	−16.2 (2.8)	−18.0 (−0.4)	−25.8 (−14.4)
Average precipitation mm (inches)	28.8 (1.13)	15.5 (0.61)	27.8 (1.09)	36.3 (1.43)	91.1 (3.59)	119.5 (4.70)	131.1 (5.16)	80.8 (3.18)	67.1 (2.64)	37.6 (1.48)	44.9 (1.77)	27.0 (1.06)	707.5 (27.84)
Average precipitation days (≥ 1.0 mm)	3.5	3.2	4.6	6.5	12.0	11.2	9.5	7.9	7.2	4.8	6.5	4.8	81.7
Average snowy days	1.3	1.1	0.1	0	0	0	0	0	0	0	0.3	0.8	3.6
Source 1: Meteomanz (2014-2026)
Source 2: Revista geografică 2005

== Natives ==
- Alexandru Ionuț Popescu (born 1998), footballer
