= Lotru =

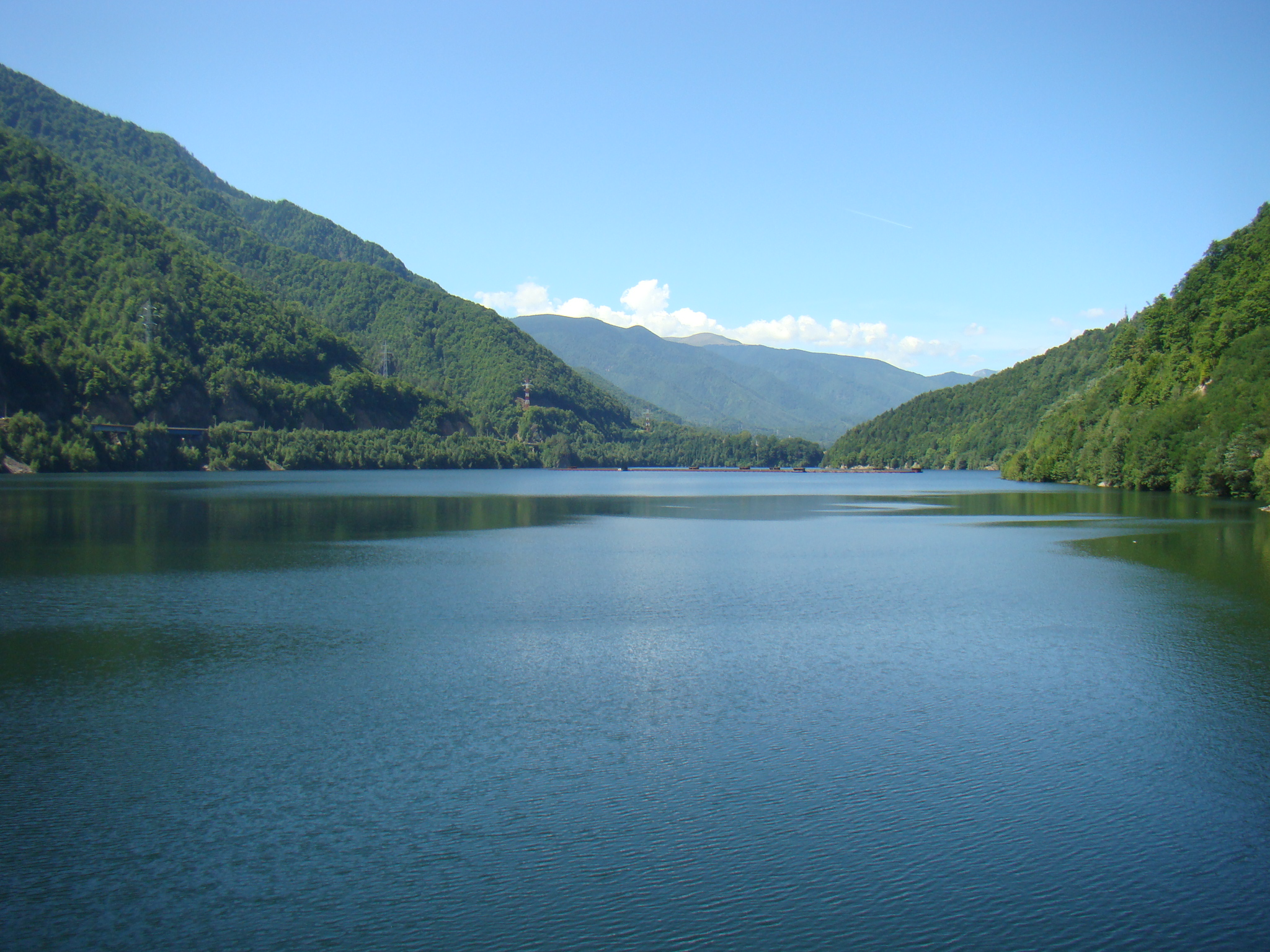
- Brădișor reservoir

- Location within Romania

Location
- Country: Romania
- Counties: Vâlcea County
- Towns: Brezoi

Physical characteristics
- Source: Parâng Mountains
- Mouth: Olt
  - location: Brezoi
  - coordinates: 45°20′10″N 24°16′31″E
- Length: 83 km (52 mi)
- Basin size: 990 km^{2} (380 sq mi)

Basin features
- Progression: Olt→ Danube→ Black Sea
- Tributaries
  - left: Voineșița, Păscoaia
  - right: Latorița

The Lotru is a right tributary of the river Olt in Romania. Its source is in the Parâng Mountains. It feeds the reservoirs Vidra, Malaia and Brădișor. It passes through the Voineasa, Malaia, and Brezoi communes and flows into the Olt in Golotreni, near the town of Brezoi. Its length is 83 km (52 mi) and its basin size is 990 km^{2} (380 sq mi).

== Tributaries ==
The following rivers are tributaries to the river Lotru (from source to mouth):

Left: Găuri, Izvorul Gropii, Pravăț, Valea Tâmpei, Balu, Sărăcinul Mare, Sărăcinul de Mijloc, Sărăcinul Mic, Izvorul Gotia, Goața Mică, Steaja, Haneș, Balindru, Furnica Mare, Stricatu, Hoteag, Dobrun, Tumurel, Valea Pietrei, Pârâul Mare, Voineșița, Vătaf, Pârâul Carpenilor, Rudar, Pârâul Ursului, Păltinoasa, Luntrișoara, Valea Rea, Valea Priboilor, Teiu, Runcu, Păscoaia, Valea Caprei, Vasilat and Dobra

Right: Coasta, Valea Lacului, Izvorul cu Hotar, Cărbunele, Ștefanu, Mirăuțu, Mierul, Pârâul Stânei, Padina, Pârâul Scurt, Miru, Pârâul Sec, Pârâul Mioarelor, Izvorul Purului, Vidra, Vidruța, Ștelieu, Râmna, Runculeț, Buta, Mănăileasa, Masu, Pârâul Cărării, Lupul, Larga, Prejbuța, Latorița, Mălaia, Bucureasa Mare, Valea Satului, Grotu, Valea Izvorului, Pleștioara, Sturișori, Nicula, Sașa, Sila, Suhăioasa, Valea lui Stan, Mesteacănu, Valea Satului, Valea Seacă and Dăneasa
