= Malaia, Vâlcea =

Malaia
- Commune
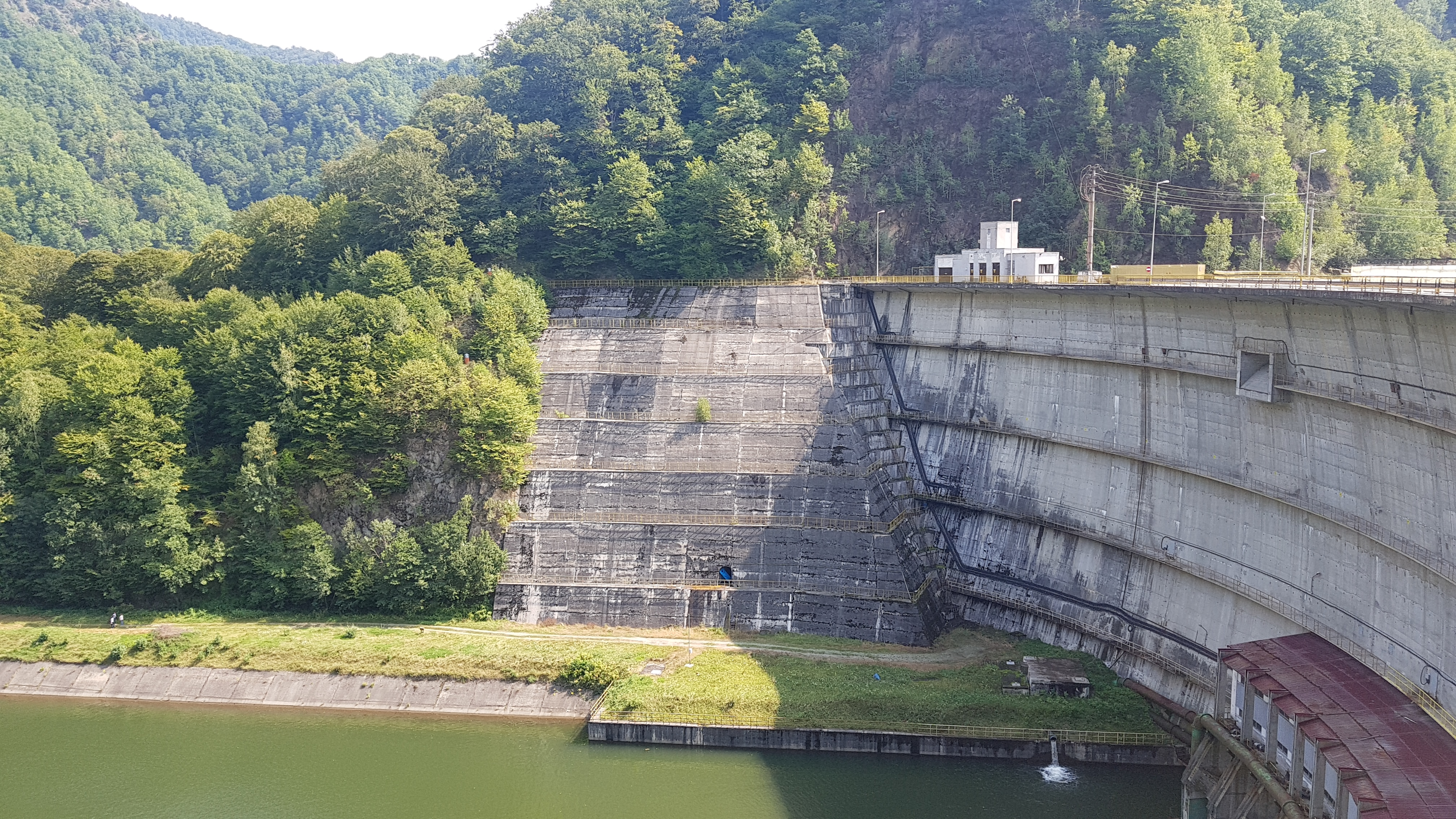
- Dam in Malaia

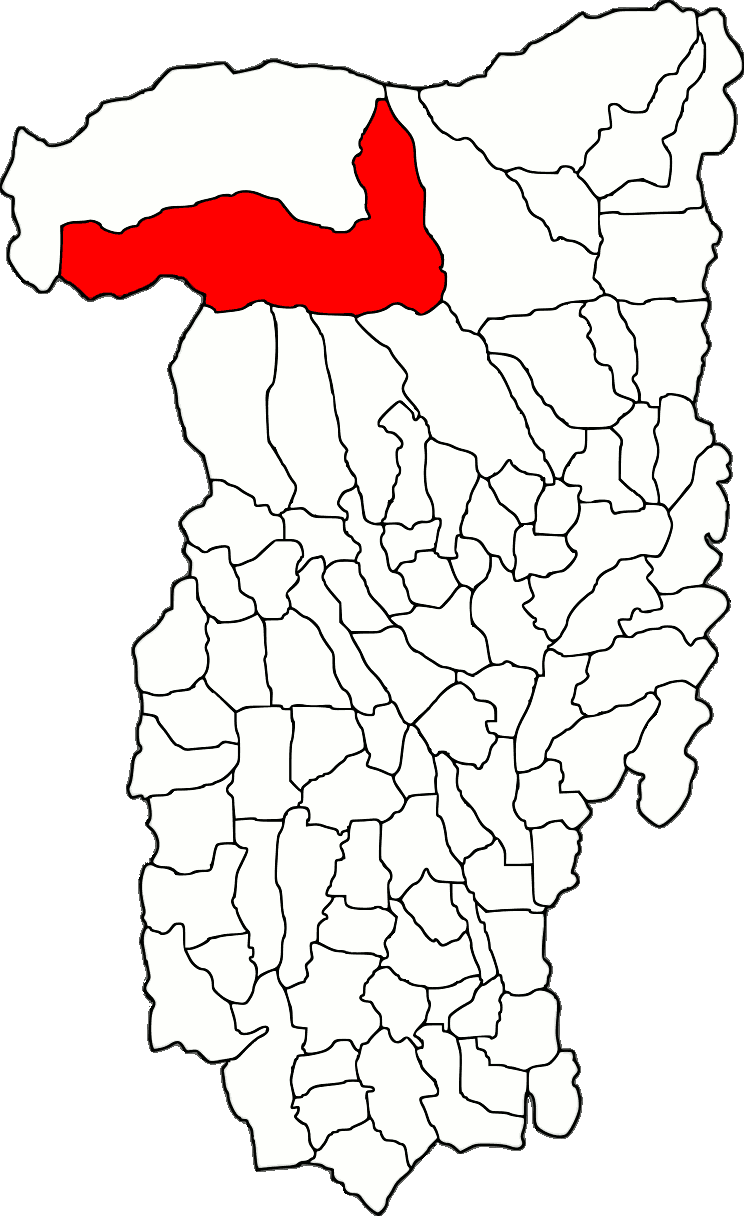
- Location in Vâlcea County

- Location in Romania
- Coordinates: 45°21′N 24°2′E
- Country: Romania
- County: Vâlcea

Government
  - Mayor (2020–2024): Gheorghe Dinculescu (PSD)
- Area: 393.27 km^{2} (151.84 sq mi)
- Elevation: 470 m (1,540 ft)
- Population (2021-12-01): 1,639
  - Density: 4.168/km^{2} (10.79/sq mi)
- Time zone: UTC+02:00 (EET)
  - Summer (DST): UTC+03:00 (EEST)
- Postal code: 247335
- Area code: +(40) 250
- Vehicle reg.: VL
- Website: primariamalaiavl.ro

Malaia is a commune in Vâlcea County, Oltenia, Romania. It is composed of three villages: Malaia, Ciungetu, and Săliștea.

Historical population
Year	Pop.	±%
2002	1,930	—
2011	1,703	−11.8%
2021	1,639	−3.8%
Source: Census data
