= List of open-pit mines =

This is a list of open-pit mines.

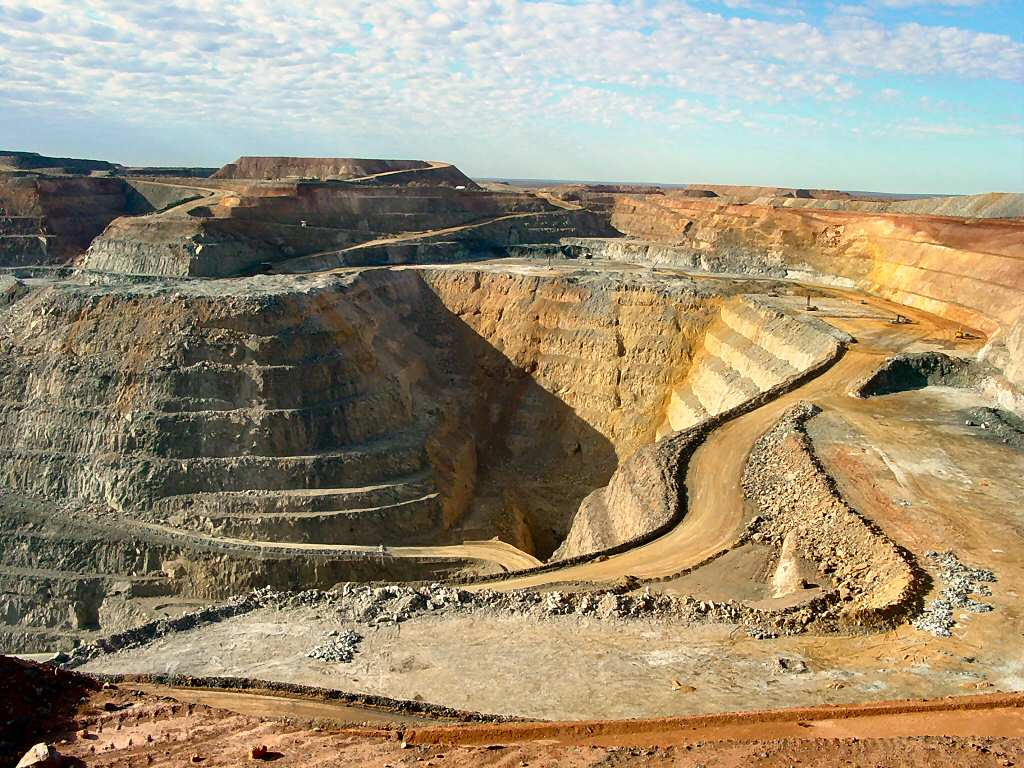
Super Pit gold mine.

== Africa ==
=== Botswana ===
- Jwaneng diamond mine
- Orapa diamond mine
- Damtshaa diamond mine
- Letlhakane diamond mine

=== Egypt ===
- Sukari – gold mine

=== Namibia ===
- Rossing – uranium mine

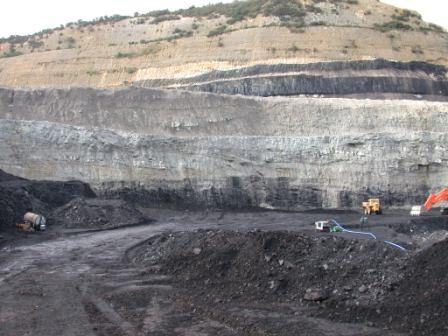
Open Cast Mine, Uncovered Coal Seam, Kai Point Coal Mine, New Zealand

=== South Africa ===
- The Big Hole – a former diamond mine in Kimberley, dug to 240 m (790 ft) between 1871 and 1914, making it the deepest hand-excavated pit in the world. Now a museum.
- The Jagersfontein Mine – operating between 1888 and 1971. This was hand-excavated to 201 m (660 ft) by 1911, and the hand-dug pit was sightly larger than the Big Hole.
- The Palabora Open Pit – mechanically excavated by Palabora Mining Company, in Phalaborwa, Limpopo Province. The pit is 898m deep and 1846m across on top.
- Voorspoed diamond mine

=== Zambia ===
- Nchanga Open Pit Mine, Chingola – the second largest open cast mine in the world, covering nearly 30 km^{2} and up to 400m deep.
- Area j open cast mine, kitwe, copper ores.

== Americas ==
=== Canada ===
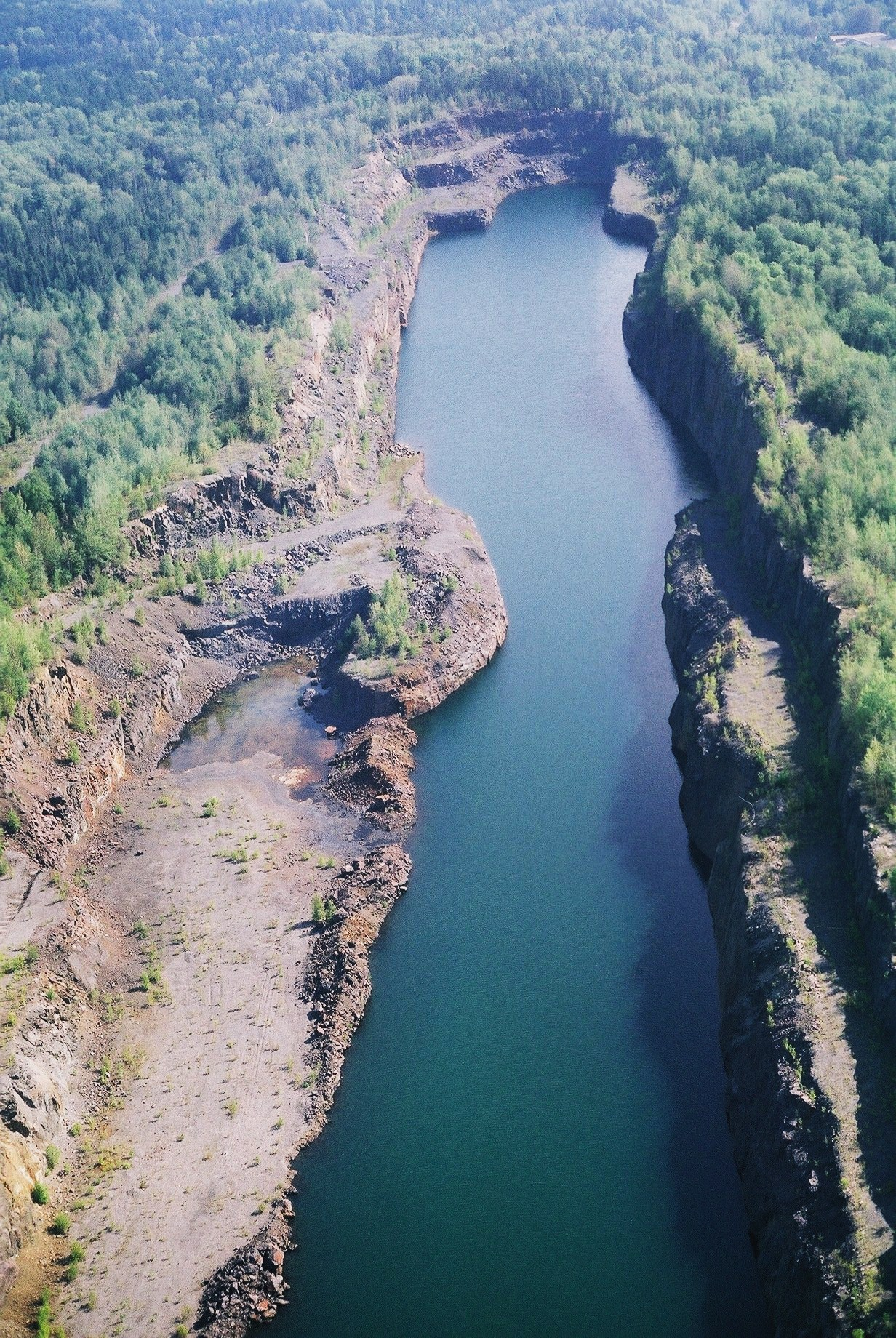
East Pit of Sherman Mine in Temagami, Ontario, Canada

- Adams Mine – abandoned mine in Kirkland Lake, Ontario
- Athabasca oil sands – second largest proven petroleum reserve in the world as of 2013, located in northern Alberta along the Athabasca river.
- Barkerville Mine - Gold Mine near Wells, British Columbia
- Colomac Mine – gold mine in Northwest Territories
- Copperfields Mine, an abandoned base and precious metal mine in Temagami, Ontario
- Copper Mountain Mine – Copper mine South of Princeton, British Columbia
- Detour Lake Gold Mine - Gold mine in Cochrane, Ontario
- Diavik Diamond Mine – diamond mine in Northwest Territories
- Ekati Diamond Mine – diamond mine in Northwest Territories
- Elkview Operations – Coal mine in the Elk Valley of British Columbia
- Fording River – Coal mine in the Elk Valley of British Columbia
- Gibraltar Mine copper mine near Williams Lake, British Columbia
- Greenhills - coal mine in the Elk Valley of British Columbia
- Highland Valley Copper – copper mine in British Columbia
- Jeffrey Mine - abandoned asbestos mine in Val-des-Sources, Quebec
- Kanichee Mine, an abandoned base and precious metal mine in Temagami, Ontario
- Line Creek – Coal Mine in the Elk Valley of British Columbia
- Marmoraton Mine - abandoned Iron ore mine east of Peterborough, Ontario and North of Trenton, Ontario
- Mary River Mine – Iron mine in the Mary River region of Baffin Island, Nunavut
- Mount Milligan – Copper/Gold Mine west of Mackenzie, British Columbia
- Pine Point Mine – lead and zinc mine in Northwest Territories
- Red Chris Mine - Copper/Gold Mine 80km South of Dease Lake, British Columbia
- Sherman Mine – abandoned iron mine in Temagami, Ontario
- Canadian Malartic Mine – among the largest gold mines of Canada

=== Chile ===
- Chuquicamata – copper mine
- Collahuasi – copper mine
- El Abra – copper mine
- Escondida – copper mine
- Los Pelambres – copper mine
- Radomiro Tomic – copper mine

=== Argentina ===
Bajo de la Alumbrera

- Cerro Vanguardia Mine – gold and silver mine located near Puerto San Julián, Santa Cruz
- Pascua Lama – binational gold and silver mine in San Juan, Argentina and Atacama, Chile (in project)

=== Brazil ===
- Carajás mine – iron ore mine in Carajás
- Chapada mine – gold mine in Chapada
- Pitinga mine – tin mine in Pitinga
- Serra Grande Gold Mine – gold mine in Crixás

=== Mexico ===
- Buenavista mine – copper mine in Cananea, Sonora
- La Caridad Mine – copper mine in La Caridad

=== Peru ===
- Toquepala – porphyry copper.
- Yanacocha – gold mine
- Antamina Mine – Polymetallic mine (Copper, Zinc)

=== United States ===
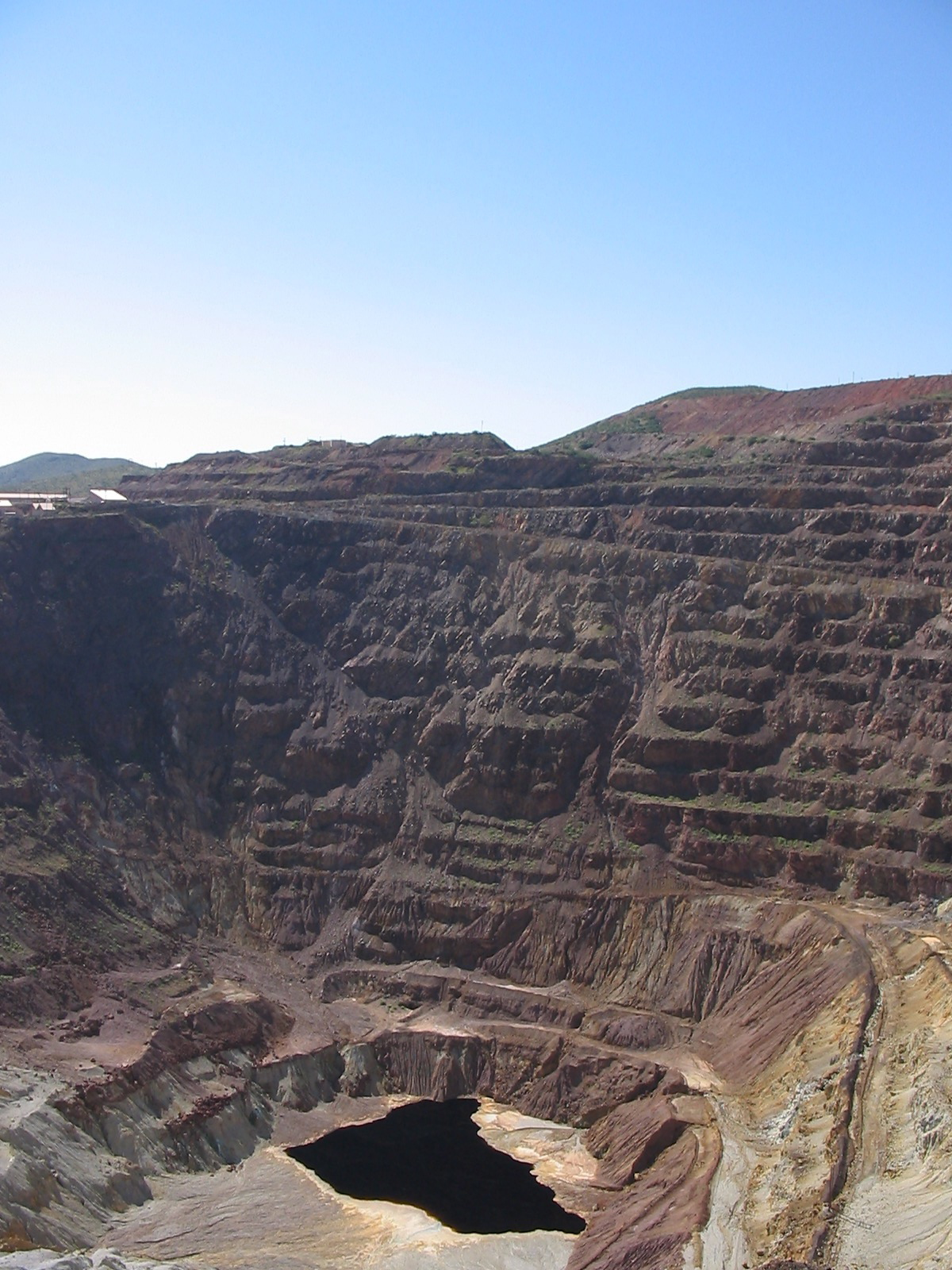
The Lavender Pit, Bisbee, Arizona

- Berkeley Pit – former copper mine in Butte, Montana; now the largest and most expensive Superfund site in history
- Bingham Canyon Mine – copper mine in Salt Lake County, Utah; largest man-made excavation on Earth; more commonly known as Kennecott Copper Mine
- Chino Mine – copper mine in Grant County, New Mexico
- Cresson Mine – gold mine in Victor, Colorado
- Fort Knox mine – gold mine in the Fairbanks mining district of Alaska
- Hull–Rust–Mahoning Open Pit Iron Mine – largest open pit iron mine in the world, near Hibbing, Minnesota
- Lavender Pit – copper mine in Cochise County, Arizona
- Morenci Mine – copper mine in Greenlee County, Arizona
- Mountain Iron Mine – iron mine in Mountain Iron, Minnesota
- Robinson Mine – copper and gold mine in Ruth, Nevada
- New Cornelia mine – inactive copper mine near Ajo, Arizona
- Ray mine – Asarco copper mine located in Pinal county, Arizona
- Red Dog mine – zinc and lead mine in Red Dog Mine, Alaska
- Rio Tinto Borax Mine – California's largest open-pit mine and the largest borax mine in the world
- Thompson Creek mine – molybdenum mine in Custer County, Idaho

== Asia ==
=== India ===
- Hutti – gold mine in Raichur District of Karnataka
- Neyveli Lignite – largest open cast mines in India

Rampura Agucha Mines, Zinc mine in Rajasthan

=== Indonesia ===
- Batu Hijau mine – copper and gold mine on the island of Sumbawa
- Grasberg mine – largest gold and second largest copper mine in the world in Papua province

=== Iran ===
- Gol Gohar mine – the largest iron mine in Iran
- Sarcheshme Copper Mine – copper mine with side production of gold and molybdenum

=== Japan ===
- Hachinohe mine – limestone mine in Hachinohe
- Hanaoka mine – black ore mine in Hanaoka
- Hishikari mine – gold mine in Isa
- Kurokawa gold mine – gold mine in Kōshū
- Matsuo mine – iron and sulphur mine in Matsuo
- Naganobori Copper Mine – copper mine in Mine, Yamaguchi

=== Kazakhstan ===
- Aktogay mine – large molybdenum mine in Aktogay
- Bozshakol mine – large copper mine in Bozshakol

=== Kyrgyzstan ===
- Kumtor Gold Mine – gold mine in Tian Shan Mountains at 4,000-4,400 m (14,000 ft) above sea level

=== Mongolia ===
- Boroo Gold Mine – gold mine 110 km (70 mi) WNW of the capital Ulan Bator

== Europe ==
=== Bosnia and Herzegovina ===
- Gacko coal mine – lignite mine
- Stanari coal mine – lignite mine
- Ugljevik coal mine – lignite mine

=== Bulgaria ===
- Maritsa Iztok Mines – coal mine near Radnevo, Stara Zagora Province, Bulgaria

=== Finland ===
- Kevitsa mine – large nickel-copper mine in Sodankylä, Lapland

=== Germany ===
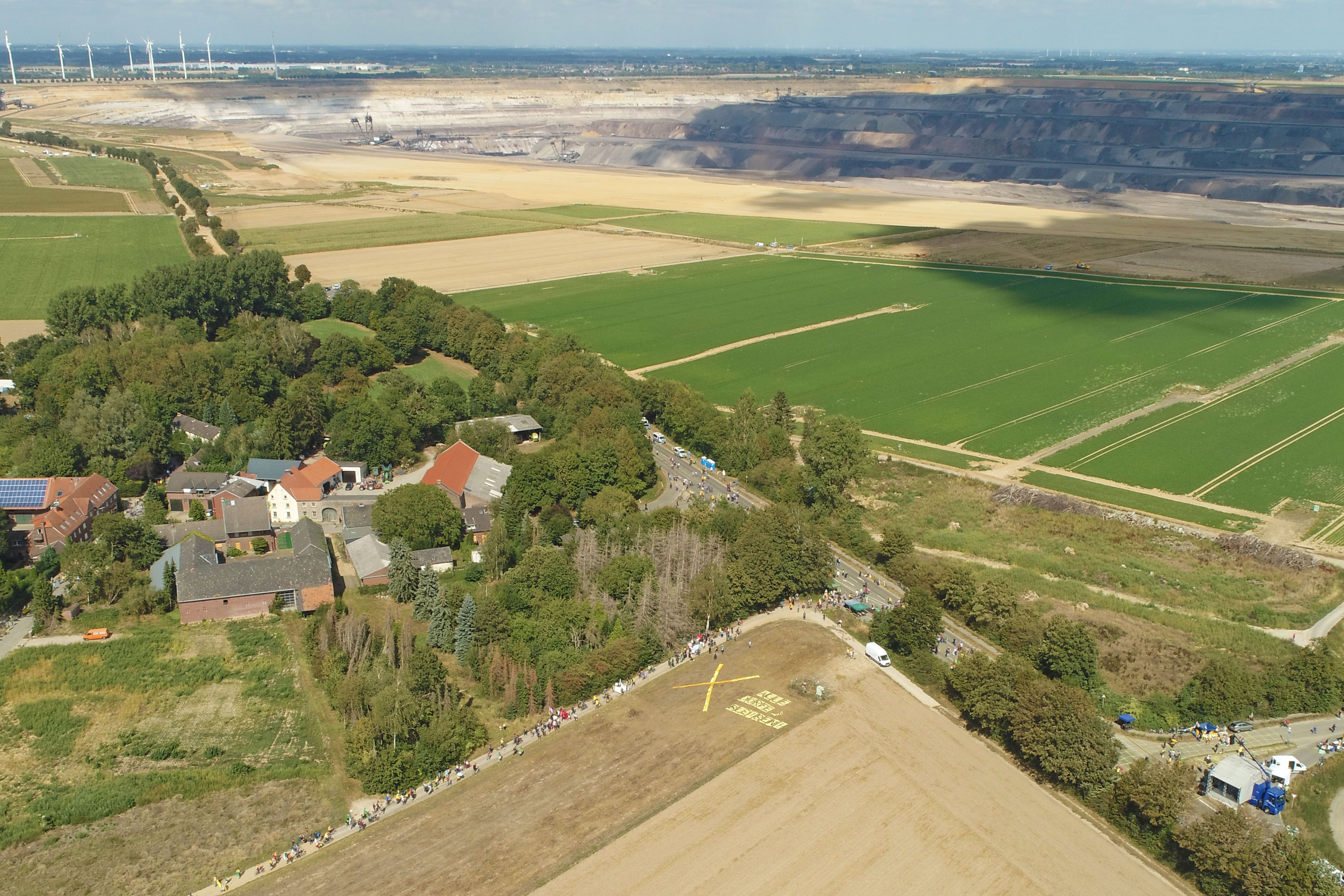
Lignite mine in the background of Lützerath, Germany

- Tagebau Garzweiler – lignite mine
- Tagebau Hambach – lignite mine
- Tagebau Inden – lignite mine

=== Kosovo ===
- Sibovc Coal Mine – coal mine (lignite)

=== Montenegro ===
- Pljevlja coal mine – coal mine (lignite)

=== North Macedonia ===
- Brod-Gneotino coal mine – coal mine (lignite)
- Suvodol coal mine – coal mine (lignite)

=== Poland ===
- Adamów Coal Mine – coal mine (lignite)
- Bełchatów Coal Mine – coal mine (lignite)
- Konin Coal Mine – coal mine (lignite)
- Turów Coal Mine – coal mine (lignite)

=== Portugal ===
- Sao Domingos Mine – copper mine

=== Romania ===
- Berbeşti Coal Mine – coal mine
- Motru Coal Mine – coal mine
- Roșia Poieni copper mine
- Rovinari Coal Mine – coal mine

=== Russia ===
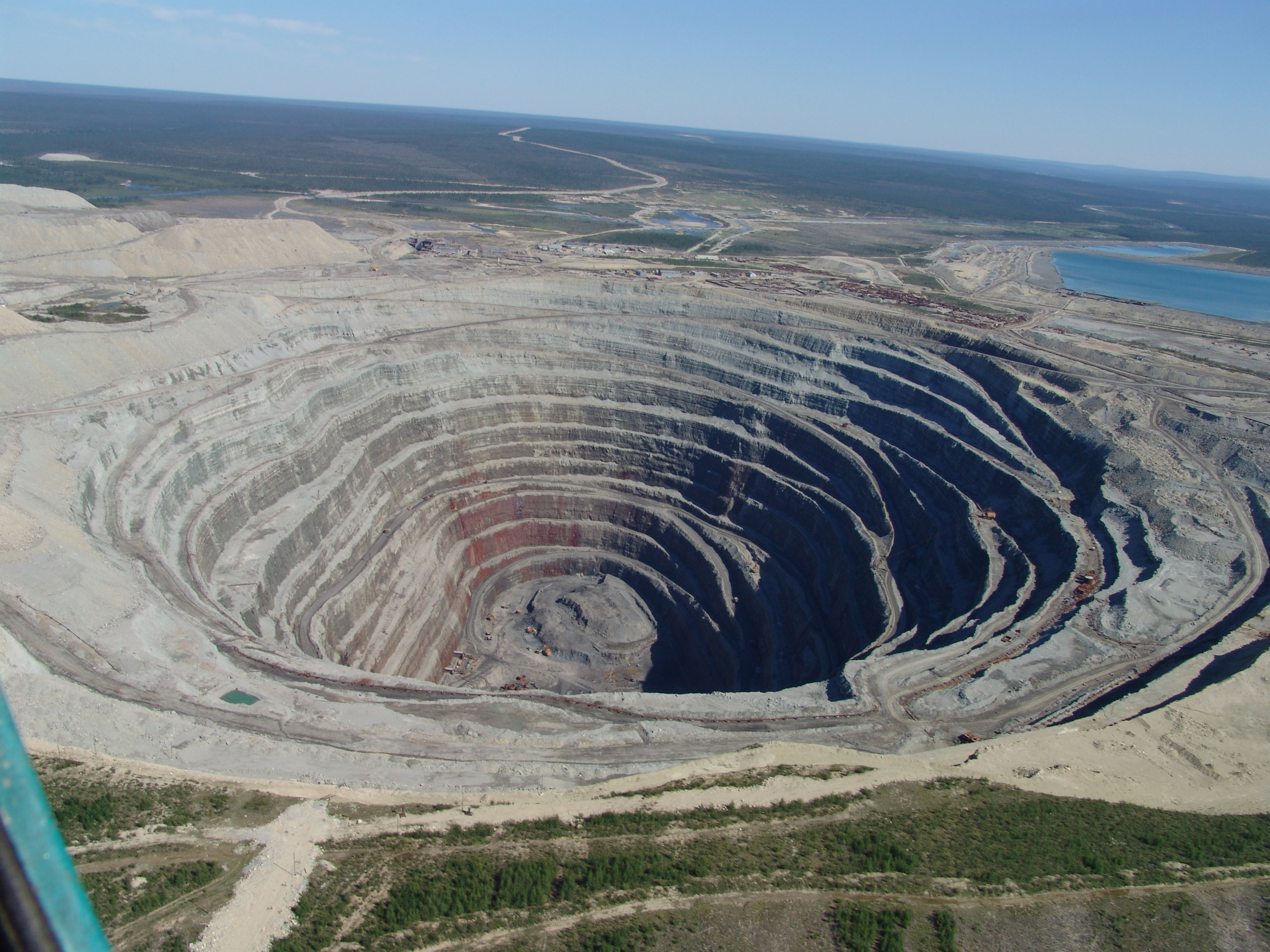
The Udachnaya pipe in Mirninsky District, Sakha Republic, Russia

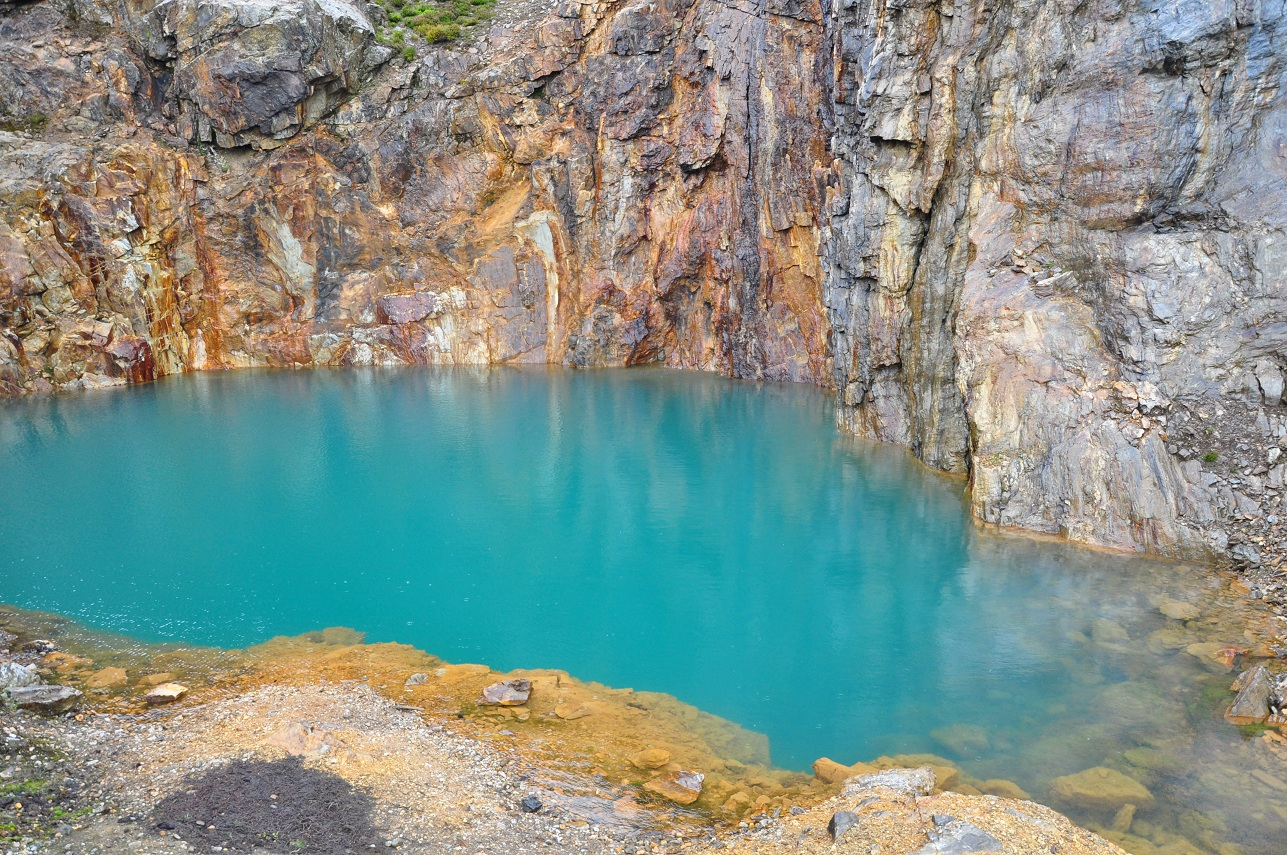
Abandoned baryte mine shaft in Perthshire, Scotland; an example of small scale open pit mining

- Mirny Mine – diamond mine in Mirny, Eastern Siberia
- Udachnaya pipe – diamond mine in Yakutia, Russia

=== Serbia ===
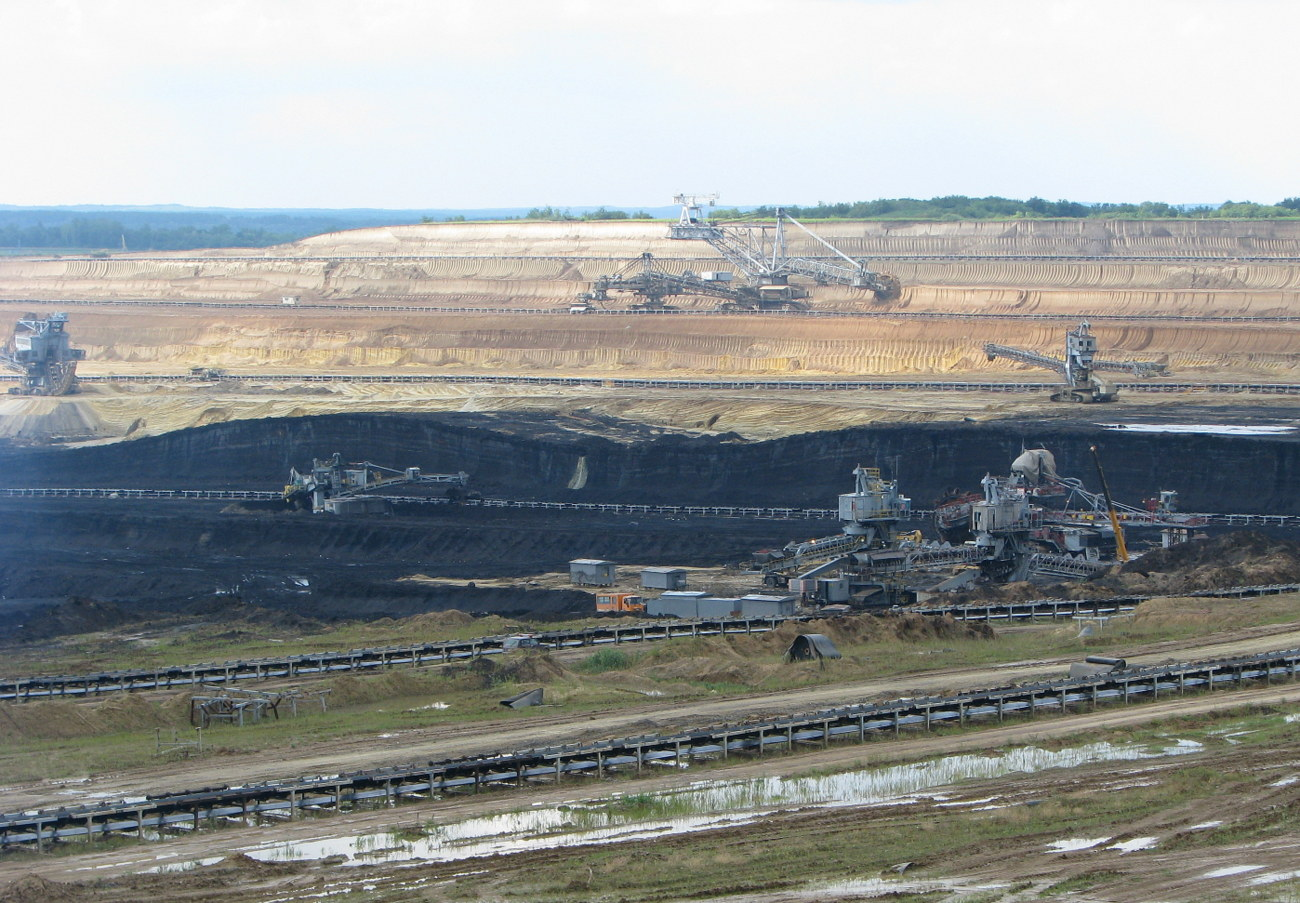
Kostolac coal basin near Drmno, Serbia

- Bor mine – copper and gold
- Kolubara – coal mine (lignite)
- Kostolac – coal mine (lignite)
- Majdanpek mine – copper and gold

=== Spain ===
- Corta Atalaya – the largest open-pit mine in Europe and was at one time the largest in the world.
- Sierra Menera – Sistema Ibérico

=== Sweden ===
- Aitik-gruvan in Gällivare – copper mine with side production of gold and molybdenum

=== United Kingdom ===
- Ffos-y-fran Land Reclamation Scheme – coal mine in Wales
- Penrhyn Quarry – slate quarry in Wales
- Halton Lea Gate near Lambley, Northumberland – coal mine (given planning approval 2014)

== Oceania ==
=== Australia ===
- Boddington Gold Mine – gold and copper mine near Boddington, Western Australia
- Cadia Mine – gold and copper mine located near Orange, New South Wales
- Challenger Mine – gold mine near Coober Pedy, South Australia
- Hunter Valley Operations – metallurgic and thermal coal mine near Singleton, New South Wales
- McArthur River Mine – zinc, lead and silver mine southwest of Borroloola, Northern Territory
- Prominent Hill mine – copper mine near Coober Pedy, South Australia
- Ranger Mine – uranium mine east of Darwin, Northern Territory
- Sunrise Dam gold mine – gold mine near Laverton, Western Australia
- Super Pit – gold mine near Kalgoorlie, Western Australia
- Telfer Mine – gold and copper mine in the Pilbara, Western Australia
- Peak Downs Mine – coking coal mine near Moranbah, Queensland
- Goonyella Riverside Mine – metallurgical coking coal near Moranbah, Queensland

=== New Zealand ===
- Macraes Mine – gold mine in Central Otago
- Martha Mine – gold mine in Waihi

=== Papua New Guinea ===
- Panguna mine – copper mine in Bougainville Province

== See also ==
- Mining – Extraction of valuable minerals or other geological materials from the Earth
- Open-pit mining – Surface mining technique
