= National Company of Lignite Oltenia =

- Company type: Public
- Industry: Coal
- Founded: 1997
- Headquarters: Târgu Jiu, Romania
- Key people: Eugen Davidoiu, CEO
- Products: Lignite
- Revenue: US$503 million (2007)
- Number of employees: 8,765 (2007)
- Website: http://www.cnlo.ro/

National Company of Lignite Oltenia (Romanian: Societatea Naţională a Lignitului Oltenia - SNLO) Târgu Jiu was set up as a commercial society by the Government of Romania in 1997. The main headquarters of the company is placed in Târgu Jiu, Gorj County.
The company has its material base in Gorj, Vâlcea and Mehedinți with total reserves of 2 billion tonnes of coal.

The annual production is around 35 million tonnes of lignite and 4 million tonnes of anthracite and the total number of employees is around 9,000.

Around 85% of the total production comes from Gorj County, particularly from the northern areas where coal is extracted near Motru and Rovinari.

The main beneficiaries of the coal extracted here are the great Romanian power complexes Rovinari Power Station with a capacity of 1,320 MW, Turceni Power Station with a capacity of 1,650 MW and Craiova Power Station with a capacity of 615 MW thus making Gorj County the biggest power producer in Romania with around 36% of the whole energy produced in the country.

== Coal mines ==
The National Company of Lignite Oltenia owns and operates a number of six coal mines located in Gorj, Mehedinți and Vâlcea counties.

Rank	Mine	County	Reserves (million tonnes)	Production (million tonnes)
1	Berbești	Vâlcea	67	2.5
2	Husnicioara	Mehedinți	67	3.1
3	Jilț	Gorj	285.8	7
4	Motru	Gorj	108	6.6
5	Roșia – Peșteana	Gorj	112	7.2
6	Rovinari	Gorj	180	8
