= Roșia – Peșteana Coal Mine =

Coal mine in Gorj County, Romania

Roșia - Peșteana Coal mine
- Location: Rovinari, Gorj County, Romania
- Products: Coal
- Production: 7,200,000 tonnes
- Financial year: 2008
- Opened: 1973
- Company: National Company of Lignite Oltenia

Roșia – Peșteana Coal Mine is an open-pit mining exploitation, one of the largest in Romania located in Rovinari, Gorj County. The legal entity managing the Roșia - Peșteana mine is the National Company of Lignite Oltenia which was set up in 1997.

The exploitation has three open pits Roșia, Peșteana Nord, Peșteana Sud-Urdar that produced 7.2 million tonnes of lignite in 2008. The mine has around 2,900 workers and is endowed with 19 bucket-wheel excavators, 12 spreaders, one mixed machine and three deposits spreader. The total proven recoverable reserves of the mine amount to 112 million tonnes of lignite.
