= Berbești =

- Town
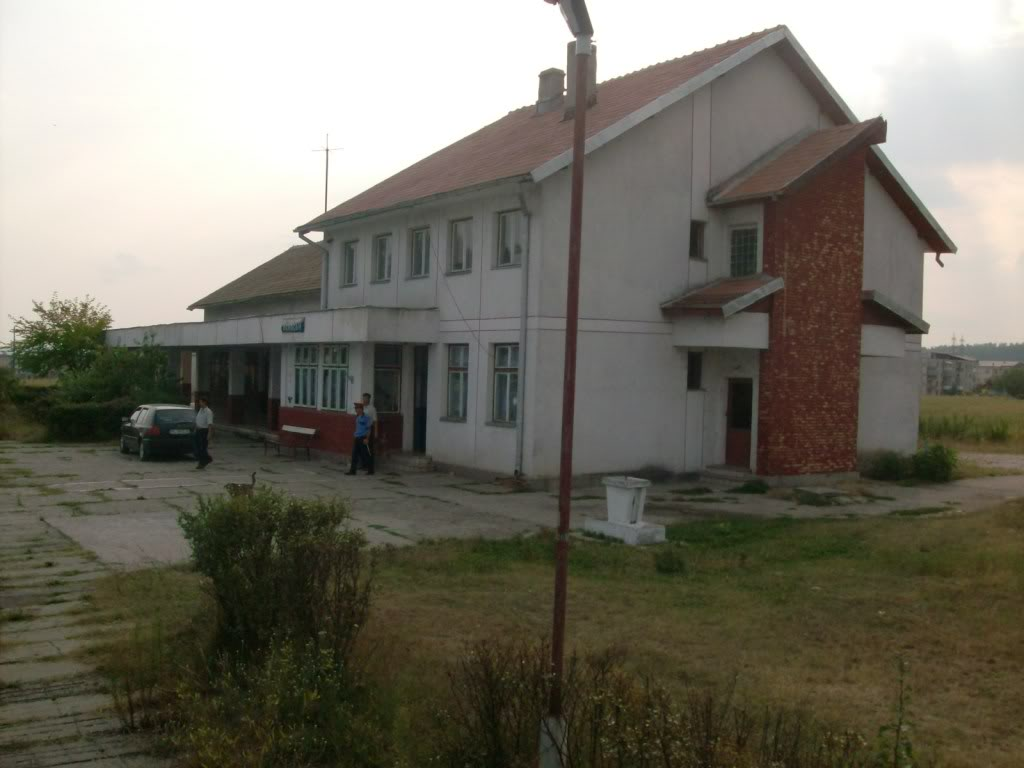
- The Berbești train station

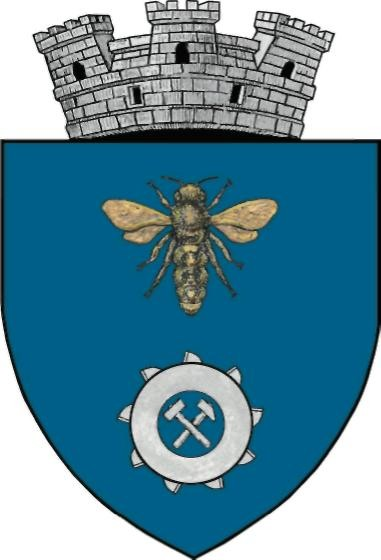
- Coat of arms

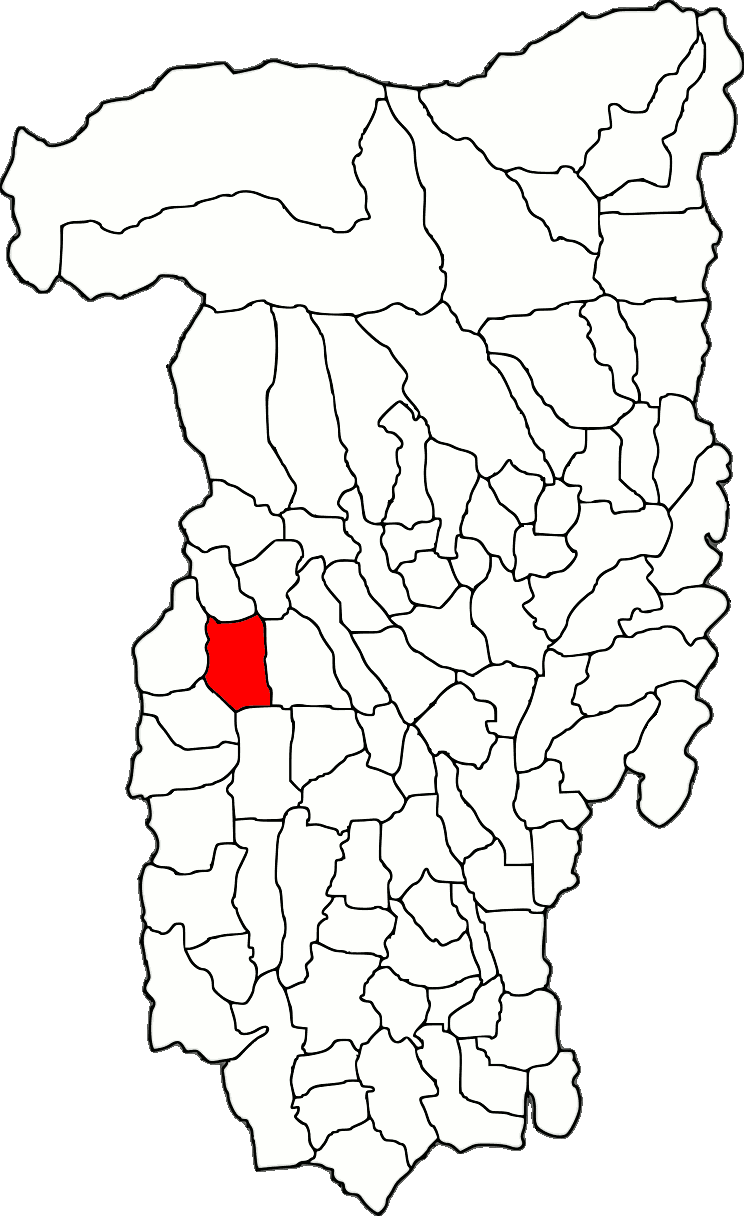
- Location in Vâlcea County

- Location in Romania
- Coordinates: 44°59′17″N 23°52′6″E
- Country: Romania
- County: Vâlcea

Government
  - Mayor (2024–2028): Petre Glomnicu (PSD)
- Area: 54.34 km^{2} (20.98 sq mi)
- Elevation: 350 m (1,150 ft)
- Population (2021-12-01): 4,231
  - Density: 77.86/km^{2} (201.7/sq mi)
- Time zone: UTC+02:00 (EET)
  - Summer (DST): UTC+03:00 (EEST)
- Postal code: 247030
- Area code: (+40) 0250
- Vehicle reg.: VL
- Website: primaria-berbesti.ro

Berbești is a town located in Vâlcea County, Romania, about 78 km (48 mi) south-west from the county seat, Râmnicu Vâlcea, in the historical region of Oltenia. It was granted town status by law in October 2003. As of the 2021 census, it has a population of 4,231.

The town administers five villages: Dămțeni, Dealu Aluniș, Roșioara, Târgu Gângulești, and Valea Mare.

== Geography and climate ==
Set on the lower course of the river Tărâia, a tributary of the Olteț, Berbești is crossed by the 45th parallel north.

Berbești is bordered by Mateești commune to the north, Sinești commune to the south, Alunu to the west and Copăceni to the east.

== Economy ==
The main economic activity is coal mining that began in the 1970s. Following the economic reforms in the late 1990s, Berbești saw an economic downturn similar to most of the mono-industrial towns in Romania.

== Natives ==
Historical population
Year	Pop.	±%
2002	5,704	—
2011	4,591	−19.5%
2021	4,231	−7.8%
Source: Census data

- Valerian Gârlă (born 1986), footballer

== Notes ==
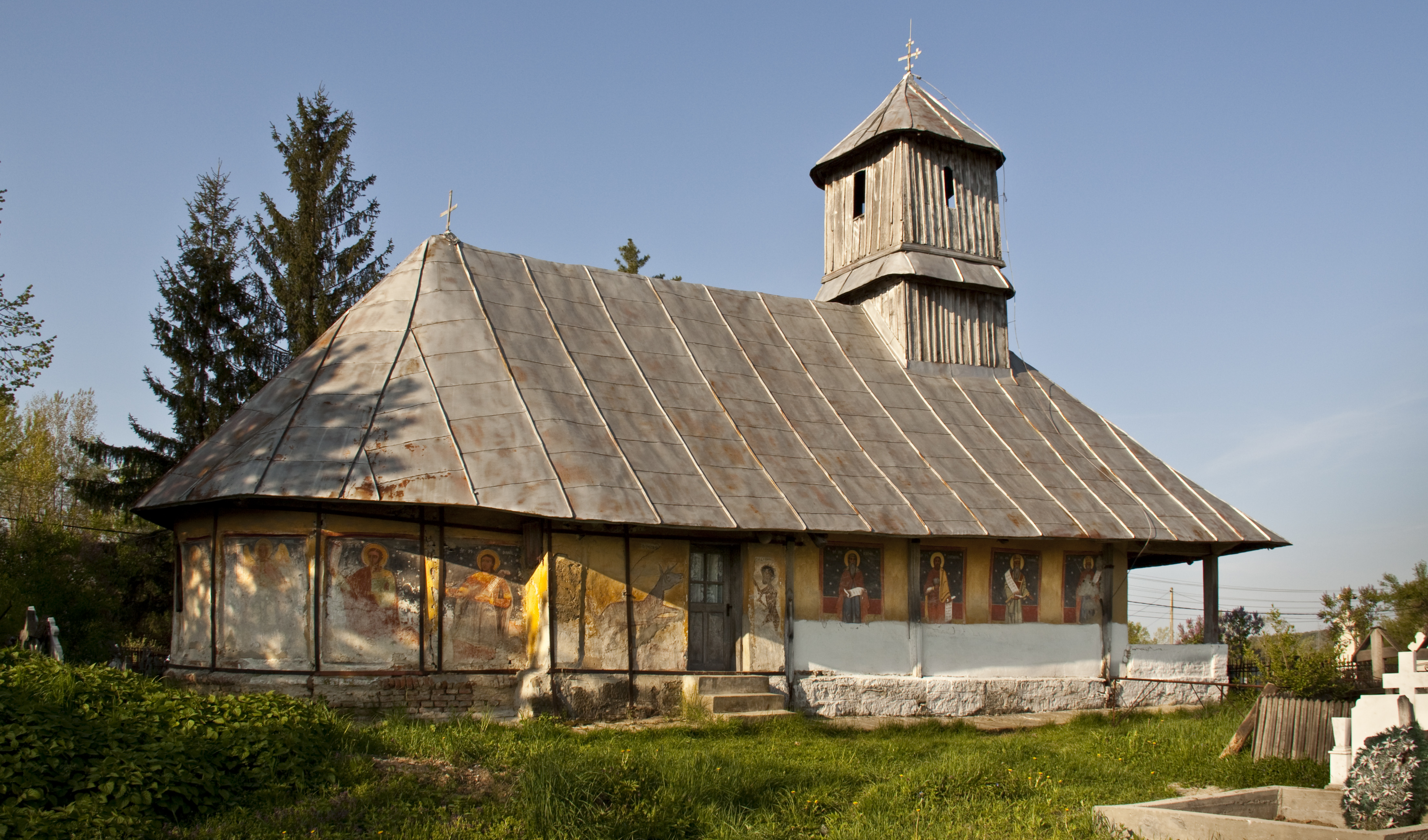
Wooden church in Dămțeni

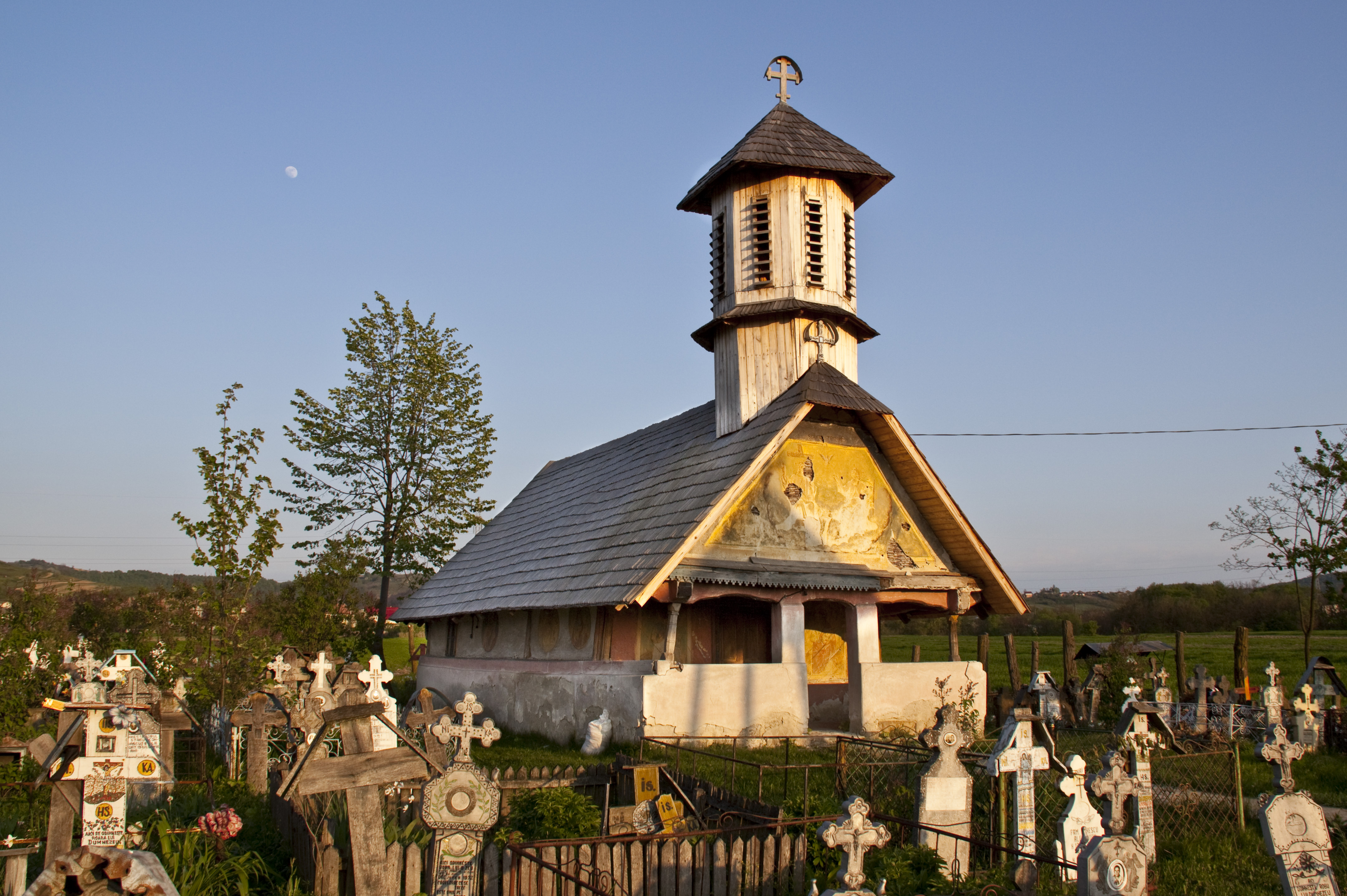
Wooden church in Târgu Gângulești

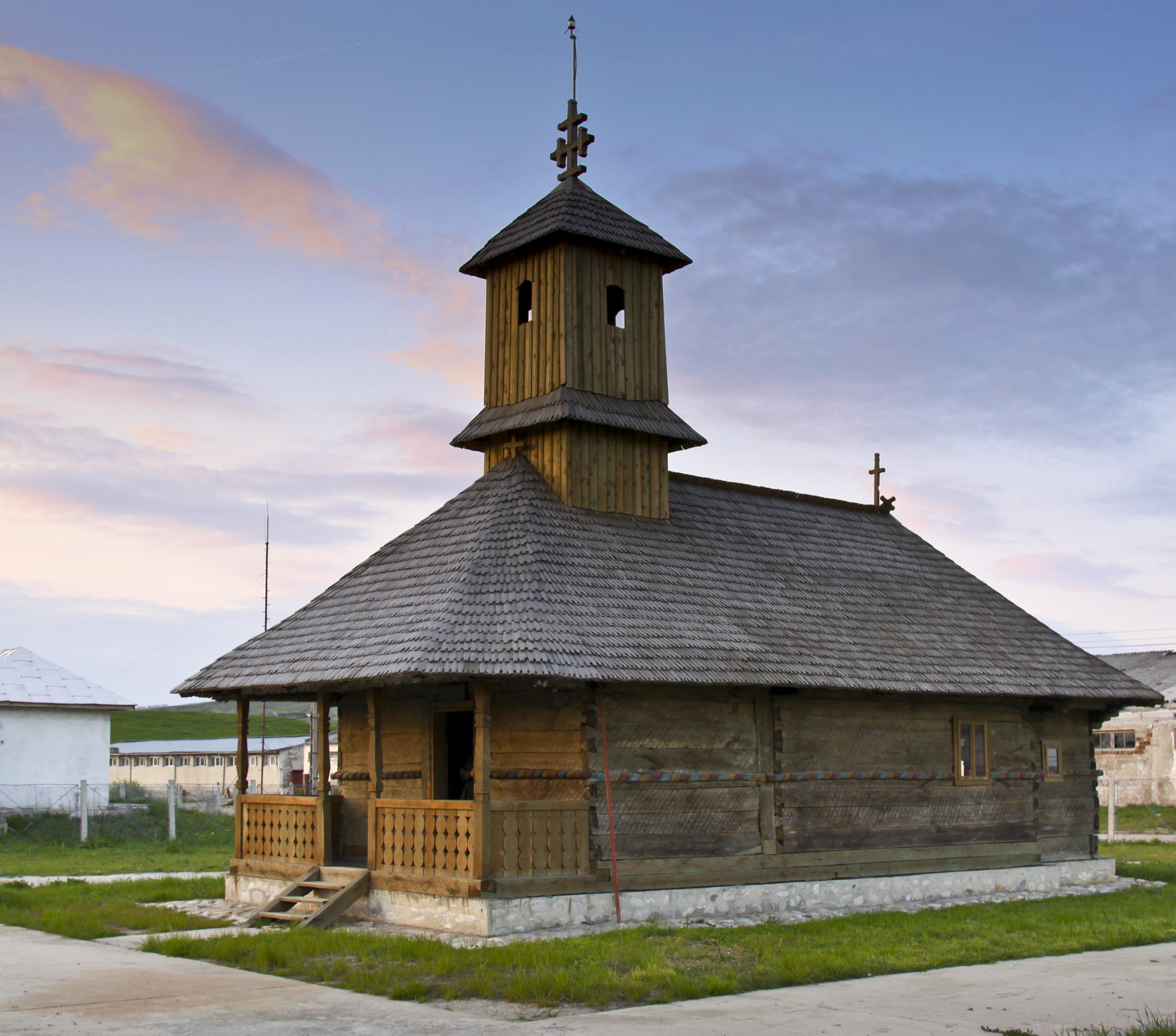
Wooden church in Valea Mare
