= Filofteia Lăcătușu =

- Born: Filofteia Daju; 7 June 1947; Dealu Roșu, Alunu, Vâlcea County, Romania
- Died: 4 March 1977 (aged 29) Bucharest, Romania
- Genre: Romanian folk music
- Occupation: Singer
- Years active: 1961–1977
- Label: Electrecord

Filofteia Lăcătușu (7 June 1947 – 4 March 1977), born Filofteia Daju, was a Romanian folk singer from Oltenia, best known for her repertoire of traditional songs from the Gorj region.

She was a soloist with the Doina Gorjului folk ensemble from 1969 until her death at the age of 29 during the 1977 Vrancea earthquake.

== Biography ==
Filofteia Daju was born on 7 June 1947 in the village of Dealu Roșu, part of the commune of Alunu, in Vâlcea County, Romania.

She became interested in traditional music during childhood, singing alongside her grandfather, Vasile Gogenete. At the age of 14, after completing her education at the school in Alunu, she joined a group of traditional musicians led by Nelică Popescu.

Her repertoire included ballads, doinas, and traditional songs learned from her grandfather, her father Victor Daju, and Popescu himself. Among her principal musical influences was the singer Maria Lătărețu, whose songs she frequently performed.

Her professional career took a significant turn thanks to conductor Gelu Barabancea, who noticed her during a performance by the Doina Gorjului ensemble in Râmnicu Vâlcea. In December 1969, she became a permanent member of the ensemble, based in Târgu Jiu.

She remained with the ensemble until 1977, performing under the direction of Gelu Barabancea and, subsequently, Stelian Ghiocel. She participated in numerous concerts and tours both in Romania and abroad.

Her repertoire, closely associated with the musical traditions of Gorj, included numerous folk songs, such as Lung e drumul Gorjului, Jiule, pe malul tău, Gorjule, plai însorit, Am auzit o minciună, Lume, lume mi-ai fost dragă, Am plâns neicuță de dor, De dragul gorjenilor, Gilortule, apă rece, Dragoste ce ai de gând, De ce neică m-ai lăsat, Cine-n lume a iubit, Neică, plaiul tău gorjean, Cine m-aude cântând, Dor pribeag de unde vii, and Ascultă, gorjanule.

== Death ==
On 4 March 1977, Filofteia Lăcătușu travelled to Bucharest with her partner Gicu Simu, intending to make new recordings for the record company Electrecord. She was scheduled to record a third album the following day.

The singer was staying at the Victoria Hotel, where she had arrived shortly before 9:00 p.m. At 9:22 p.m., a powerful earthquake struck Romania, causing the building in which she was staying to collapse.

Lăcătușu and Gicu Simu were killed in the collapse.

The singer was 29 years old. She was buried on 8 March 1977, alongside Gicu Simu, in the cemetery of the village of Suseni, in the commune of Runcu, Gorj County.

== Discography ==
Filofteia Lăcătușu's recordings were made primarily between 1970 and 1977 for Electrecord, Romanian television, and Romanian radio.

In 1970, she recorded some of her earliest songs accompanied by the Doina Gorjului orchestra, conducted by Gelu Barabancea. These included Neică, plaiul tău gorjean, Am primit de la neicuța vești, and Și de-o fi cândva să mor.

In 1975, she released the album Jiule, pe malul tău through Electrecord. The album contained eleven tracks, including Ascultă, gorjanule, Am auzit o minciună, Măi neicuță, nu uita, and Gorjule, iubitul meu.

== Legacy ==
Since 2013, a national children's folk music festival dedicated to the singer's memory, the Festivalul Național de Folclor al Copiilor "Filofteia Lăcătușu", has been held in Horezu, Romania.

== See also ==
- Maria Lătărețu
- Maria Ciobanu
- 1977 Vrancea earthquake
