= Turcești =

Turceşti may refer to several villages in Romania:

- Turceşti, a village in Săpata Commune, Argeș County
- Turceşti, a village in Mateești Commune, Vâlcea County
