= Jilț Coal Mine =

Coal mine in Romania

Jilț Coal mine
- Location: Mătăsari, Gorj County, Romania
- Products: Coal
- Production: 7,000,000 tonnes
- Financial year: 2008
- Opened: 1984
- Company: National Company of Lignite Oltenia

Jilț Coal Mine is an open-pit mining exploitation, one of the largest in Romania located in Mătăsari, Gorj County. The legal entity managing the Jilț mine is the National Company of Lignite Oltenia which was set up in 1997.

The exploitation has two open pits Jilț Sud, Jilț Nord that produced 7 million tonnes of lignite in 2008. The mine has around 2,400 workers and is endowed with 15 bucket-wheel excavators, seven spreaders, two mixed machines and one deposit spreader. The total proven recoverable reserves of the mine amount to 285.8 million tonnes of lignite.
