= Tărâia =

Tărâia Târâia
- Location within Romania

Location
- Country: Romania
- Counties: Gorj, Vâlcea
- Villages: Polovragi, Mateești, Berbești

Physical characteristics
- Mouth: Olteț
  - coordinates: 44.9714°N 23.8212°E
- Length: 40 km (25 mi)
- Basin size: 137 km^{2} (53 sq mi)

Basin features
- Progression: Olteț→ Olt→ Danube→ Black Sea
- Tributaries
  - left: Valea Verde, Porcu
  - right: Valea Seacă

The Tărâia (also: Târâia) is a left tributary of the river Olteț in Romania. It discharges into the Olteț in Ocracu. Its length is 40 km (25 mi) and its basin size is 137 km^{2} (53 sq mi).
