= Husnicioara Coal Mine =

Open-pit mine in Romania

Husnicioara Coal mine
- Location within Romania
- Location: Husnicioara, Mehedinți County, Romania; 44°40′41.02″N 22°50′33″E
- Products: Coal
- Production: 3,100,000 tonnes
- Financial year: 2008
- Opened: 1980
- Company: National Company of Lignite Oltenia

Husnicioara Coal Mine is an open-pit mining exploitation, one of the largest in Romania located in Husnicioara, Mehedinți County. The legal entity managing the Husnicioara mine is the National Company of Lignite Oltenia which was set up in 1997.

The exploitation has two open pits Husnicioara - Vest, Zegujani that produced 3.1 million tonnes of lignite in 2008. The mine has around 700 workers and is endowed with five bucket-wheel excavators, three spreaders, one mixed machine and four deposits spreader. The total proven recoverable reserves of the mine amount to 67 million tonnes of lignite.
