= Berbești Coal Mine =

Coal mine in Romania

Berbești Coal mine
Location
- Location: Berbești, Vâlcea County, Romania

Production
- Products: Coal
- Production: 2,500,000 tonnes
- Financial year: 2008

History
- Opened: 1980

Owner
- Company: National Company of Lignite Oltenia

Berbești Coal Mine is an open-pit mining exploitation, one of the largest in Romania located in Berbești, Vâlcea County. The legal entity managing the Berbești mine is the National Company of Lignite Oltenia which was set up in 1997.

The exploitation has four open pits Seciuri, Olteț, Berbești-Vest, Panga that produced 2.5 million tonnes of lignite in 2008. The mine has around 1,800 workers and is endowed with 13 bucket-wheel excavators, seven spreaders, one mixed machine and five deposits spreader. The total proven recoverable reserves of the mine amount to 67 million tonnes of lignite.
