= Rovinari Coal Mine =

Coal mine in Gorj County, Romania

Rovinari Coal mine
- Location within Romania
- Location: Rovinari, Gorj County, Romania; 44°54′38.28″N 23°8′5.11″E
- Products: Coal
- Production: 8,000,000 tonnes
- Financial year: 2008
- Opened: 1978
- Company: National Company of Lignite Oltenia

Rovinari Coal Mine is an open-pit mining exploitation, the largest in Romania, located in Rovinari, Gorj County. The legal entity managing the Rovinari mine is the National Company of Lignite Oltenia which was set up in 1997.

== Description ==
The exploitation has four open pits Tismana I, Tismana II, Gârla - Rovinari Est and Pinoasa that produced 8 million tonnes of lignite in 2008. The mine has around 3,000 workers and is endowed with 23 bucket-wheel excavators, 14 spreaders, three mixed machines and one deposits spreader. The total proven recoverable reserves of the mine amount to 610 million tonnes of lignite.

Oltenia Energy Complex was established on May 31, 2012, following the decision of the Romanian Government to reorganize the power sector, by the merger of Societatea Nationala a Lignitului Oltenia and the three power generation companies (Complexul Energetic Rovinari, Complexul Energetic Turceni and Complexul Energetic Craiova). 11 power units with an installed capacity of 3,240 MW one of which: Rovinari Power Plant has four 330 MW lignite-fired condensation power units. It has three functional units: 3, 4 and 6; unit 5 undergoing modernisation.

=== 2014 to Present ===
In 2014, Oltenia Energy Complex (OEC), revealed that plans had been put on hold, just days after an agreement for the joint venture to implement the project had been concluded. Reports cited questions over the profitability of the proposed venture, and whether it would even be possible to recover the one billion Euro investment and production costs. The OEC responded that it would conduct a feasibility study.

In April 2017, in a sign that the project was again moving forward, the CHEC and OEC announced the establishment of a joint venture company, Huadian Oltenia Energy SA, in which Huadian is the majority shareholder with 91.06 percent. In August that year, the Romanian Ministry of Energy announced that it had officially resumed talks with CHEC for construction of the new power plant.

Analysts say that given current plans it is conceivable that up to 3.5 GW of coal plant capacity could go online in southeast Europe with Chinese financial support in the coming years. Consider that the massive Rovinari project, which could supply up to five percent of Romania's energy needs, will have a lifespan of up to 40 years, and will not begin sending electricity to the grid until at the earliest 2023. That commits Romania to the operation of the plant up to 2063.

According to the Energy Strategy of Romania for the period 2019 – 2030, realization of the 600 MW energy group at the Rovinari Power Plant is considered a strategic investment of national interest, in order to consolidate the national energy market and the diversified energy mix, by capitalizing on the primary energy resources and stimulating domestic investment to provide equipment and materials.

The new group will be a high-performance generation unit, the facility being provided with the best available techniques for reducing particulate matter, NOx and SO2 emissions, with the possibility of adding CO_{2} capture, transport and geological storage technology, to comply with the regulations in force and to meet the requirements for limiting the emissions of pollutants.

The energy group will use about 5 million tons of lignite annually and will generate about 4,000 jobs during the implementation of the project. The investment was estimated at EUR 1 billion.

Negotiations are currently under way to conclude the superficies and coal supply agreements, which are priorities for this year.

== Concerns ==
If the project went ahead, the new unit would be located next to the town of Rovinari, increasing existing air pollution levels from the other 4 units. The lignite would be supplied from the nearby open-pit mines – Tismana I and II, Rosia, Pinoasa, all owned by the same Oltenia Energy Complex – which would require expansion of production capacity. Extending these mines would mean clearing huge land areas, in most cases accompanied by massive deforestation.

Environmental concerns are related to EU Directive 2011/92/EU on environmental impact assessment makes licensing coal plants more complicated than before, as the project's impact on climate and the vulnerability of the project to climate change must be explicitly considered in the environmental impact assessment.

Economical concerns are that the project would likely have difficulties in meeting the project's debt service requirements as the organic cash flow generation would be limited and not sufficient under current energy market prices.

== Health Issues ==
According to the Europe Beyond Coal NGO, Rovinari ranks 33 among the deadliest coal power plants in the European Union. The NGO attributed 142 premature deaths in the region in 2015 to the pollution emitted by the power plant. In 2016 there were 326 cases of bronchitis, 14.989 asthma attacks in children, 504 hospital admissions, 170793 lost working days, 1.9 millions EUR health costs.

== Legal Charges ==
Two environmental advocacy groups, Greenpeace Romania and ClientEarth submitted a legal challenge in May 2019 against the permit for Rovinari. The permit was granted in September 2018, nearly a year after its previous permit expired.
