= Motru Coal Mine =

Coal mine in Gorj County, Romania

Berbești Coal mine
- Location: Motru, Gorj County, Romania
- Products: Coal
- Production: 6,600,000 tonnes
- Financial year: 2008
- Opened: 1960
- Company: National Company of Lignite Oltenia

Motru Coal Mine is an open-pit mining exploitation, one of the largest in Romania located in Motru, Gorj County. The legal entity managing the Motru mine is the National Company of Lignite Oltenia which was set up in 1997.The legal entity managing the Motru mine is the National Company of Lignite Oltenia which was set up in 1997.

The first mining works in the Motru basin began in Horăști and Leurda in 1960, followed by the Ploștina mine in 1961, the Lupoaia mine in 1967, the Roșiuța mine in 1968 and the Motru-West mine in 1976.

The exploitation has two open pits Lupoaia and Roșiuța that produced 6.6 million tonnes of lignite in 2008. The mine has around 2,300 workers and is endowed with 13 bucket-wheel excavators, seven spreaders, two mixed machines and two deposits spreader. The total proven recoverable reserves of the mine amount to 108 million tonnes of lignite.
