= Mateești =

- Commune
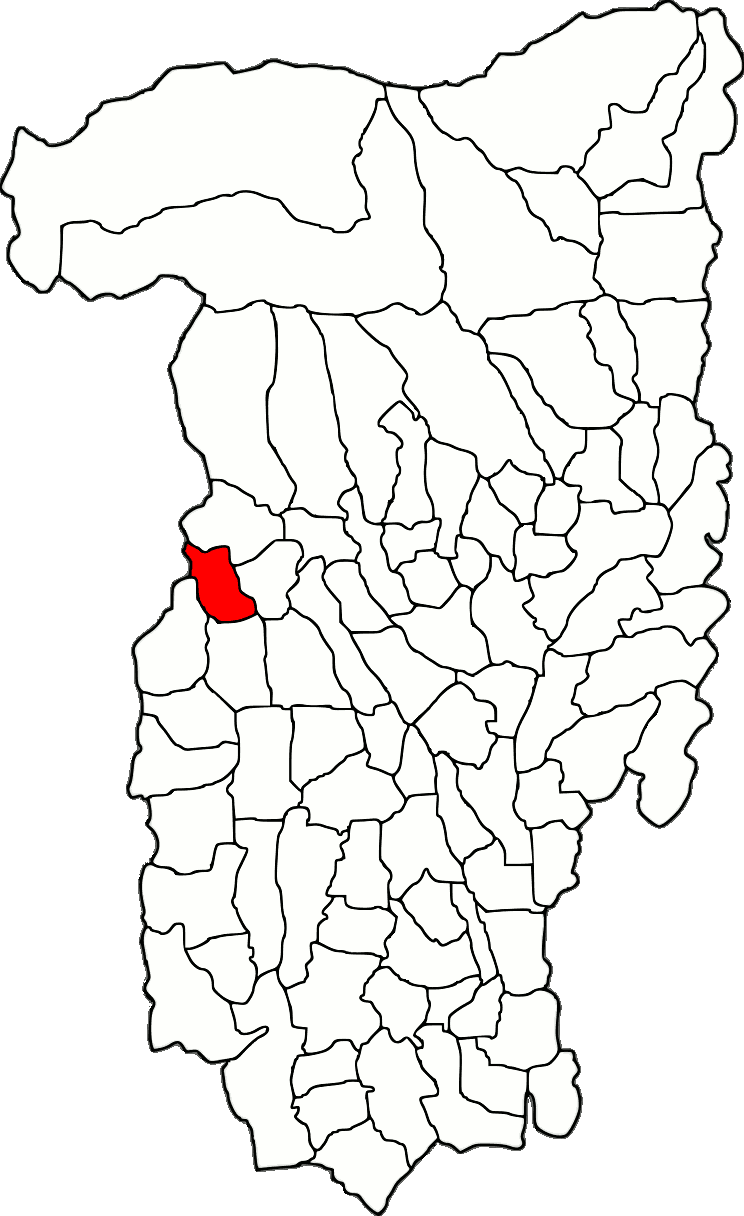
- Location in Vâlcea County

- Location in Romania
- Coordinates: 45°4′N 23°51′E
- Country: Romania
- County: Vâlcea

Government
  - Mayor (2020–2024): Ilie-Cosmin Anghelescu (PSD)
- Area: 29.2 km^{2} (11.3 sq mi)
- Elevation: 420 m (1,380 ft)
- Population (2021-12-01): 2,898
  - Density: 99/km^{2} (260/sq mi)
- Time zone: EET/EEST (UTC+2/+3)
- Postal code: 247340
- Area code: +(40) 250
- Vehicle reg.: VL
- Website: primaria-mateesti.ro

Mateești is a commune located in Vâlcea County, Oltenia, Romania. It is composed of three villages: Greci, Mateești, and Turcești.

The commune is situated on the Getic Plateau, at an altitude of 320 m (1,050 ft), on the banks of the river Tărâia. It is located in the western part of Vâlcea County, 20 km (12 mi) southwest of Horezu and 57 km (35 mi) west of the county seat, Râmnicu Vâlcea, on the border with Gorj County. It borders Stroești commune to the east, Alunu and Alimpești communes to the west, Slătioara commune (Milostea village) to the north, and the town of Berbești to the south.

== Natives ==
- Gedalyahu Fuchs (1911–1966), footballer and manager
