= Rovinari Power Station =

Power station in Romania

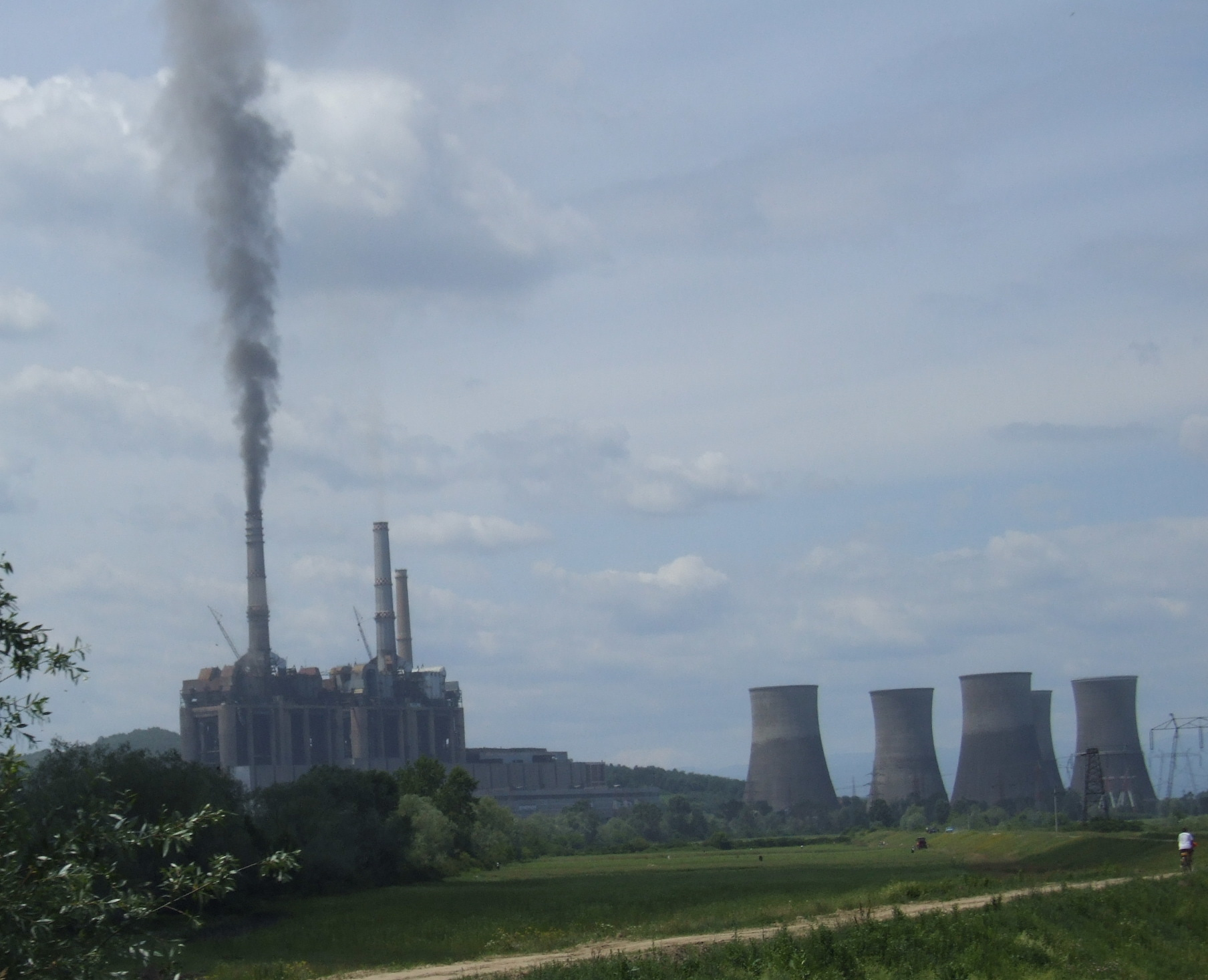
- Country: Romania
- Location: Rovinari, Gorj County
- Coordinates: 44°54′30″N 23°8′6″E
- Status: Operational
- Construction began: 1968
- Commission date: 23 June 1972
- Operator: Complexul Energetic Oltenia

Thermal power station
- Primary fuel: Lignite

Power generation
- Units operational: 2 x 330 MW; 1 x 330 MW (refurbishing)
- Units cancelled: 1 x 600 MW
- Units decommissioned: 2 x 200 MW; 1 x 330 MW
- Nameplate capacity: 990 MW

External links
- Commons: Related media on Commons

The Rovinari Power Station is one of the largest electricity producers in Romania, operating with two units and one mothballed unit of 330 MW each, thus totaling an installed capacity of 990 MW.

The power plant is situated in Gorj County (Southwestern Romania), on the banks of the Jiu River, near Târgu Jiu.

== Future extensions ==
The power plant expansion plans, which would have initially added a new 500 MW unit, then later changed to 600 MW with construction work done by China Huadian Engineering was cancelled. Other important works include the fitting of several sulfur filters at the existing power groups at a total cost of US$250 million.

== Operations ==
Unit 5 is currently being modernized until 31 December 2023, after which it will be back in operation.

Plans to decommission unit 3 by December 2022 were postponed due to the Russian invasion of Ukraine and energy security concerns. It was finally shutdown on 1 June 2023, and its sulfur filters will be reused for the unit 5 modernization.

All units will be decommissioned by 2030, according to the plans of reorganization by Complexul Energetic Oltenia.

| Unit | Capacity (MW) | Commissioned | Status |
|---|---|---|---|
| Rovinari - 1 | 200 | 1972 | decommissioned |
| Rovinari - 2 | 200 | 1972 | decommissioned |
| Rovinari - 3 | 330 | 1976 | decommissioned |
| Rovinari - 4 | 330 | 1976 | refurbished, operational |
| Rovinari - 5 | 330 | 1977 | refurbishing |
| Rovinari - 6 | 330 | 1979 | operational |
| Rovinari - 7 | 600 | - | cancelled |

== See also ==
- List of power stations in Romania
