= Hanaoka =

Hanaoka (written: 花岡 or 華岡) is a Japanese surname. Notable people with the surname include:

- Maho Hanaoka (花岡 麻帆, born 1976), Japanese long and triple jumper
- Hanaoka Seishū (華岡 青洲, 1760–1835), Japanese surgeon
