= Rovinari =

- Town
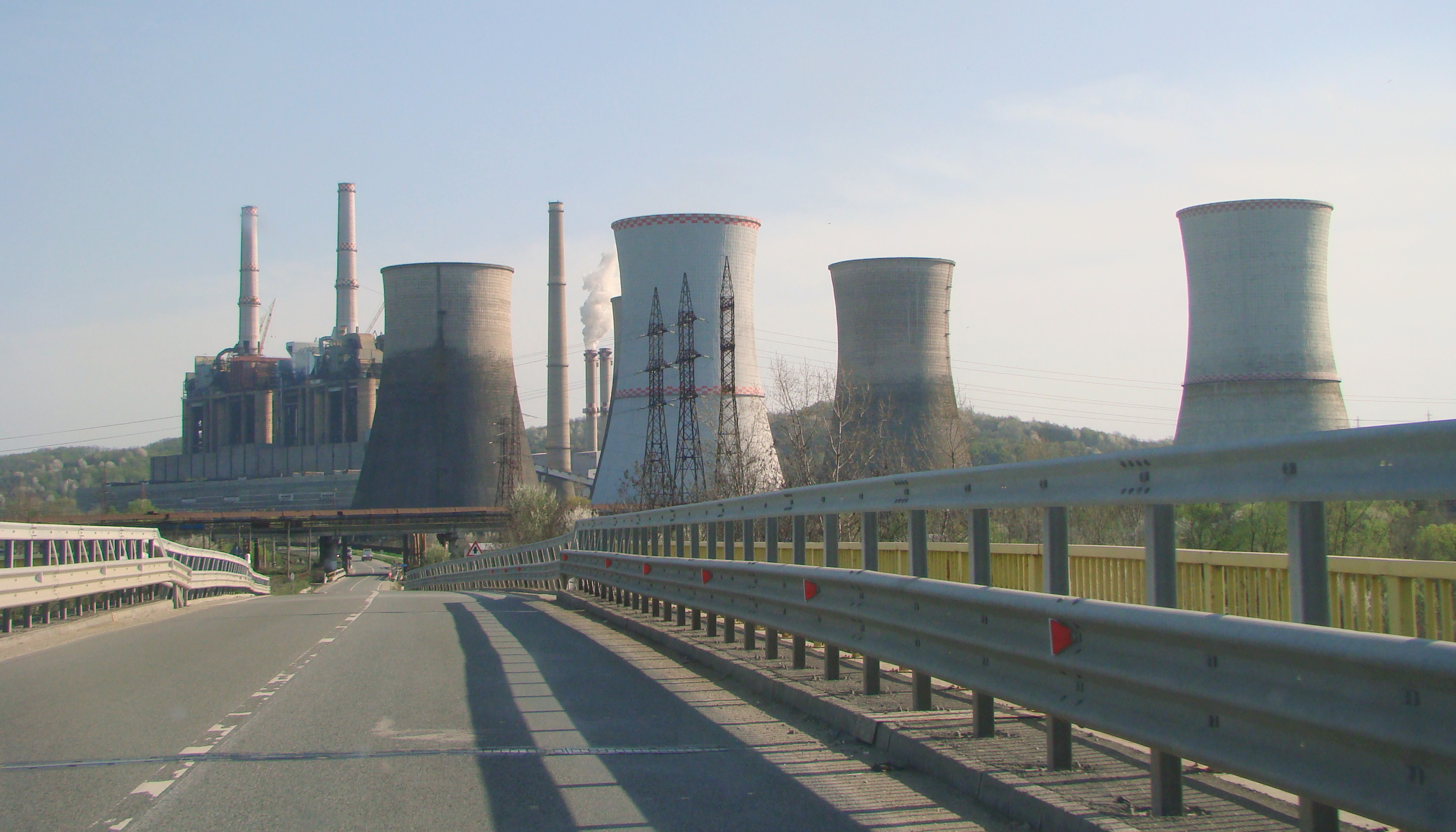
- Rovinari Power Station

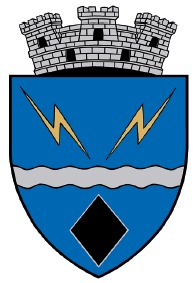
- Coat of arms

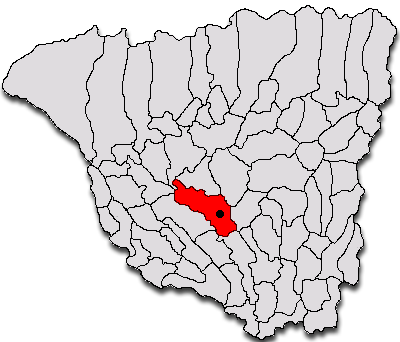
- Location in Gorj County

- Location in Romania
- Coordinates: 44°54′45″N 23°9′44″E
- Country: Romania
- County: Gorj

Government
  - Mayor (2024–2028): Dorin Filip (PNL)
- Area: 26.32 km^{2} (10.16 sq mi)
- Elevation: 195 m (640 ft)
- Population (2021-12-01): 10,246
  - Density: 389.3/km^{2} (1,008/sq mi)
- Time zone: UTC+02:00 (EET)
  - Summer (DST): UTC+03:00 (EEST)
- Postal code: 215400
- Area code: (+40) 02 53
- Vehicle reg.: GJ
- Website: www.primariarovinari.ro

Rovinari (Romanian pronunciation: [roviˈnarʲ]) is a town in Gorj County, Oltenia, Romania. A large coal burning electric power plant it is located near the town. Surface and underground lignite coal mines operate in the surrounding area. It officially became a town in 1981, as a result of the Romanian rural systematization program.

== Natives ==
- Theodor Costescu (1864–1939), educator and politician
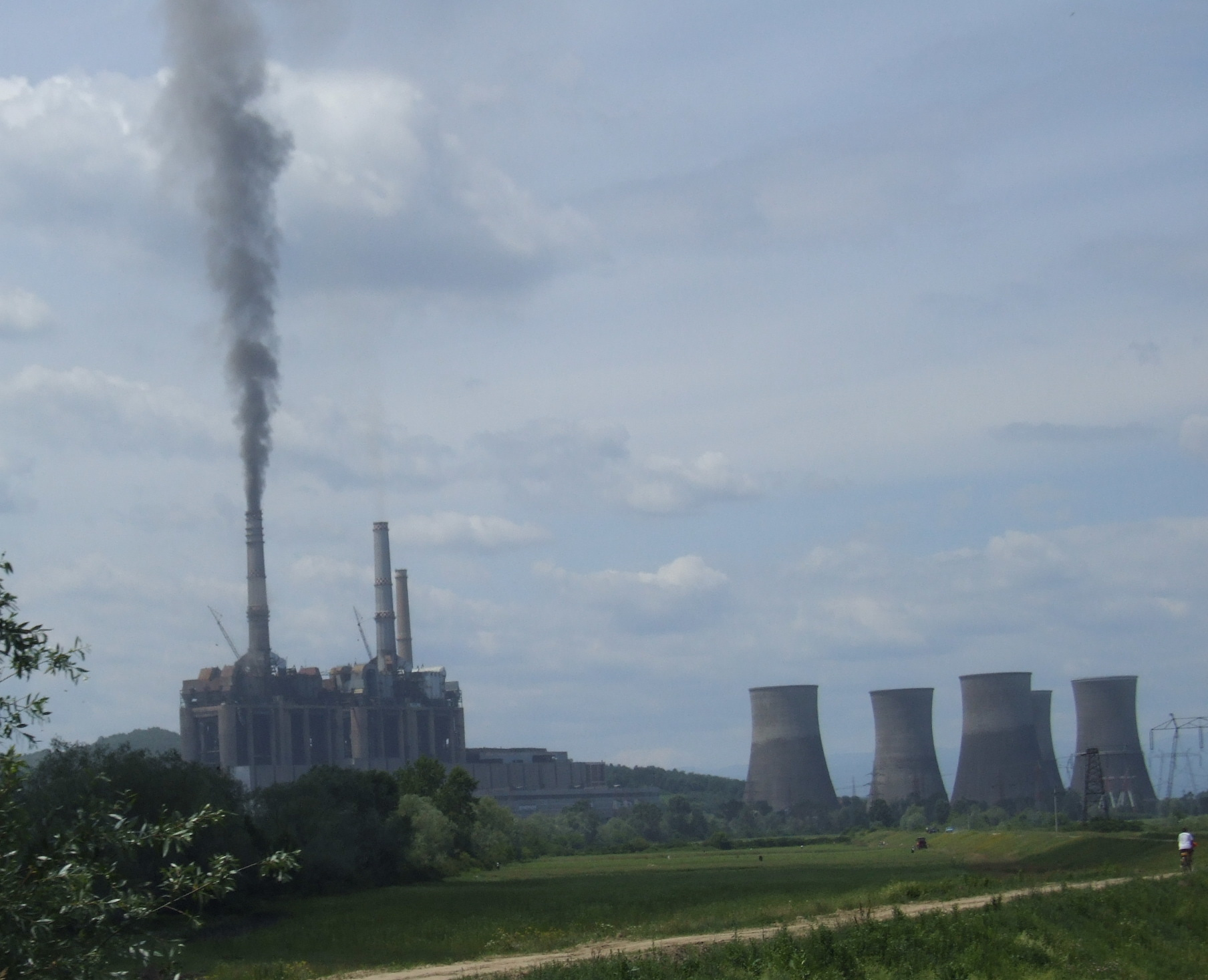
The lignite-fired electricity generating station at Rovinari

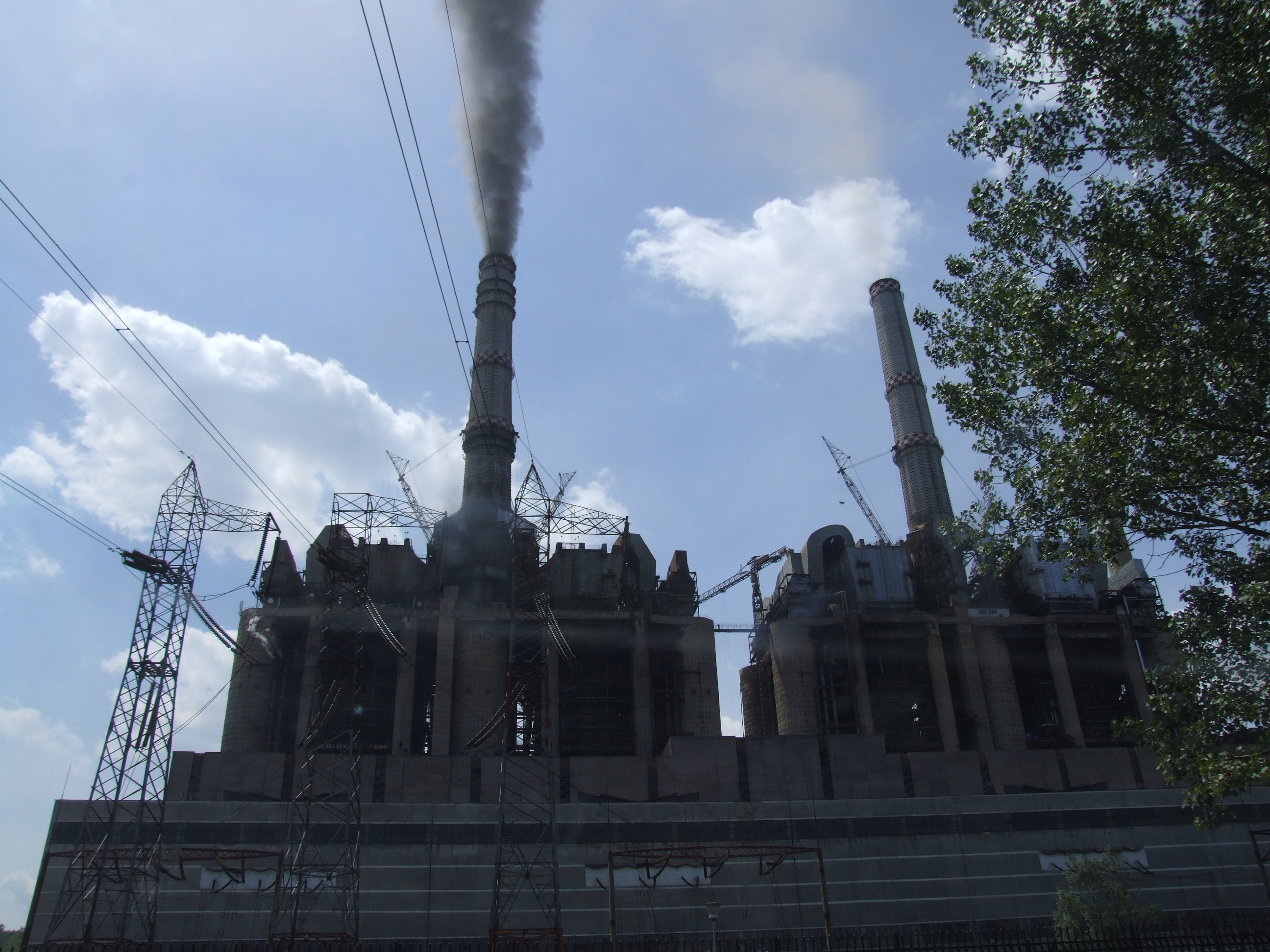
Another view of the power station.

Historical population
Year	Pop.	±%
1992	13,335	—
2002	12,603	−5.5%
2011	11,816	−6.2%
Source: Census data
