= Alunu =

- Commune
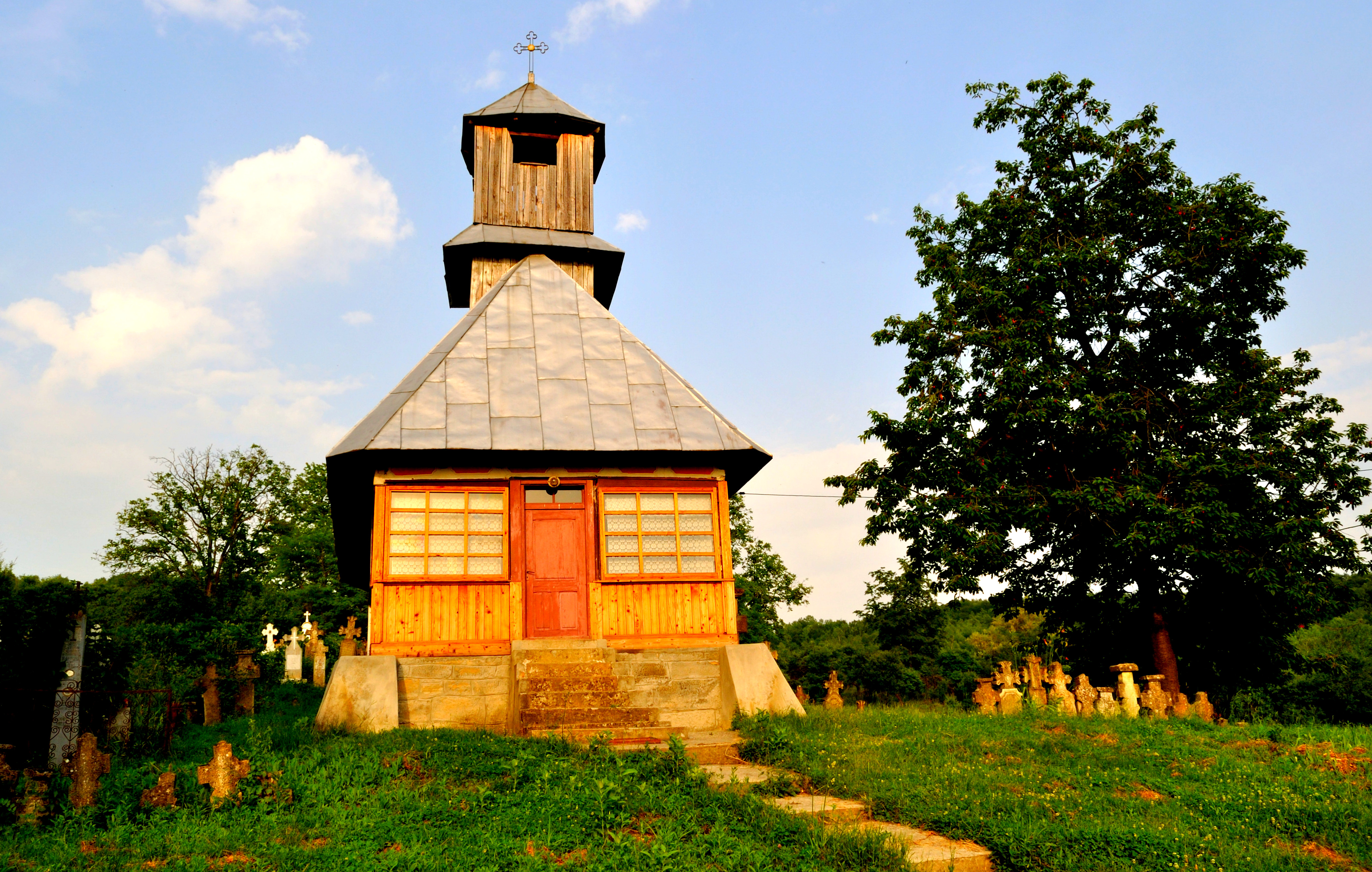
- St. Archangels Michael and Gabriel Church in Bodești

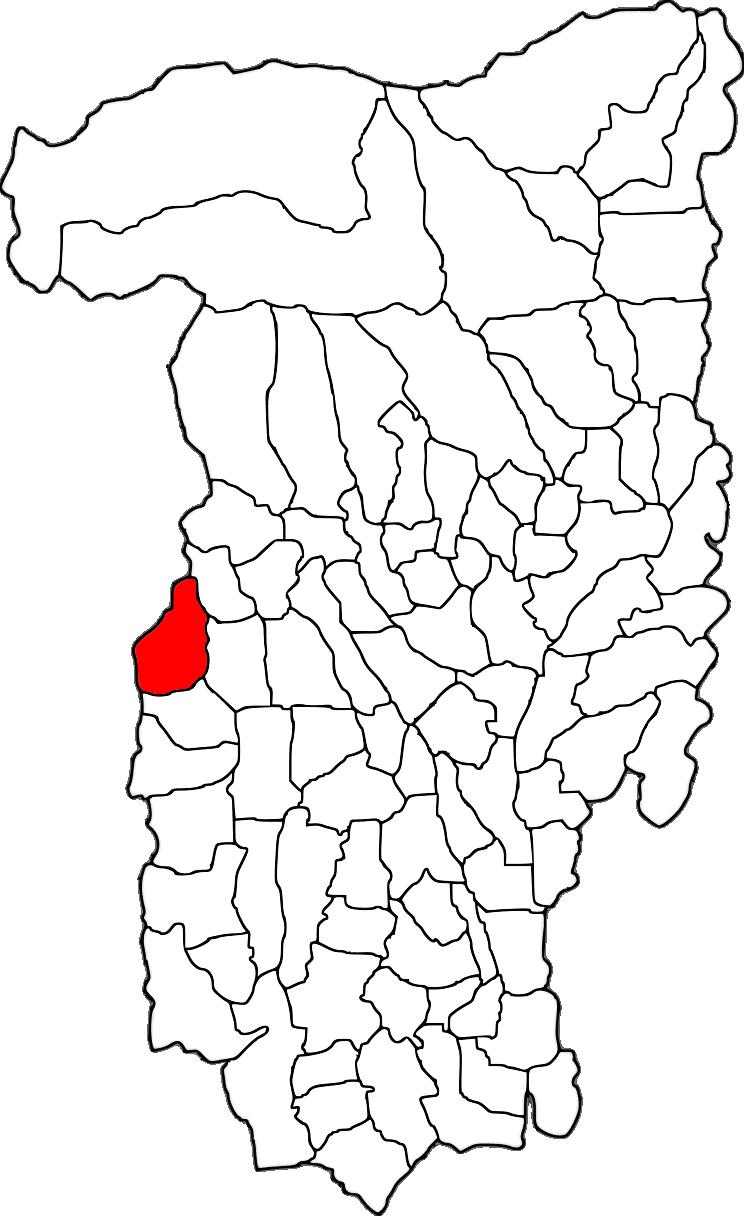
- Location in Vâlcea County

- Location in Romania
- Coordinates: 45°1′N 23°49′E
- Country: Romania
- County: Vâlcea

Government
  - Mayor (2024–2028): Emanuel Birăruți (PSD)
- Area: 62.41 km^{2} (24.10 sq mi)
- Elevation: 321 m (1,053 ft)
- Population (2021-12-01): 3,733
  - Density: 59.81/km^{2} (154.9/sq mi)
- Time zone: UTC+02:00 (EET)
  - Summer (DST): UTC+03:00 (EEST)
- Postal code: 247005
- Area code: +(40) 250
- Vehicle reg.: VL

Alunu is a commune located in Vâlcea County, Oltenia, Romania. It is composed of seven villages: Alunu, Bodești, Colțești, Igoiu, Ilaciu, Ocracu, and Roșia.

Historical population
Year	Pop.	±%
2002	4,573	—
2011	4,109	−10.1%
2021	3,733	−9.2%
Source: Census data
