= Spreader (railroad) =

Type of maintenance equipment

Jordan Spreader
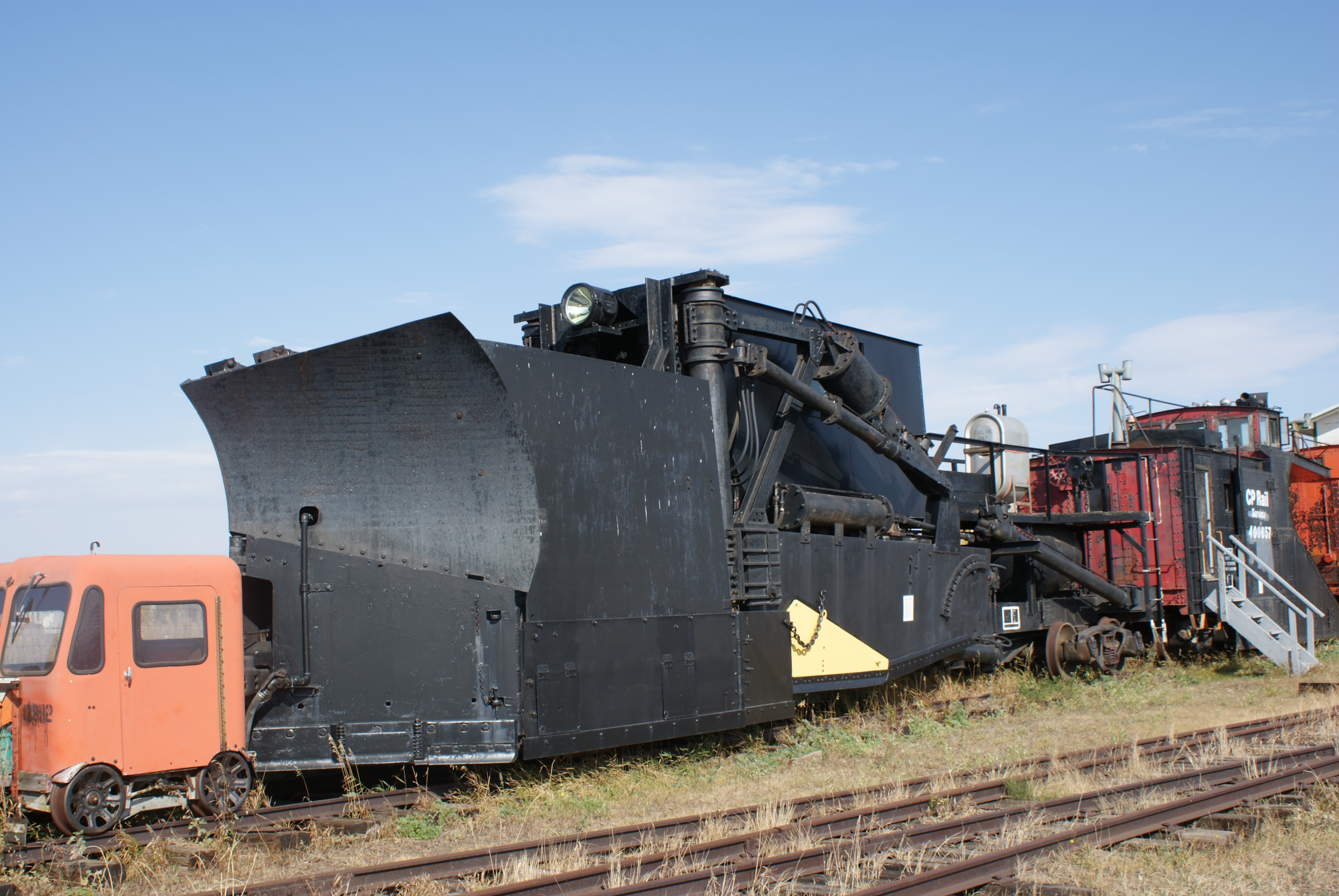
- Former Canadian Pacific Railway Jordan Spreader in the Saskatchewan Railway Museum.
- Manufacturer: O.F. Jordan Company
- Constructed: 1900–

A spreader is a type of maintenance equipment designed to spread or shape ballast profiles. The spreader spreads gravel along the railroad ties. The various ploughs, wings and blades of specific spreaders allow them to remove snow, build banks, clean and dig ditches, evenly distribute gravel, as well as trim embankments of brush along the side of the track. Spreaders quickly proved themselves as an extremely economical tool for maintaining trackside drainage ditches and spreading fill dumped beside the track.

The operation of the wings was once performed by compressed air and later hydraulics. Besides the MoW-operation, spreaders are also used in open cast mines to clean the tracks from overburden tipped from dump cars.

== Jordan spreader history ==
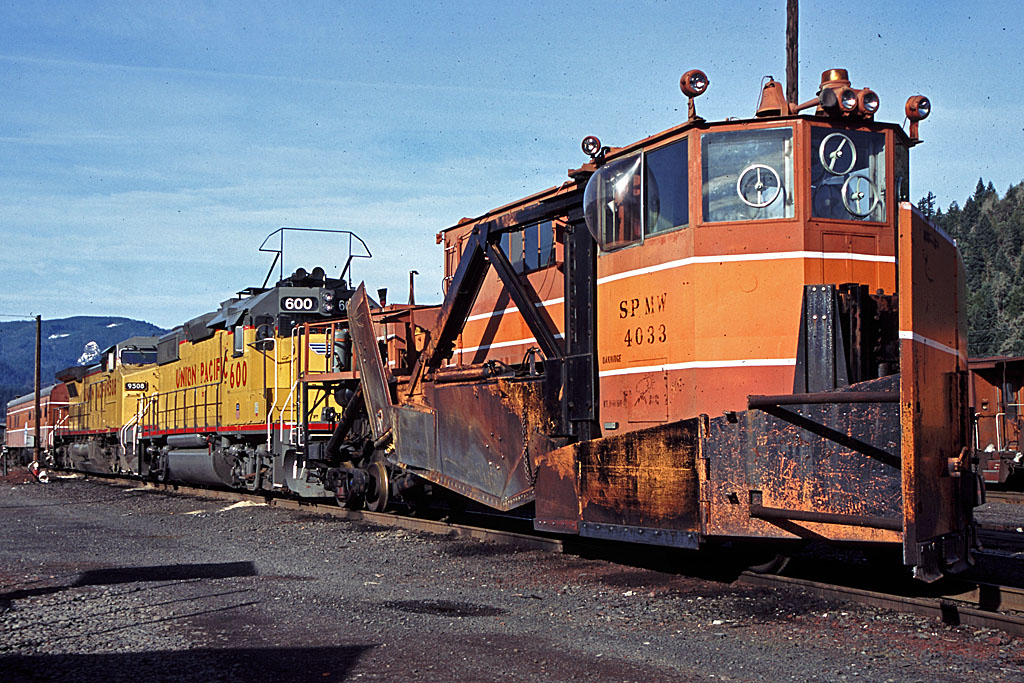
A Jordan Spreader adapted for snow-fighting

The Jordan spreader was the creation of Oswald F. Jordan, a Canadian road master who worked in the Niagara, Ontario area on the Canada Southern Railway, later a subsidiary of the New York Central Railroad. He supervised a crew at the St. Thomas Canada Southern shop in the early 1890s. Jordan's first patent, filed in 1890 and listing Robert Potts as co-inventor, covered a single-blade mechanism with the blade height adjustable with a hand crank and gearing.

Jordan formed his own company, O.F. Jordan Company, in 1898 and continued construction of Jordan Spreaders. By 1906, the company had moved to Chicago, Jordan was a U.S. Citizen, and the spreader was a far more sophisticated device, with blades on both sides of the car, pneumatic power for raising and lowering each blade, and considerably more rugged construction. By 1909, the spreader was being built on a steel-framed car body instead of the wood used in earlier models, and a plow was mounted on the front, with an extension in front of that for shifting material across the track from side to side. Shortly after this, Jordan added a pneumatic system for rapidly and automatically extending and retracting the side blades. At this point, the primary purpose of the Jordan spreader was spreading ballast along the tracks.

Following Jordan's death in 1910, Walter Riley took over management of the company and directed it for the next 50 years. Over the years that followed, the Jordan spreader was developed into a multi-purpose MoW vehicle with adjustable blades and ploughs added to the wings. New uses included trackside ditch maintenance and spreading fill dumped beside the track. Over 1,400 spreaders were built. Jordan spreaders are available by special order from Harsco Rail.

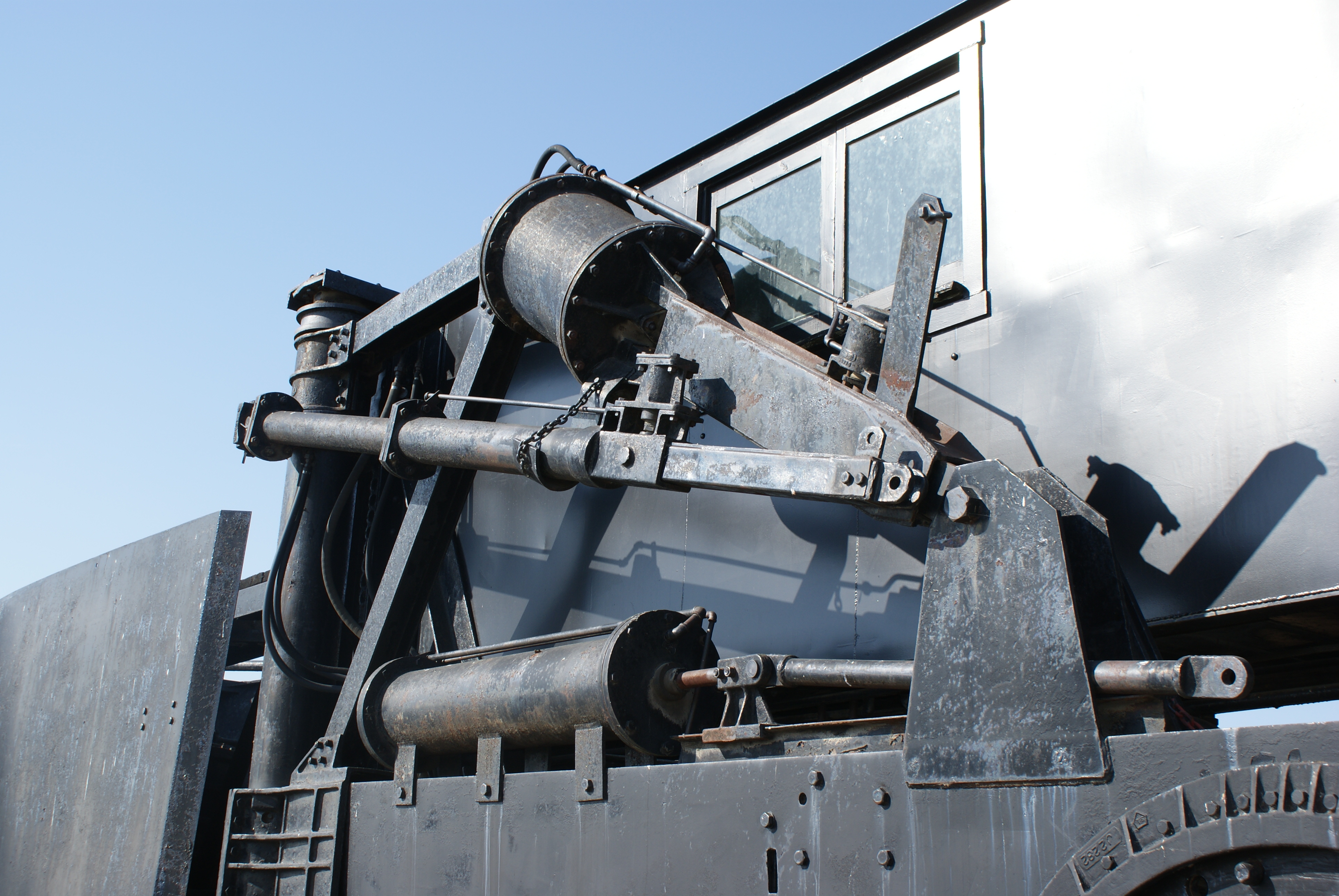
Pneumatics used to open and close wings

In 2001, the Jordan Spreader was inducted into the North America Railway Hall of Fame in the "Local:Technical Innovation" category. It shared this selection with another technical innovation, the rotary snowplow.
