= Călan steel works =

Former steel mill in Călan, Romania

Coordinates: 45°44′30″N 22°59′43.2″E

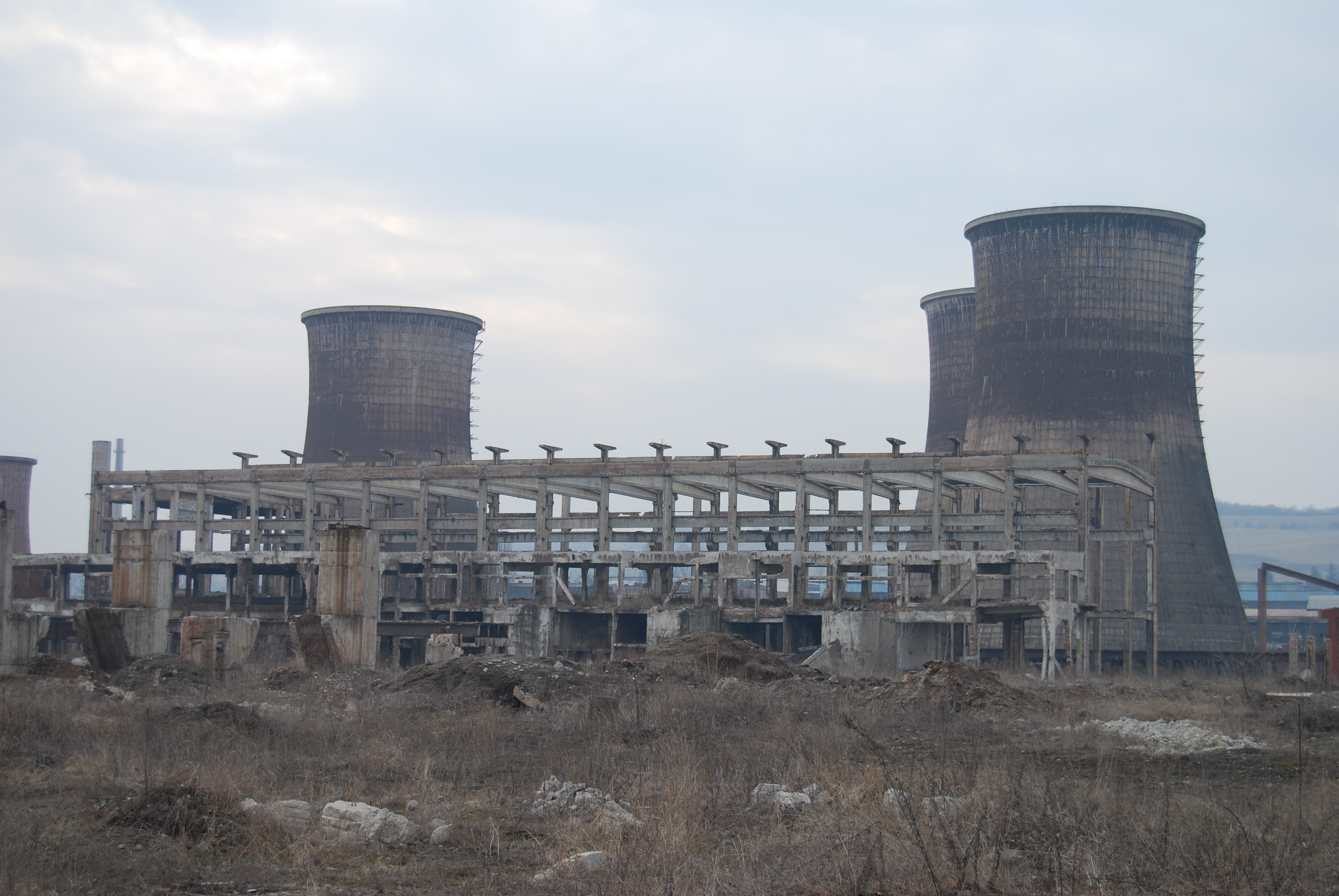
Călan steel works, 2009

The Călan steel works, formerly the Victoria Steel Works Călan (Romanian: Combinatul Siderurgic "Victoria" Călan), were a steel mill in the Transylvanian town of Călan, Romania. Begun around 1870, when the area was part of Austria-Hungary, the works underwent a powerful expansion following nationalization in 1948 by the nascent Communist regime, making a vital contribution to the growth of the town. Privatization in the late 1990s proved unsuccessful, and the works were largely abandoned within a decade, leading to economic hardship for Călan.

== History ==
=== Beginnings in Austria-Hungary ===
In 1867, the administration of the Brașov Mining and Metallurgy Company (Kronstädter Bergbau- und Hüttenvereins-Komplexes), headed by Prince Maximilian Egon I of Fürstenberg, purchased land for a steel works. The land, covering some 104 ha including swamps, came from the wife of a Hungarian nobleman. In 1868, German engineer Otto Gmelin was hired to draw up plans for the new enterprise. The decision to build at Călan was closely related to the fact that a railway line was being laid between Simeria and Petroșani, and work intensified at Călan once this line was complete. The first furnace was built starting on May 25, 1869 by the Brașov company, which also held the Teliuc mine. Inaugurated in the winter of 1871, it had a capacity of 82 m^{3} (2,900 cu ft). The second furnace started being built in 1874 and went operational the following year. Josef Massenez, a Belgian, supervised the construction work. Ore and dolomite used in production came straight from Teliuc. A foundry was begun in 1876, with two cupola furnaces added the following year.

At first, employees lived in houses on partly swampy ground surrounding the works. Ten houses were built in 1870; the total had risen to 78 by 1918. An administrative building and laboratory were also erected in 1870, while the narrow gauge railway for carrying ore from Teliuc on horse-drawn carts began to be laid down. During the early years, a casting room was finished, as well as a mechanical shop featuring a steam engine that ran the machines. Before the furnace was finished, production was centered in the latter unit, with ore, molten iron and fuel brought in using steam pressure. The platform and elevator were made of wood; the latter ran on steam power as well.

A railway from Teliuc to Călan was built in 1875 because horses were unable to deliver enough raw materials to meet the factory's needs. The railway, a 16.5-km section of narrow gauge track, was used by steam locomotives. The foundry was begun in 1876 and incorporated parts brought from the Rușchița factory. In 1877, the room for moulding and casting was completed, as were the cleaning unit and warehouse for cast objects, and the cupola furnaces began running.

By 1881, the works were converting cast iron into steel in a division that included a puddling oven, a steam hammer and rolling mills able to produce 4,000 tons of steel annually. In 1896, the original second furnace was replaced by a new structure that was 380 m^{3} (13,000 cu ft) in volume and could turn out 120 to 140 tons of cast iron daily. In 1897, the Călan Mines and Metallurgy Anonymous Society was set up as a joint-stock company; aside from the Călan works, this entity acquired the Teliuc mine and the factories at Rușchița and Oțelu Roșu from the Brașov company.

The water supply mechanism introduced in 1899 included a dam on the Strei River, two sluice gates, two settling basins, two infiltration basins, a 2450-m long concrete canal and a collecting pool. The two steam pumps provided water flow of up two 240 m^{3} per hour at a pressure of two atm. A unit for casting pieces for heavy machinery was built in 1908; this was extended in 1914 by adding a room for manufacturing commercial products. In 1911, the factory was bought by the Budapest-based Rimamurány–Salgótarján Iron Works, which remained the owner until 1924. In 1918, the furnaces stopped for a period of sixteen years, a main reason being a lack of coke and coal. In turn, these fuels were scarce because of difficulties in transporting along the railways from the coal-producing Jiu Valley. There were 1116 employees in 1916.

=== Interwar period ===
With the fuel shortage at hand, production was slow and inefficient between 1919 and 1921. In 1924, several years after the union of Transylvania with Romania, the works were involved in a restructuring that gave them a new owner in the process. A Bucharest-headquartered S.A. that owned the plants at Galați and at Nădrag took on Călan; the Chrissoveloni Bank and Max Auschnitt were also involved in the deal. The new concern that emerged from these moves, called the Titan SAR Metallurgical Plants, ended up owning the works at Călan, Oțelu Roșu, Galați, and Nădrag, as well as the Teliuc mine. Once rolling mills started operating at Oțelu Roșu, the foundry there and the workers who ran it were sent to Călan in mid-1926.

Following the economic crisis of the Great Depression (1929-1933), several investments became feasible. The Strei River hydroelectric power station was completed in November 1934; the plant was modernized and the furnaces were brought back into action. There were forty engineers and foremen and 671 workers in 1927; by 1938, the total number of employees stood at 1117. During World War II, the works suffered a certain amount of damage.

=== Communist era ===
In 1948, the new Communist regime nationalized the works, and the existing factory was expanded into a steel-manufacturing complex. In 1953, two semi-coking batteries started to be built. These became operational in 1956 and 1957 respectively, but were soon shut down due to lack of productivity. 1957 saw the introduction of the first carburizing oven, used to manufacture semi-coke by fluidization. Both of the old furnaces were rebuilt: the second, with a capacity of 250 m^{3}, entered production in 1952. The first, with a similar capacity, was ready in 1959. The furnaces relied on coke and methane gas for combustible material. In 1958, building started on a new foundry that was able to turn out 40,000 tons of ingots and parts annually. A new workshop was inaugurated in 1964, which allowed for on-site repair and production of replacement pieces. Its features included fifteen lathes, a machine repair unit, four lathes for straightening rolling mill cylinders, a carousel lathe, a planer and two all-purpose cutters.

Workers were housed on site in apartment blocks. The first of these, as well as an apprentices' school, appeared in 1949-1952. A new neighborhood of blocks for workers began to be built in 1959 on the sloping right bank of the Strei, in the vicinity of the Streisângeorgiu Church. In 1961, due to its economic importance, Călan commune was declared a town. In 1930, the population numbered 6801; this had risen to 14,738 by 1992. A prominent player in the Romanian steel industry, the works produced gray iron, coke, coal, tar and castings, including stoves and radiators. By the 1980s, the complex employed some 8000 individuals from the town and its surroundings. Rapid development under communism gave way after the 1989 Revolution to a slow disintegration.

=== Privatization and aftermath ===
In the wake of the Revolution, there were over 6000 employees at the works, which covered more than 200 ha at the time. Starting in 1995, several million dollars were invested into production of ductile iron tubes in the second furnace, an achievement mentioned by President Ion Iliescu during the following year's re-election campaign. However, the unit lay idle within a few years.

Privatization took place in 1998, when the works, by that time employing 1500, were broken up into twelve companies that began to go bankrupt one by one. The core business among these, called Sidermet, produced iron tubes. This company was sold by the state in 2003 and its new owners filed for bankruptcy in late 2005. By that point, Sidermet had 200 employees remaining, for the sole purposes of safeguarding and maintenance of the site. In 2010, there were two firms left standing, with under seventy employees. Much of the structure had been stolen for its scrap iron, and what was still functioning was under frequent threat from metal thieves. The scrap iron would be sorted and sold on land that was part of the works.

Effects of the closure on the town included elevated unemployment and pollution, although efforts were underway to clean up part of the site. In the works' heyday, the furnaces would emit dark exhaust that blackened the sky above Călan and the coke odor made the air difficult to breathe. In September 1982, the waters of the Strei changed color, with hundreds or perhaps thousands of dead fish floating in them. This was caused by excessive dumping of toxins from the works, and somewhat unusually given the censorship in Communist Romania, was mentioned later that year in Flacăra.

Four 1870s structures associated with the works are classified as historic monuments by Romania's Culture Ministry: the original works themselves, their archive, their guesthouse and the workers' club. Furthermore, the 1890s waterworks are also listed.

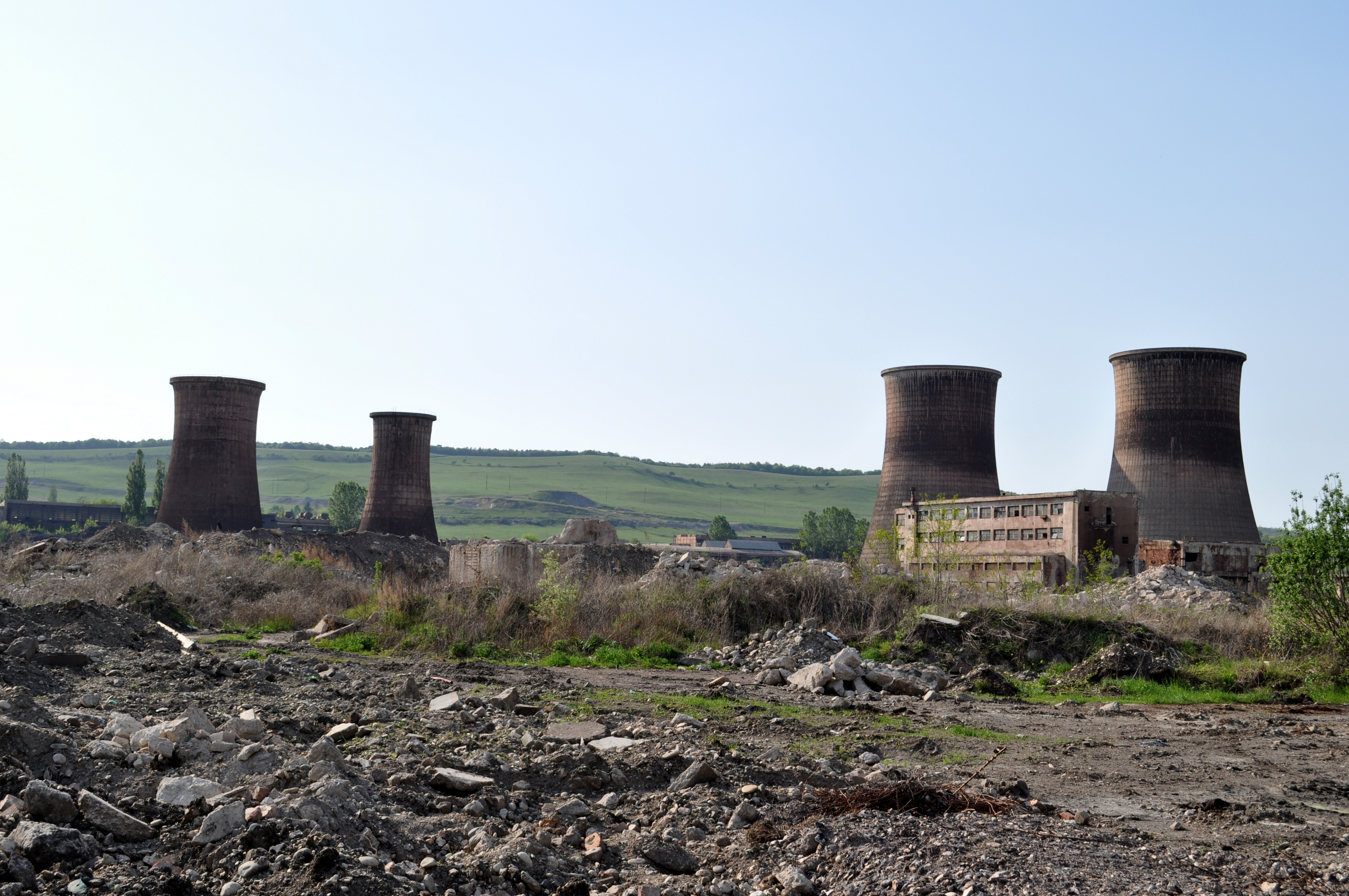
The works in 2012

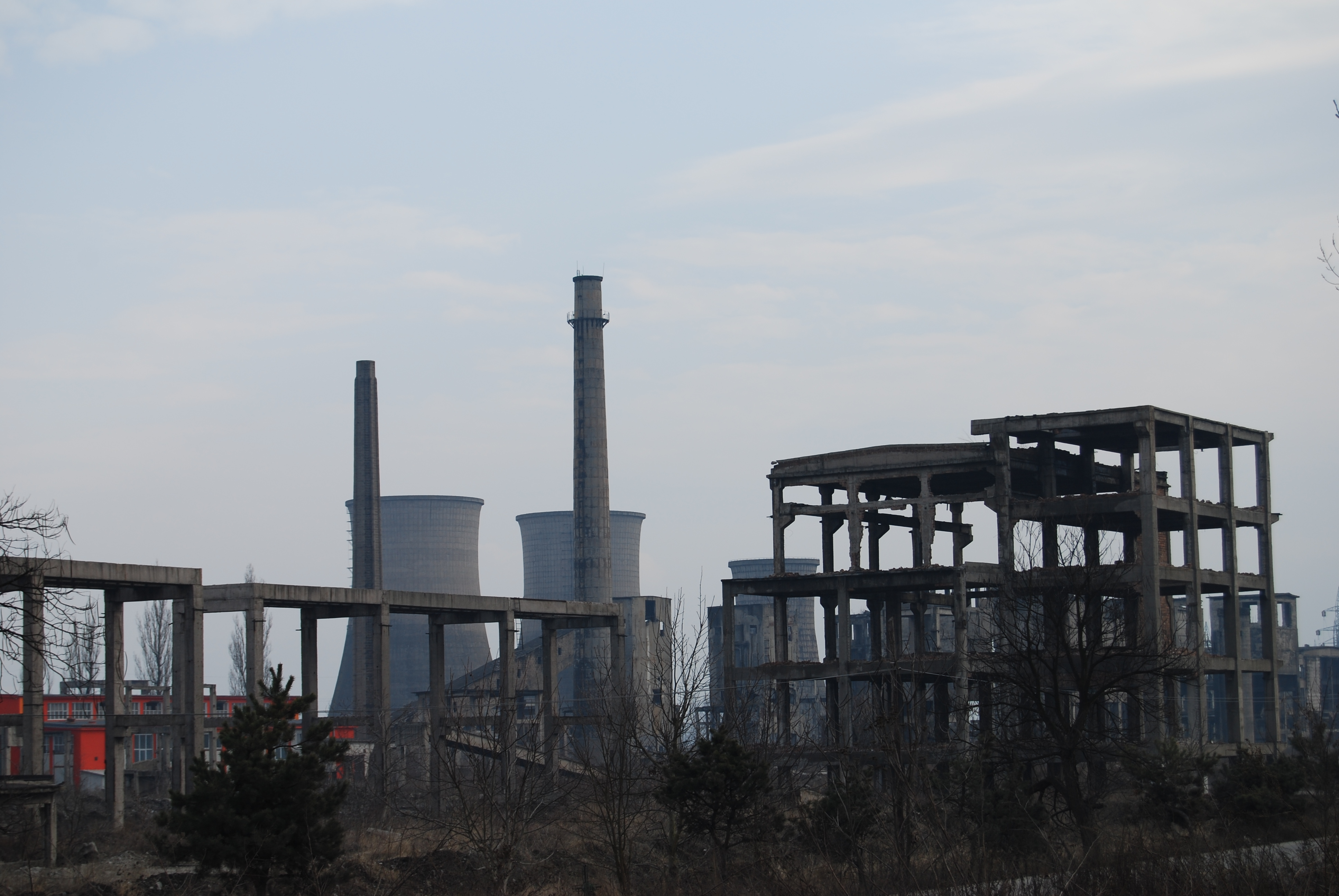
Ruins in 2009

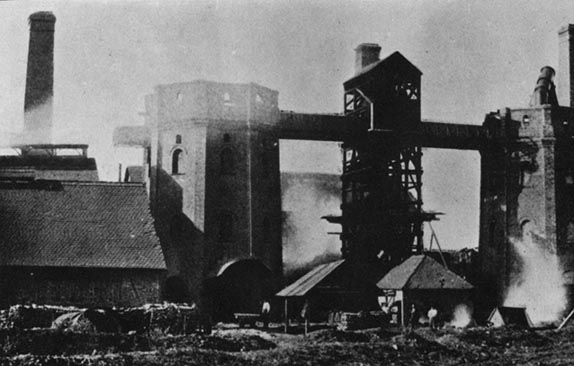
Furnace in 1896

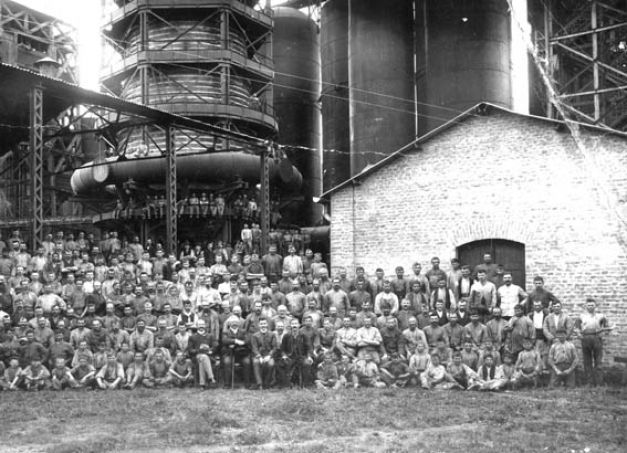
Workers surrounding a furnace soon after its inauguration

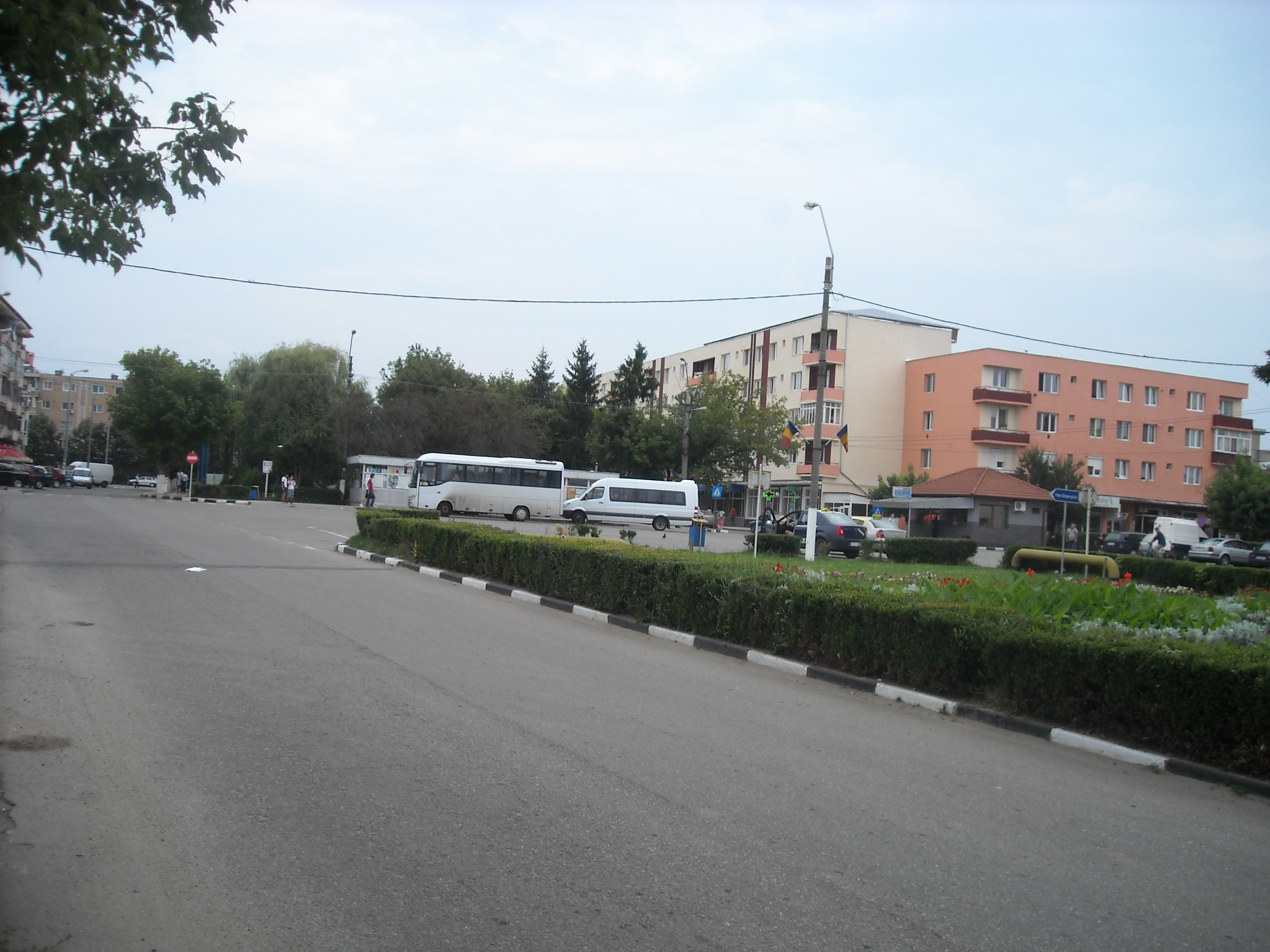
The town's newer area, with housing built for workers
