= Gheorghe Barbu =

Romanian politician (born 1951)

Gheorghe Barbu (born November 3, 1951) is a Romanian politician. A member of the Democratic Liberal Party (PD-L), he represented Hunedoara County in the Chamber of Deputies from 2000 to 2008, and served as Labor Minister in the Călin Popescu-Tăriceanu cabinet from 2004 to 2007.

== Biography ==
Born in Strei village, Călan, Hunedoara County, he graduated in 1975 from the Metallurgy faculty of the Politehnica University of Bucharest, and in 1977 completed post-graduate studies in economic engineering at the Bucharest Academy of Economic Studies. He was an engineer at the Brașov tractor factory (1975-1981), at the Deva mining institute (1981-1986) and at the Deva spare parts and repair firm (1987-1996).

Barbu is married and has two children.

== Political activity ==
He started his political activity right after the Romanian Revolution of December 1989. Between January and May 1990, he was a member of the National Salvation Front Council in Deva. In 1992, he became a member of the Democratic Party, at the time PD (FSN), Deva municipal organization (Hunedoara County). Within this organization, he held the positions of vice-president (1994-1998) and chairman of the PD's Permanent Bureau from Hunedoara (1998-2001). Currently, he holds the position of deputy chairman of the Permanent National Bureau of the Democratic Party (since 2001) and member of the National Council for the Leadership and Truth Alliance (PNL + PD).

Between 1996 and June 2000, he held the position of president of the Hunedoara County Council. In parallel, between November 1998 and June 2000, he was also the president of the Development Council of the V West Romania Region. He returned for a short time as marketing director at S.C. REMPES S.A. Deva (June-August 2000), after which he was appointed State Secretary of the Ministry of National Defense (August–December 2000).

Following the elections in November 2000, Barbu was elected as an MP of Hunedoara on the lists of the Democratic Party. During the parliamentary term in (2000–2004), he worked as a member of the Committee on Labor and Social Protection of the Parliament of Romania. He was re-elected as Hunedoara MP at the elections held in November 2004, and was temporarily the chairman of the Committee on Labor and Social Protection of the Parliament (until February 2005). As part of his parliamentary activity in the (2000-2004), Barbu was a member of the parliamentary friendship groups with South Africa and Canada. In the following parliamentary term (2004-2008), he was a member of the parliamentary friendship groups with Slovakia, India, and Tunisia.

On 29 December 2004, Barbu was appointed Minister of Labor, Social Solidarity and Family in the Tăriceanu I Cabinet. Among the legal proposals it is worth mentioning the one proposed in 2005, the draft law that was meant to reduce children allowances from RON 7,800,000 to RON 3,000,000. A simple displaying of the project on the website of the Ministry triggered such a hostile feedback from civil society that the day after its submission the Law on mother's allowances was removed from the site and dropped out.

He was replaced from the position of Minister of Labor on April 5, 2007 following the restructuring of the Tăriceanu Government, through the exit of the Democratic Party from the government. On the occasion of the end-of-term he presented the outcomes achieved and particularly, the percentage increase of pensions by 35% in real terms, although a 30% increase was foreseen for both systems within four years, and the increase of the average salary by far above predicted average.
