= Max Auschnitt =

Romanian businessman & political figure (1888–1957)

Max Carol Auschnitt
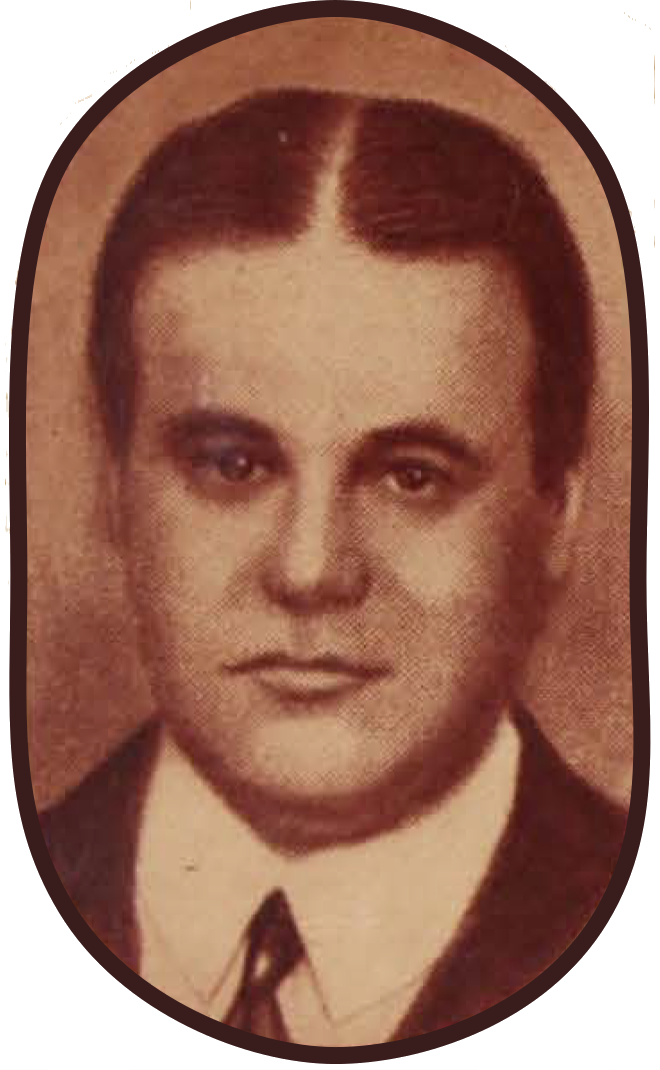

Executive of Iron Domains and Factory
- In office 1929 – August 18, 1939

Senator of Romania
- In office 1929–1933
- Constituency: Galați Chamber of Commerce and Industry
- In office 1937–1938

Personal details
- Born: February 14, 1888 Galați, Kingdom of Romania
- Died: January 18, 1957 (aged 68) New York City, United States
- Party: Independent (to 1937); National Peasants' Party (1937–1938)
- Spouse(s): Nelly Aronovici (m. ca. 1923; d. 1927); Livia Pordea (m. 1935; sep. 1950s)
- Relations: Augustin Pordea (father-in-law); Gustave Pordea (brother-in-law)
- Children: 2
- Education: Academy for Advanced Commercial Studies
- Occupation: Investor, philanthropist

Max Carol Auschnitt, also known as Ausschnitt, Auschnit or Aușnit (February 14, 1888 – January 18, 1957), was a Romanian businessman and political figure, one of his country's most prominent industrialists during the interwar period. Born to Ukrainian Jewish immigrants, he spent much of his youth abroad, returning in the 1910s to set up business as an importer of sheet iron, greatly expanding his father's fortune after World War I. Auschnitt was caretaker, and from 1929 managing director, of the Iron Domains and Factory (UDR) of Reșița, as well as founder of Titan-Nădrag-Călan (TNC), regional partner of Vickers-Armstrongs, and investor in many other fields. Primarily known as the "iron king" of Greater Romania, he had a business connection, and later a consuming rivalry, with manufacturer Nicolae Malaxa. The two were associate owners of Creditanstalt, which established their presence in Europe.

First elected to the Senate as an independent corporate member, Auschnitt turned to partisan politics as a financial backer of the National Peasants' Party; he had enduring collaborations with Virgil Madgearu and Dem I. Dobrescu. In tandem, he joined a camarilla formed around King Carol II, constantly bribing him and his mistress, Elena Lupescu. Such behavior drew negative attention to his businesses, particularly since Auschnitt used his political connections to secure Romanian state contracts, on which his fortune largely rested. His alleged corruption, along with his ethnicity and his publicized anti-fascism, made him a target for verbal and physical attacks by the far-right movements, in particular the Iron Guard. Auschnitt attempted to diffuse this threat by paying public tributes to Romanian nationalism and, more discreetly, by sponsoring the Guardist network. His 1935 marriage to Augustin Pordea's daughter, and his conversion to Roman Catholicism, elicited additional controversy.

Auschnitt found himself at odds with Carol after a string of matrimonial, economic, and geopolitical disputes. Marginalized by the passage of racial laws in 1937, he was further maligned when Carol's National Renaissance Front pursued a rapprochement with Nazi Germany. He was arrested shortly after the start of World War II, and imprisoned following a show trial. In the process, he lost his UDR shares, which went to Malaxa and Albert Göring, and then his citizenship. Carol himself fell from power in 1940, with Ion Antonescu replacing him as dictator. Despite being antisemitic, this new regime bargained over TNC shares, and finally cleared Auschnitt of all charges in 1942. Once freed, he turned to sponsoring underground opposition groups, and was also involved in helping fellow Jews to escape the Holocaust. He had a minor role in plotting the anti-fascist coup of 1944, though he himself had to flee Romania before the event, and was sentenced to death in absentia. Returning to assist the Allied Commission, he was slowly pushed back into exile by signs that the Romanian Communist Party was establishing a new dictatorship.

The new communist regime again withdrew Auschnitt's citizenship, before pronouncing him guilty of treason. This charge referred to Auschnitt's involvement with anti-communist resistance groups, including his allegedly financing Nicolae Petrașcu's Iron Guard cells. Stripped of his Romanian properties, Auschnitt relaunched himself as an entrepreneur in the plastics industry, and obtained American citizenship. His final political activities were as a sponsor of the Romanian National Committee, which split into pro-Auschnitt and pro-Malaxa factions, respectively led by Constantin Vișoianu and Nicolae Rădescu.

== Biography ==
=== Beginnings ===
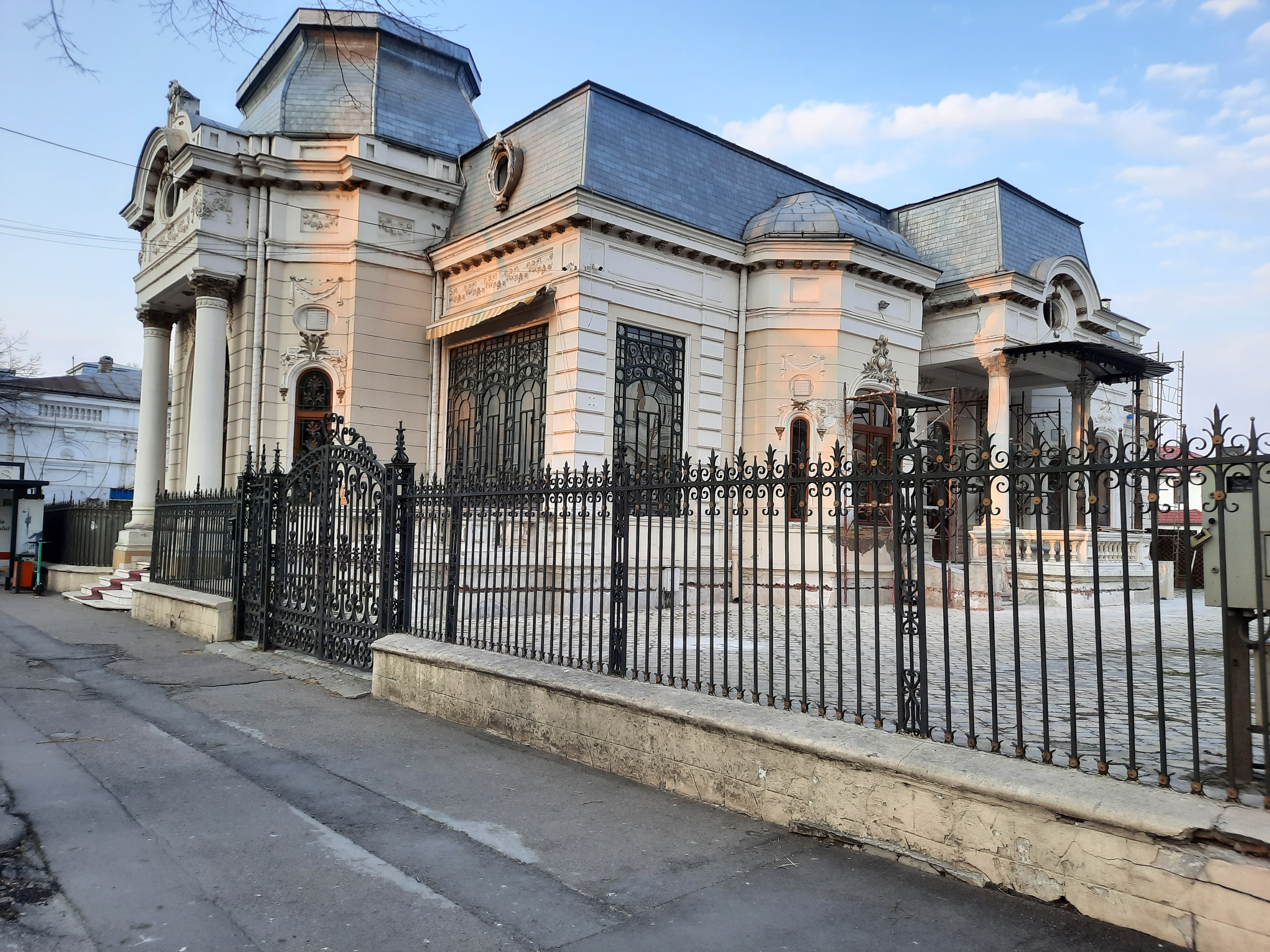
The Auschnitt home in Galați (2022 photograph)

Auschnitt was the scion of Ukrainian Jewish immigrants listed as nationals of Austria-Hungary, though he may have claimed Sephardic ancestry. A hostile piece by journalist Romulus Damian claims that the Auschnitts, including Max's father Olias, his mother Clara, and his elder brother Edgar, had illegally crossed into the Romanian Kingdom from Galicia, and then bribed the authorities into obtaining citizenship. This claim was repeated in 1939 by Justice Minister Istrate Micescu, who described the Auschnitts' naturalization as based on "dubious certificates". Known in early records as "Osias Ausschnitt", Max's father had a background in the iron trade. He registered his own import–export firm in the port city of Galați on June 14, 1884. Olias steadily amassed a large fortune, which in 1908 included one of Romania's two largest entrepôts, and which Max would later treble. The family home in Galați was situated across from that of Panait Malaxa, uncle of Auschnitt's lifelong business rival, Nicolae Malaxa.

According to one account, Max grew up in Galați, his native city, and attended the same school as Virgil Madgearu, who was to become his political associate. This is contradicted by other records, which note that Olias had been moved back into Austria-Hungary "shortly after Max's birth", meaning that the latter spent all his childhood years in Vienna, only returning to Galați in 1910. It is known that he studied abroad, in Vienna and London, graduating from the Academy for Advanced Commercial Studies. Upon regaining Romania, he formed a commercial firm dealing in Austrian sheet-iron imports, and then set up the Kingdom's first wire manufacturing plant. Rumors surfaced that such ventures were being propped up financially by the Austrian secret police. Several members of the Auschnitt family served in the Romanian Army during the campaigns of World War I, which resulted in the establishment of Greater Romania; Max was a volunteer in a signals' regiment. Edgar had been bypassed for the 1915 draft, after presenting himself as an Austro-Hungarian subject.

Economist Nicolae Păvălucă suggests that Max Auschnitt built his personal wealth around the Galați nails factory that was sold to him by Niță Caltofeanu "not long after the first world war". After originally serving as that enterprise's envoy in Bucharest, he founded enterprises such as Socomet and Metalunit, which he used to corner the sheet-metal market. Young Auschnitt then moved his offices to the Banat—once that region united with Romania, entrusted with the administration of the Iron Domains and Factory (UDR). According to his own account, he was asked to become full manager of that company in 1929, after stocks had plummeted. Journalist Al. Vidran argues that both he and Malaxa were called in as experts by the National Liberal Party's banking lobby, and that they used their influence to destroy local competitors. Auschnitt established an empire that included the UDR, as well as smaller factories or mines in such places as Anina, Armeniș, and Bocșa. His land property was said to cover 150,000 acres, including 11,000 hectares of forest outside Nădrag.

Auschnitt went on to serve as President of the Banat's General Association of Industry and Vice General of the Union of Industrialists of Romania. Dubbed "iron king" and "Romania's Zaharoff", he was overall "the greatest power in Rumania's armament, mining and metal industries." Together with his brother Edgar, Max owned several steel and munitions businesses including the Titan-Nădrag-Călan (TNC) chain, which is claimed to have employed over 4,900 workers. Through this group, formed in 1924, Max was connected to Vickers-Armstrongs, making him a participant in the European arms trade. This reflected his Anglophile outlook, first brought up when he defended Vickers against rivals at Škoda Works. Auschnitt was especially successful as owner of the UDR, which had amassed 1 billion lei in capital. This enterprise alone had 17,000 salaried workers, covering 80% of Romania's steel production, and 50% of locomotives, while acquiring most of Astra Brașov, an automotive plant, and minority shares in Galați shipyard. From 1930, a syndicate comprising the TNC, Creditanstalt, and Chrissoveloni Bank controlled 60% of UDR shares, while Vickers had an additional 13%. From 1934, the UDR agreed to co-sponsor all state orders for Vickers canons and ammunition.

Auschnitt claimed that Edgar alone ran TNC from 1929, but his connections to that company surfaced in later talk about his conflicts of interest. He was also among the managers of various foreign companies in Central Europe, as well as of Romanian-based companies, including Chrissoveloni and the Romanian Telephone Company. In 1931, he allied himself to Malaxa in order to acquire controlling interest in Creditanstalt. This business was overseen through their consortium, the Compagnie Européenne de Participations Industrielles (CEPI), which operated out of Monaco. A "brainchild of the Aușnit brothers", CEPI also provided security for Vickers' return on investments, which, in Monaco, were "free of currency restrictions and political danger". Vidran additionally notes that CEPI broke good practices by being at once the UDR's creditor and debtor.

=== Clash with the Iron Guard ===
Journalists circulated rumors according to which Auschnitt had enjoyed a close connection to Carol Caraiman, who, in 1930, became Carol II, King of the Romanians. Vidran claims that, together, Auschnitt and Malaxa immediately sent 100 million lei to the monarch's cultural fund. According to other such reports, it was Auschnitt who arranged for Carol to meet and fall in love with Elena Lupescu, while also sponsoring him during his 1920s exile. Auschnitt belonged to a branch of Romanian Freemasonry, frequenting Meșterul Manole Lodge alongside Malaxa and Aristide Blank, and, through it, sponsoring Carol's political-cultural journal, Revista Fundațiilor Regale. All three financiers were also visible members of Carol's camarilla—although Auschnitt's inclusion was comparatively late. By January 1936, six former Finance Ministers, including two of the National Peasants' Party (PNȚ), were reportedly serving on the TNC's executive board. Such connections became the source of controversy, since Auschnitt, like Malaxa and Dumitru Mociornița, thrived on government contracts. As noted by economic historian Horațiu Dan, these figures "prospered strictly from contracts involving the state." Similarly, historian Ioan Scurtu mentions the "huge profits" collected by Auschnitt and Malaxa from such ventures, and how these were shared with Carol and his courtiers, including Ernest Urdăreanu. According to Scurtu, Carol was first persuaded to form this ring in June 1931, when Malaxa and Auschnitt presented him with a large bag of cash.

From 1929 to 1933, Auschnitt represented Galați Chamber of Commerce and Industry in the Senate of Romania. He could only qualify for this office after being first inducted into the Chamber's offices at Deva, at some point in 1928. Although he ran and won as an independent, he received official backing from the PNȚ administration in both the 1928 election and the 1932 reelection, running unopposed in the latter. In February 1932, Calendarul newspaper reported that Auschnitt had intervened to bloc senators from approving of a price ceiling on sugar. At the time, Auschnitt himself admitted that his Creditanstalt was trying to collect the 50-million schilling it was owed by Romanian sugar refineries, and would therefore oppose any reduction of their profit margin. During the subsequent electoral race, the same daily hosted allegations that he and Malaxa, who also ran in the elections with government support, were financially backed by the UDR; according to this source, Auschnitt had personally diverted 10 million lei from the salary fund, and was using it in the campaign. Balance sheets released in mid-1932, at the height of the Great Depression, showed the UDR having "a net profit of 47 million, in addition to a share capital of 750 million, despite huge unemployment and permanent downsizing."

In that context, Auschnitt was also becoming noted as the PNȚ's financial backer. Lawyer-memoirist Petre Pandrea alleges that Auschnitt had corrupted his old friend Madgearu, who was by then the PNȚ ideologue, ensuring that Madgearu never acted in the interest of Romanian peasants. According to files kept by agents of the Siguranța, Auschnitt was also especially close to politician Dem I. Dobrescu. At a time when 32% of Romanian commercial enterprises were owned by Romanian Jews, ethnicity and a high profile in financial life made Auschnitt a topic of antisemitic libel, including blackmail by the Iron Guard. Already in the late 1920s, Auschnitt allegedly purchased scrap iron from Iron Guard cooperatives, as a means to disguise his purchase of influence. However, protection remained uncertain: according to one report, an associate of the Guard, Gheorghe Beza, received 20,000 lei from Constantin C. Orghidan, manager of TNC, to assassinate his boss. Siguranța records also include allegations that Auschnitt, Malaxa and Dobrescu were behind the magazines Credința and Floarea de Foc, launched by Sandu Tudor in an attempt to promote Christian anti-fascism. It remains more credibly attested that Auschnitt was by then a sponsor of anti-fascist campaigns in various other newspapers and journals. However, the outlawed Romanian Communist Party cited Auschnitt exclusively as a "warmonger"—a charge which appears for instance in a February 1934 article by Gheorghe Gheorghiu-Dej.

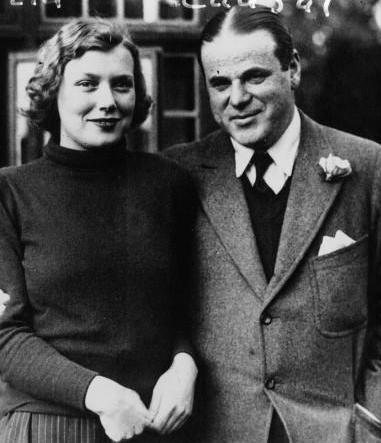
Auschnitt and then-fiancée Leonora Brook in 1932

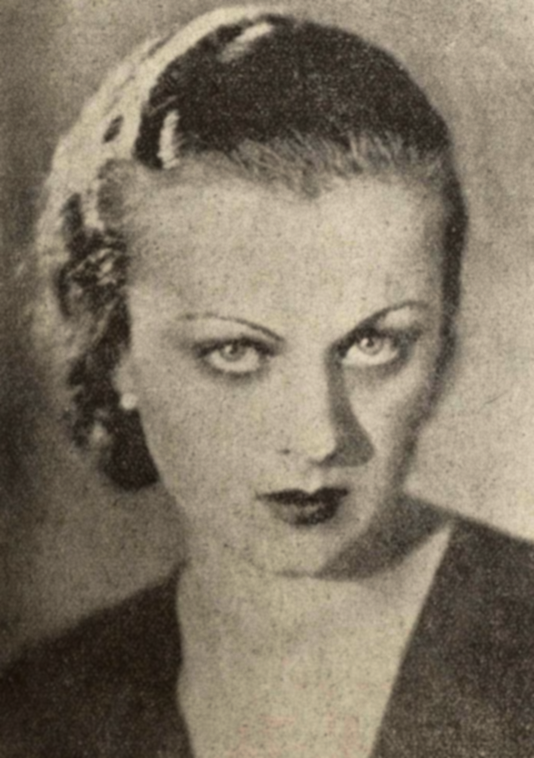
Livia Pordea in 1934

Auschnitt's first marriage was to a Jewish woman, Nelly, who in March 1924 gave birth to a son, later known as Steve Aușnit. Her father, the banker Arnold Aronovici, cemented Auschnitt's links with British capital, and allegedly plotted with him to bring in a small British firm, Stewart & Partners, as builders of the Bucharest–Brașov highway; this scheme also involved some in the PNȚ, in particular Madgearu. Nelly died "after brief suffering" on February 16, 1927, aged 26. Max was then engaged to Leonora Brooke, daughter of the White Rajah, Charles Vyner Brooke, whom he was set to marry in September 1933. The wedding was called off, allegedly because Lenore favored another lover.

=== Duca assassination and Pordea scandal ===
Auschnitt did not seek reelection in December 1933, informing the public that he no longer thought it wise for Jews to appear in political roles. Reportedly, he also blocked a deal between the National Liberal Party, which held power with Ion G. Duca as the Prime Minister, and a communitarian Jewish Party—his contribution criticized by the latter as an act of political sabotage. Days later, a Guardist death squad murdered Duca, exposing the movement to Carol's violent retaliation. As reported by writer R. G. Waldeck, the Guardist leader Corneliu Zelea Codreanu, fearing for his life, messaged Auschnitt the warning: "If you don't find a way to save me, you'll be bumped off next." According to this account, Auschnitt and Lupescu, by then a royal mistress, hid Codreanu from the authorities, and also negotiated a truce; Waldeck also claims that Auschnitt and Malaxa agreed to finance the Iron Guard, thus ensuring its political survival into the post-Duca era. The allegation was also publicized by Panait Istrati, who sympathized with the anti-Codreanu group, the Crusade of Romanianism. He noted that Guardists took Auschnitt's money while still reining violence on lower-class Jews, who were powerless.

According to historian Grigore Traian Pop, the claim that Auschnitt was Codreanu's sponsor is fundamentally inaccurate. Pop sees such rumors as planted in the public arena by Blank and Victor Iamandi, who were Auschnitt's rivals at the court. Several Guardists have independently confirmed that Auschnitt advanced sizable contributions to their cause over an unspecified period—though, as noted by historian Roland Clark, these merely showed that he wanted his business protected from harm. The conflict between Codreanu and Auschnitt was finally resumed in 1934, when the Guard's press referred to "Max Auschnitt the kike", "national bloodsucker", as the power behind the throne. This notion was also embraced by the Romanian Front (FR), a far-right dissidence of the PNȚ, whose newspapers claimed that "the kike Max Auschnit" had steadily raised the price of iron after 1930. As Damian argued: "He, the Jew from Galicia, determined whether of not the Romanian peasant deserved to own a plow [...]. He dictated the price of nails, of corrugation, of iron, or heating stoves, of gutter pipes, of anything iron-related".

Auschnitt remained noted for his escapades with film stars and high-society ladies, before finally marrying Livia Pordea (also rendered as Prodea or Pordeanu), from a political family of Cluj. His father-in-law was Augustin Pordea, at the time a serving as Vice President in the Senate. The wedding came in January 1935, at the same time as Auschnitt's conflict with the Iron Guard, and therefore had to take place in secrecy, at Augustin Pacha's chapel in Timișoara. Respecting the wishes of his in-laws, Auschnitt abandoned Judaism and converted to Catholicism. Reputedly, the issue of his conversion only served to enrage his Guardist adversaries. It also caused a polemic in religious circles, sparked by the observation that the Pordeas were Greek Catholics, whereas Auschnitt had opted for the Roman Catholic Church. Pandrea claims that Madgearu became the Auschnitts' godfather, though other sources contrarily allege that he was their godson. Auschnitt bought his family the Gheorghe Manu villa on Aleea Alexandru, in the Bucharest ward of Dorobanți. Designed by Grigore Cerchez, and partly redecorated by Auschnitt himself, it was situated very near to Malaxa's residence. The Billionaires' Club, which reunited Auschnitt with Malaxa and Constantin Argetoianu, was housed at this location until 1937, when its members rented Elisabeta Palace. His social advancement also raised the profile of Livia's brother, August "Gustave" Pordea, who took as his lover the actress Elvira Godeanu.

Argetoianu reports that, in 1937, Auschnitt attempted to buy a portion of Romania's sugar industry from Creditanstalt, which had foreclosed various Romanian refineries. He found himself overwhelmed by liabilities and resold his shares to Carol II, who immediately obtained a debt restructuring. For a while, the new couple was especially close to Lupescu, for whom Auschnitt and other camarilla businessmen obtained villas in Dorobanți and Sinaia. Auschnitt alone purchased from the Aga Khan the steed Firdussi, which he then presented as a gift for Carol. According to reports by Carol's lawyer George de Berea, Auschnitt and Malaxa met in Lupescu's house for poker matches, using gold coins as tokens. Argetoianu and Vidran both note that Auschnitt made sure to play a losing hand.

Auschnitt's extreme wealth made him into a patron of the arts. Though a Catholic, he donated to the Orthodox parishes in Hăuzești and Săceni. He intended to purchase, and thus rescue, the Teitler house in Galați, which popular opinion claimed as the house of a national hero, Alexandru Ioan Cuza. He renounced this plan upon being told by historian Nicolae Iorga that the building had no cultural value. From 1935, his donations helped Gavrilă Marinescu build an administrative palace for the Romanian Police. He was also said to be involved in regular charity, as the person sponsoring soup kitchens feeding the proletariat in Țara Moților. One anecdote suggests that Auschnitt heard actors Grigore Vasiliu Birlic and Ion Iancovescu plead for financial assistance, before presenting them with a literal wall of cash, and asking them to pick out a layer of money.

=== Marginalization ===
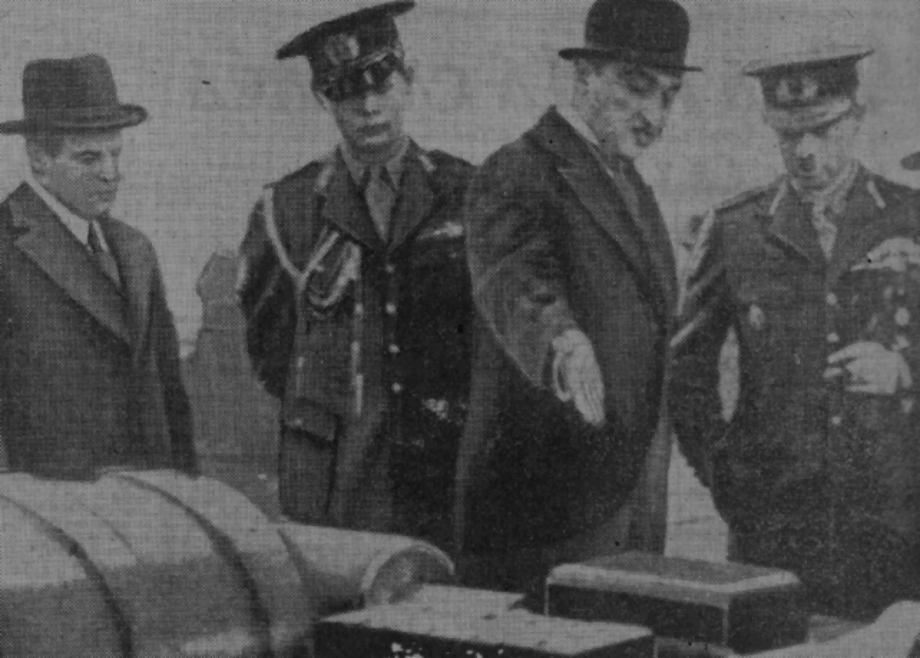
UDR visit by Carol II and his son, Voivode Michael (in or before 1938). Nicolae Malaxa is showing Carol assembly-line products; Auschnitt is present at the far-left of the image

Auschnitt was reportedly rejected by the PNȚ rank-and-file. In September 1934, a Sovata rally of PNȚ figures who supported Iuliu Maniu declared him and other figures of the camarilla to be "occult" and unwanted influences on the king. This claim was reciprocated by other dissident groups: during September 1936, the Lupist Party formally asked Madgearu why he was spending time at Auschnitt's villa in Eforie. In late 1936, rumors that Auschnitt had attended a hunting party with PNȚ leaders Maniu and Ion Mihalache were dismissed by the party press as "intended to stoke the people's animosity". Auschnitt had remained discreetly involved in political life, a sponsor of the least radical nationalist platforms, leading to paradoxes. One such "incongruity" is noted by Pandrea, according to whom the PNȚ used Auschnitt's "recent subsidies" to publish Ernest Ene's economic manifestoes. These in turn featured calls to nationalize all of Romania's heavy industry.

At a meeting of the General Union of Industrialists in November 1935, Auschnitt himself argued for tariffs on Romanian exports as a means of preventing "weak-currency countries" from competing with local factories. In August 1936, he published in La Roumanie Nouvelle a favorable review of Romania's industrial "autarky", demanding protectionist measures in agriculture and mining. With the outbreak of the Spanish Civil War, Auschnitt maintained a personal friendship with the Francoist ambassador, Pedro Prat y Soutzo. Prat claimed that Auschnitt sponsored his diplomatic mission, though, as noted by scholar Judith Keene, this too was an attempt by the businessman to appease the Romanian fascists. In August 1937, the FR's Alexandru Vaida-Voevod claimed that Auschnitt had even acknowledged employment discrimination favoring Romanians as a positive. Vaida hypothesized that Auschnitt's baptism had changed his perspective on Romanianization; he also hinted that such messaging was vetted by the PNȚ, which was courting the far-right. During that same interval, Octavian Goga noted that PNȚ figures were borrowing ideas from his own National Christian Party, and "posing as nationalist reformers, presumably with Mr. Auschnitt's blessing".

From September 1937, Auschnitt's activities became a main topic of scrutiny for the pro-fascist daily Universul, whose staff believed that he was behind Zaharia Stancu's left-wing newspaper, Lumea Românească. This claim was partly validated by another newspaperman, Tudor Arghezi, who also noted that Universul was moving away from a position in which it too had accepted Auschnitt's bribes (according to Arghezi, the industrialist only sought out Stancu after this relationship broke down). Ahead of national elections in December, Auschnitt became a Senate candidate for the PNȚ. As noted by Argetoianu, the Iron Guard believed that Auschnitt was maneuvering to set up a new government team under Mihalache, which greatly enraged Codreanu and his followers; however, the allegation was dismissed by Edgar, according to whom Max was "not up to anything". Eventually, Auschnitt retook a Senate seat in Romania's 1937 legislature. During the conflicts of that year, the Iron Guard reportedly threw an explosive device at the Aleea Alexandru villa; after this incident, Auschnitt dispatched Steve to safety in England.

Auschnitt confessed being taken by surprise when Carol appointed Goga as Premier, as the king never mentioned his plans to his poker partners. Early in 1937, he and Blank, together with Wilhelm Filderman and Armand Călinescu, had drafted a plan for the mass emigration of Romanian Jews to Mandatory Palestine. This attempt was foiled by opposition from both Britain and Nazi Germany. In February 1938, Auschnitt announced that he was giving up on politics and moving abroad, sparking alarm that he was going to create chaos by also giving up on his managerial duties. As he explained at the time, he only pondered exile because of Goga's racial laws, which were specifically targeted at Jews.

=== Arrest ===
Only days after, Carol II staged a self-coup, outlawing all political parties and replacing them with the National Renaissance Front; the antisemitic legislation, passed in 1937, was tightened and extended. This regime also formalized Carol's growing disdain for Auschnitt. The latter was still invited to join Carol on a 1938 cruise aboard the royal yacht, but, as Vidran observes, the relationship soured immediately after. Vidran believed that Auschnitt had resisted the king's demand for more control over the industry. Other accounts claim that the spat began once Livia refused Carol's sexual advances, or once Lupescu grew jealous that she would not. Pandrea alleges that "the Transylvanian tease Pordea" was publicly known as Carol's second mistress, and tolerated as such by Lupescu. He believes that the conflict between Malaxa and Auschnitt exploded when Malaxa's young daughter, seduced by Carol, came to usurp Livia's role at the court. Auschnitt himself was notoriously unfaithful to his wife, spending his money on sexual escapades in Vienna.

As reported by Jovan Dučić, in late 1938 Auschnitt and Malaxa were involved in undermining the Polish–Romanian alliance, favoring instead Czechoslovakia and the Little Entente; this was because of Poland's role in the partition of Czechoslovakia, and because both industrialists were suppliers for Škoda Works. Dučić alleges that the two men played a crucial part in preventing Romania from annexing Carpatho-Ukraine, as proposed to Carol by the Polish government. From March 1939, Carol directed Romania's political and economic rapprochement with Germany. This move alienated Auschnitt, who feared Nazi racial policies. His memorandum on the matter reached Carol and Madgearu, but had no success. The same month, Romanian diplomat Viorel Tilea, who had once served as Auschnitt's employee, attempted to engineer a government reshuffle and steer Romania back into the anti-German camp. Auschnitt was often credited as the mastermind behind Tilea's action, though Tilea himself later revealed that he was urged on by people close to Malaxa.

In July, Carol shelved the plan for an Anglo–Franco–Romanian joint venture, reportedly objecting that its two would-be managers, Auschnitt and Oskar Kaufmann, were Jewish. Later that month, Orghidan, who was seen as "Auschnit's man", was voted off the UDR board. Soon after this, Auschnitt was no longer invited to Lupescu's poker evenings. On August 18, he resigned from the UDR, citing no explicit reason. The pretext was offered by his alleged conflict of interest: Auschnitt was claimed to have tampered with a signed UDR contract in order to obtain state compensation for TNC budgetary losses. Auschnitt is cited by Argetoianu as emotionally shaken by the interpretation of facts, openly denying that the document in question was ever modified. The diarist notes that Urdăreanu, who "has a nose for these things", had come to openly disrespect Auschnitt long before heading the investigation at Reșița. This issue is attested in other records, which, Scurtu notes, show Urdăreanu constantly engaged in undermining Auschnitt's reputation. Pandrea reports that Livia Auschnitt once insulted Urdăreanu, who enjoyed Lupescu's protection.

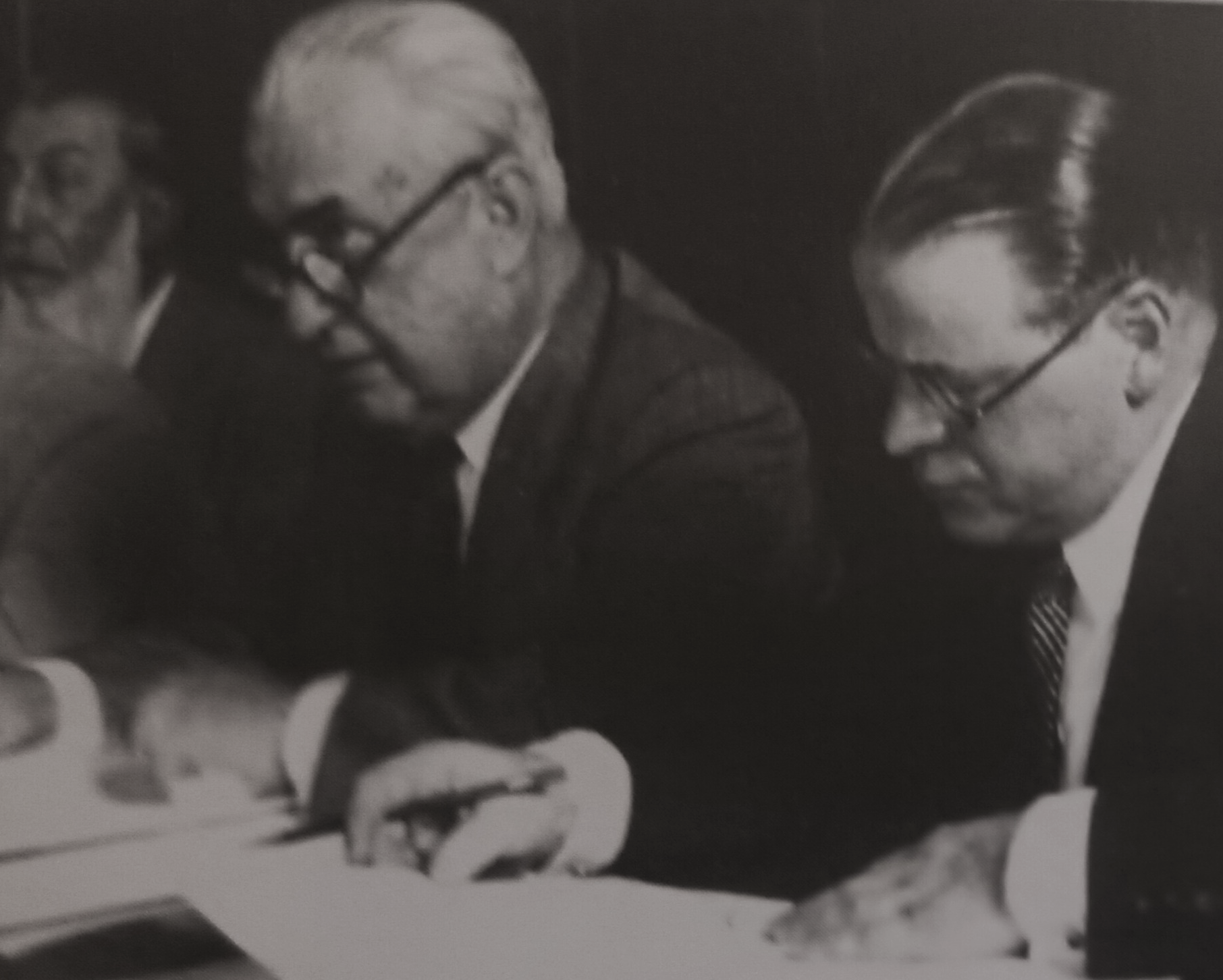
Constantin Argetoianu and Auschnitt at an UDR company meeting, July 26, 1938

As recounted by Vidran, the regime had been told by Malaxa and by a man at the UDR that Auschnitt and his relatives were using CEPI to move bullion and hard currency out of Romania, since they saw the country as prone to a Nazi takeover. Urdăreanu allegedly concluded that Auschnitt had also "clogged" the UDR with Jews and Hungarians, and insisted that this was additional proof of malfeasance. Argetoianu additionally reports that both Auschnitt and Kaufmann had by then been involved in insider trading at the Credit Bank, from which they drew a profit of 6 million lei between them. Their momentary success was offset by Edgar Auschnitt, who lost 3 million lei playing backgammon against Constantin Cantacuzino.

Commenting on Auschnitt's character in his diary, Carol surmises: "A Yid is still a Yid, no matter how nice he might be as a man." News of Auschnitt's defeat by Malaxa were recorded by socialite Marthe Bibesco as evidence that a "British pawn" had lost to a "pawn or half-pawn of the German financiers". Similarly, economist Kurt Lachmann places blame for Auschnitt's ouster on the "antisemitic campaign in Rumania, financed by the Nazis." In Germany, the Völkischer Beobachter openly celebrated the Auschnitts' downfall. Auschnitt's opposition to Nazi policies entered a new stage in March 1939, just before the Allied Powers renewed their commitment to defending Poland from Nazi encroachment. Historian R. P. T. Davenport-Hines suggests that Auschnitt may have been responsible for strengthening the Anglo-Polish military alliance in that he circulated an alarmist claim, namely that Germany had issued an ultimatum for Romania to join the Axis. In September, during the Nazi invasion of Poland, Auschnitt retaliated against the Nazis by assisting Polish refugees.

=== First trial ===
The prosecution confronted him about Auschnitt's practice of only sending the poorest-quality scrap iron to the UDR, where weapons were being produced, while the best was resold for a profit for used on steel cans at Metalunit. Auschnitt defended this as a "frequent practice in commerce". In October 1939, the king allowed Iamandi to draft new regulations for sociétés anonymes, specifically designed to harm Auschnitt; the latter was just then being interrogated by prosecutors regarding his UDR contracts. Business rivals where then allowed to engineer a trial against Auschnitt, who was accused of fraud and money laundering. Various observers believed that he was no longer willing to share his profits with the camarilla, which made him a target for retribution. Argetoianu adds speculation that Carol was resentful because his stocks in the Lujani sugar refineries, obtained from Auschnitt, had been subject to litigation; or that the king intended to please Adolf Hitler by "sacrificing his own kikes". The interpretation is partly backed by sociologist Mictat Gârlan, according to whom "Max Auschnitt, a man close to the Royal House", was arrested "only because he was Jewish." The disgraced courtier kept in his desk a document showing that Carol was fully responsible for the sugar debacle.

A "public enemy number 1", Auschnitt was also expected to relinquish his UDR shares. According to one account, he agreed to sell only if he was guaranteed immunity from prosecution and allowed to settle in France, where Livia had already relocated. A deal was reached, but Auschnitt was still arrested on the border. Argetoianu partly backs this rumor, by relaying a story allegedly told by Iamandi, according to which Auschnitt agreed to cede his stock if promised immunity from prosecution. His proposal, Argetoianu notes, was simply denied. Though selected by Carol to serve as prime minister during the same interval, Argetoianu still viewed the affair as a settling of scores, and asked not to be involved on either side. With Auschnitt's taking into police custody on the evening of November 8, the censorship office was instructed to allow the publication of "any reportage that would detail the reasons behind [his] arrest."

As Auschnitt was being relocated to Văcărești Prison that same day, Argetoianu read his grounds for indictment and concluded that his friend was not in fact innocent, though the trial he faced was likely to be unfair. Writer Radu Tudoran, who covered the trial as a young reporter, contrarily noted that Auschnitt was not guilty, and that his "concise", "hard-hitting" self-defense was proof in itself. The matter was personally handled by Gavrilă Marinescu, who was Argetoianu's Minister of Internal Affairs. He cited his "moral debt" to Auschnitt in an attempt to recuse himself, but Carol insisted that he pursue the investigation, noting that Auschnitt was symptomatic for a "corrupt system", and that a show trial would commence "the purge" of Romanian industry. On November 14, the authorities raided TNC offices, arresting general manager Constantin Naghi and four other directors who, they claimed, were "controlled by Aușnit". They also detained an unnamed witness, whose testimony allowed them to recover 10 million French francs that Auschnitt had deposited with his former father-in-law, Aronovici. Prosecutors also looked into another issue of conflicting interests, noting that Auschnitt had used CEPI to buy off UDR assets.

On December 5, a new cabinet, headed by Gheorghe Tătărescu, stripped Edgar Auschnitt of his citizenship; Max lost his four days later. Edgar had by then escaped to London, which allowed government to confiscate and redistribute his assets in Romania. Livia, meanwhile, was spotted on the French Riviera, allegedly pursuing an affair with Kurt von Haugwitz-Reventlow. Argetoianu assesses that Auschnitt's imprisonment had by then brought a great surge in the king's popularity, since the public, especially the "nationalist and antisemitic circles", could now believe that the tide was turning on his camarilla. He comments on demonstrative gestures by the authorities, which included forcing Auschnitt into the regular police van. Argetoianu also writes that "philosemites" were baffled by Carol's clampdown, and exaggerated its meaning. He illustrates this with a quote from General Eugeniu Vârtejanu, who was reportedly Auschnitt's friend: "This is the Dreyfus affair in its Romanian version".

For all his subjects' enthusiasm, the king never agreed to have other camarilla men prosecuted for their alleged misdeeds. As noted by researcher George Enache, the affair showed the power that of Romanian secret services had in influencing legal procedures, especially so since Malaxa, whose name had been cited in similar allegations, was never convicted. In February 1940, a man known as I. D. Dumitrescu publicized a full record of illegal deals involving Malaxa (who had left the country on an extended leave), but Carol ordered Marinescu not to follow up on this lead. On March 14, Auschnitt was sentenced to a six-year term in labor camps, and ordered to pay back 200 million lei (approximately 140,000 British pounds in 2016 rates). In June, while filing his appeal from Doftana prison, he made a final attempt at placating the camarilla, offering to split his UDR shares between CEPI and Malaxa's companies. This message failed to impress. His UDR stock was confiscated without him being involved. Auschnitt's shares were reportedly split between the Nazi iron conglomerate and Malaxa. According to Lachmann, Albert Göring "terrorized the Rumanian government" into issuing more shares that his firm then acquired.

=== Antonescu years ===
In September 1940, following public outrage over the Second Vienna Award, Carol was deposed and exiled, alongside his mistress; the "National Legionary State" was established as a partnership between the Iron Guard and General Ion Antonescu. The Guard opened up Lupescu's residence, reportedly showing that she still kept Livia Auschnitt's portrait. According to Petru Groza, who served time in Malmaison prison in 1943–1944, Max Auschnitt had previously been held there, and had been allowed to refurbish a bathroom—which became the communal laundry room. Antonescu was lenient toward Auschnitt, dispatching him to a sanitarium, but also continued to enforce and enhance antisemitic laws. Such policies remained unchanged when the Guard was ousted in January 1941, as Romania remained closely aligned with Germany. In April, Livia obtained that the seal be lifted on her Bucharest home, but the regime used this occasion to inspect the premises. Prosecutors reportedly found a trove of foreign currency, which they confiscated, preparing to have Max Auschnitt placed on trial for tax evasion.

In December 1941, Antonescu noted of Auschnitt: "once a kike, always a kike". He openly acknowledged that Auschnitt was in fact innocent of any crime, and favored allowing him to leave Romania if he would transfer all his property to the state; this attempt was foiled by protests from Joachim von Ribbentrop, the German Foreign Minister. Despite further outrage from such circles, Antonescu's courts commuted Auschnitt's sentence into forced labor at the TNC, meaning that he was effectively on parole. In October 1941, Auschnitt had offered to donate his share of the TNC to a state company. His proposal caused much embarrassment for Antonescu's ministers, since accepting under the circumstances would have looked like their blackmailing a prisoner. Antonescu himself intervened to chide Orghidan and Alexandru Ottulescu for stalling. In January 1942, Auschnitt sorted the issue by appointing Orghidan as caretaker of his estate, which allowed for TNC stock to be issued and bought by the state using Auschnitt's money. In May 1943, the UDR, managed at the time by Göring and physicist Horia Hulubei, reported capital gains of 37.8 million lei obtained from the Auschnitt and CEPI transactions. Meanwhile, operating through the Cisatlantic and Cisoceanic consortia, Edgar was able to purchase an interest in the Romanian munitions manufacturer, IRMC. He finally moved to the United States in early 1942. Here, a forge equipment he had ordered in 1939 was confiscated by the Office of Alien Property Custodian, and made available for use by the United States Navy.

Eventually, Antonescu's review of previous court verdicts reached Auschnitt's case. Unusually for a Jew in that context, he was cleared of the charges and released on July 3, 1942. Around that time, Auschnitt managed to transfer money from his accounts with the Swiss Bank Corporation to a cell of anti-fascist exiles in England, which was overseen by Grigore Gafencu. This stipend of 6,000 British pounds was Gafencu's main source of revenue in 1943. During August 1942, Antonescu was informed that the UDR management was running a 16-bed clinic for its 11,000 employees, and gave orders to remedy this situation. In recounting the episode, Gelu Vifor of Țara newspaper commented: "Max Aușnit and the racketeering politicians financed by that dastardly kike should take note of this truth: Something has sure changed in this country" (Vifor's emphasis). That same month, Auschnitt and Franz von Neumann donated 50 million Swiss francs to a charity managed by Maria Antonescu. This was a precautionary measure against the planned transport of Banat Jews to Nazi extermination camps, and may have contributed to the halting of all such transports. Auschnitt also partnered with Arthur Tester, whom he himself described as "naturally an anti-Semite, but a civilized one"; Tester organized transports of Romanian Jews to Palestine in exchange for Auschnitt's cash. Auschnitt donated for a "makeshift healthcare center" at the Jewish labor camp in Cotroceni, after Colonel Agapiescu allowed Maximilian Popper to provide medical treatment for the inmates.

In early 1943, Auschnitt was in contact with the American Office of Strategic Services, to which he transmitted some of Antonescu's earliest offers to the Allies. Antonescu reportedly offered to restore liberal democracy (as well as "social justice"), and also to bring about a Balkan Federation, in exchange for guarantees that Romania would maintain its 1939 borders. Around that time, Auschnitt was interned at the Târgu Jiu camp. Fellow inmates included Tudor Arghezi, who described him as "a distinguished man when it came to his relations with others". The camp also held some leading members of the Romanian Communist Party (PCR). One of these was Lucrețiu Pătrășcanu, who became close friends with the industrialist. Upon release, the latter began financing the underground movement, which now intended to topple Antonescu. His donations, formally presented as humanitarian contributions for jailed militants, reached Pătrășcanu through PCR proxies Belu Zilber and Remus Koffler. Auschnitt's relative freedom still irked Nazi observers. In May 1943, the genocidal Obersturmbannführer Adolf Eichmann was working on the case, insisting that Nazi spies were to prevent Auschnitt from leaving Romania. During the early months of 1944, Auschnitt was reportedly allowed access into the Ministry of National Economy, alongside Orghidan. He was allegedly spotted there by jurist Constantin C. Stoicescu, who exclaimed: "There is that con artist Aușnit, walking about like it's nobody's business." A piece in The Jewish Herald described Auschnitt as: "an apostate Jew, close friend of the Nazi Puppet Premier of Romania General Antonescu".

=== Second trial and August coup ===
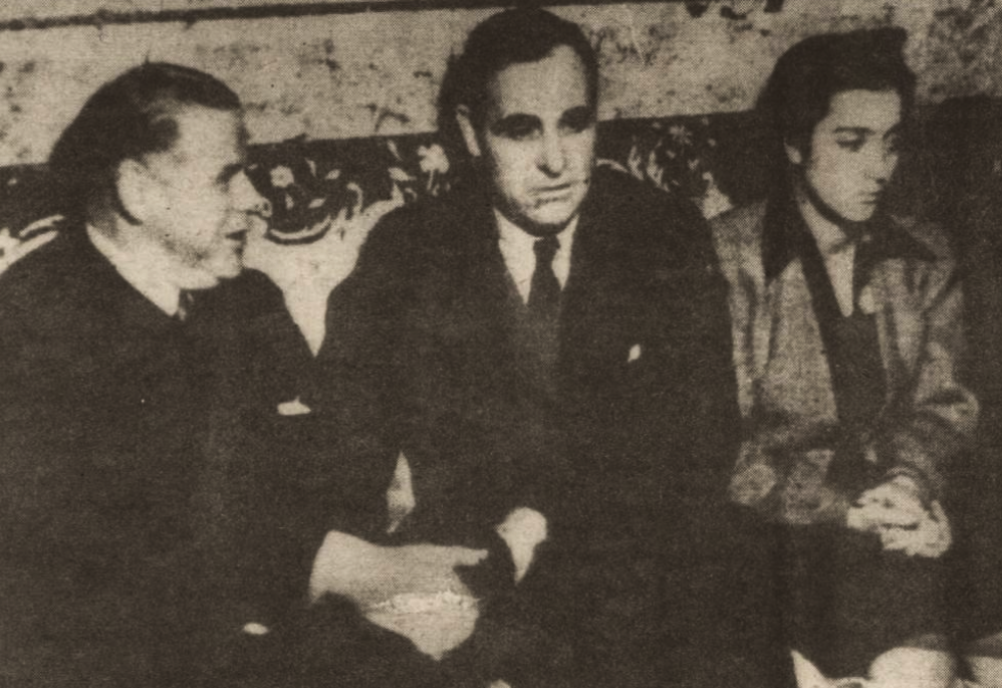
Auschnitt with the Romanian Communist Party's Gheorghe Gheorghiu-Dej attending a gala at the Soviet Embassy in Bucharest, December 1944

Also in early 1944, Auschnitt was reportedly dragged into the power struggles within the Communist Party—assisting Emil Bodnăraș in ousting its disgraced general secretary, Ștefan Foriș. He eventually caught news that Nazi envoys wanted him targeted in what was to be the final stage of Holocaust crimes in Romania. One report additionally suggests that he was briefly held at a concentration camp in Hungary. Aviator Matei Ghika-Cantacuzino, who was Auschnitt's personal friend, agreed to fly him into Allied territory. They used Ghika's Heinkel He 111, which had been ordered to Ianca. The flight, which landed in British Cyprus on June 15, 1944, also transported businessmen Alexandru Racotă and Radu Hurmuzescu. In British records, their group was code-named "Yardam", and Auschnitt was "Cocoon".

Their escape served to prepare the anti-fascist coup of August 23. Auschnitt had brought with him messages sent by PNȚ leader Iuliu Maniu, agreeing to Antonescu's overthrow, as well as a letter from Pătrășcanu. Protected by the Royal Air Force, Ghika then flew his passengers to Aleppo, where they met Maniu's liaison, Constantin Vișoianu. Auschnitt was then transported to Egypt, as he and Hurmuzescu still had to be screened by Security Intelligence Middle East, as potential Nazi spies. This referred to their links with Tester, which, Auschnitt convincingly explained, had reaped humanitarian benefits for Romanian Jews. Auschnitt was released at Cairo, but his "lavishness with money" remained a point of contention for the remainder of his stay. On July 5, a military court of the Third Romanian Army issued warrants for all fugitives. Auschnitt was charged with defection to the enemy and instigating desertion. He was then tried in absentia, and sentenced to death; the same verdict was pronounced against Ghika.

During the coup, Auschnitt's car was reportedly borrowed by Pătrășcanu, who used it to transport Groza out of Deva. Immediately following these events, Auschnitt sent letters home demanding that Antonescu aide Valentin Georgescu face punishment for his wartime activities. He also asked to purchase the archives captured from Antonescu's spy chief, Eugen Cristescu, which included minute details on communist networks active in Romania. Signaling his anticipation of a communist takeover, Auschnitt "mapped out a plan of action", including the creation of a pro-capitalist "information service within the workers' world". In September, the United States Army Air Forces flew him back to Bucharest, where he was awarded protection by the Allied Commission, and allowed to assist in reconstruction. His 1940 trial was again up for review in November, when another court confirmed his innocence. In December, Nicolae Rădescu took over as prime minister, noting with alarm that Auschnitt had resumed his conflict with Malaxa, to the point of paralyzing Romania's transport industry. That same month, when he founded a Swiss Balkan Finance and Trading Company, Auschnitt was registered as residing on Câmpineanu Street, 2. He and Malaxa both entered a new Masonic Lodge, called Lanțul de Unire, where, in 1945, they initiated Hulubei.

Auschnitt was secretly backing Rădescu's coalition against the rising PCR, who wanted Groza as prime minister. In early 1945, the two rival camps clashed in the streets of Bucharest, leading to a communist takeover. As reported by Pandrea, Auschnitt unsuccessfully supported an anti-communist counter-coup, and was identified by other participants as Romania's would-be Finance Minister. On March 9, 1945, as Groza formed a communized cabinet, Auschnitt catered champagne for a pro-communist group, the Romanian Society for Friendship with the Soviet Union, later becoming Vice President of its Economic Section. He claimed to have been approached by Soviet General Ivan Susaykov, whom he advised to recruit economic experts from outside the PCR. According to Auschnitt's own data, the Soviet state took over 30% of UDR shares as part of the reparations plan, their assistance actually preventing the factories from going bankrupt. He and Malaxa were considered for a partnership in the forestry SovRom (Soviet–Romanian joint venture), until Groza vetoed the proposal. Auschnitt, who expressed his disdain for SovRoms and for Malaxa's willingness to participate in them, had recovered some of his UDR stock. He was still prevented from reusing his villa, which was requisitioned by the Red Army in 1946.

In tandem, Auschnitt served as Vice President of a rival club, called "Friends of America". General Cortlandt V.R. Schuyler also viewed him as a trusted adviser; together, they met with Constantin Titel Petrescu of the Social Democratic Party, who reassured them that he was only allied with Groza and the PCR until a change of setting would allow him to break away. Resuming his lifestyle, Auschnitt organized a lavish party for New Year's Eve, serving crouchen and caviar to his 200 guests. These included General Schuyler and Kathleen Harriman, daughter of diplomat W. Averell Harriman. Informația Prahovei journalists commented that the event was in poor taste, at a time when Romania's children were starving; they appealed to Auschnitt's Christianity, asking him to donate more to charities.

=== Third trial ===
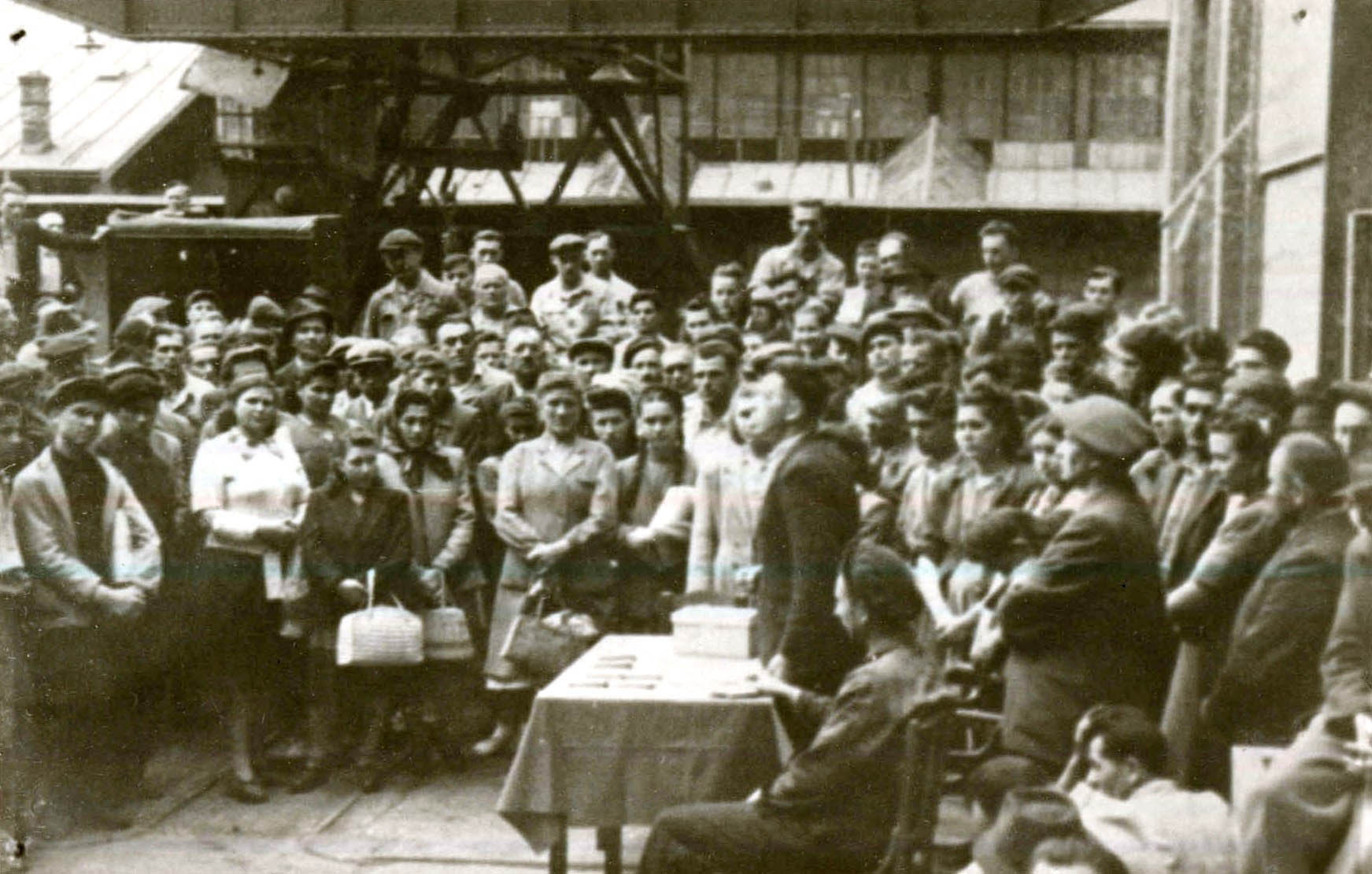
UDR workers celebrating nationalization in 1948

Auschnitt still hoped that the Potsdam Conference would push back Soviet hegemony in Romania, but reassured Schuyler that he was prepared to leave the country at a moment's notice. His offices on Câmpineanu Street was frequented by British spies Archibald Gibson and Ted Masterson, both of whom were also Freemasons; Auschnitt allegedly informed them on the state of Romania's economy. In a November 1945 interview with Mark Foster Ethridge, he spoke about the communists' zeal and incompetence as being responsible for the massive inflation. He also contended that industrial workers and peasants, wishing to be left alone, had turned virulently anti-communist. He claimed to have personally solved a labor dispute at Astra Brașov once he prevented workers from sacking the managerial staff.

Under interrogation by communist authorities, several Freemasons reported that Auschnitt and Reșița engineer Alexandru Popp, as members of the Big Finance Club, had agreed to sponsor opposition groups, including the PNȚ, in preparation for parliamentary elections in November 1946. Also to these sources, the effort was coordinated by American envoys. Alexandru Grigoriu, himself an industrialist and a Mason, noted that Auschnitt personally handled grants for Titel Petrescu and Anton Dumitriu, who had by then formed an Independent Social Democratic Party. Auschnitt reportedly approached Mihai Ralea, who served as Romanian ambassador to the US, and whom he mistakenly identified as an anti-communist, with a plan to sabotage Romania's maize production; when his offer was rejected, Auschnitt "tried to demoralize Ralea, telling him that he held information [...] that Ralea was viewed with suspicion by the Soviets."

Working as a diplomat, Gustave Pordea sensed the changing of fortunes, and opted to defect in 1947. According to historian Dinu Zamfirescu, the Pordeas were actually protected by Groza, who allowed both Gustave and Livia safe passage when their father promised to donate all his assets to the Romanian state. Gustave was sent to an "obscure post" in The Hague precisely because he could then escape, together with his "many children". Sources differ as to where his brother-in-law was living at the time. A report by the Soviet spy S. Pivovarov, issued in June 1947, claims that Auschnitt "has been in the US for over a year", and that, with Malaxa, he was attempting to channel American funding for Romania's industrial effort. Other accounts suggest that Auschnitt remained in Romania for several years, although being singled out by Groza's government as a sponsor of the anti-communist underground. As such, he was briefly detained in 1947. Schuyler finally warned him that his life was in danger, prompting Auschnitt to relocate in France at some point before August 15, 1947.

Records kept by the new communist regime suggest that Auschnitt, like Malaxa, successfully persuaded communist ministers to let him leave for the United States as a negotiator of trade deals. The allegation was stated by Ana Pauker, who represented the PCR's internationalist circles, against national-communists such as Gheorghe Gheorghiu-Dej; she implied that Auschnitt had won them over with his patriotic rhetoric. Pauker's faction believed that Ion Gheorghe Maurer was particularly at fault for the gaffe. In August 1948, Auschnitt was included on a list of exiles who were stripped of their Romanian citizenship—alongside Lupescu, Mociornița, Ioan Pangal, Ion Sân-Giorgiu, and some others. On June 11, the UDR had been nationalized, before most of it was transformed into a SovRomMetal in August 1949. In September 1948, Titan was taken over by communist workers, and renamed after Nicolae Cristea. A Jewish worker, Simion Schwartz, announced this in the wall newspaper. One of the readers approached him to ask: "Aușnit is a Jew, and so are you. Does this mean that you Jews also fight with each other?"; Schwartz responded in writing, arguing that Auschnitt sided with the "capitalist Jews", engaged in class struggle with the proletarians—Romanians and Jews alike.

A full confiscation of all property owned by Auschnitt and Malaxa, and a confirmation of their loss of citizenship, was rendered official by the Great National Assembly on October 5, 1948. On October 12, Auschnitt was formally indicted for various crimes, including high treason and conspiracy against the constitutional order, at Bucharest's Military Tribunal. A mandate was issued for his arrest, but he could not be located. Auschnitt's defection happened just before he could be implicated in a show trial against engineer Popp, himself accused of having masterminded a terrorist plot. As noted by memoirist Aurel Savin, the "judicial fabrication" was visible from the list of defendants, which included Auschnitt, a Jew, alongside the Iron Guard's Nicolae Petrașcu and wartime admiral Horia Macellariu. Contrarily, historian Lucian Nastasă believes that the prosecutors were correct in describing Auschnitt as a Petrașcu supporter, and also in identifying Auschnitt as the UDR sponsor behind a large Zionist network transporting Jews out of Romania.

=== RNC and later years ===
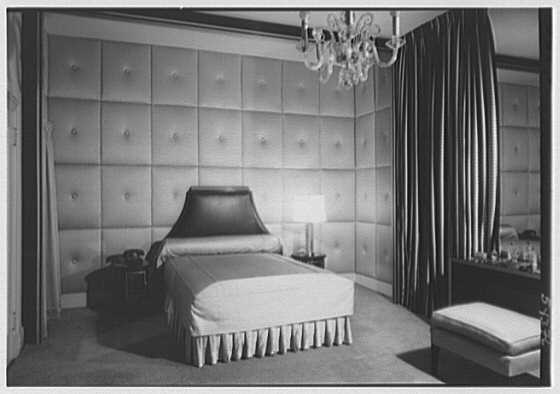
Auschnitt's bedroom on Park Avenue, 1948 photograph

The 1948 clampdown was closely followed by a purge of Social Democrats from the UDR's trade union. Traian Cercega and Georg Hromadka were arrested, while Eftimie Gherman managed to escape. Scînteia, the communist party organ, depicted Popp and Auschnitt as "common criminals who, for years on end, have been robbing and demeaning thousands of working men and women, exploiting the blood out of them." Although Auschnitt was the richest among alleged conspirators, and therefore "afforded great attention by prosecutors", his name was not included on the spurious list of would-be coup leaders. He was also the only in absentia defendant at that trial, and was sentenced to life imprisonment "for the crime of high treason" on November 2, 1948 (though believed by some authors to have received a second death sentence). Speaking at a public rally on November 1, Finance Minister Vasile Luca proclaimed that the trial had exposed Romanian capitalists for colluding against the Soviet Union and "our democratic regime's economy". This, Luca inferred, made Romanian–Soviet economic cooperation all the more imperative. In July 1952, a UDR trade unionist wrote in Scînteia that he and his colleagues had been liberated from being "exploited by Auschnitt and other bandits". Auschnitt's entire estate had by then been confiscated, and the villa on Aleea Alexandru was assigned to Groza, who lived there for the rest of his life; it later housed the Argentinian Embassy. Gazeta Literară, the communist literary magazine, took over Edgar's flat outside Piața Romană, including its furniture. The brothers' Galați home was also taken over by the state, and from 1968 was used as a museum, showcasing the labor movement in Romania.

After his departure, Max Auschnitt was mentioned in the 1954 show trial of Pătrășcanu, whom the communist leadership now identified as an enemy of the regime; his "trusted man" inside the Communist Party, Samuel Margulies, was brought in as a celebrity witness for the prosecution. The exiled industrialist lived for a while with Livia and Gustave's family in Biarritz, but grew estranged from his wife, and decided to settle as a bachelor in the US. He joined Edgar and Steve in New York City, where he acquired American citizenship, though he continued to send money to Livia and his child by her. Malaxa also headed for America, but Auschnitt repeatedly sought to prevent him from settling there. As part of this conflict, he directed a press campaign which alleged that Malaxa was a communist asset. The press he sponsored overstated Malaxa's links with the Iron Guard, including unsubstantiated charges that Malaxa's home had been a mass-murder hub for the 1941 pogrom. According to journalist Romulus Căplescu, this allegation was not proffered by Auschnitt ("a decent, common-sense person"), but was rather the product of spontaneous sensationalism.

Malaxa was finally admitted to the US in 1953, after purchasing support from US Senator Richard Nixon. Auschnitt's allegations were partly successful, in that Malaxa never applied for naturalization. Both rivals became engaged with the anti-communist Romanian diaspora, though from different angles: Auschnitt sought to align the Romanian National Committee (RNC) as an outlet for the PNȚ, while Malaxa backed the more right-wing Rădescu as leader of the movement. After negotiations overseen by the exiled king Michael I, the two wings reached an agreement in May 1949, but again quarreled and split up in December 1950. During the subsequent row, Rădescu opened a civil lawsuit against members of Michael's retinue, alleging that, on Auschnitt's orders, they had dilapidated 3 million Swiss francs from the RNC's pool. In parallel, the RNC successfully called in the Central Intelligence Agency to examine Nixon's deals with Malaxa, until Walter Bedell Smith ordered his agents to step down.

The dispute was closely followed by Romania's new secret police, the Securitate. In 1953, it took clues from a piece in the Washington Times-Herald that Auschnitt was a "guardian angel" for the RNC Chairman—his old acquaintance Constantin Vișoianu. According to Pandrea, Auschnitt had purchased Vișoianu's services, preventing him from returning to Romania, and was using "such political beggars" for personal gain. As seen by Pandrea, "Max I is the real king, having formed his own tiny court in New York." The connection was seen as scandalous by Rădescu's League of Free Romanians. Its sources indicated that there was reason to view Auschnitt as a liability, since he had been "recently implicated in a scandal with loose women." Edgar was also noted for picking up girls from Barbizon 63 and getting them to attend "impromptu parties in his Fifth Avenue penthouse, where he would entertain pals such as Cary Grant."

During his final years, Auschnitt reoriented himself toward the budding plastics industry. He and his son Steve worked on improving plastic-bag zippers (originally a Danish invention) by founding Minigrip, Inc., which, from 1951, was under contract with Dow Chemical Company. According to Căplescu, it remained a "modest enterprise", never matching the success of his earlier ventures in iron and steel. Auschnitt spent the remainder of his life at a luxurious home on Park Avenue. He died there after a prolonged illness, on January 18, 1957 (though several sources cite 1959). His death was closely followed by that of his friend Grigore Gafencu, who had also been involved with the RNC. The coincidence was noted in Scînteia, which mockingly suggested that Gafencu had "likely [died] of grief".

== Legacy ==
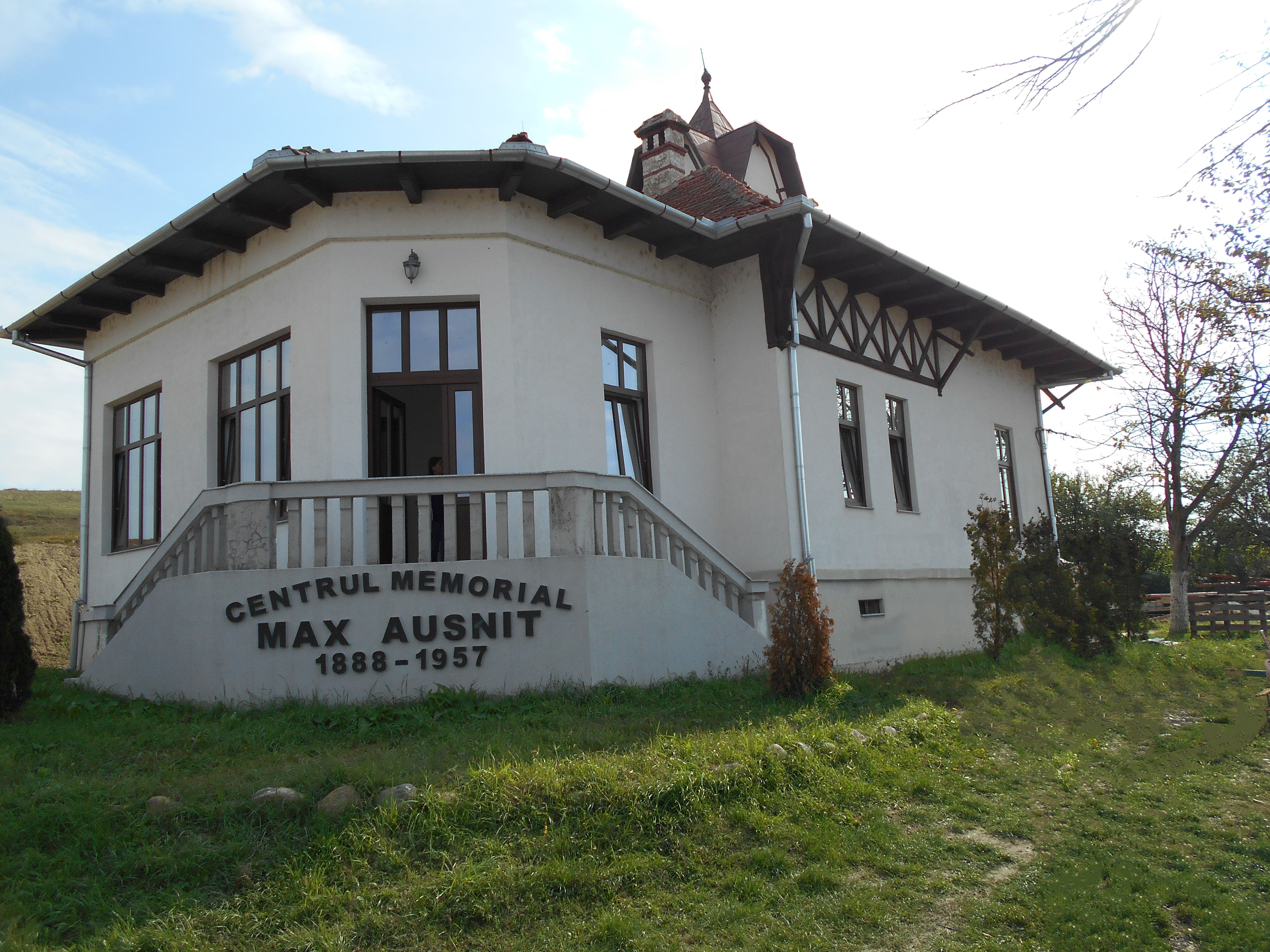
Max Auschnitt Memorial Center in Lugoj

During his final years, Auschnitt had been lampooned in Petru Dumitriu's 1956 novel, Family Chronicle, as the cuckolded and blackmailed "Leizer Gherson". Auschnitt's death was closely followed by the publication of Olivia Manning's Balkan Trilogy, where he probably appears as the banker Druker, and by I. Peltz's novel, Max și lumea lui ("Max and His World"), where he is caricatured as the eponymous Max Gros. In 1985, the Romanian communist authorities allowed Radu Tudoran to publish an autobiographical novel, Victoria neînaripată, in which he stated his belief that Auschnitt was a victim of Carol's machinations.

Gustave Pordea was left destitute by his brother-in-law's departure, and for a while only made a living selling Romanian icons of his own make. As argued by Zamfirescu, this precariousness led to his recruitment by Securitate agents, who used him to influence public opinion in favor of Communist Romania. In 1984, he became the first Romanian to serve in the European Parliament, where he represented the far-right National Front. During his tenure, accounts emerge that he was a covert agent, and that he had used Securitate funds to bribe Jean-Marie Le Pen and make his way into politics. The allegations, carried by Le Matin de Paris, were also supported by various members of the Romanian exile, including Ion Mihai Pacepa. Pordea took his accusers to court, and the claim was dropped once Pacepa refused to testify. Zamfirescu, who appeared as a witness, argues that the case was also harmed by a technicality: since journalist Agathe Lojard had called Pordea a spy, under French law she needed to prove that he had actually stolen military or economic secrets.

Minigrip, Inc. became a subsidiary of Illinois Tool Works, and was consequently re-baptized ITW Zippak. Steve Aușnit, who provided a scholarship for Romanian students at Harvard University, made returns to Romania following the fall of communism in 1989. He sponsored a Max Auschnitt Cycling Cup and promoted Holocaust studies through a Memorial Library. He was awarded the golden key of Lugoj for his investments in that city's industry, which include a freight terminal. In mid-2001, controversy erupted in Reșița after the Auschnitt and Malaxa families filed notices with the city hall, demanding the return of confiscated assets. Together with his half-brother Robert, Steve sued Fondul Proprietatea for ownership of the TNC, which resulted in some compensation for property lost during the nationalization. Robert had died by 2006, when his claim passed on to his widow, Nuria Gimeno Martinez. Steve also received back the family villa, but sold it to politician Gigi Becali in 2009; it is now noted for featuring a monument-sized gilded crucifix. The surviving Auschnitt brother continued to work in the plastics industry, filing his last patent in 2017, two years before his death in New York.
