= Dormition of the Theotokos Church, Strei =

Heritage site in Hunedoara County, Romania

Coordinates: 45.7164972°N 22.9888905°E

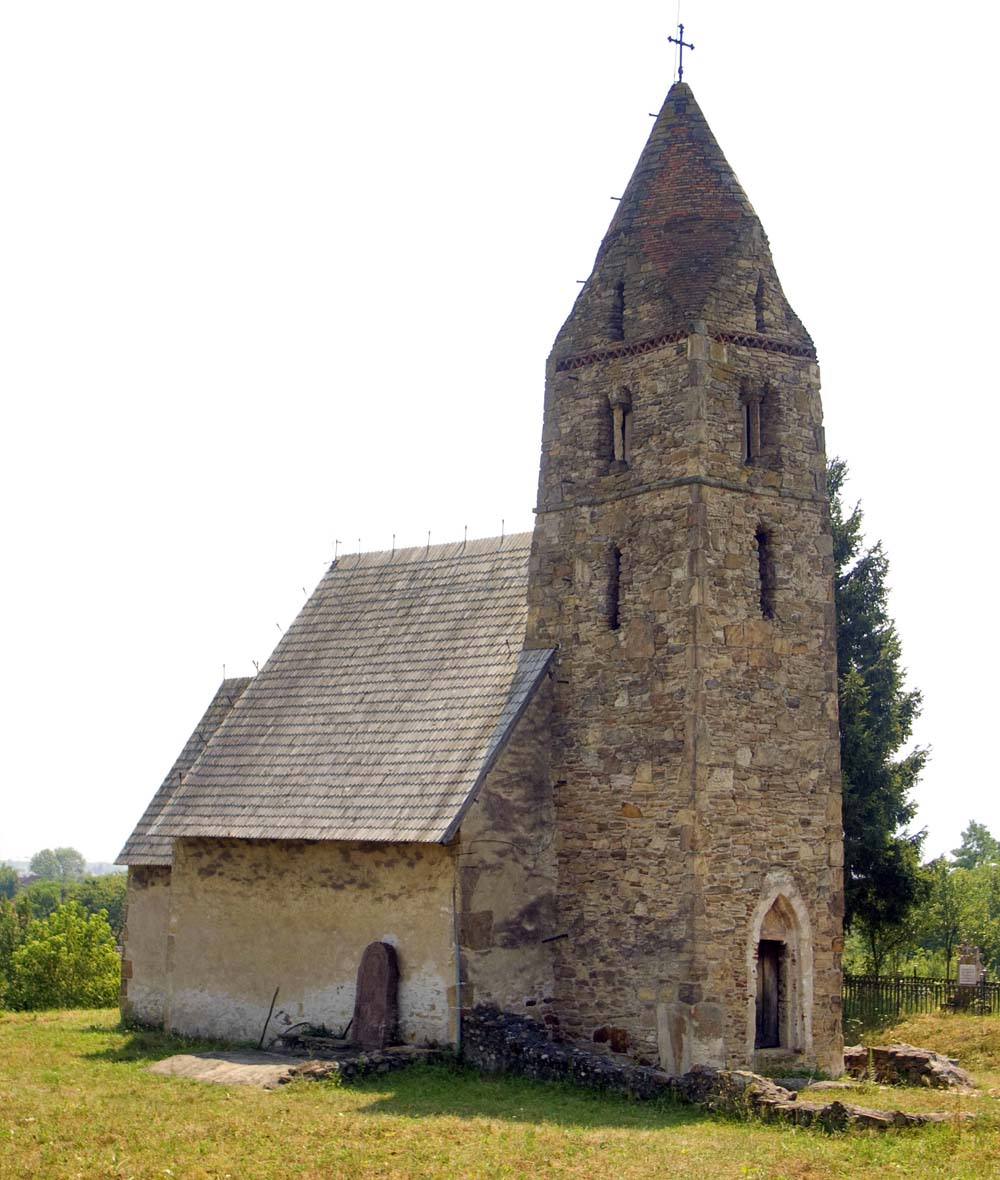
Strei Church

The Dormition of the Theotokos Church (Romanian: Biserica "Adormirea Maicii Domnului" din Strei) is a Romanian Orthodox church in Strei village, Călan town, Hunedoara County, Romania.

The first document mentioning the church dates to 1392. Traces of a Roman villa rustica have been discovered on the site. Built of stone at the end of the 13th century to serve a princely court, the church has a bell-tower on the western side, a small nave with a beam ceiling and a rectangular altar. Its exterior was formerly painted; today, interior frescoes survive. These were executed by Grozie, an artist mentioned in an inscription of the third quarter of the 14th century, and combine Byzantine iconography, north Italian elements and a strong Romanesque influence to form a unique style.

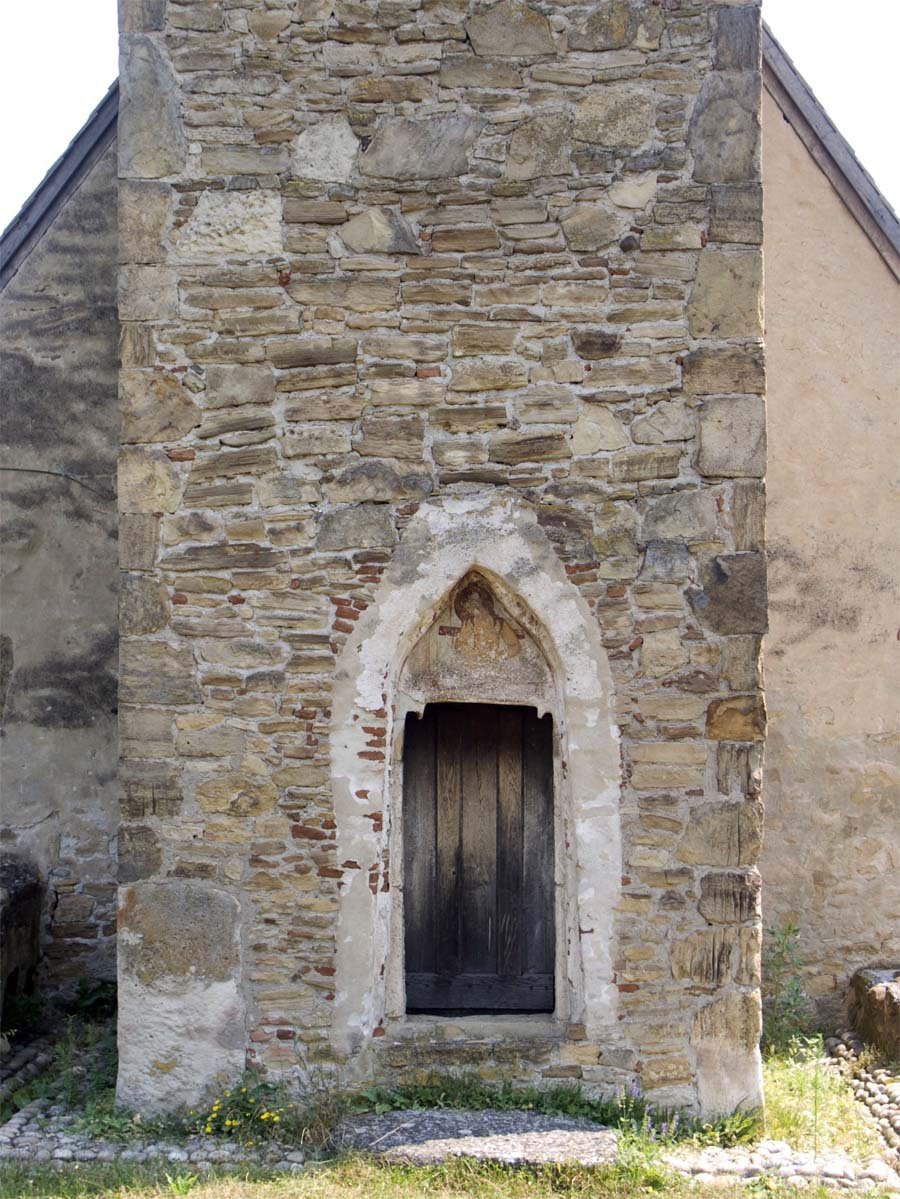
Western entrance

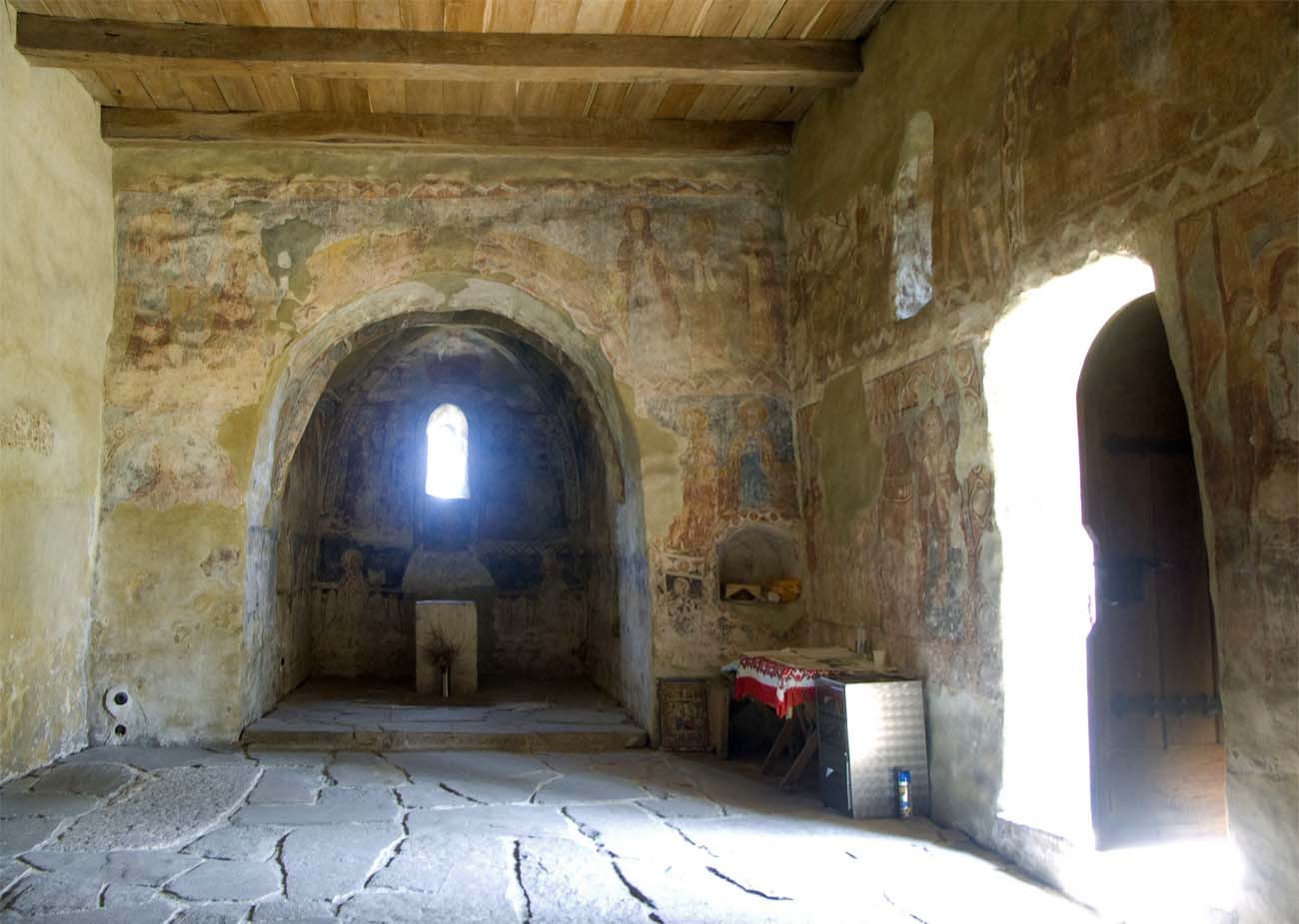
Nave

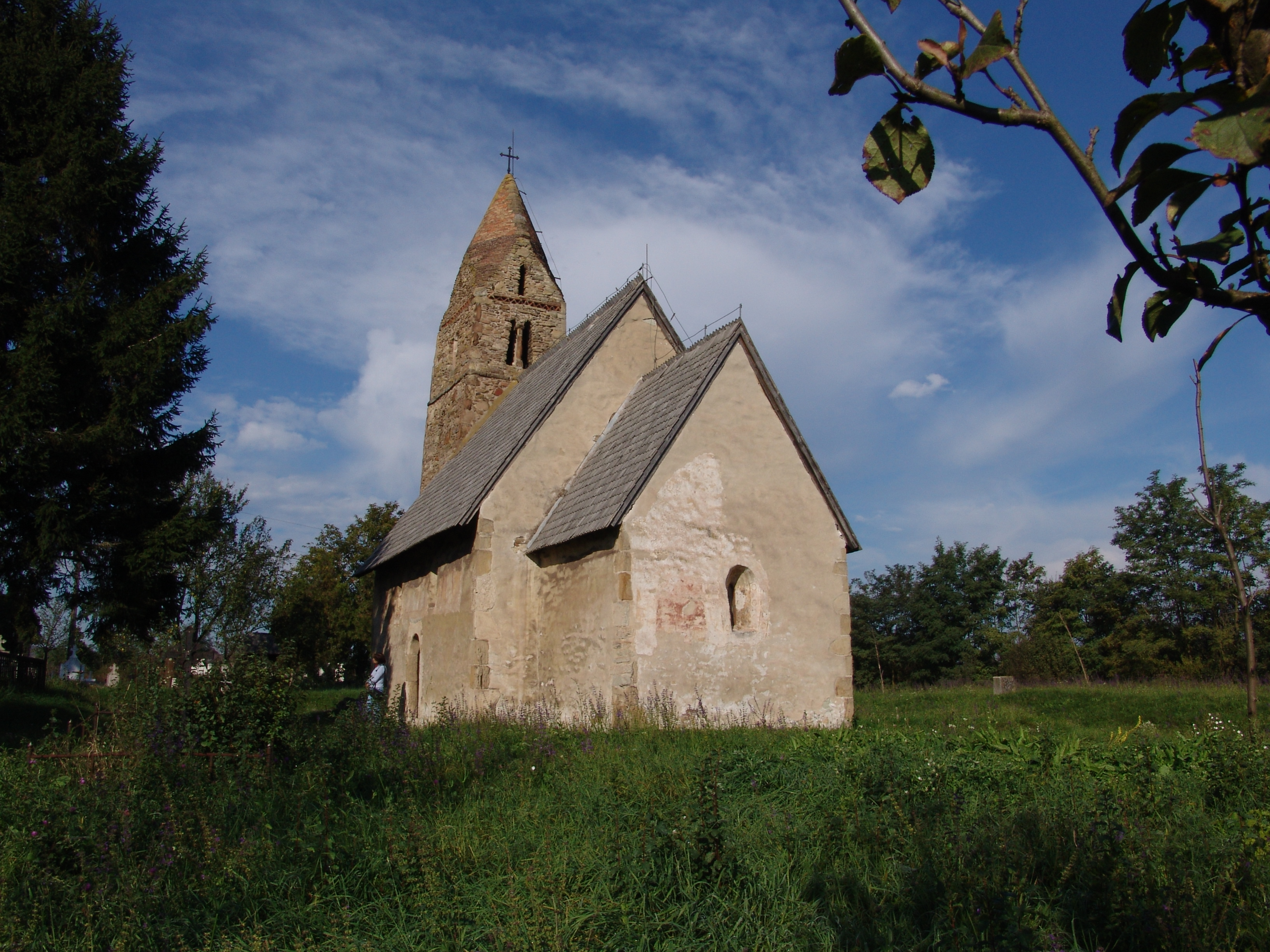
General view
