= Daniel Lăcătuș =

Romanian journalist, poet and writer (born 1988)

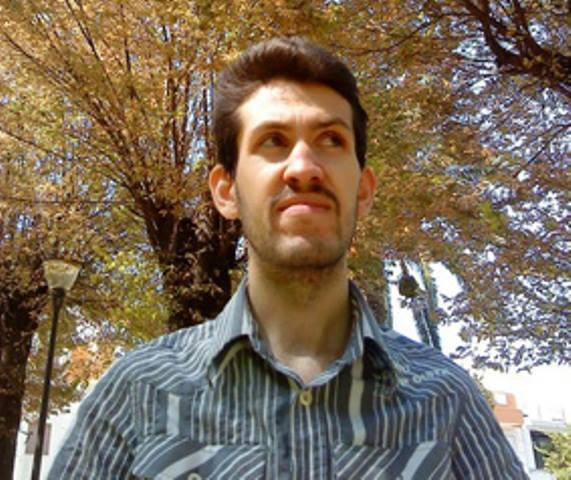
- Born: 1 April 1988 (age 38); Călan, Romania
- Education: Lucian Blaga University of Sibiu
- Occupations: Journalist, poet

Daniel Lăcătuș is a Romanian journalist, poet, and prose writer. In 2011, he became a member of the Writers' Union of Romania, Sibiu branch.

== Early life and education ==
Lăcătuș was born in Călan, Hunedoara County. He underwent primary, secondary, and high school education in Călan, later earning a degree in journalism from the "Lucian Blaga" University in Sibiu.

== Career ==
Shortly after his debut in verse in 2006 and editorially in 2008, Lăcătuș, alongside Simona Dumitrache and Adrian Diniș, emerged as a notable figure in the Romanian poetic landscape. He was recognized as a "neomodern and neoromantic" poet. His volume "cel care a transportat pustiul" gained critical acclaim, marking a turning point in his poetic journey. In 2016, his work "Femeia aceea" was translated into both English and Spanish, receiving widespread appreciation.

Beyond poetry, Lăcătuș has contributed to historical writings, particularly concerning the history of press and literature. His book on Christian poetry from the first half of the 20th century and the literary life of Călan between 1875 and 2018 received commendation.

In 2016, he authored "Presa din Hunedoara. Contribuții privind jurnalismul de investigație", capturing key events in the press history of various towns in Hunedoara County.

In 2020, Daniel Lăcătuș launched the online platform "Info Cultural" a portal dedicated to cultural news and information, both from Romania and abroad. The primary objective of this initiative was to promote and disseminate significant cultural elements on a national and international scale. His expertise in journalism is highlighted by his bachelor's thesis, which undertook a meticulous analysis of investigative journalism within the Hunedoara press. In 2018, he founded the history magazine "Apel la memorie". The publication temporarily ceased its issues during the COVID-19 pandemic. In September 2021, he founded the "Romanian Journal of Literature and Art", serving as its editor-in-chief.

== Collaborations ==
Throughout his career, Lăcătuș has collaborated with national and international literary journals, including Eminescu, luceafărul românilor de pretutindeni, serie nouă, nr. 8 (29–30), annul VI, decembrie 2006 (debut). Alte colaborări: Jurnalul Literar, Poezia, Tomis, Litere, Oglinda literară, Argeș, Cetatea Culturală, Convorbiri Literare, Luceafărul, Familia, Nord Literar, Pro Saeculum, Boema, Singur, Ecouri, Noua Provincia Corvina, Climate, Literaria, Plumb, Cuib Literar, Caiete Silvane, Ateneu, LitArt, Revista Nouă, Fereastra, Euphorion, Vox Libri, Cenaclul de la Păltiniș, Apostrof, Actualitatea Literară, Negru pe alb, Semne-Emia, Vatra Veche, Spații culturale, Sintagme literare, Algoritm Literar, Discobolul, Limba română, Revista 22, Renașterea, Revista română etc. Publicații străine: Isla Negra, Agora, Hambre (Spania), Lectorum, La Otra, El Errante (Mexic), La Urraka (Columbia), Revista LiterArte Digital, Diario de los Poetas, Mapuche (Argentina).

== Project "Fețele durerii. Apel la memorie" ==
In 2018, Lăcătuș spearheaded this editorial initiative, aiming to study and memorialize the persecution of Romanians by totalitarian regimes. The inaugural volume, highlighting individuals who perished in communist prisons, was published the same year and was well received in both academic and literary circles.

=== Literary Volumes ===
- "La templul poeziei", Editura Lumen, Iași, 2008.
- "La dictadura del silencio", Editura Mayon, Bucharest, 2009.
- "În piața agroalimentară", foreword by Elena M. Cîmpan and Melania Cuc, Editura Atu, Sibiu, 2009.
- "Preț de o clipă", foreword by Petre A. Fluerașu and Mihnea Voicu Șimăndan, Editura Atu, Sibiu, 2010.
- "Cel care a transportat pustiul", critical commentary by Ioan Radu Văcărescu (back cover), Editura Cenaclul de la Păltiniș, Sibiu, 2013.
- "Poezia creștină în prima jumătate a secolului al XX-lea. Orașul Călan", foreword by Paul Aretzu and Fr. Assoc. Prof. Dr. Constantin Necula, Editura Stef, 2016.
- "Femeia aceea/That woman", bilingual edition, Romanian – English, translated by Mădălina Bănucu, critical commentary by Felix Nicolau (back cover), Editura Stef, 2016.
- "Femeia aceea/Esa mujer", bilingual edition, Romanian – Spanish, translated by the author and Roxana Oroșanu, foreword by Beatriz Valerio, Editura eLiteratura, 2018.
- "Istoria vieții literare a orașului Călan. 1875–2018", foreword by Adrian Dinu Rachieru, notes (back cover) by Cornel Ungureanu, Aureliu Goci, and Emanuela Ilie, Editura Pim, Iași, 2019.

=== Books Published in the "Fețele durerii. Apel la memorie" Project ===
- "Fețele durerii. Apel la memorie. Volumul I", foreword by Prof. Dr. Gheorghe Onișoru. Introductory word, back cover, by academician Dan Berindei and Prof. Dr. Marian Cojoc, StudIS Publishing House, 2018.

=== Books Published in the "Să ne cunoaștem Istoria – Călan" Project ===
- "Să ne cunoaștem istoria – Călan", Editura Noul Scrib, Arad, 2010.
- "Semințe literare", literary anthology of writers from the city of Călan (coordinator), critical commentary by Dan Mircea Cipariu (back cover), Editura Pim, Iași, 2011.
- "Folclor Poetic din zona orașului Călan", foreword by Prof. Dr. Ștefan Lucian Mureșanu, Editura StudIS, Iași, 2011.
- "30 de Personalități ale orașului Călan", critical commentary by Ioan Scorobete and Ștefan Nemecsek (back cover), Editura Vertical, Alba-Iulia, 2012.
- "Călanul în imagini. Volumul I", Editura StusIS, Iași, 2015.
- "Arcade peste timp", foreword by Nicolae Stanciu, Editura Stef, Iași, 2017.
- "Biobibliografie. Ioan Gelu Crișan", Editura Stef, Iași, 2017.
- "Cioburi de suflet", poetry anthology signed by authors from Călan (coordinator), Editura Stef, Iași, 2018.
- "Orașul Călan la Marea Unire", foreword by Prof. Dr. Ioan Bolovan, Editura StudIS, 2019.

=== Other Published Works ===
- "Presa din Hunedoara. Contribuții privind jurnalismul de investigație", foreword by Assoc. Prof. Dr. Gabriel Hasmațuchi, afterword by Assoc. Prof. Dr. Viorel Nistor, Editura Stef, 2016.

=== Studies in Collective Volumes ===
- "Activități filantropice și misionare ale asociațiilor străine în bisericile creștine din România, sub supravegherea securității", in the volume "Familie, comunitate, filantropie. Biserica în perioada regimului comunist", editors: Radu Ciuceanu, Anca Natalia Rusu, Editura Cetatea de scaun Publishing, 2020.

=== References ===
Gheorghe Andrei Neagu, Petre Fluerașu, George Bădărău, Miron Țic, Menuț Maximinian, Al. Florin Țene, Eugen Evu, Marius Chelaru, Silviu Guga, Emanuela Ilie, Ladislau Daradici, Lucian Gruia, Ioan Vasiu, Ioan Radu Văcărescu, Remus V. Giorgioni, Paul Aretzu, Theodor Damian, Felix Nicolau, Alexandru Cistelecan, Sînziana Maria Stoie, Constantin Necula, Adrian Dinu Rachieru, Cornel Ungureanu, Aureliu Goci, Beatriz Valerio, Constantin Stancu, lect. univ. dr. Gabriel Hasmațuchi, prof. univ. dr. Marian Cojoc, acad. Dan Berindei, prof. univ. dr. Gheorghe Onișoru, lect. univ. dr. Viorel Nistor, prof. dr. Dragoș Curelea, prof. Daniela Curelea, Daniel Hrenciuc, Ioan Gligor Stopita, acad. Nicolae Edroiu prof. dr. acad. Ioan Bolovan, Octavian Roske, în Oglinda Literară, Cetatea Culturală, Poezia, Fereastra, Plumb, Constelații diamantine, Dacia Literară, Răsunetul, Noua Provincia Corvina, Algoritm literar, Literatorul, Vox Libri, Palia Expres, Feed Back, Euphorion, Actualitatea Literară, LitArt, Expres cultural, Spații culturale, Mesagerul Sfântului Anton, Astra, literatură, arte și idei, Caiete Silvane, Orient Latin, Replica Hunedoara, Ziarul Hunedoreanului, Contraatac, Boema, Saeculum, Rotonda valahă, Lohanul, Apel la memorie, Renașterea, Revista română, Arhivele Totalitarismului, Studii de Știință și Cultură, Acta Carpatica 4 – Anuarul românilor din sud-estul Transilvaniei etc

==== In volumes ====
- Eugen Evu, A treia carte a întâlnirilor, Editura Astra, 2009, p. 100.
- Valentina Becart, Antologie de poezie si comentarii, Editura Paneurope, 2009, p. 246.
- Menuț Maximinian, Poemul cu litere, Editura Karuna, 2011, p. 162.
- Melania Cuc, Alb pe NEGRU, cronici de (ne)critică literară, Editura Nico, 2011, p. 21.
- Menuț Maximinian, Vremea Sintagmelor, Editura Karuna, 2012, p. 106.
- Silviu Guga, Guvernat de memorii, Editura Cenaclul de la Păltiniș, Sibiu, 2013, pp. 124, 125.
- Ladislau Daradici, Rezervor. Despre frumusețea imaginației poetice, Editura eLiteratura, București, 2017, pp. 117–124.
- Gabriel Hasmațuchi, Alternative culturale, Editura Techno Media, Sibiu, 2018, pp. 157–162;

== Bibliografie ==
- Literatura română. Dicționarul autorilor români contemporani, coordonator Alina Kristinka, Editura Arial, Ploiești, 2013, p. 156.
- Județul Hunedoara: monografie, volumul V, Personalități Hunedorene, coordonatori: Ioan Sebastian Bara, Ioachim Lazăr, Paulina Popa, Marcela Balazs, Denisa Toma, Editura Emia, Deva, 2015, p. 470
- Un dicționar al scriitorilor români contemporani, volumul I, coordonator Ioan Holban, Editura Tipo Moldova, Iași, 2016, pp. 339–348
- Istoria Literaturii Române Contemporane 2018. O viziune în actualitatea literară românească, coord. Gabriela Verban, Editura Verbaniana, 2018, pp. 64–71.
- Enciclopedia scriitorilor români contemporani de pretutindeni, (în propria lor viziune), coordonatori: acad. Mihai Cimpoi, Traian Vasilcău, Tipografia Centrală, Chișinău, 2019, pp. 575, 576.
