= Călan =

- Town
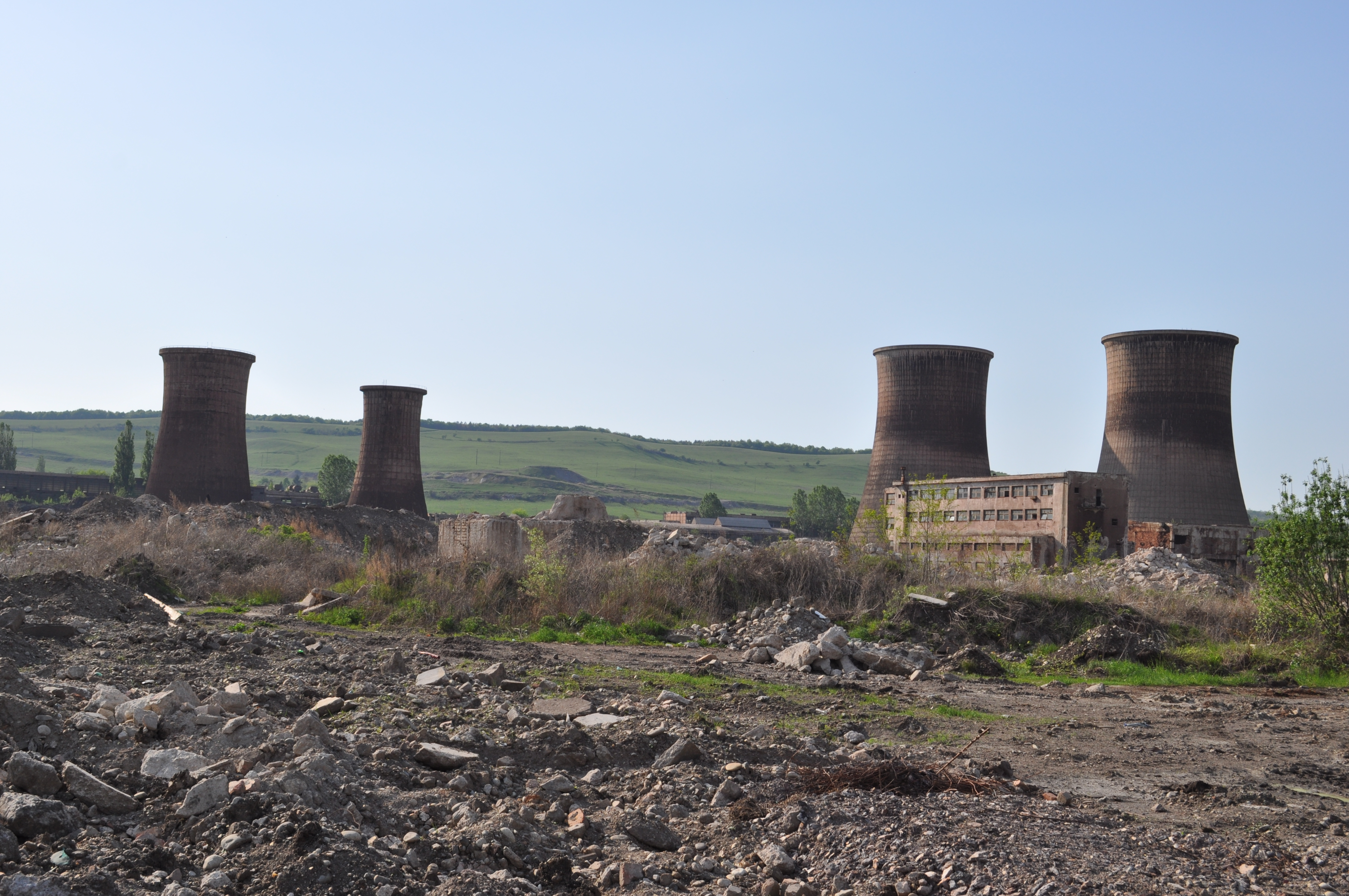
- Abandoned buildings of the Călan steel works

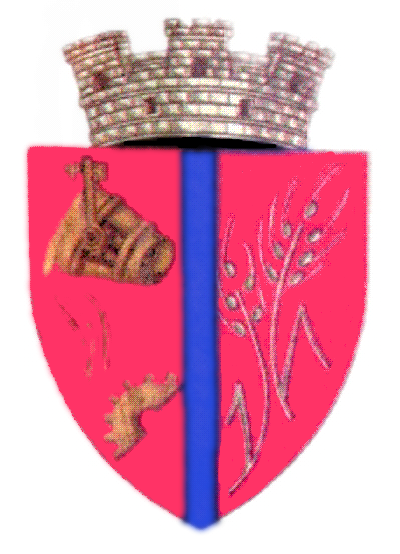
- Coat of arms

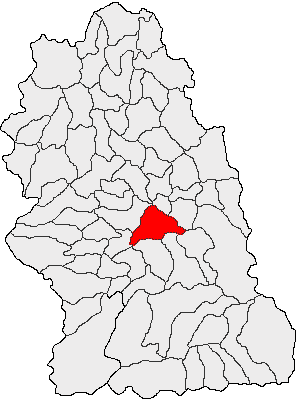
- Location in Hunedoara County

- Location in Romania
- Coordinates: 45°43′55″N 23°01′29″E
- Country: Romania
- County: Hunedoara

Government
  - Mayor (2024–2028): Adrian-Filip Iovănesc (PNL)
- Area: 101.55 km^{2} (39.21 sq mi)
- Elevation: 230 m (750 ft)
- Population (2021-12-01): 10,055
  - Density: 99.015/km^{2} (256.45/sq mi)
- Time zone: UTC+02:00 (EET)
  - Summer (DST): UTC+03:00 (EEST)
- Postal code: 335300
- Area code: +(40) 0254
- Vehicle reg.: HD
- Website: www.primariacalan.ro

Călan (Romanian pronunciation: [kəˈlan]; German: Klandorf; Hungarian: Pusztakalán) is a town in Hunedoara County, Romania. Twelve villages are administered by the town: Batiz (Batiz), Călanu Mic (Kiskalán), Grid, Nădăștia de Jos (Alsónádasd), Nădăștia de Sus (Felsőnádasd), Ohaba Streiului (Sztrigyohába), Sâncrai (Szentkirály), Sântămăria de Piatră (Kőboldogfalva), Strei (Zeikdorf; Zeykfalva), Strei-Săcel (Sztrigyszacsal), Streisângeorgiu (Sztrigyszentgyörgy), and Valea Sângeorgiului (Szentgyörgyválya).

== Geography ==
The town is located in the central part of the county, in the historical Țara Hațegului region. It lies in the Strei River valley, at 230 m (750 ft) altitude.

Călan is crossed by the DN66 national road, Călan is located 10 km (6.2 mi) from Hunedoara, 15 km (9.3 mi) from Simeria, and 28 km (17 mi) from the county seat, Deva. The Călan railway station serves the CFR rail line connecting Simeria to Petroșani.

== Population ==
Historical population
Year	Pop.	±%
1850	5,474	—
1910	7,272	+32.8%
1966	11,761	+61.7%
1977	12,397	+5.4%
1992	14,738	+18.9%
2002	14,714	−0.2%
2011	11,279	−23.3%
2021	10,055	−10.9%
Source: Census data

At the 2021 census, Călan had a population of 10,055; of those, 82.51% were Romanians and 3.23% Hungarians. At the census from 2011, the population of the town was 11,279, with breakdown as follows.

- Sorted by nationality (respondents for whom data was available):
  - 9,716 Romanians (92.17%)
  - 525 Hungarians (4.98%)
  - 161 Romani (1.52%)
  - 99 Germans (0.93%)
- Sorted by religion:
  - 10,788 Orthodox
  - 1,199 Roman Catholic
  - 399 Greek Catholic
  - 200 Reformed

== History ==
- There was a village in Dacia known as Aquae. Archaeological evidence shows that the place was inhabited for a long time.
- 1387 - First mentioned in a document.
- 1961 - Călan became a town.

Ponts of interest include the Călan steel works, the Strei Church and the Streisângeorgiu Church.

== Natives ==
- Gheorghe Barbu (born 1951), Romanian politician
- Daniel Lăcătuș (born 1988), Romanian journalist, poet and writer
- Florin Oancea (born 1968), Romanian politician
- Antal Orbán, (1887-1940), Hungarian sculptor
- Carol Stanciu (born 1938), Romanian doctor, honorary member of the Romanian Academy
- István Szőts (1912–1998), Hungarian movie director
- Romulus Zăroni (1906–1962), Romanian politician
