= Saint George's Church, Streisângeorgiu =

Heritage site in Hunedoara County, Romania

Coordinates: 45.728944°N 23.022591°E

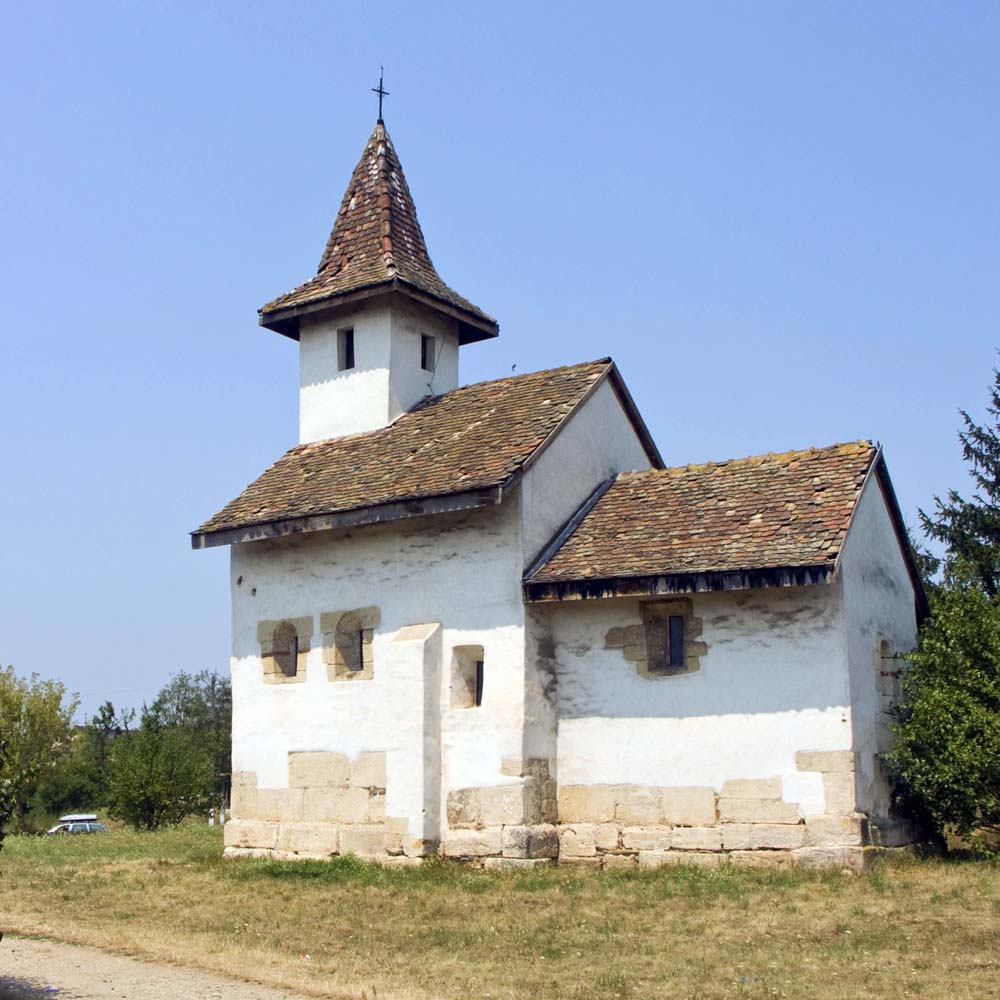
Streisângeorgiu Church

Saint George's Church (Romanian: Biserica Sfântu Gheorghe din Streisângeorgiu) is a Romanian Orthodox church in Streisângeorgiu village, Călan town, Hunedoara County, Romania.

The church was begun at the end of the 11th century and has a simplified Romanesque nave. There is a bell-tower on the eastern side, built of stone blocks held together by mortar. The altar, also facing east, is rectangular.

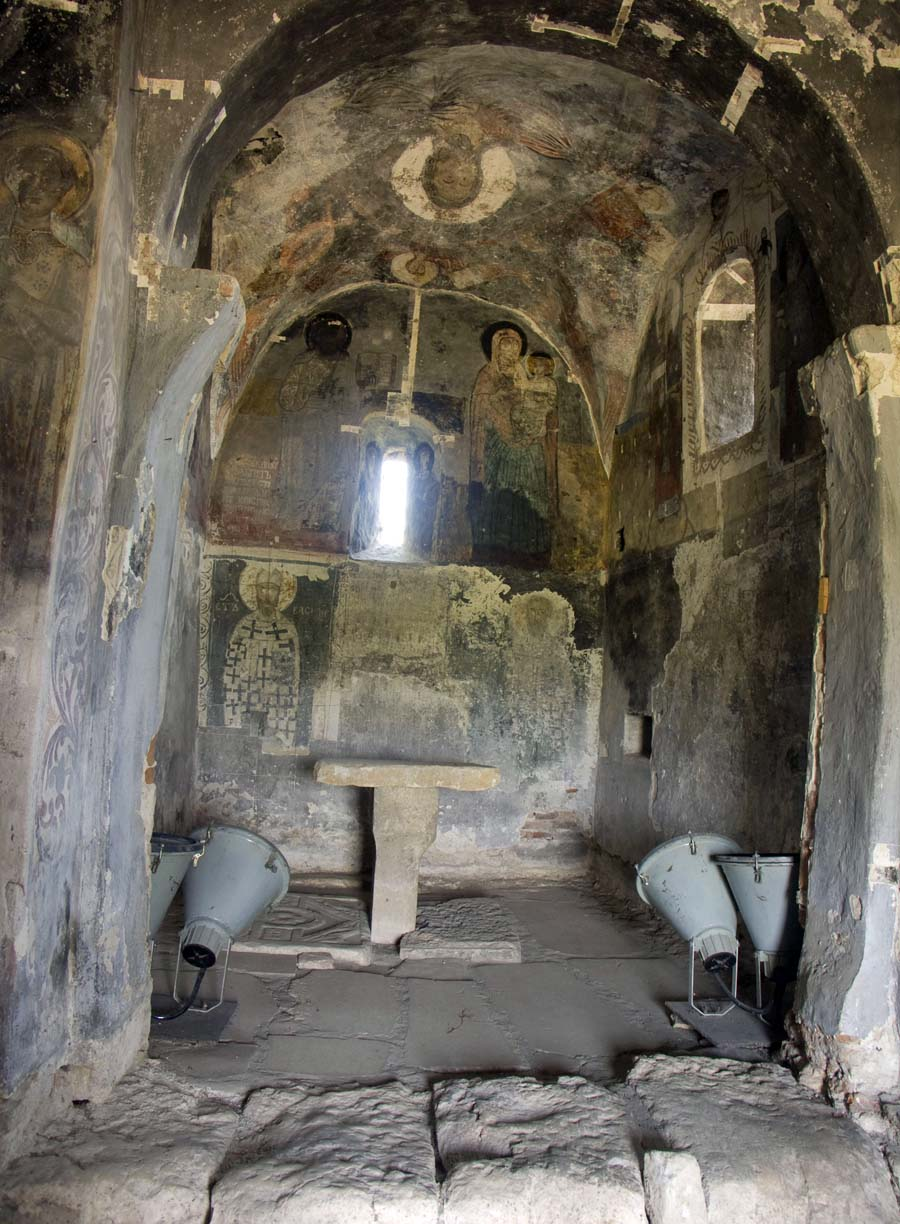
Sanctuary

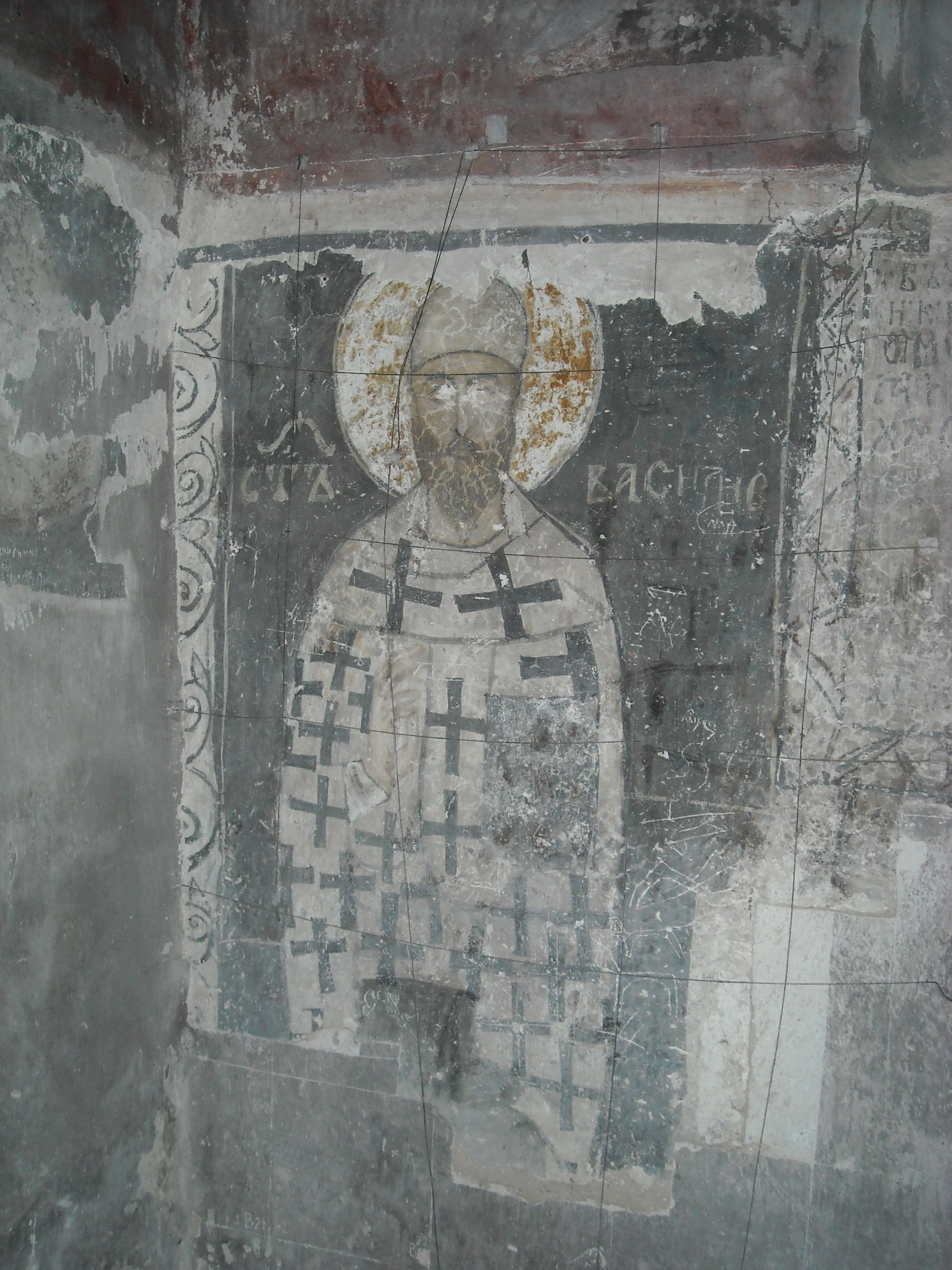
Saint Basil icon

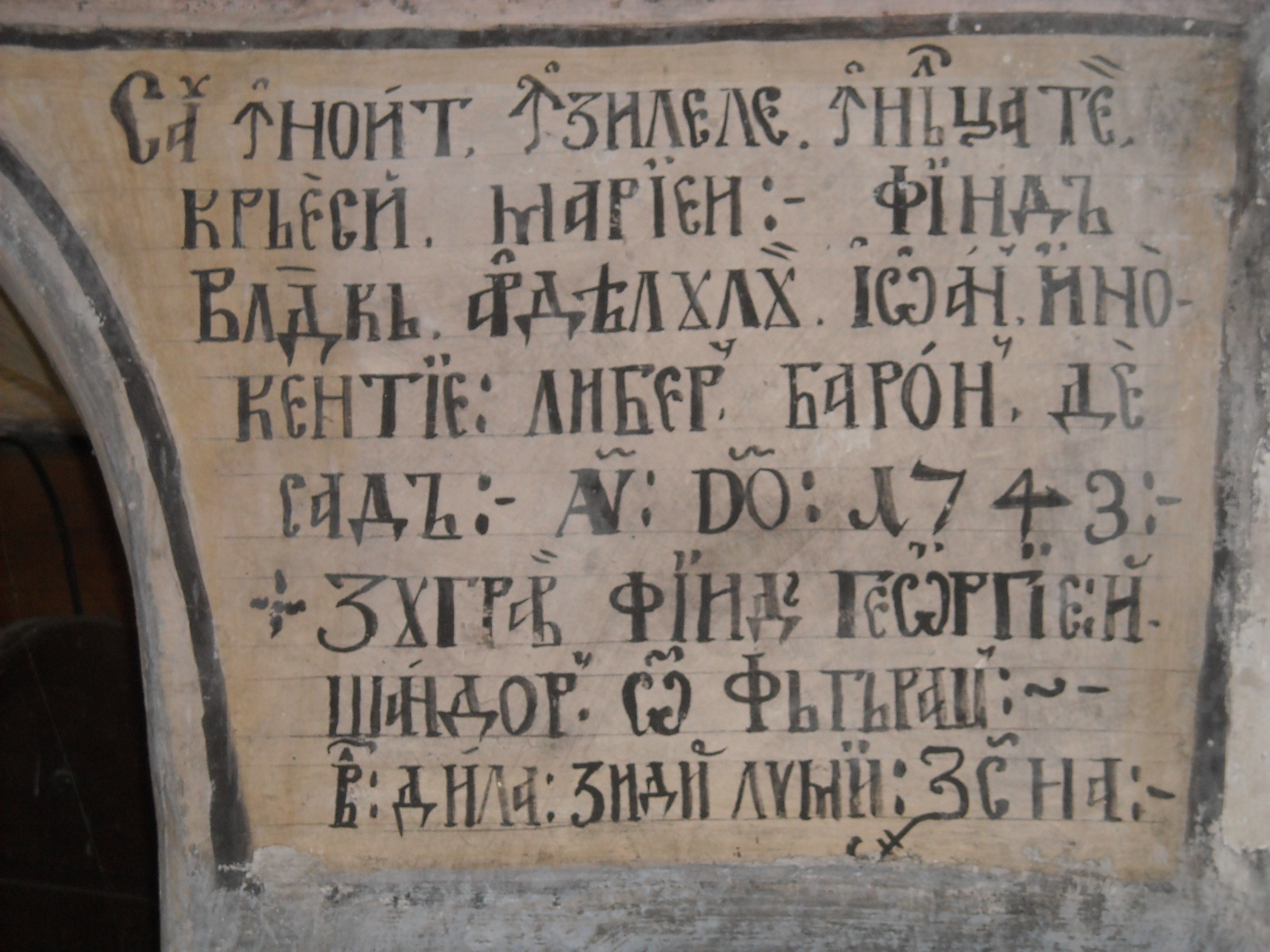
1743 inscription
