= Răchita =

Răchita may refer to several places in Romania:

- Răchita, a village in Săsciori Commune, Alba County
- Răchita (Hungarian: Rekettyó), a village in Șopotu Nou Commune, Caraș-Severin County
- Răchita (Rekettyő), a village in Dumbrava Commune, Timiș County
- Răchita, a tributary of the Bașeu in Botoșani County
- Răchita (Borod), a tributary of the Borod in Bihor County
- Răchita, a tributary of the Crivadia in Hunedoara County
- Răchita, a tributary of the Dâmbovița in Argeș County
- Răchita, a tributary of the Horezu
- Răchita (Nera), a tributary of the Nera in Caraș-Severin County
- Răchita, a tributary of the Brabova in Dolj County
- Răchita, a tributary of the Râul Mare in Alba County
- Răchita, a tributary of the Râul Mic in Alba County
- Răchita, a tributary of the Volovăț in Botoșani County
- Valea Răchitelor, a tributary of the Barcău in Sălaj County

== See also ==
- Răchiți
- Răchitiș (disambiguation)
- Răchițele (disambiguation)
- Răchitova (disambiguation)
- Răchitoasa (disambiguation)
