= Muncuqlu (disambiguation) =

Muncuqlu or Mundzhuglu or Muncuglu may refer to:

- Muncuqlu, Azerbaijan
- Mundzhuglu, Azerbaijan

== See also ==
- Muncel (disambiguation)
