= Boșorog =

- Location within Romania

Location
- Country: Romania
- Counties: Alba County

Physical characteristics
- Source: Șureanu Mountains
- Mouth: Râul Mare
  - coordinates: 45.6632°N 23.5009°E
- Length: 12 km (7.5 mi)
- Basin size: 49 km^{2} (19 sq mi)

Basin features
- Progression: Râul Mare→ Cugir→ Mureș→ Tisza→ Danube→ Black Sea
- Tributaries
  - left: Untu, Șâpca
  - right: Pârva

The Boșorog (in its upper course also: Gropșoara) is a left tributary of the Râul Mare in Romania. Its source is located in the Șureanu Mountains. It flows into the Râul Mare upstream from the Canciu dam. Its length is 12 km (7.5 mi) and its basin size is 49 km^{2} (19 sq mi).
