= Grădiștea Muncelului-Cioclovina Natural Park =

- Parcul Natural Grădiștea Muncelului-Cioclovina
- IUCN category V (protected landscape/seascape)
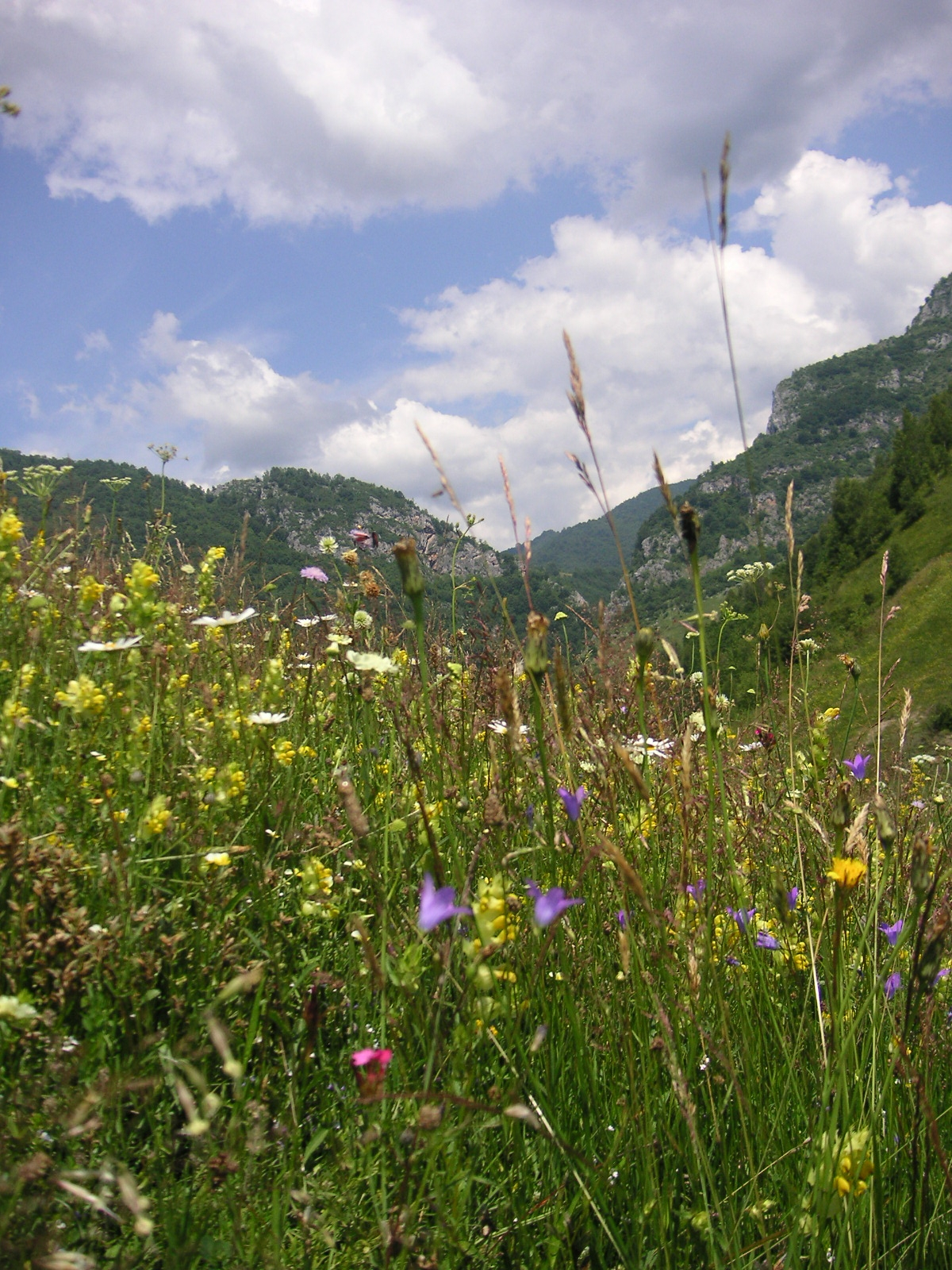
- Șureanu Mountains

- Location within Romania
- Location: Romania; Hunedoara County
- Nearest city: Petrila
- Coordinates: 45.571°N 23.231°E
- Area: 38.184 hectares (94.35 acres)
- Established: 2000, designation 1979

The Grădiștea Muncelului-Cioclovina Natural Park (Romanian: Parcul Natural Grădiștea Muncelului-Cioclovina) is a protected area (natural park category V IUCN) situated in Romania, in Hunedoara County.

== Location ==
The Natural Park is located in the Șureanu Mountains (Southern Carpathians), in the central-southern part of Hunedoara County, in the administrative territory of the communes Baru, Boșorod, Bănița, Orăștioara de Sus, and Pui.

== Description ==
Grădiștea Muncelului-Cioclovina Natural Park has an area of 38.184 ha (94.35 acres), and was declared a natural protected area by the Law Number 5 on March 6, 2000 (published in Romanian Official Paper Number 152 on April 12, 2000) and represents a mountainous area which includes forests, mountain peaks, pastures, meadows, valleys, karst areas, caves, and canyons that shelters a variety of flora and fauna.

Protected areas included in the park: Ponorâci-Cioclovina Karstic Complex (1.50 ha), Tecuri Cave (2 ha), Șura Mare Cave (5 ha), Bolii Cave (0.50 ha), Crivadia Canyon (10 ha), and Fossil Reserve Ohaba-Ponor (10 ha).
