= ITU (disambiguation) =

ITU is the International Telecommunication Union, an agency of the United Nations.

ITU or Itu may also refer to:

== Organisations ==
- Institute for Transuranium Elements, in Karlsruhe, Germany
- International Triathlon Union
- International Typographical Union, a labor union

=== Education ===
- Information Technology University, Pakistan
- International Technological University, in San Jose, California
- Istanbul Technical University, Turkey
- IT University of Copenhagen, Denmark
- Instytut Techniczny Uzbrojenia, predecessor of the Military Institute of Armament Technology, Poland

== Places ==
- Itu, São Paulo, a municipality in Brazil
- Itu River, Brazil
- Yidu or Itu, a county-level city in China
- Itu, Nigeria, a local government area

== Other uses ==
- Itu (surname)
- ITU TV, a Turkish television station
- Intensive treatment unit or intensive therapy unit, a hospital department

== See also ==
- ITU country code (disambiguation)
- ITU-R (ITU Radiocommunication Sector), a sector of the International Telecommunication Union
- ITU-T (ITU Telecommunication Standardization Sector), a sector of the International Telecommunication Union
