= Strei =

Strei Sztrigy, Râul Petros
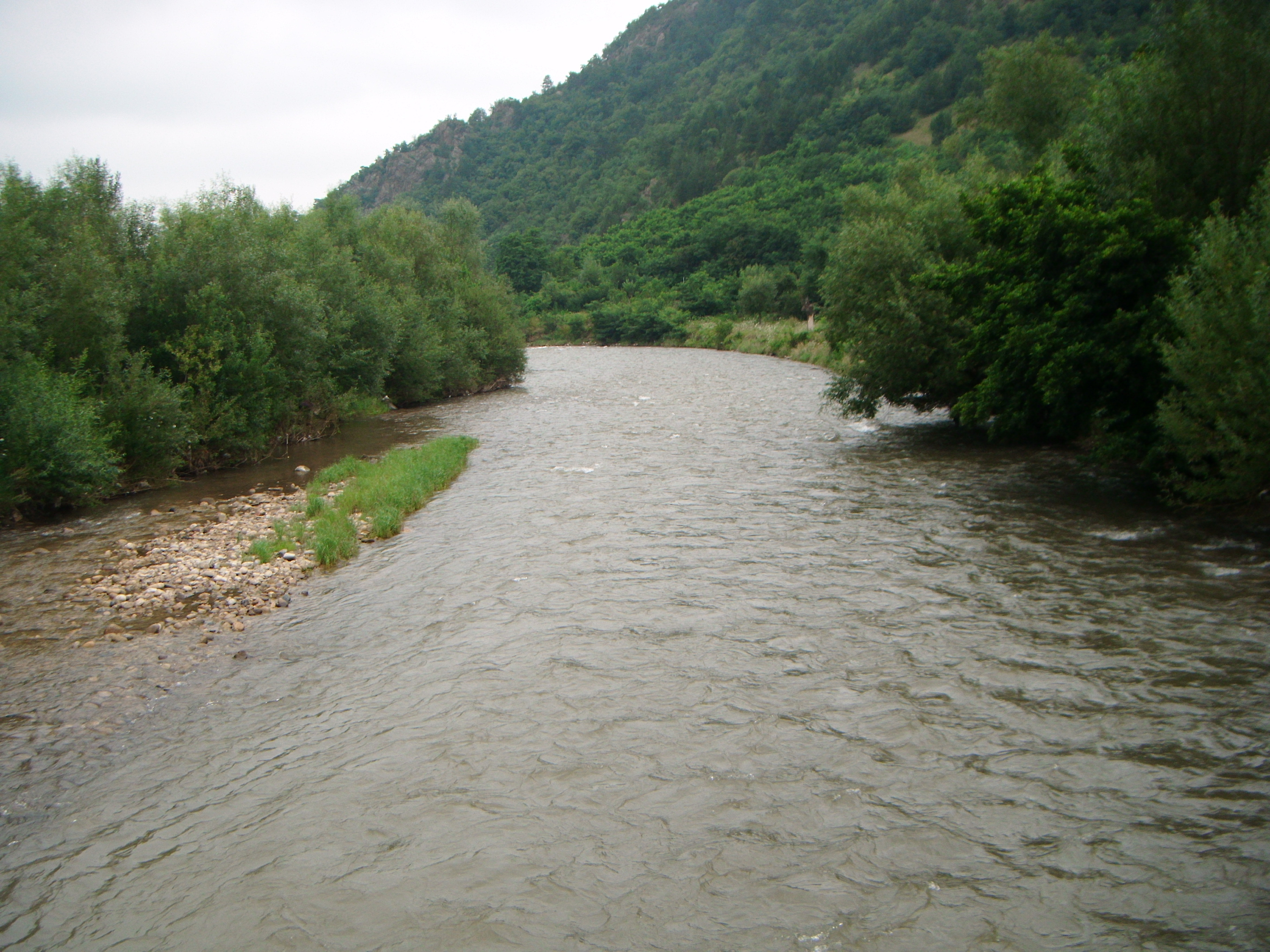
- The Strei in Ohaba de sub Piatră

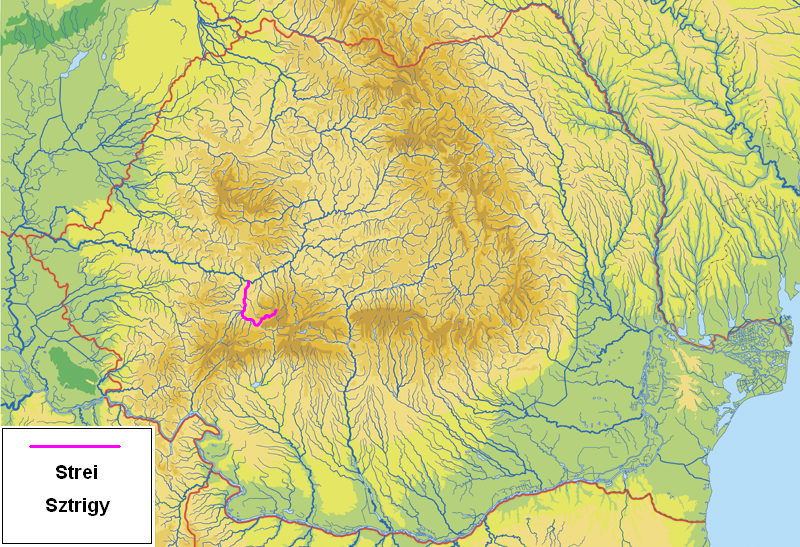

Location
- Country: Romania
- Counties: Hunedoara County
- Towns: Călan

Physical characteristics
- Source: Mount Bătrâna
  - location: Șureanu Mountains
- Mouth: Mureș
  - location: near Simeria
  - coordinates: 45.8514°N 23.0507°E
- Length: 93 km (58 mi)
- Basin size: 1,983 km^{2} (766 sq mi)

Basin features
- Progression: Mureș→ Tisza→ Danube→ Black Sea
- Tributaries
  - left: Bărbat, Râul Mare
  - right: Valea Luncanilor

The Strei (Hungarian: Sztrigy) is a left tributary of the river Mureș in Transylvania, Romania. The upper reach of the river, upstream of the village of Baru, is also known as Râul Petros. It flows through the town Călan and the villages Petros, Baru, Livadia, Pui, Galați, Băiești, Ohaba de sub Piatră, Ciopeia, Subcetate, Covragiu, Bretea Română, Bretea Streiului, Ruși, Strei, Streisângeorgiu, Batiz, Băcia and Simeria Veche. It discharges into the Mureș near Simeria. Its length is 93 km (58 mi) and its basin size is 1,983 km^{2} (766 sq mi).

== Tributaries ==
The following rivers are tributaries to the river Strei (from source to mouth):

- Left: Sasu, Jigureasa, Jiguroșița, Crivadia, Bărușor, Valea Verde, Bărbat, Rușor, Râul Alb, Paroș, Sălaș, Râul Mare, Silvaș, Valea Râpelor, Nădăștia, Sâncrai
- Right: Ohaba, Văratec, Valea Mare, Valea Tiliilor, Gânțaga, Valea Voinii, Valea Luncanilor, Săcel, Valea Făgetului

== See also ==
- Decebalus Treasure
