= Rusor =

Rusor may refer to:

- Rusina, a Roman deity
- Rusor, a Roman deity
- Ruşor (disambiguation), in Romania
