= Mălăiești =

Mălăiești may refer to the following places:

== Romania ==
- Mălăiești, a village in Sălașu de Sus Commune, Hunedoara County
- Mălăiești, a village in Râfov Commune, Prahova County
- Mălăiești, a village in Vutcani Commune, Vaslui County

== Moldova ==
- Mălăiești, Orhei, a commune in Orhei district
- Mălăiești, Transnistria, a commune in Transnistria
- Mălăiești, a village in Bălăbănești Commune, Criuleni district
- Mălăiești, a village in Gălășeni Commune, Rîșcani district

== See also ==
- Mălăiești River
- Mălădia
- Mălăești
