= Chișag =

Chișag may refer to the following rivers in Romania:

- Chișag, a tributary of the Cugir in Alba County
- Chișag, a tributary of the Cormoș in Covasna County
