= Farkaspatak =

Farkaspatak is the Hungarian name for two villages in Romania:

- Lupoaia village, Holod Commune, Bihor County
- Valea Lupului village, Baru Commune, Hunedoara County
