= Silvaș River =

Silvaș River may refer to:

- Silvaș River (Rica), in Covasna County, Romania
- Silvaș River (Strei), in Hunedoara County, Romania
