= Păltinei River =

Păltinei River may refer to several rivers in Romania:

- Păltinei, a tributary of the Râul Mare in Alba County
- Păltinei, a tributary of the Scărișoara in Gorj County
- Păltinei, a tributary of the Tismana in Gorj County
