= Rușor =

Ruşor may refer to several places in Romania:

- Rușor (Hungarian: Rusor), a village in Pui Commune, Hunedoara County
- Rușor, a village in Copalnic-Mănăștur Commune, Maramureș County
- Rușor (river), a river in Hunedoara County
