= Muncelu =

Muncelu may refer to several places in Romania:

== Populated places ==
- Muncelu, a village in the town of Baia de Arieș, Alba County
- Muncelu, a village in Glăvănești Commune, Bacău County
- Muncelu, a village in Ion Creangă Commune, Neamţ County
- Muncelu, a village in Străoane Commune, Vrancea County
- Muncelu de Jos, a village in Valea Ursului Commune, Neamţ County
- Muncelu de Sus, a village in Mogoșești-Siret Commune, Iași County

== Rivers ==
- Muncel, a tributary of the Crivaia in Hunedoara County
- Muncelu, another name for the Latorița de Mijloc River in Vâlcea County
- Muncelu, a tributary of the Pogoana in Sibiu County
- Muncelu, a tributary of the Suha in Suceava County

== See also ==
- Muncel (disambiguation)
