= Roșia Poieni copper mine =

Copper mine in Romania

Roșia Poieni mine
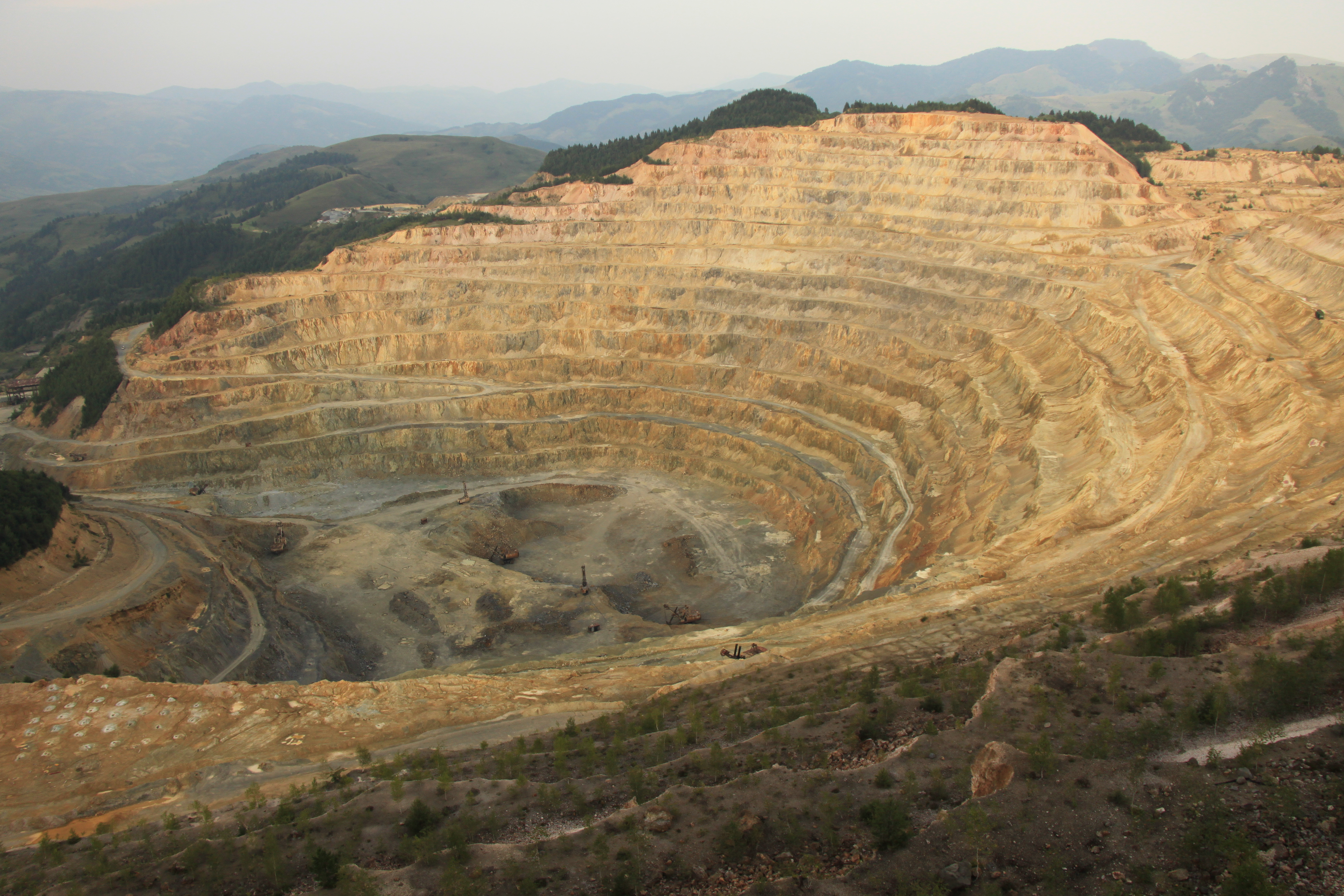

- Location in Romania
- Location: Roşia Montană, Alba County, Romania; 46°18′53″N 23°10′17″E
- Products: Copper
- Production: 11,000 tonnes
- Financial year: 2008
- Opened: 1929
- Company: CupruMin

The Roșia Poieni copper mine is a large open pit copper mine in the centre of Romania's Transylvania region, 90 km (56 mi) northwest of Alba Iulia and 484 km (301 mi) north of the capital Bucharest. Geographically the mine is located in the Apuseni Mountains, 7 km (4.3 mi) south of the Arieș River in Lupșa commune.

The Roșia Poieni deposit was developed between the 1950s and 1970s within the Abrud–Mușca–Bucium area (the Golden Quadrilateral) from the Metaliferi ('Ore') Mountains, part of the Apuseni Mountains. As of 2009, the mine produced around 11,000 tonnes of copper a year and the mineral deposit represented 65% of the total copper reserves in Romania. The mine is owned by CupruMin, a state-owned company.

== Location and access ==
Access to the site is made through a south-west industrial haul road from Cornii Valley that crosses the National Road no. 74 Alba-Iulia – Zlatna – Abrud when entering Abrud and through a north industrial haul road from Mușca Valley that crosses the National Road DN75 Câmpeni – Turda in Mușca village, Lupșa commune.

== Geology ==
As of 2022, Roșia Poieni represented the largest copper and gold reserve in Romania, and as the second largest in Europe, having estimated reserves of 1.5 billion tonnes of ore grading 0.36% copper. It is enclosed by eruptive sub-volcanic Miocene rocks (micro-diorite or Fundoaia andesites).

The Fundoaia body has the shape of a vertical column of 1,180 m (3,870 ft) in height (+1,030 m (3,380 ft) → −150 m (−490 ft)) and in horizontal plane having the following dimensions: 660 m × 740 m (2,170 ft × 2,430 ft) / 820 m × 956 m (2,690 ft × 3,136 ft). The eruptive body comes in contact (through the tectonic breccia) with andesite necks (Poieni, Curmătura, Melciu, Piatra Tichileu, and Jgheabului Hills) and with sedimentary Cretaceous rocks. The porphyry copper deposit is made up mainly of fine disseminations, nests and veinlets (0.02÷3 cm) of pyrite, chalcopyrite, and magnetite; gold included in the chalcopyrite and pyrite, and secondary minerals: bornite, covellite, chalcocite, sphalerite, galena, molybdenite, germanite, malachite, azurite and is developed in microdioritic rocks.

== Ore processing ==
The ore extracted from the open pit is crushed in a gyratory crusher after being transported and stored in the crushed ore storage facility located within the processing plant site. As of 2009, the processing plant had a design capacity of 9 million tonnes extracted and processed per year, the process being made on 4 technological lines of 7,500 tonnes per day. The plant was launched between 1983 and 1987. The ore is subsequently processed through a classical processing flow, with a two-stage grinding phase in two autogenous mills and in two ball mills, followed by flotation, which is performed in pneumomechanical cells (17 m^{2} (180 sq ft)) where the primary concentrate is obtained, which subsequently is flotated in cells of 5.7 m^{2} (61 sq ft) where a copper concentrate is obtained with a content between 16.5 and 20% copper. The concentrate is thickened in sided thickeners and filtered through a pressure filter (Larox).

== Pollution ==
Roșia Poieni ore is sulphide ore, requiring several steps to extract the copper. Also, the ore contains only 0.38% copper, so the tailing (the residue sludge) amount is very large. This is pumped into a nearby valley, once the site of the now buried village of Geamăna.

As the ore is sulphuric, the sludge contains high amounts of sulphide minerals, such as chalcocite (Cu_{2}S), pyrrhotite (Fe_{1−x}S) and pyrite (FeS_{2}), the latter dissolving into sulphuric acid when in contact with air. The pH value of the sludge pond was about 2.1-4.9 as of 2017. However, the sludge from the mine also contains pH-buffering materials, notably lime used in the ore-cleansing process. Stopping the sludge would therefore also stop the pH regulating of the sludge, which in turn would lower the pH value even more, resulting in damage to the blocking dam constructed to the north of the valley to stop the highly toxic sludge from spilling into the rivers leading into the Danube and the Black Sea.

== Geamăna ==
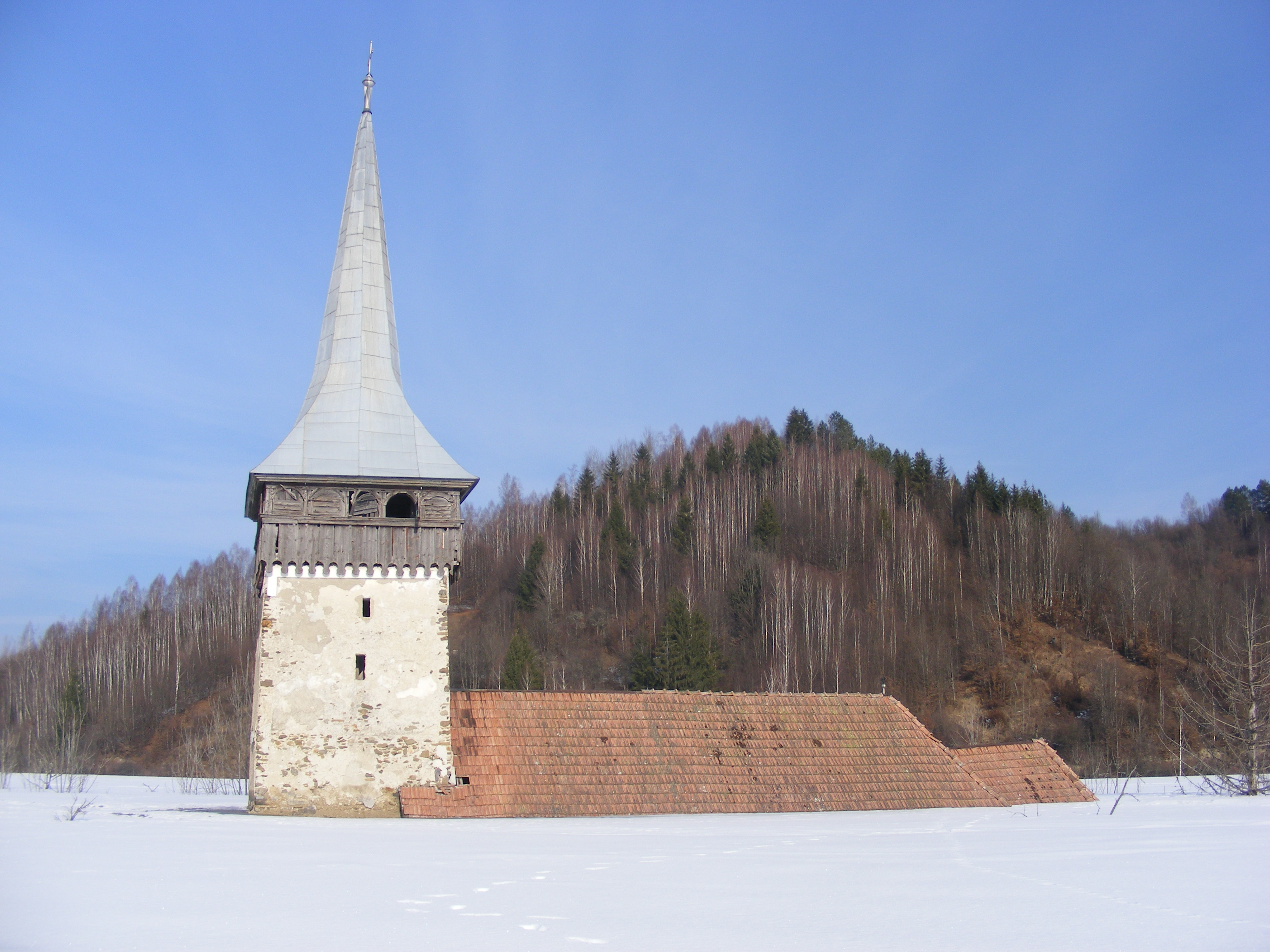
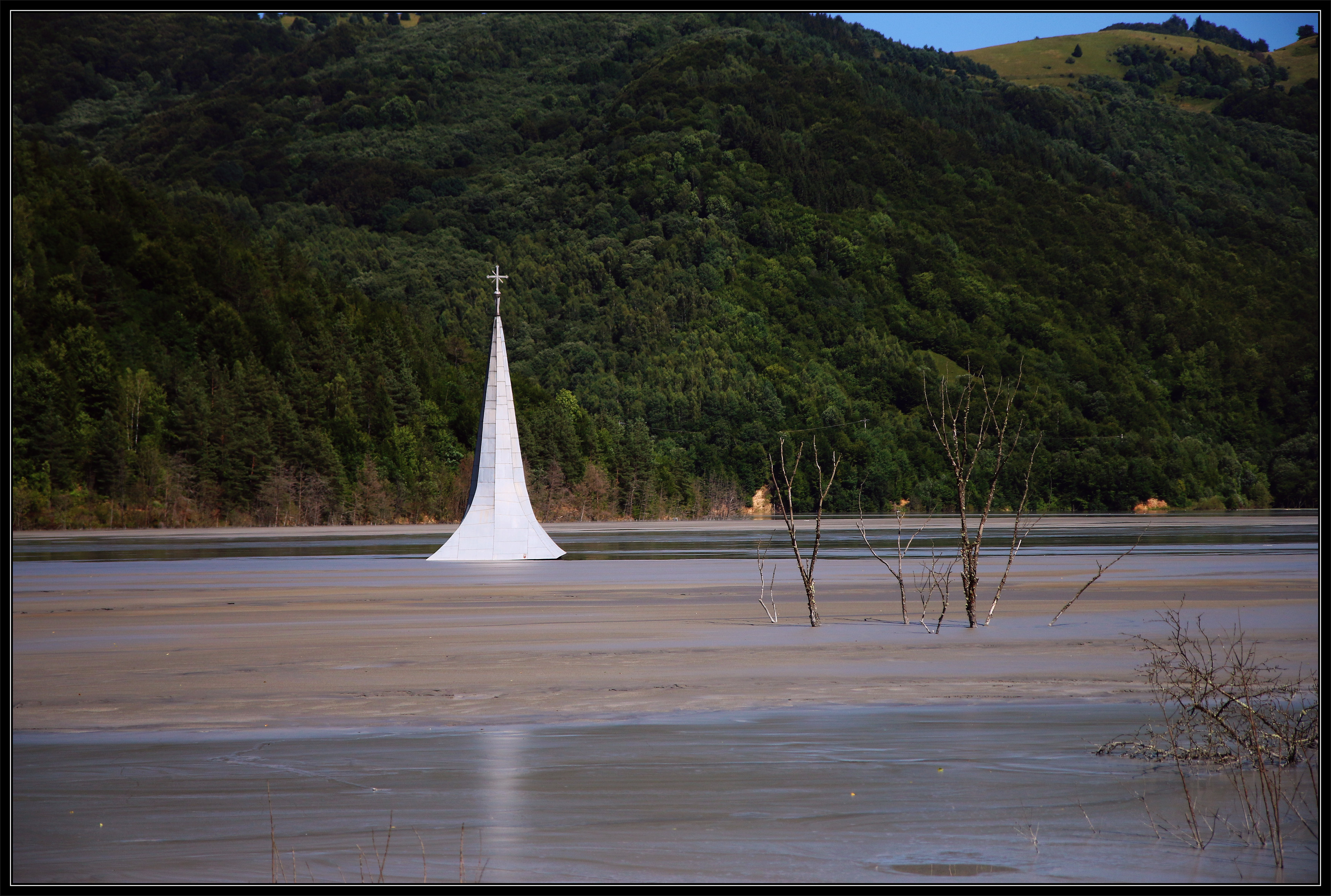
The tower of the village church, built in 1800, in 2013 and then again in 2020

The village of Geamăna was located in a nearby valley. The village population of over 1,000 residents were evicted in the 1970s as the valley was to be used as a settling basin for the ore processing tailings. The basin has continued to fill with tailings, and as of 2015 was 90 meters deep and covered approximately 130 hectares. The flooded village is located at 46°19′41″N 23°12′36″E. In 2019, Arte released the series ARTE Re: which included a film about the village and the expulsion of the last inhabitants. In 2025 an independent horror game was released exploring the story of Geamăna.
