= Răchitova (disambiguation) =

Răchitova may refer to:

- Răchitova, a commune in Hunedoara County, Romania
- Răchitova, a village in Oravița town, Caraș-Severin County, Romania
- Răchitova (river), a tributary of the Râul Galben in Romania

== See also ==
- Răchita (disambiguation)
- Răchiți
- Răchitiș (disambiguation)
- Răchițele (disambiguation)
- Răchitoasa (disambiguation)
