= Valea Luncanilor =

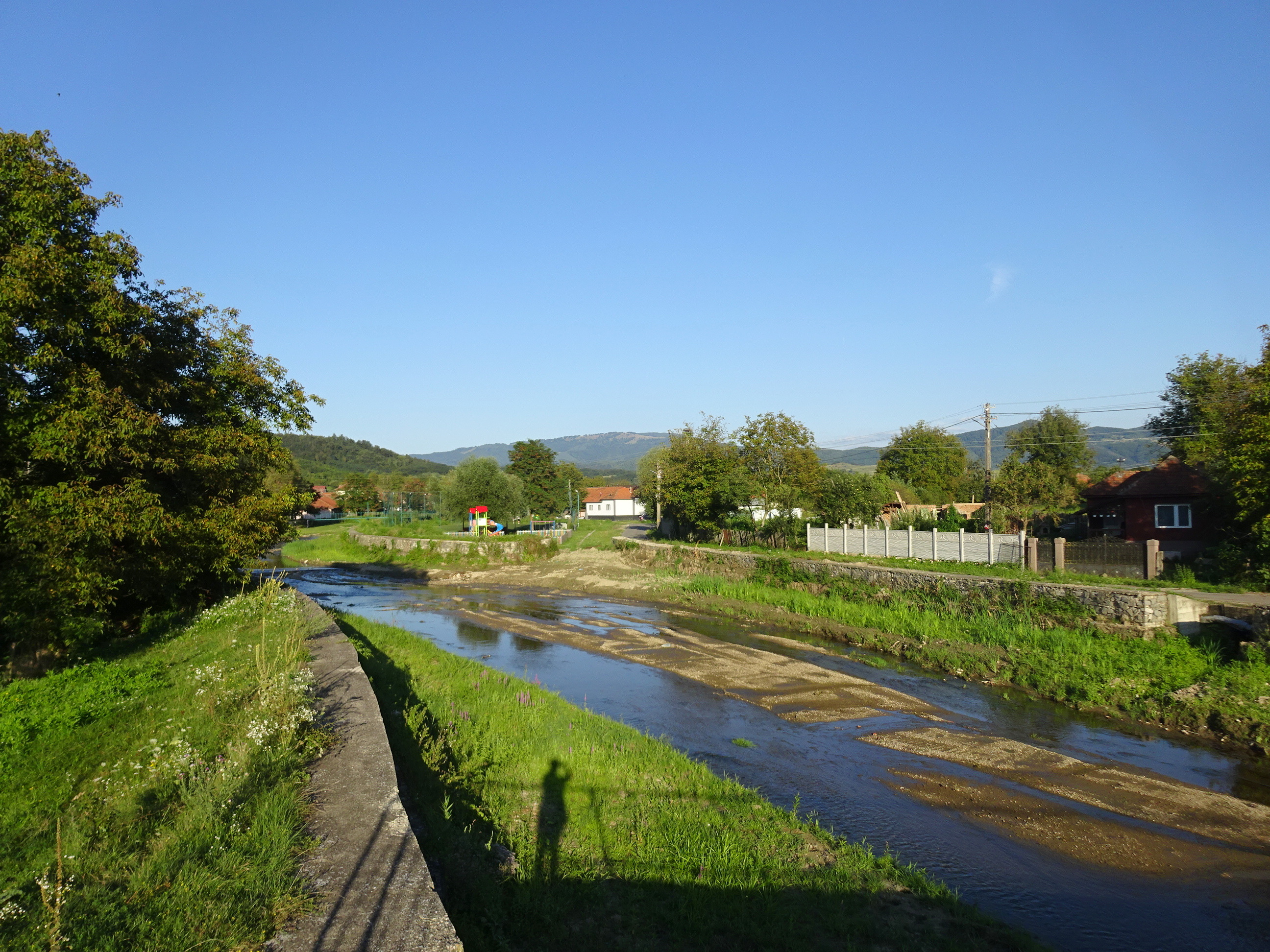

- Location within Romania

Location
- Country: Romania
- Counties: Hunedoara County
- Villages: Luncani, Boșorod, Chitid, Ohaba Streiului

Physical characteristics
- Source: Șureanu Mountains
- Mouth: Strei
  - location: Streisângeorgiu
  - coordinates: 45.7281°N 23.0154°E
- Length: 27 km (17 mi)
- Basin size: 148 km^{2} (57 sq mi)

Basin features
- Progression: Strei→ Mureș→ Tisza→ Danube→ Black Sea

The Valea Luncanilor (also: Luncani, in its upper course: Pârâul Vânătorului) is a right tributary of the river Strei in Romania. It discharges into the Strei in Streisângeorgiu. Its length is 27 km (17 mi) and its basin size is 148 km^{2} (57 sq mi).

== Tributaries ==
The following rivers are tributaries to the river Valea Luncanilor:

- Left: Oțapu, Valea Văcăriții, Purcăreț
- Right: Valea Morii, Valea Roșie, Alun, Scaiu, Bulac, Valea Bobaii, Ocoliș, Chitid, Grid
