= Răchitoasa (disambiguation) =

Răchitoasa is a commune in Bacău County, Romania.

Răchitoasa may also refer to:

- Răchitoasa River (Sacovăț), a tributary of the Sacovăț River in Romania
- Răchitoasa River (Zeletin), a tributary of the Zeletin River in Romania

== See also ==
- Răchita (disambiguation)
- Răchiți
- Răchitiș (disambiguation)
- Răchițele (disambiguation)
- Răchitova (disambiguation)
- Răchita River (disambiguation)
