= Răchițele =

Răchițele may refer to:

- Răchițele, a village in Mărgău commune in Cluj County, Romania
- Răchițele de Jos, a village in Cocu commune in Argeș County, Romania
- Răchițele de Sus, a village in Cocu commune in Argeș County, Romania
- Valea Răchițele, an alternative name for the upper course of the river Săcuieu in Cluj County, Romania

== See also ==
- Răchita (disambiguation)
- Răchiți
- Răchitiș (disambiguation)
- Răchitova (disambiguation)
- Răchitoasa (disambiguation)
