= Rachitis =

Rachitis may refer to:

- Rickets, a condition that results in weak bones in children
- Răchitiş (disambiguation), several uses
