= Văratec =

Văratec may refer to the following places in Romania:

- Văratec, a village in Agapia Commune, Neamț County
- Văratec Monastery, located in Văratec, Agapia
- Văratec, a village in Salcea Commune, Suceava County
- Văratec (river), a river in Hunedoara County

== See also ==
- Văratic (disambiguation)
