= Gorova River =

Gorova River may refer to the following rivers in Romania:

- Gorova, a tributary of the Bârzava in Caraș-Severin County
- Gorova, a tributary of the Râul Alb in Hunedoara County
- Gorova, a tributary of the Tur in Satu Mare County
