= Ohaba (Strei) =

- Location within Romania

Location
- Country: Romania
- Counties: Hunedoara County
- Villages: Ohaba-Ponor, Ponor

Physical characteristics
- Source: Șureanu Mountains
- Mouth: Strei
  - location: Ponor
  - coordinates: 45.5152°N 23.1215°E
- Length: 15 km (9.3 mi)
- Basin size: 44 km^{2} (17 sq mi)

Basin features
- Progression: Strei→ Mureș→ Tisza→ Danube→ Black Sea

The Ohaba is a right tributary of the river Strei in Romania. The river rises under mount Chicera Izvorului. It flows southwestwards and in the proximity of Mount Plopi it enters a sinkhole. The river emerges in cave Șura Mare, near the village of Ohaba-Ponor, being locally referred to as Lunca Ponorului. It joins the Strei near the village of Ponor. Its length is 15 km (9.3 mi) and its basin size is 44 km^{2} (17 sq mi).
