= Valea Groșilor River =

Valea Groșilor River may refer to:

- Valea Groșilor, a tributary of the Molivișu in Alba County
- Valea Groșilor, a tributary of the Sadu in Sibiu County
