= Sasu =

River in Romania

- Location within Romania

Location
- Country: Romania
- Counties: Hunedoara County

Physical characteristics
- Source: Șureanu Mountains
- Mouth: Strei
  - coordinates: 45.5633°N 23.3427°E
- Length: 10 km (6.2 mi)
- Basin size: 17 km^{2} (6.6 sq mi)

Basin features
- Progression: Strei→ Mureș→ Tisza→ Danube→ Black Sea

The Sasu is a river in the Șureanu Mountains, north of Petroșani, Romania. It is a left tributary of the Strei. Its length is 10 km (6.2 mi) and its basin size is 17 km^{2} (6.6 sq mi).
