= Mălăiești River =

Mălăiești River may refer to:

- Mălăiești River (Elan)
- Mălăiești River (Sălaș)

== See also ==
- Mălăiești (disambiguation)
