= Itu (surname) =

Itu is a Romanian surname. Notable people with the surname include:

- Cornel Itu (born 1955), Romanian politician
- Ion Itu (1935–2006), Romanian literary critic and essayist
- Lucian Itu (born 1978), Romanian footballer and manager
