= Ion Itu =

Romanian politician and literary critic (1935–2006)

Ion Itu (born Ioan Itul; November 8, 1935–April 5, 2006) was a Romanian literary critic and essayist.

Born in Sălașu de Sus, Hunedoara County, his parents were Ioan, a health inspector, and his wife Susana (née Itul). He attended primary school in his native village from 1942 to 1946, followed by gymnasium in nearby Pui (1946–1949) and high school in Petroșani (1949–1953). He later enrolled in the philology and history faculty of the University of Cluj, attending from 1959 to 1963.

He worked as a substitute teacher in Lunca Cernii (1954–1956) and in Pui (1958–1960). In the interim, he performed his military service by laboring at Jilava (1956–1957) and at the Hunedoara constructions unit (1957–1959). Itu then held the following positions: head of the cultural center in Rășinari (1960–1964), methodologist at the Sibiu cultural center (1964–1966) and editor at the cable radio center in the same city (1966–1968), editor of Tribuna Sibiului (1968–1971) and at Brașov's Astra magazine (1971–1990; 1997–2001). During the Romanian Revolution, he became head of the Brașov County Council's committee on culture, serving until May 1990. At that point, he was elected to the Chamber of Deputies. He represented the ruling National Salvation Front, was secretary of the culture committee and served until the 1992 election. In 1991, he became founding director of Editura Orientul Latin publishing house.

Publications that ran Itu's work include Astra, Transilvania, Steaua, Tribuna, Contemporanul, România Literară and Săptămâna. He contributed to a number of collaborative works, including Omagiu 100. Brâncuși (1976), Nicolae Titulescu. 1941-1991 (1991), Dicționar de critică literară (1995), Eminescu. Mă topesc în flăcări (1999), Dicționar de poezie românească (1999) and Brâncuși – artist filosof (2001). His first published work appeared in Tribuna in 1963. His first book was a monograph about soprano Lucia Cosma, the 1976 Destinul unei artiste. This was followed by Pictori sibieni (1987), Critică și strategie (1988), Poemele sacre (1994), Primii noștri poeți (1995), Orfismul eminescian (1995), Drumul Parnasului (1998), Principii de estetică și filosofia culturii (2001), Cronici de tranziție (2002), Rădăcinile doctrinei literare în Ardeal (2002) and Sfântul de la Târgu Jiu (2003). In 2002, he was awarded the prize of the Brașov chapter of the Romanian Writers' Union.

He married Iustina Bulbucan, a teacher; the couple's son is historian of religion Mircea Itu.
