= Decebalus treasure =

Mythical Dacian treasure

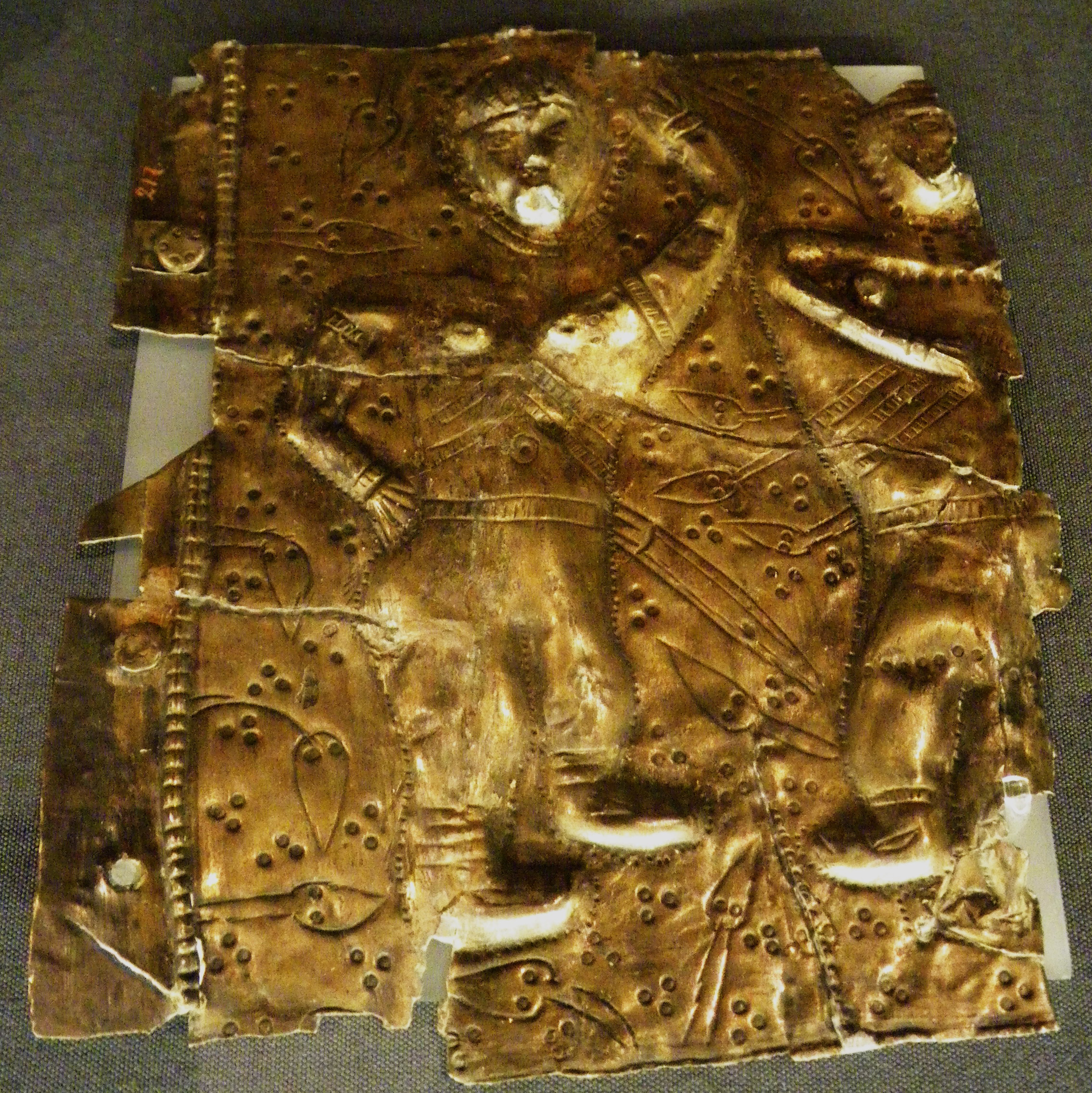
Dacian gold in the Kunsthistorisches Museum, Vienna, Austria

The Decebalus treasure was a 2nd-century hoard of precious metal objects, supposedly concealed by Decebalus beneath a watercourse (the modern Strei) in the ancient kingdom of Dacia. It features in the historical work of Cassius Dio, who claims that the Roman Empire seized the treasure after a captive Dacian nobleman revealed its hiding place.

== Story ==
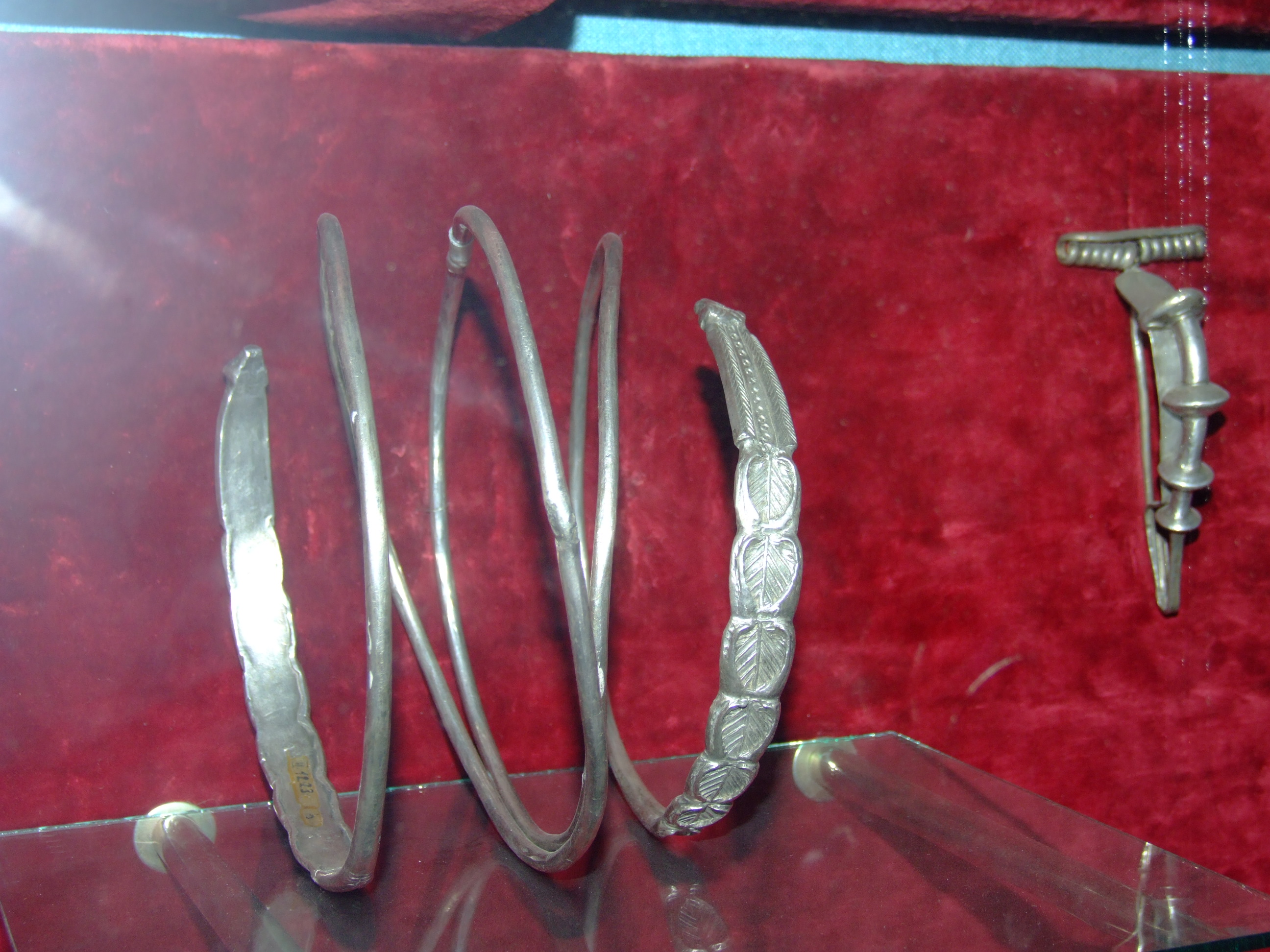
Dacian bracelet in Cluj museum, Romania

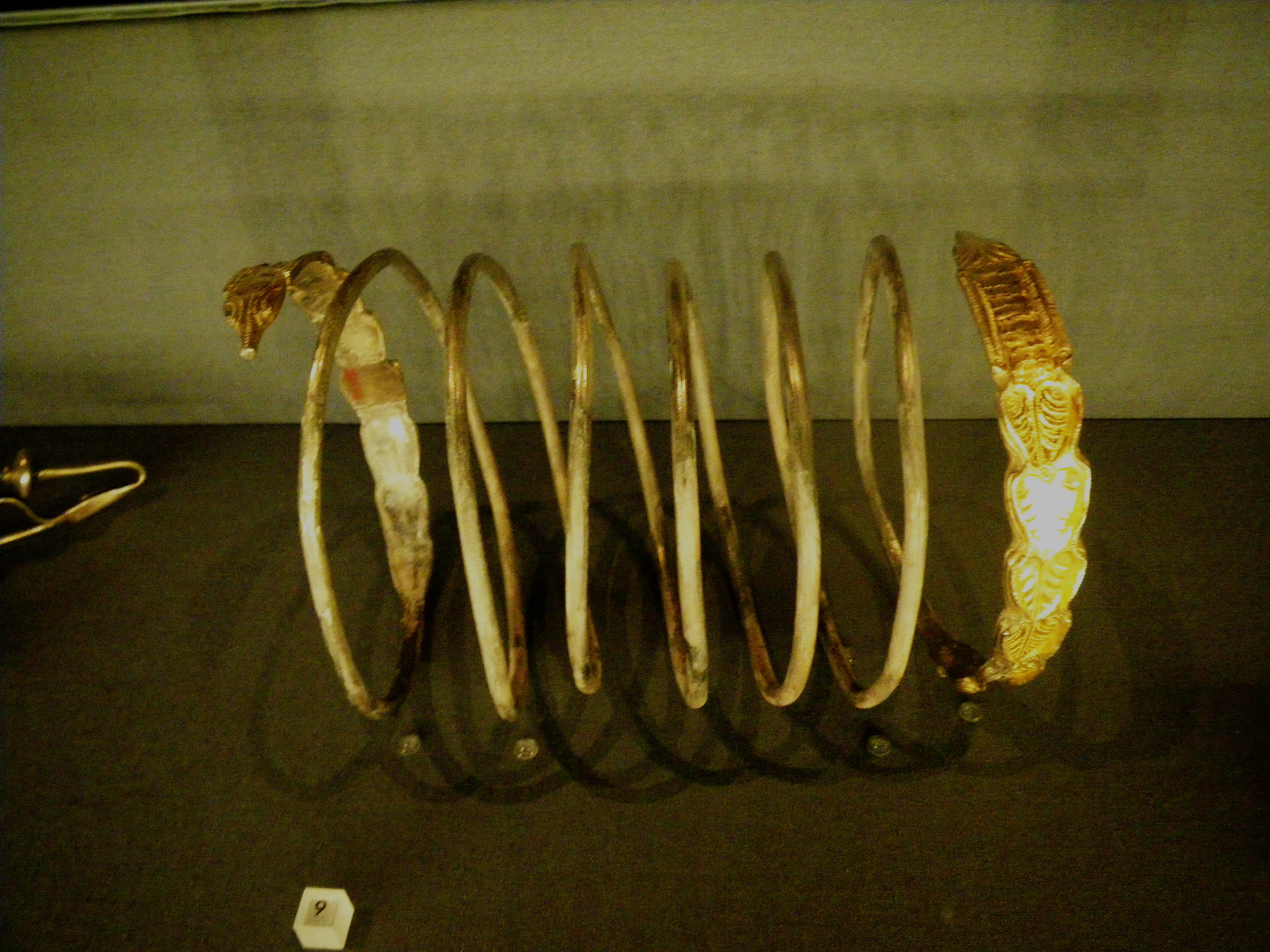
Dacian bracelet in Vienna, Austria

During the Second Dacian War (105–106), many Dacian nobles surrendered or were caught. One of them, Bicilis, disclosed the location of a treasure, supposedly buried at the bottom of a river.

"The treasures of Decebalus were also discovered, though hidden beneath the river Sargetia, which ran past his palace. With the help of some captives Decebalus had diverted the course of the river, made an excavation in its bed, and into the cavity had thrown a large amount of silver and gold and other objects of great value that could stand a certain amount of moisture; then he had heaped stones over them and piled on earth, afterwards bringing the river back into his course. He also had caused the same captives to deposit his robes and other articles of a like nature in caves, and after accomplishing this had made away with them to prevent them from disclosing anything. But Bicilis, a companion of his who knew what had been done, was seized and gave information about these things."

According to the story, the Dacian king Decebalus (reigned 87–106) used Roman prisoners to deviate the course of the Sargetia river and buried a treasure at the bottom. He buried "so much silver and gold and some other artefacts who can survive moisture", after which the river was returned to its original course. The rest of the treasure was deposited in surrounding caves, and the Roman prisoners were slaughtered.

== Sources ==
T. Statilius Crito of Heraclea, Trajan's procurator and medic, compiling a Getica, wrote that the Decebalus treasure included 5,000,000 lbs (2,200 tonnes) of gold and 10,000,000 lbs (4,500 tonnes) of silver. Some modern historians, such as Julian Bennett, believe that this is a copy error.

Jérôme Carcopino has estimated the treasure at 165,500 kg of gold and 331,000 kg of silver. Between 1540 and 1759, in Sarmizegetusa Regia, 700 kg of gold was discovered, and much more was found in the 19th century.

The Roman claim that they looted in a single hoard 165 tons of gold and 300 tons of silver is accepted by some historians. This amount is perhaps credible in terms of the massive Dacian exploitation of precious metals in the Apuseni Mountains, along with trade payments and tributes from abroad (including from the Roman empire) paid to Dacia. Also, its existence in one spot suggests that the Dacian state had central control of precious metal circulation.

== See also ==
- Trajan's Dacian Wars

== Bibliography ==
- Taylor, Timothy (1994). "Thracians, Scythians, and Dacians". The Oxford illustrated prehistory of Europe. Oxford University Press. ISBN 978-0-19-814385-7.
