= Mircea Păcurariu =

Romanian historian and theologian (1932–2021)

Mircea Păcurariu (30 July 1932 – 13 January 2021) was a Romanian theologian, historian and priest in the Romanian Orthodox Church.

== Biography ==
Born in Ruși, Hunedoara County, he was the son of the village priest. He enrolled in the History faculty of Babeș University in Cluj, but had to leave after his first year because the Communist Romanian authorities viewed his social origin as unacceptable. He later attended the theological seminaries in Sibiu and in Bucharest, then taught at the seminaries of Neamț Monastery and Sibiu. In 1997, he was elected a corresponding member of the Romanian Academy; he was elevated to titular status in 2015.
