= Văratec (river) =

- Location within Romania

Location
- Country: Romania
- Counties: Hunedoara County

Physical characteristics
- Mouth: Strei
  - coordinates: 45.5257°N 23.0597°E
- Length: 7 km (4.3 mi)
- Basin size: 26 km^{2} (10 sq mi)

Basin features
- Progression: Strei→ Mureș→ Tisza→ Danube→ Black Sea
- Tributaries
  - left: Dreptul

The Văratec is a right tributary of the river Strei in Romania. It flows into the Strei in the village Galați. Its length is 7 km (4.3 mi) and its basin size is 26 km^{2} (10 sq mi).
