= Muncel =

- Location within Romania

Location
- Country: Romania
- Counties: Hunedoara County

Physical characteristics
- Mouth: Crivadia
  - location: Baru
  - coordinates: 45.4701°N 23.1702°E
- Length: 9 km (5.6 mi)
- Basin size: 23 km^{2} (8.9 sq mi)

Basin features
- Progression: Crivadia→ Strei→ Mureș→ Tisza→ Danube→ Black Sea
- Tributaries
  - left: Smida

The Muncel is a left tributary of the river Crivadia in Romania. It flows into the Crivadia in Baru, close to its confluence with the Strei. Its length is 9 km (5.6 mi) and its basin size is 23 km^{2} (8.9 sq mi).
