= Liviu Comes =

Romanian composer and musicologist

Liviu Comes (December 13, 1918, Şerel, Hunedoara County, Romania — September 28, 2004) was a Romanian composer and musicologist.

He studied music at the Municipal Music Conservatory in Târgu Mureş (1927–1937), later at the Cluj Music Conservatory (1946–1950). He also studied medicine at the Cluj-Sibiu University (1937–1943).

Between 1950 and 1969 he was a professor of harmony, counterpoint and musical forms at the Music Conservatory in Cluj. Between 1965 and 1970 he was chancellor of the same Conservatory.

From 1969 to 1981 he was professor of counterpoint and fugue at the Bucharest Music Conservatory. There he was a department head from 1979 to 1981.

Between 1977 and 1990 he was secretary of the didactic and children's section at the Composers' Union of Romania.

He was awarded several prizes, including the "Romanian Academy's Prize" (1974) and "The Romanian Composers' Union Prize" (1972, 1976, 1981, 1985, 1987, 1991, 1998).

There is a composition contest named in his honor.

In 1994, he was made an honorary citizen of Cluj-Napoca.

== Books ==
Melodica palestriniană,

- Co-author of "Musical Dictionary", 1979, Bucharest, Ed. Ştiinţifică şi Enciclopedică
- Co-author of "The History of World Music by Date", 1983, Bucharest, Ed. Muzicală.
- Co-author of "Dicţionar de termeni muzicali", 1984
- "Contrapunct", 1977
- "Studii de contrapunct", 3 volumes (Vol I, 1976; Vol II, 1976; Vol III, 1979)
- Rumänische Klavierminiaturen für Kinder und Jugendliche
- Co-author of "A Treatise on Vocal and Instrumental Counterpoint", 1987, Bucharest, Muzica, 1/1987
- "Lumea polifoniei", 1984
