= Văratic =

Văratic may refer to several places in Moldova:

- Văratic, Ialoveni, a commune in Ialoveni district
- Văratic, Rîşcani, a commune in Rîşcani district

== See also ==
- Văratec (disambiguation)
