= Cugir =

- Town
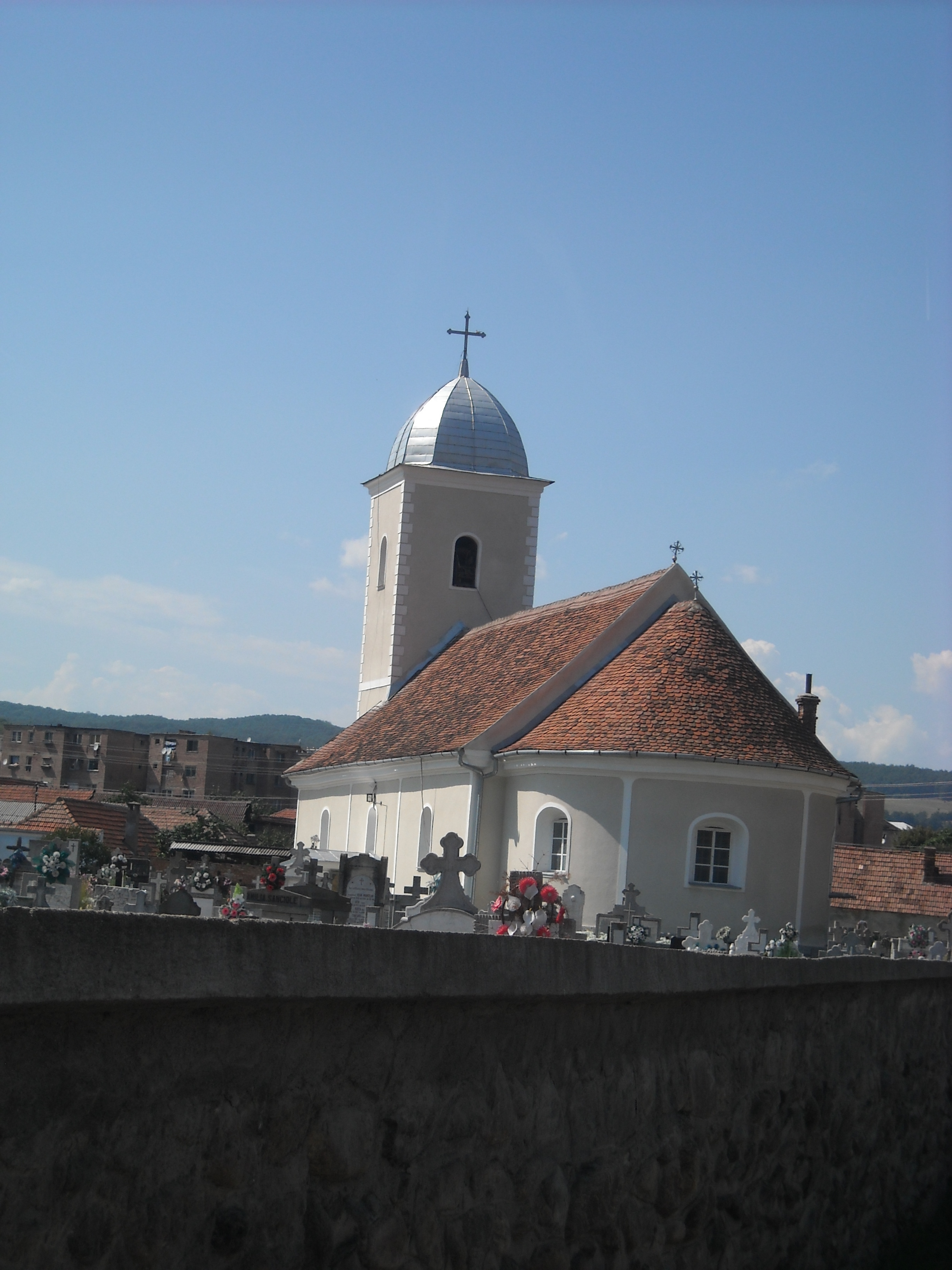

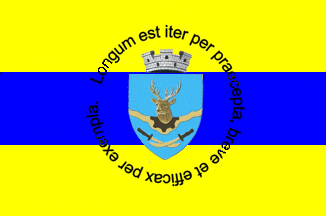
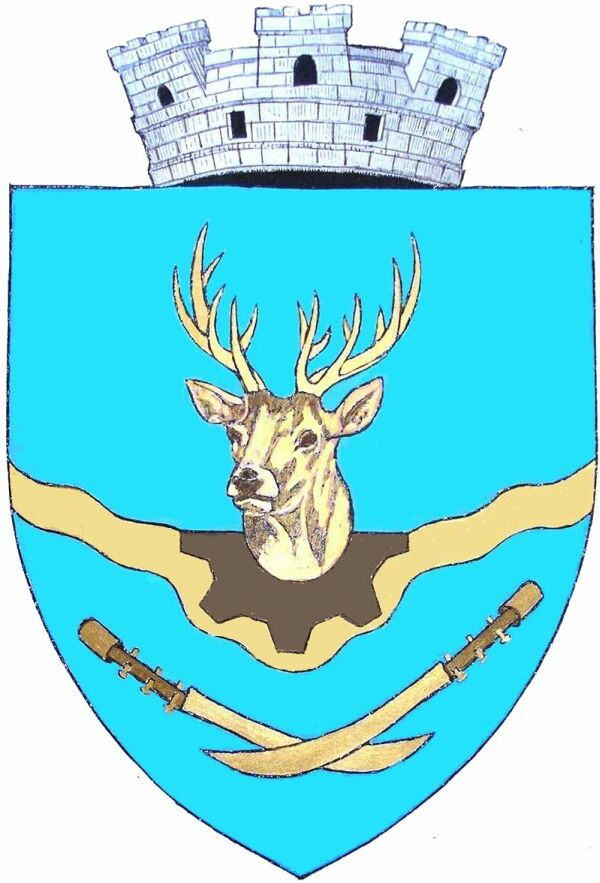
- Flag Coat of arms

- Location in Alba County

- Location in Romania
- Coordinates: 45°50′37″N 23°21′49″E
- Country: Romania
- County: Alba

Government
  - Mayor (2024–2028): Adrian Ovidiu Teban (PNL)
- Area: 354.1 km^{2} (136.7 sq mi)
- Elevation: 300 m (980 ft)
- Highest elevation: 700 m (2,300 ft)
- Population (2021-12-01): 19,473
  - Density: 54.99/km^{2} (142.4/sq mi)
- Time zone: UTC+02:00 (EET)
  - Summer (DST): UTC+03:00 (EEST)
- Postal code: 515600
- Area code: +40) 02 58
- Vehicle reg.: AB
- Website: www.primariacugir.ro

Cugir (Romanian pronunciation: [kuˈd͡ʒir]; German: Kudsir, Kudschir, Hungarian: Kudzsir) is a town in Alba County, Romania. Declared a town in 1968, it administers seven villages: Bocșitura (Hungarian Boksiturahavas, German Potschitur), Bucuru (Bukuruhavas/Bukur), Călene (Kalenihavas/Kalleney), Fețeni (Fecehavas/Fetzeberg), Goașele (Goaselehavas/Eisenhammer), Mugești (Mugestihavas/Kudschirstallen), and Vinerea (Felkenyér/Oberbrodsdorf).

== Geography ==
The central settlement of the Breadfield region, the town lies on the banks of the Cugir River, at the confluence of headwaters Râul Mare and Râul Mic. It is situated 300 metres (980 feet) above sea level, at the base of the Șureanu Mountains.

Cugir is located in the southwestern part of Alba County, about 31 kilometres (19 miles) from Sebeș and 37 km (23 mi) from Alba Iulia, the capital of the county. It lies on the border with Hunedoara County, 17 km (11 mi) from Orăștie and 41 km (25 mi) from Deva.

== Name ==
Throughout the history the name of the town is mentioned in many documents under different names in different languages, therefore the old settlement "villa Kunentum" becomes in 1493 villa Kudzyr, in 1566 Kwczyr, in 1599 – Kuchir, in 1656 – Kuchjir, in 1673 – Kucsir, in 1733 – Kuser, in 1750 – Kudsier, 1760–1762 – Kudzser, in 1805 Kudsir and in 1850 – Kusir.

== History ==
=== Ancient times ===
Numerous archeological discoveries prove that life in the region flourished as early as the Bronze Age, around the 10th century BC, Cugir being part of the territory known as "The Iron Gates of Transylvania", a region famous for its natural iron resources. In 88–44 BC, king Burebista, the most powerful of the kings of Thrace, according to the historian Acronion, established the new capital in the area, at Sarmizegetusa Regia (located in the Șureanu Mountains, west of Cugir). In this period the settlement of Cugir (villa Kunentum) was an important center for metal extracting and processing, with renowned workshops producing tools, weapons, and coins.

=== Modern period ===
Cugir has a complex political history with periods under the Principality of Transylvania, the Habsburg monarchy, the Kingdom of Hungary, and the Kingdom of Romania.

In the mid-18th century the Habsburg Empire authorities established the "Frontier Police" in Transylvania. They also tried to recruit Romanians from southern Transylvania between Baraolt and Orăștie, but the locals put up a fierce resistance against the enrollment. The population revolted due to a policy of forced removal and deportation used to convince the peoples to join in, and a bloody massacre took place in the place known today as the old market of the town. Severe clashes occurred again in the area when the authorities decided to "brake" the neighboring villages Șibot and Vinerea to establish the 4th company. Finally, after severe conflicts and pressure, in 1764, 6 regiments were established and in 1768 another battalion was formed so that the frontier police in Transylvania was of approximatively 17,000 soldiers.

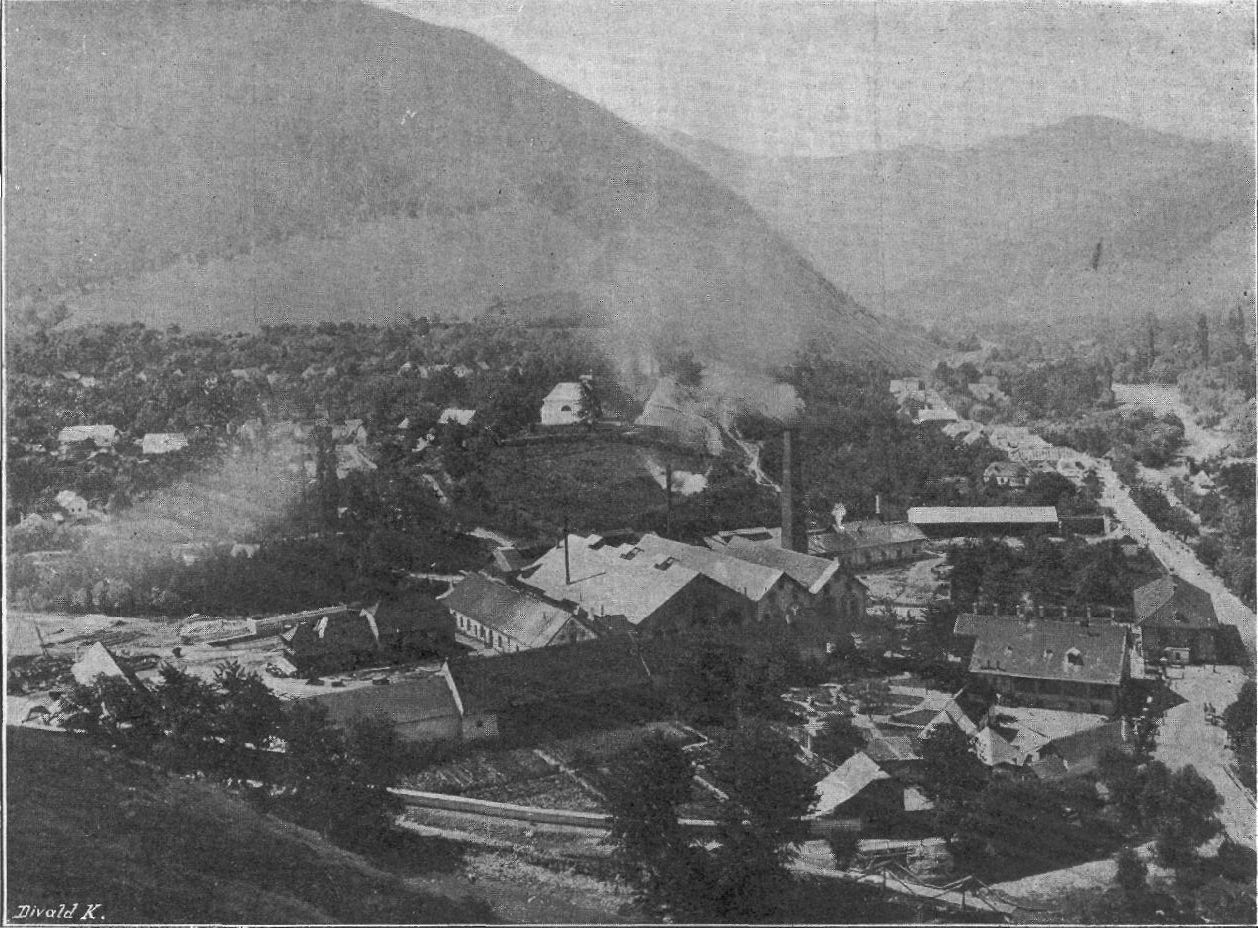
Iron works of Cugir, 1896

After the loss of Silesia, the authorities and the Austrian business began investing funds into the mining and manufacturing industry in Transylvania. In 1764 Empress Maria Theresa of Austria gave long-term loans without interest to concessionaires that pledged to exploit the mines and the state and concessionaire manufactories used free workers brought from Styria, Carinthia, Tyrol, Upper Hungary or Dalmatia, but the local peasants represented the main work force. Due to industrialisation, a great number of Romanian villages and their grounds, pastures, agricultural land and forest were seized. At the end of the 18th century factories for metal processing were founded in Cugir and Sibișel, just 15 years after the suppression of the Revolt of Horea, Cloșca and Crișan to exploit the mineral resources and also to bolster obedience towards the Empire. According to documents, the "Iron and Steel factory" was established in Cugir in the year 1799, one of the first factories in Transylvania and since then the history of the town has revolved around it.

After the Austro-Hungarian Compromise of 1867, it became part of the Kingdom of Hungary within Austria-Hungary up until the end of World War I. From that time, it has been part of Romania, which was acknowledged internationally by the Treaty of Trianon in 1920.

Thereafter the factory became owned by the Romanian state and during World War II its production was seized by Nazi Germany for war purposes. Since 1946 the Cugir Arms Factory oriented its production towards military components and house appliances, especially washing machines. It became the top Romanian producer of sewing machines for industrial and private purposes.

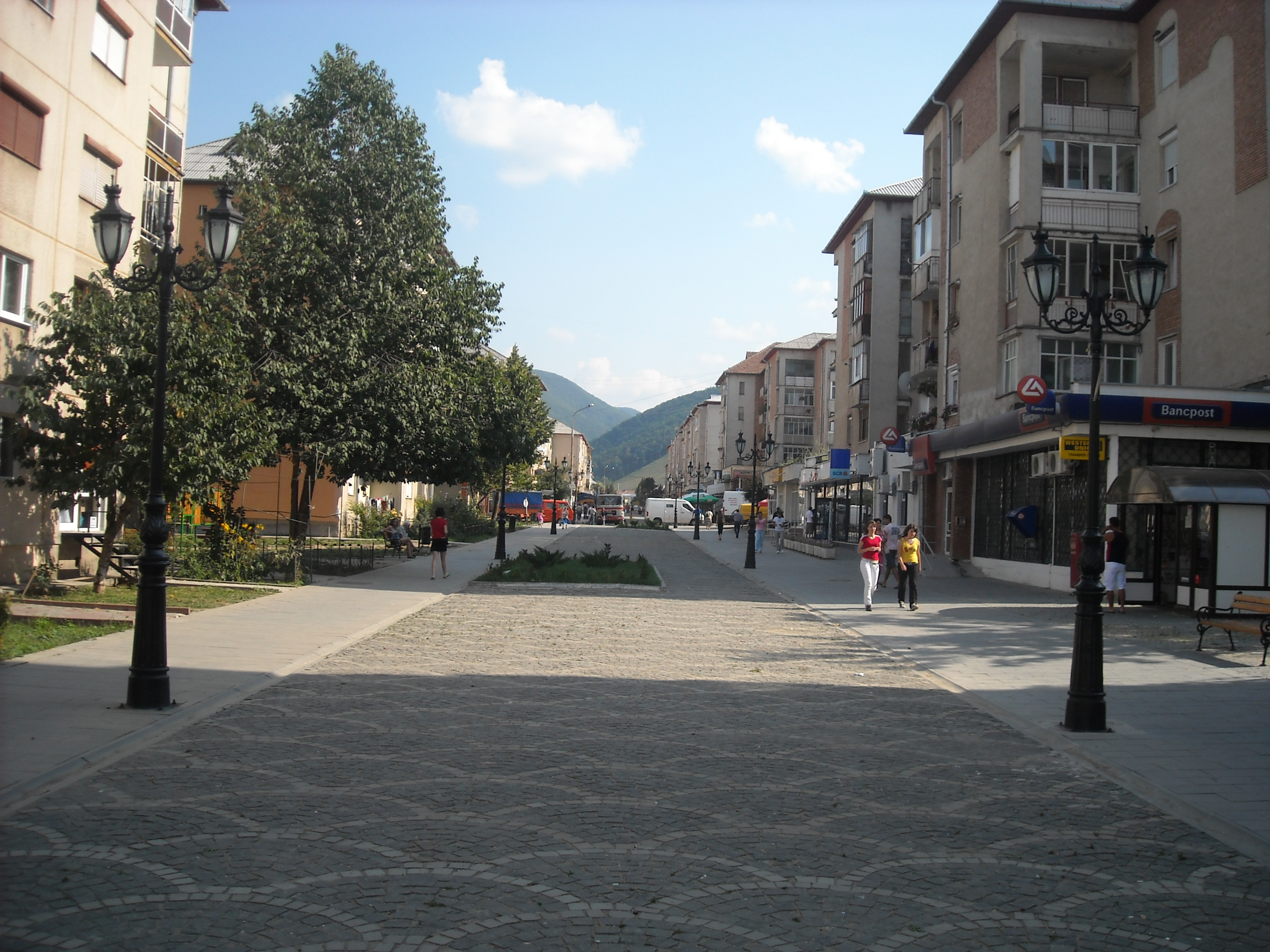
Town centre

During the Romanian Revolution, Cugir was the first locality in Alba County and the fourth in the country where protests against the communist regime of Nicolae Ceaușescu occurred, on December 21, 1989.

== Demographics ==
Historical population
| Year | Pop. | ±% |
|---|---|---|
| 1966 | 15,575 | — |
| 1977 | 26,773 | +71.9% |
| 1992 | 31,877 | +19.1% |
| 2002 | 30,244 | −5.1% |
| 2011 | 21,376 | −29.3% |
| 2021 | 19,473 | −8.9% |
Source: Census data

At the 2021 census, Cugir had a population of 19,473. According to the census from 2011, the town had a total population of 21,376; of those, 95.4% were Romanians, 3.4% Roma, 0.9% Hungarians, and 0.2% Germans.

== Climate ==
Cugir has a humid continental climate (Cfb in the Köppen climate classification).

Climate data for Cugir
| Month | Jan | Feb | Mar | Apr | May | Jun | Jul | Aug | Sep | Oct | Nov | Dec | Year |
|---|---|---|---|---|---|---|---|---|---|---|---|---|---|
| Mean daily maximum °C (°F) | 1.3 (34.3) | 3.2 (37.8) | 7.6 (45.7) | 13.6 (56.5) | 18 (64) | 21.2 (70.2) | 23.1 (73.6) | 23.5 (74.3) | 18.5 (65.3) | 13.7 (56.7) | 8.6 (47.5) | 2.8 (37.0) | 12.9 (55.2) |
| Daily mean °C (°F) | −2.5 (27.5) | −0.8 (30.6) | 3 (37) | 8.6 (47.5) | 13.3 (55.9) | 16.8 (62.2) | 18.6 (65.5) | 18.8 (65.8) | 14 (57) | 9.1 (48.4) | 4.5 (40.1) | −0.8 (30.6) | 8.6 (47.3) |
| Mean daily minimum °C (°F) | −5.8 (21.6) | −4.5 (23.9) | −1.4 (29.5) | 3.3 (37.9) | 8.1 (46.6) | 11.7 (53.1) | 13.6 (56.5) | 13.9 (57.0) | 9.7 (49.5) | 5.2 (41.4) | 1.2 (34.2) | −3.8 (25.2) | 4.3 (39.7) |
| Average precipitation mm (inches) | 60 (2.4) | 57 (2.2) | 72 (2.8) | 100 (3.9) | 115 (4.5) | 133 (5.2) | 119 (4.7) | 95 (3.7) | 93 (3.7) | 69 (2.7) | 61 (2.4) | 68 (2.7) | 1,042 (40.9) |
Source: https://en.climate-data.org/europe/romania/alba/cugir-44398/

== Economy ==
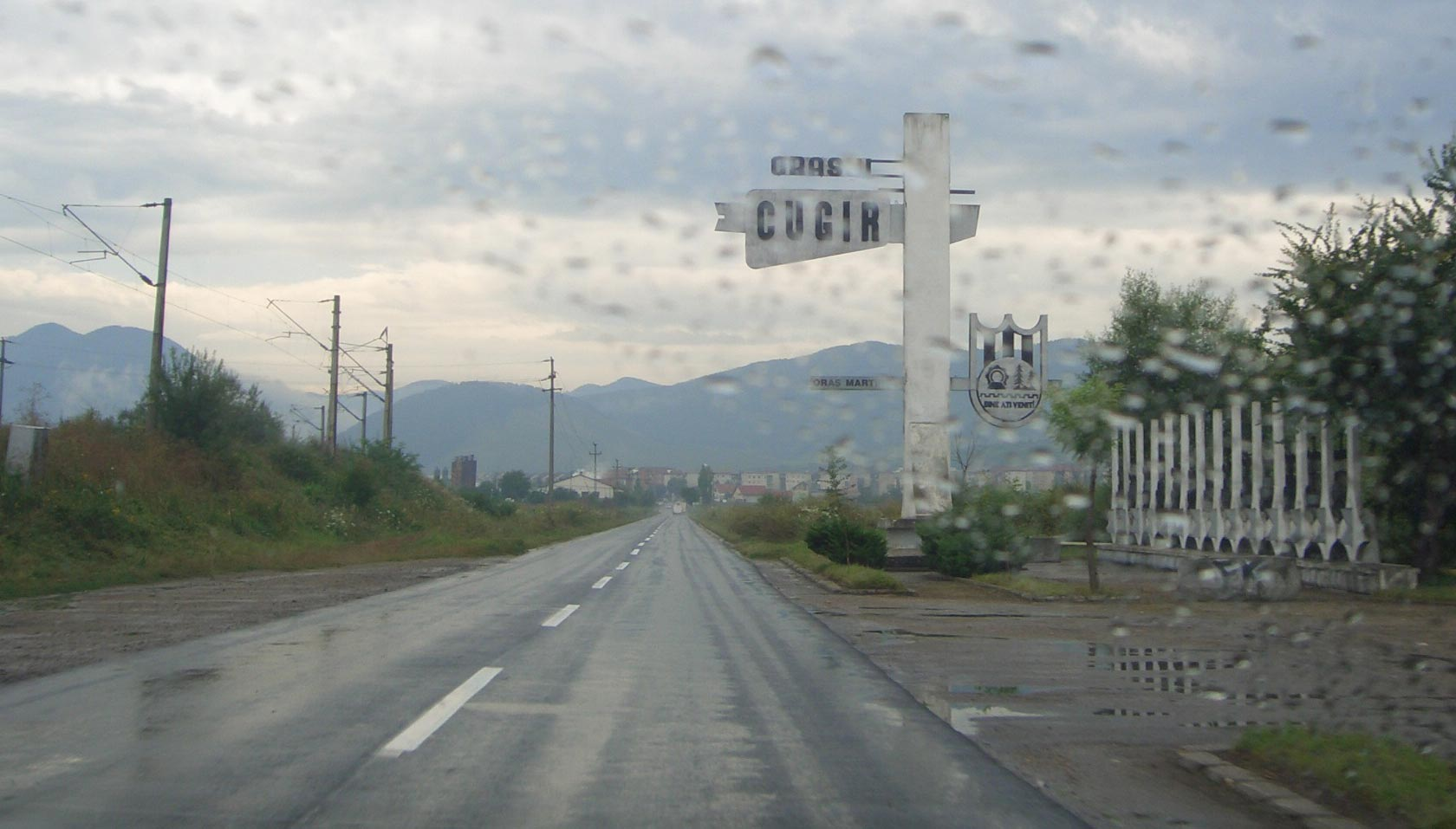
Entrance to Cugir

The town is a heavy industrialised one, with at least half of the total working age population engaged in industrial activities, and around 30 percent engaged in lumbering activities. The Cugir Arms Factory is the main employer in town and it has diversified its production to include along the traditional products automotive components and firearms, and a large part of its production is destined for export. Another employer is Star Transmission Cugir S.A., a Daimler company that produces gearbox parts.

== Education ==
The town has a high school (the David Prodan Theoretical High School), one technical school (the Ion D. Lăzărescu Technical College), 3 middle schools, and 6 kindergartens.

== Sport ==
The local football team, Metalurgistul Cugir, plays in the Liga III national division.

== Natives ==
- Teodor Atanasiu (born 1962), politician
- Bogdan Borza (born 1997), tennis player
- Ioan Mărginean (born 1960), footballer
- Ahmet Nurmambet (1893–1953), Army officer
- Valentin Uritescu (1941–2022), actor
