= Rușor (river) =

- Location within Romania

Location
- Country: Romania
- Counties: Hunedoara County
- Villages: Șerel, Rușor

Physical characteristics
- Mouth: Strei
  - location: Rușor
  - coordinates: 45.5334°N 23.0265°E
- Length: 12 km (7.5 mi)
- Basin size: 29 km^{2} (11 sq mi)

Basin features
- Progression: Strei→ Mureș→ Tisza→ Danube→ Black Sea
- Tributaries
  - left: Șerel

The Rușor is a left tributary of the Strei in Romania. It flows into the Strei in the village Rușor. Its length is 12 km (7.5 mi) and its basin size is 29 km^{2} (11 sq mi).
