= Ioan Neag =

Romanian footballer

Personal information
- Full name: Ioan Neag
- Date of birth: 18 February 1994 (age 32)
- Place of birth: Pianu, Romania
- Height: 1.84 m (6 ft 1/2 in)
- Position: Centre back

Team information
- Current team: Unirea Alba Iulia
- Number: 6

Youth career
- CSȘ Sebeș
- 2008–2010: Ardealul Cluj
- 2010–2012: Universitatea Cluj

Senior career*
Years	Team	Apps	(Gls)
2011–2012	Universitatea Cluj	1	(0)
2012–2013	Petrolul Ploiești	5	(1)
2013–2015	Universitatea Cluj	32	(0)
2016	Gaz Metan Mediaș	4	(0)
2016	Râmnicu Vâlcea	16	(0)
2017	Juventus București	4	(0)
2018	Șirineasa		
2018–2019	CSU Alba Iulia		
2019–	Unirea Alba Iulia		

International career^{‡}
2011–2012	Romania U-17	3	(0)
2014–2015	Romania U-21	4	(1)
- * Club domestic league appearances and goals as of 9 October 2019 ‡ National team caps and goals as of 16 June 2015

Ioan Neag (born 18 February 1994) is a Romanian footballer who plays as a centre back for Unirea Alba Iulia.

== Club career ==
Neag started playing football at CSȘ Sebeș. In 2008, he was spotted by Ardealul Cluj's trainer, Mihai Georgescu, at a competition that was organised by the Romanian Football Federation for 14-year-old players. Georgescu brought Neag to Ardealul and in 2010, together with other teammates, he joined Universitatea Cluj. He made his debut in Liga I on 15 May 2012, in a match against Voința Sibiu.

In 2012, Universitatea Cluj's owner, Florian Walter transferred most of the team's players at Petrolul Ploiești, including Ionuț Neag. The player spent one season at Petrolul Ploiești and returned to Universitatea Cluj in 2013.

== International career ==
Neag made his debut for Romania U-17 on 24 March 2011 in a game against Iceland U-17. He was part of the squad that played for the Romania under-17 national team that took part in the 2011 UEFA European Under-17 Football Championship, but didn't play a game.

== Honours ==
Petrolul Ploieşti

- Cupa României (1): 2012–13
