= Mălădia =

Mălădia may refer to:

- Mălădia [ro], a village in Măeriște Commune, Sălaj County, Romania
- Mălădia River, a tributary of Crasna River (Tisza) in Romania

== See also ==
- Mălăești (disambiguation)
- Mălăiești (disambiguation)
