= Paroș =

- Location within Romania

Location
- Country: Romania
- Counties: Hunedoara County
- Villages: Peștera, Paroș, Zăvoi

Physical characteristics
- Source: Retezat Mountains
- Mouth: Strei
  - location: Ohaba de sub Piatră
  - coordinates: 45.5456°N 22.9924°E
- Length: 17 km (11 mi)
- Basin size: 27 km^{2} (10 sq mi)

Basin features
- Progression: Strei→ Mureș→ Tisza→ Danube→ Black Sea
- Tributaries
  - right: Paroșul Mic

The Paroș is a left tributary of the river Strei in Romania. Its source is in the Retezat Mountains. It flows into the Strei in Ohaba de sub Piatră. Its length is 17 km (11 mi) and its basin size is 27 km^{2} (10 sq mi).
