= Crivadia =

- Location within Romania

Location
- Country: Romania
- Counties: Hunedoara County

Physical characteristics
- Source: Șureanu Mountains
- Mouth: Strei
  - coordinates: 45.4717°N 23.1694°E
- Length: 15 km (9.3 mi)
- Basin size: 69 km^{2} (27 sq mi)

Basin features
- Progression: Strei→ Mureș→ Tisza→ Danube→ Black Sea
- Tributaries
  - left: Răchita, Muncel
  - right: Frăsinelu, Râul Jghiabului, Balmoș

The Crivadia is a left tributary of the river Strei in Romania. It flows into the Strei in Baru. Its length is 15 km (9.3 mi) and its basin size is 69 km^{2} (27 sq mi).
