= Castra of Federi =

Fort in the Roman province of Dacia

- Location within Romania
- 45°32′N 23°7′E
- Location: Dealul Padeș / Sub Padeș, Federi, Hunedoara, Romania

History
- Founded: unknown
- Abandoned: unknown

Site notes
- Condition: Ruined

The castra of Federi was a fort in the Roman province of Dacia. The dates of its erection and of its abandonment by the Romans have not been determined. The ruins of the castra are located in Federi (commune Pui, Romania).

== See also ==
- List of castra
