= Silvaș =

- Location within Romania

Location
- Country: Romania
- Counties: Hunedoara County
- Villages: Silvașu de Sus, Silvașu de Jos

Physical characteristics
- Mouth: Strei
  - location: Plopi
  - coordinates: 45.6387°N 23.0116°E
- Length: 20 km (12 mi)
- Basin size: 36 km^{2} (14 sq mi)

Basin features
- Progression: Strei→ Mureș→ Tisza→ Danube→ Black Sea

The Silvaș (also known as Silvuț) is a left tributary of the river Strei in Romania. It flows into the Strei near Plopi. The river is 20 km (12 mi) long and has a basin area of 36 km^{2} (14 sq mi).
