= Mălăești =

Mălăeşti may refer to several villages in Romania:

- Mălăeşti, a village in Goiești Commune, Dolj County
- Mălăeşti, a village in Gropnița Commune, Iaşi County
- Mălăeşti, a village in Valea Largă Commune, Mureș County
- Mălăeştii de Jos and Mălăeştii de Sus, villages in Dumbrăvești Commune, Prahova County

== See also ==
- Mălădia (disambiguation)
- Mălăiești (disambiguation)
