= Muncel (disambiguation) =

Muncel may refer to several places in Romania:

== Populated places ==
- Muncel, a village in Câțcău Commune, Cluj County
- Muncel, a village in Cristolț Commune, Sălaj County

== Rivers ==
- Muncel, a tributary of the Bistricioara in Harghita County
- Muncel, a tributary of the Bistrița in Bistrița-Năsăud County
- Muncel, a tributary of the Crivadia in Hunedoara County
- Muncel, a tributary of the Someș in Cluj County

== See also ==
- Muncelu (disambiguation)
