= Răchitiș =

Răchitiș may refer to several places in Romania:

- Răchitiș, a village in Ghimeș-Făget Commune, Bacău County
- Răchitiș, a village in Bilbor Commune, Harghita County
- Răchitiș, a tributary of the Olt in Covasna County
- Răchitiș (Tazlău), a tributary of the Tazlău in Bacău County

== See also ==
- Răchita (disambiguation)
- Răchiți
- Răchițele (disambiguation)
- Răchitova (disambiguation)
- Răchitoasa (disambiguation)
- Rickets
