= Bărbat (river) =

- Location within Romania

Location
- Country: Romania
- Counties: Hunedoara County
- Villages: Hobița, Râu Bărbat

Physical characteristics
- Mouth: Strei
  - location: Pui
  - coordinates: 45.5229°N 23.0904°E
- Length: 30 km (19 mi)
- Basin size: 98 km^{2} (38 sq mi)

Basin features
- Progression: Strei→ Mureș→ Tisza→ Danube→ Black Sea

The Bărbat (Romanian: lit. 'Man') is a left tributary of the river Strei in Romania. It discharges into the Strei in Pui. Its length is 30 km (19 mi) and its basin size is 98 km^{2} (38 sq mi).

== Tributaries ==
The following rivers are tributaries to the river Bărbat:

- Left: Murgușa, Sohodol
- Right: Tulișa
