= CupruMin =

Copper and copper ore company in Romania

- Company type: State owned
- Industry: Copper
- Founded: 2000
- Headquarters: Abrud, Romania
- Key people: Nicolae Pavel, CEO
- Products: Copper
- Revenue: US$35 million (2010)
- Number of employees: 500 (2014)
- Website: www.cuprumin.ro

CupruMin is a company based in Abrud, Alba County, Romania specialised in the production of copper and copper ore. The company owns and operates the Roşia Poieni copper mine which represents the largest copper reserve in Romania and the second largest in Europe. CupruMin produces around 1.33 million tonnes of copper ore grading 0.36% copper per year from which 4,800 tonnes of copper metal is extracted. As of March 2010, Cuprumin had 420 employees and produced 400 tons of copper ore per month.

The company's attempt of May 28, 2008 to privatize was halted as the plan did not comply with State aid rules. The second try of privatization was conducted in November 2008 at a starting price of 27 million euro. In December 2008, the privatization attempt was canceled due to the unfavorable economic situation.

In November 2009, after more than one year of inactivity, work was restarted.

The Roşia Poieni copper mine deposit is estimated at 900,000 tons (60 percent of the copper Romania reserve), which allows to continue the exploitation for at least 20 years.

In March 2012, Roman Copper Corp. Canada won the tender for the full takeover of Copper Min capital, owned by the Ministry of Economy.
