= Pianu =

- Commune
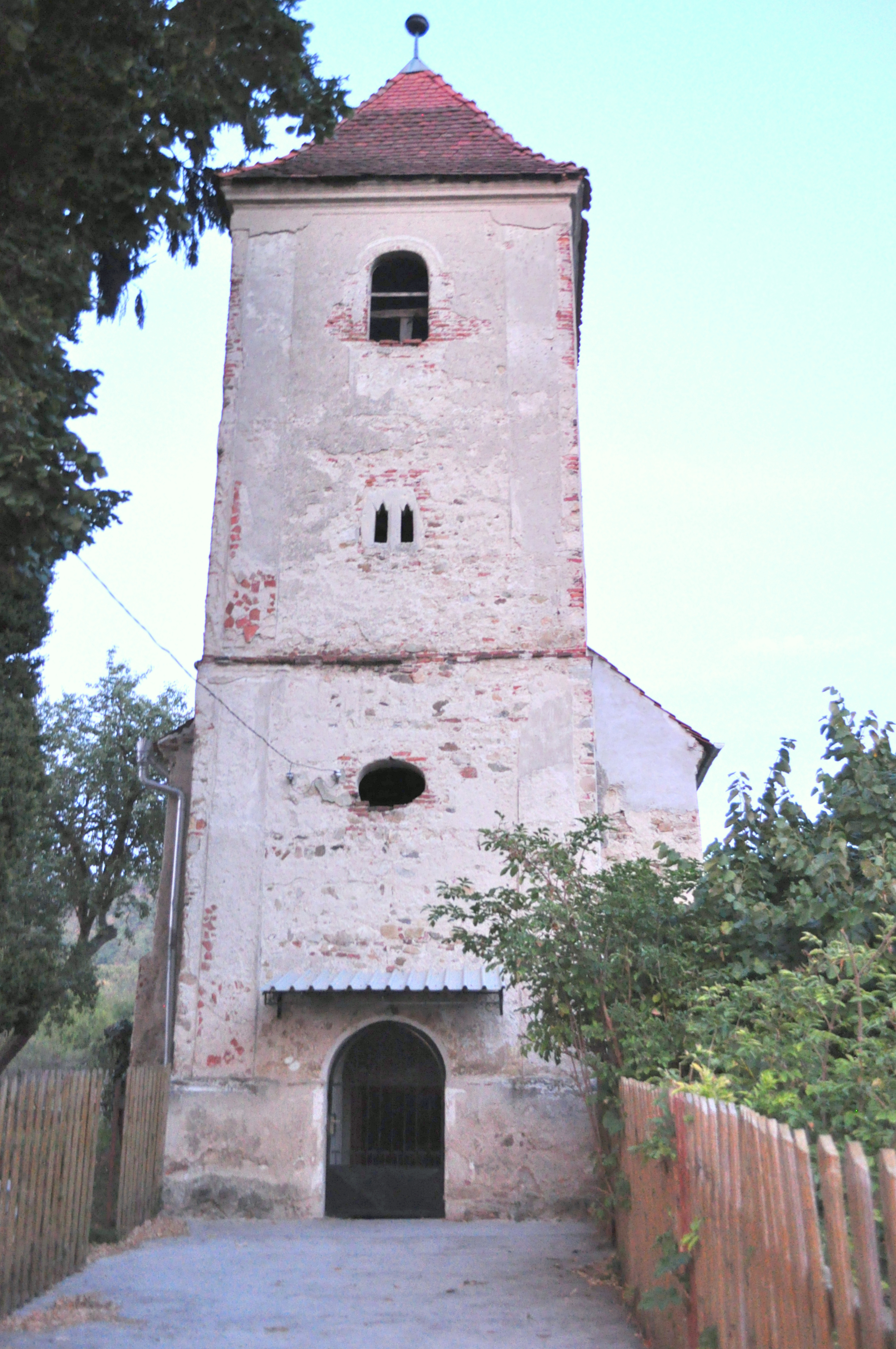
- Evangelical church in Pianu de Jos

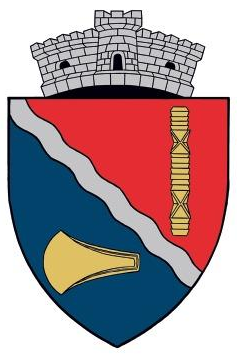
- Coat of arms

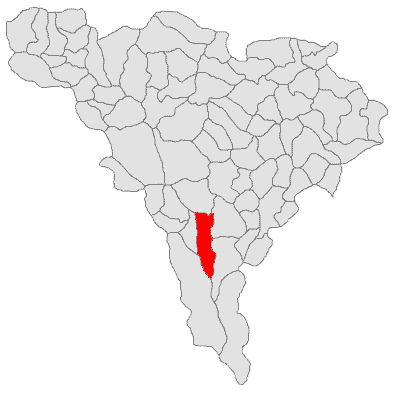
- Location in Alba County

- Location in Romania
- Coordinates: 45°56′N 23°29′E
- Country: Romania
- County: Alba

Government
  - Mayor (2020–2024): Marin-Ioan Petruse (PNL)
- Area: 115 km^{2} (44 sq mi)
- Elevation: 319 m (1,047 ft)
- Population (2021-12-01): 3,375
  - Density: 29.3/km^{2} (76.0/sq mi)
- Time zone: UTC+02:00 (EET)
  - Summer (DST): UTC+03:00 (EEST)
- Postal code: 517535
- Area code: (+40) 02 58
- Vehicle reg.: AB
- Website: www.primariapianu.ro

Pianu (German: Pien) is a commune located in Alba County, Transylvania, Romania. It has a population of 3,375 in 2021 and is composed of five villages: Pianu de Jos, Pianu de Sus (the commune center), Plaiuri, Purcăreți and Strungari.

The commune is situated in the southwestern part of Alba County, some 25 km (16 mi) south of the county seat, Alba Iulia. It is traversed from south to north (first through Pianu de Sus and then Pianu de Jos) by the Pianul river.

There are traces in Pianu of settlements dating back to the Roman period, when the 13th Twin Legion had encampments in the area. The commune was first attested in the 12th century; Pianu de Sus was attested in a deed registered in 1454 in Sibiu.

In Romanian	In German	In Hungarian
Pianu de Jos	Deutsch Pien	Alsópián
Pianu de Sus	Rumänisch Pien	Felsőpián
Plaiuri		Plaintelep
Purcăreți		Sebespurkerec
Strungari		Sztrugár

Historical population
Year	Pop.	±%
1850	3,634	—
1900	4,080	+12.3%
1941	4,269	+4.6%
1977	4,123	−3.4%
1992	3,552	−13.8%
2002	3,390	−4.6%
2011	3,082	−9.1%
2021	3,375	+9.5%
Source: INS, Census data

== Local customs ==
The cemeteries in these mountain villages still preserve the custom of using carved painted funerary posts on the graves of deceased men. The posts are decorated with geometric motifs, wolf teeth, and sometimes plant designs. Their height depends on the age of the deceased, with children and old men having smaller posts.

Other customs are wayside crosses, which are Christian symbols frequent inside the villages and nearby on roads and intersections. They are three interlinked crosses and signify the Holy Trinity.

== Natives ==
- Ioan Neag (born 1994), footballer
