= ITU country code =

ITU country code may refer to:

- Telephone country code E.164, see List of telephone country codes
- Mobile country code E.212
- ITU letter code for countries, see List of ITU letter codes

== See also ==
- International Telecommunication Union
- ITU prefix
- Country code
