= Sălaș =

- Location within Romania

Location
- Country: Romania
- Counties: Hunedoara County
- Villages: Sălașu de Sus, Sălașu de Jos, Ohaba de sub Piatră

Physical characteristics
- Mouth: Strei
  - location: Ohaba de sub Piatră
  - coordinates: 45.5479°N 22.9909°E
- Length: 17 km (11 mi)
- Basin size: 32 km^{2} (12 sq mi)

Basin features
- Progression: Strei→ Mureș→ Tisza→ Danube→ Black Sea

The Sălaș (also: Mălăești) is a left tributary of the river Strei in Romania. It discharges into the Strei in Ohaba de sub Piatră. Its length is 17 km (11 mi) and its basin size is 32 km^{2} (12 sq mi).
