= Pianul =

Pianul Pián-patak
- Location within Romania

Location
- Country: Romania
- Counties: Alba County
- Villages: Strungari, Pianu de Sus, Pianu de Jos, Vințu de Jos

Physical characteristics
- Mouth: Mureș
  - location: Vințu de Jos
  - coordinates: 45.9966°N 23.4728°E
- Length: 33 km (21 mi)
- Basin size: 122 km^{2} (47 sq mi)

Basin features
- Progression: Mureș→ Tisza→ Danube→ Black Sea
- Tributaries
  - left: Penelu Recii, Ghenea, Valea Lei
  - right: Valea Tonii

The Pianul (Hungarian: Pián-patak) is a left tributary of the river Mureș in Transylvania, Romania. It discharges into the Mureș in Vințu de Jos. Its length is 33 km (21 mi) and its basin size is 122 km^{2} (47 sq mi).
