= Șureanu Mountains =

Mountains in Romania

Coordinates: 45°41′30″N 23°17′30″E

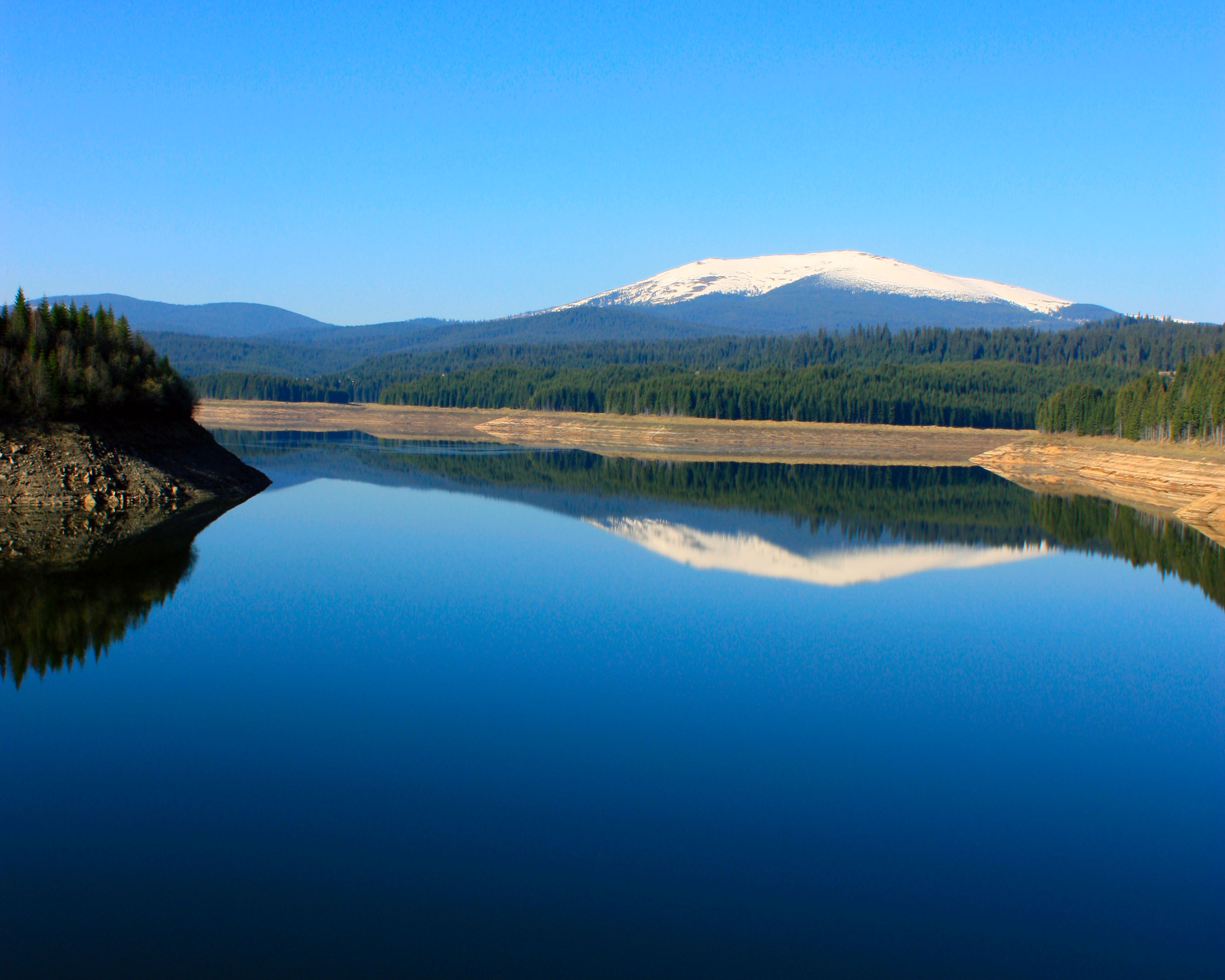
Vârfu lui Pătru, seen from the Oașa Dam

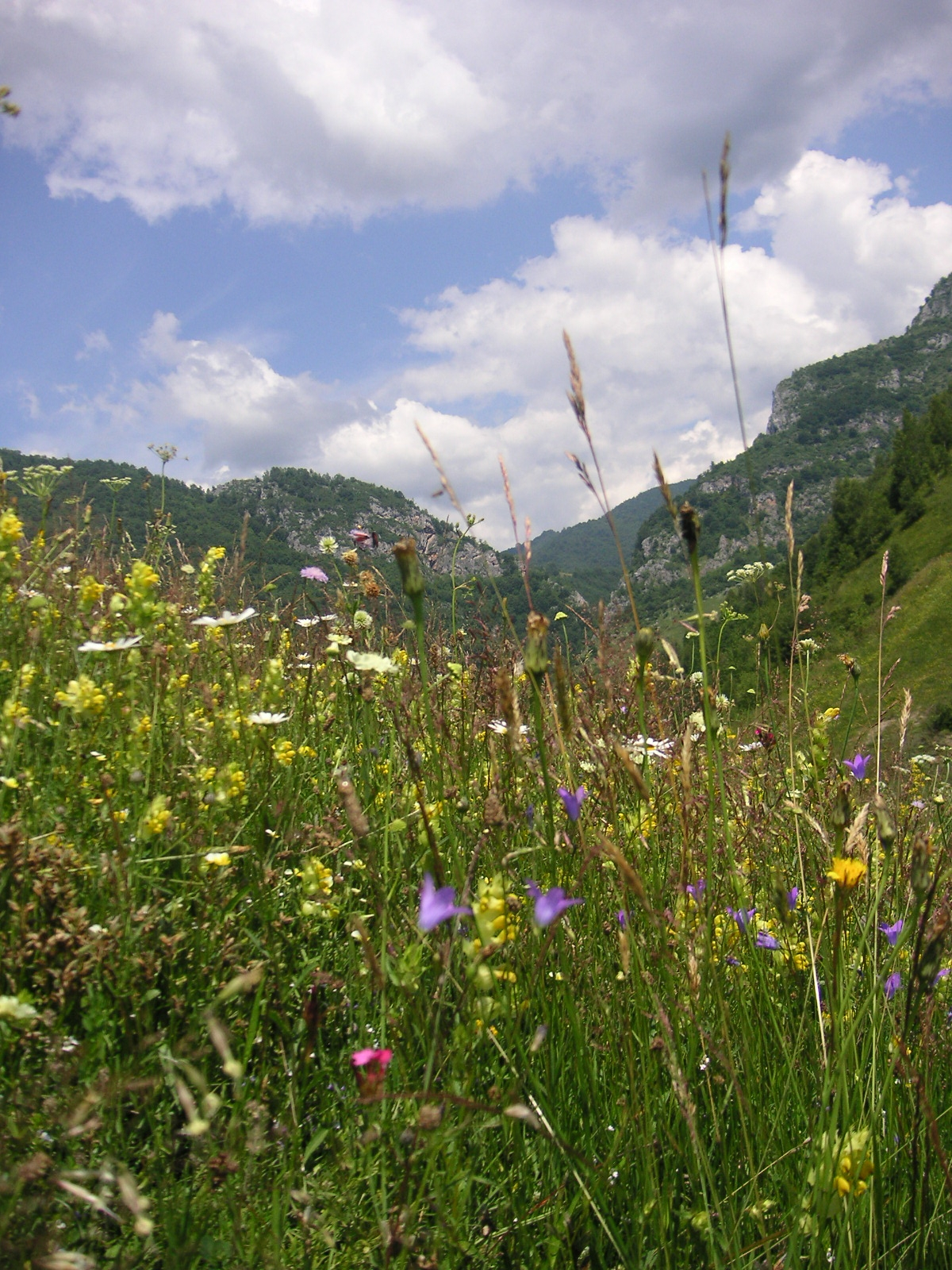
View from the Șureanu Mountains

The Șureanu Mountains (German: Mühlbacher Gebirge, Hungarian: Kudzsiri-havasok), belong to Romania's Parâng range in the Southern Carpathians, with peaks frequently exceeding 2,000 metres (6,600 ft).

The mountains are located north of Romania's Jiu Valley, in the Hunedoara and Alba counties. They border the Cindrel Mountains to the east and the Lotru Mountains to the southeast. The Parâng Mountains are to the south, separated by the Jiul de Est River. To the west, across the Hațeg Depression and the Orăștie Corridor, lie the Retezat Mountains and the Poiana Ruscă Mountains, while to the north, across the Mureș River valley, lie the Apuseni Mountains.

The Șureanu Mountains are divided into the Sebeș Mountains to the east and the Orăștiei Mountains to the west. In all, they cover an area of 1,585 square kilometres (612 sq mi). The highest peak is Peter's Peak (Vârfu lui Pătru), at 2,130 metres (6,990 ft); other peaks are Șureanu Peak, at 2,059 m (6,755 ft) and Vârfu Negru, at 1,862 m (6,109 ft), as well as Aușelu, Comărnicelul, Gropșoara, and Pârva peaks. They are primarily a highland with meadows and pastures, with very large forested area throughout the surrounding 1,200 to 1,400 metres (3,900 to 4,600 ft) high mountains. In the southern area of these mountains there is a limestone region with several caves, hills, and gorges.

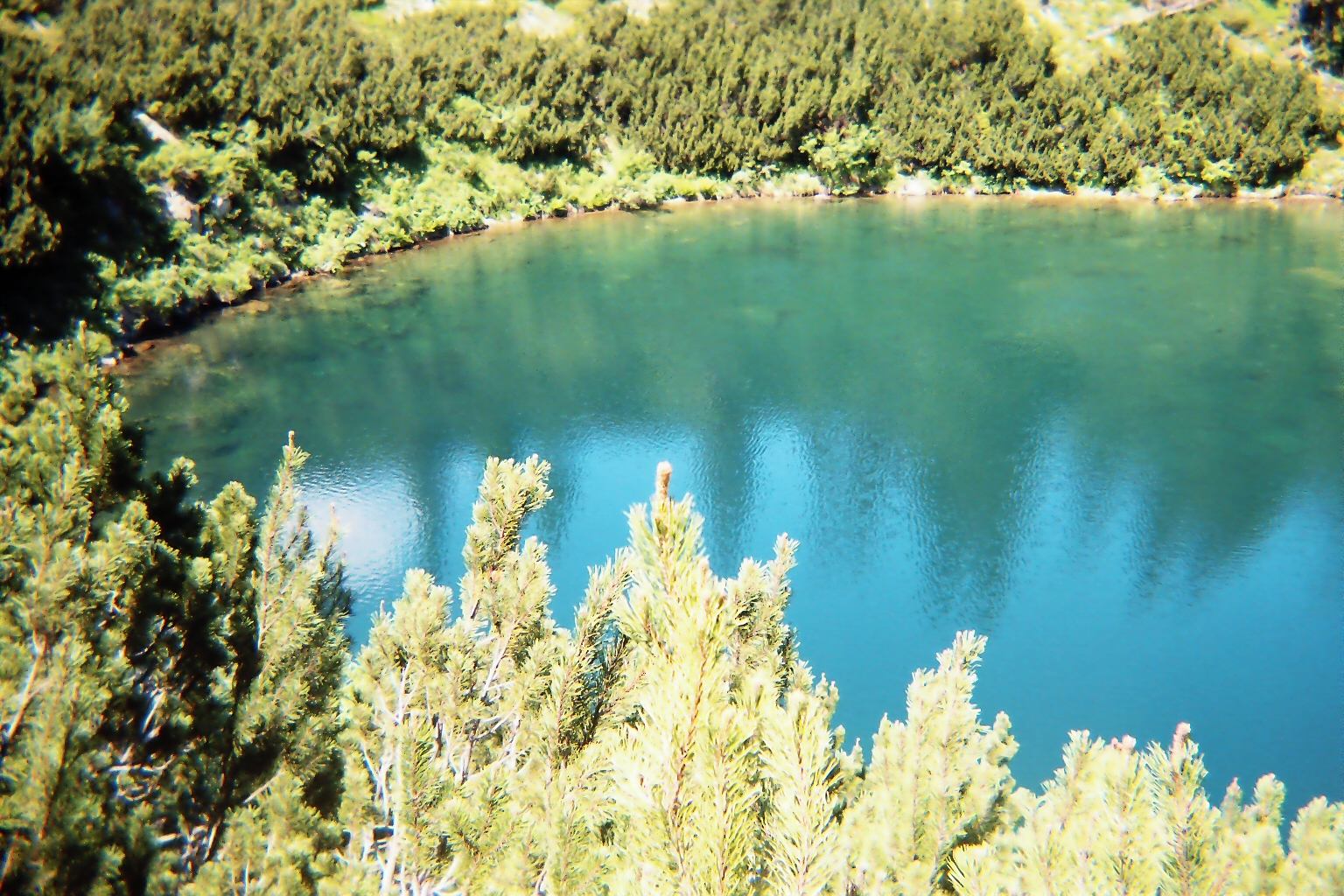
Lake Șureanu

Lake Șureanu (also known as the Bottomless Lake) is a glacial lake situated at an altitude of 1,737 m (5,699 ft), east of Șureanu Peak. It covers 0.5 hectares (1.2 acres), has length 100 m (330 ft), maximum width of 60 m (200 ft), and maximum depth of 7.4 m (24 ft).

The Șureanu Mountains are traversed by several rivers, mostly flowing north towards the Mureș.

- The Cugir River has its source under Peter's Peak, at an altitude of 1,900 m (6,200 ft); it starts at the confluence of headwaters Râul Mare and Râul Mic in the town of Cugir.
- The Orăștie River has its source near Zebru Mountain, at an altitude of 1,659 m (5,443 ft).
- The Pianul River has its source in Pianu commune.
- The Sebeș River starts from the Oașa Lake and separates the Șureanu and Cindrel mountains.
- The Strei River has its source above Baru commune.
