= Râul Alb (Strei) =

Râul Alb Vasielu
- Location within Romania

Location
- Country: Romania
- Counties: Hunedoara County
- Villages: Coroiești, Râu Alb

Physical characteristics
- Mouth: Strei
  - location: Ohaba de sub Piatră
  - coordinates: 45.5447°N 23.0028°E
- Length: 22 km (14 mi)
- Basin size: 44 km^{2} (17 sq mi)

Basin features
- Progression: Strei→ Mureș→ Tisza→ Danube→ Black Sea
- Tributaries
  - left: Scoaba Seacă, Cătânașe, Valea Ascunsă, Dâlma cu Mesteacăn
  - right: Gorova, Râul Șerenilor, Vaidei
- River code: IV.1.117.10

The Râul Alb is a left tributary of the river Strei in Romania. The upper reach of the river is also known as Vasielu. It flows into the Strei in Ohaba de sub Piatră. Its length is 22 km (14 mi) and its basin size is 44 km^{2} (17 sq mi).
