= Muncuqlu, Lachin =

Muncuqlu
- Location within Azerbaijan Location within East Zangezur Economic Region
- Coordinates: 39°49′13″N 46°23′01″E
- Country: Azerbaijan
- Rayon: Lachin
- Time zone: UTC+4 (AZT)
  - Summer (DST): UTC+5 (AZT)

Muncuqlu (also, Munjuglu, Munjukhlu) is a village in the Lachin Rayon of Azerbaijan.
