= Sălașu de Sus =

- Commune
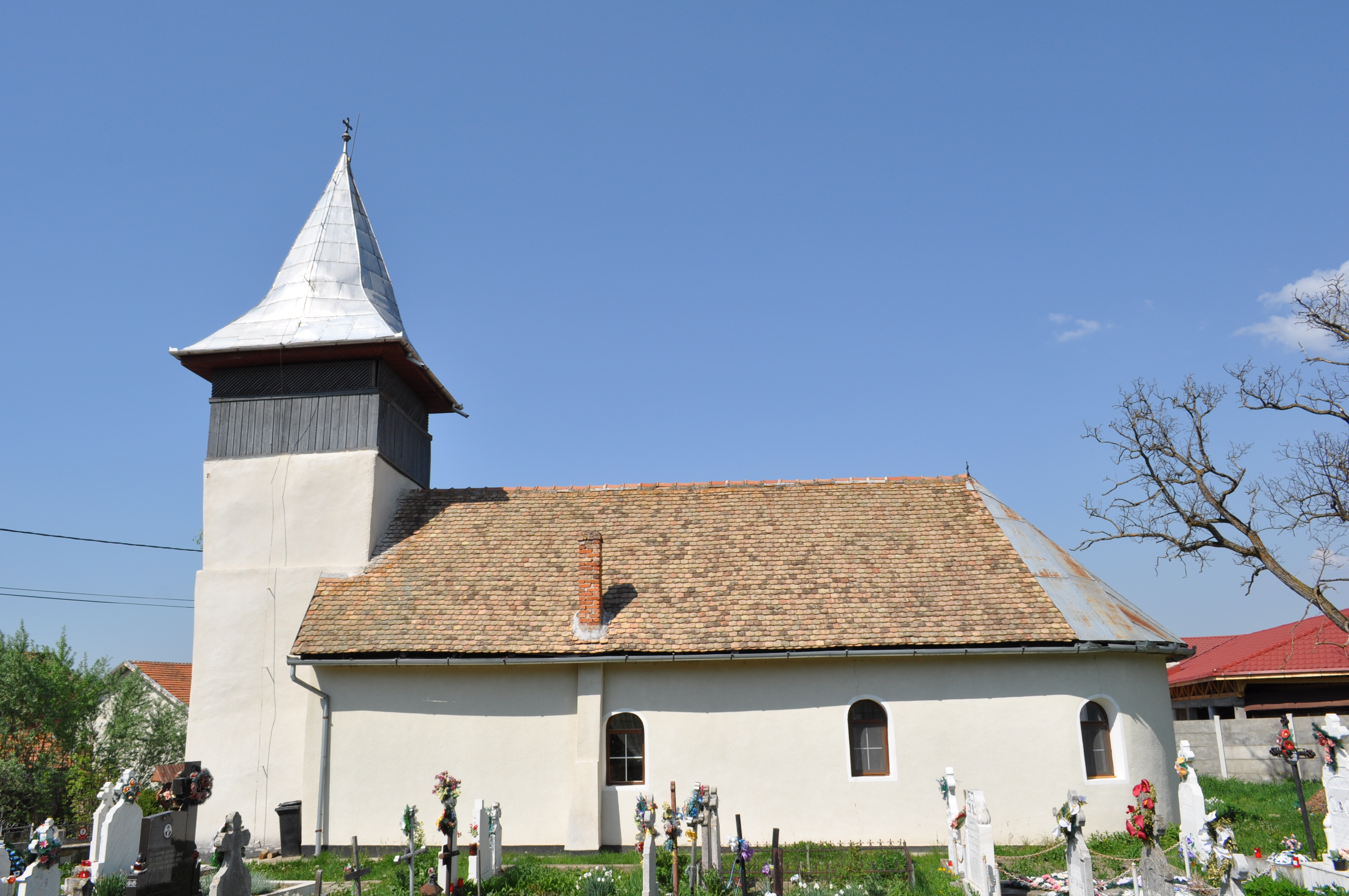
- Nemesh Church in Sălașu de Sus

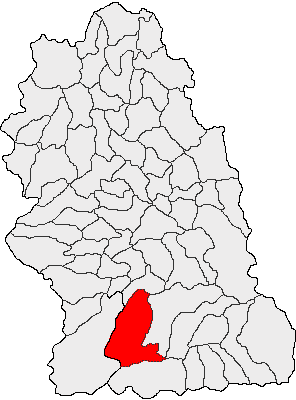
- Location in Hunedoara County

- Location in Romania
- Coordinates: 45°31′N 22°57′E
- Country: Romania
- County: Hunedoara

Government
  - Mayor (2024–2028): Ioan Vlad (PSD)
- Area: 223.05 km^{2} (86.12 sq mi)
- Elevation: 479 m (1,572 ft)
- Population (2021-12-01): 2,142
  - Density: 9.603/km^{2} (24.87/sq mi)
- Time zone: UTC+02:00 (EET)
  - Summer (DST): UTC+03:00 (EEST)
- Postal code: 337420
- Area code: (+40) 02 54
- Vehicle reg.: HD
- Website: comuna-salasudesus.ro

Sălașu de Sus (Hungarian: Felsőszálláspatak, German: Ober-Bachdorf) is a commune in Hunedoara County, Transylvania, Romania. It is composed of eleven villages: Coroiești (Korojesd), Mălăiești (Malajesd), Nucșoara (Nuksora), Ohaba de sub Piatră (Kőaljaohába), Paroș (Parospestere), Peștera (Pestere), Râu Alb (Fehérvíz), Râu Mic (Vajdej), Sălașu de Jos (Alsószálláspatak), Sălașu de Sus, and Zăvoi (Macesd).

The commune lies at the foot of the Retezat Mountains, on the banks of the river Strei and several of its tributaries: the Paroș, Râul Alb, Sălaș, and Sibișel rivers. Two thirds of the commune's 223.05 ha (551.2 acres) area is used for agriculture.

Sălașu de Sus is located in the southern part of Hunedoara County, 70 km (43 mi) south of the county seat, Deva. It is situated in the historical and ethnographical area known as Țara Hațegului, 13 km (8.1 mi) south of its hub, the town of Hațeg. The commune is crossed by national road DN66, part of European route E79. The Ohaba de sub Piatră halt serves the CFR Simeria–Petroșani–Târgu Jiu–Filiași railway line 202.

The Mălăiești Fortress dates from the beginning of the 14th century; completed around 1588, it was abandoned in the 17th century. It features a dungeon and stone ring enclosure, to which four polygonal towers were later added. The Cândreș knyazes' court and the Nemesh Church (both in Sălașu de Sus village) were built in the 15th and 16th century, respectively. The Church of the Ascension in Nucșoara dates from the 18th century; the interior painting was done in 1779 by Simion Zugravul.

A massive coal preparation plant was built in Coroiești in the early 1960s, with a projected capacity of washing 750 tonnes of coal per hour. Once described as the "pearl" of the mining industry of Romania, the plant was modernized in 2004 at a cost of $150 million, but it was closed in 2015.

Historical population
Year	Pop.	±%
1850	4,557	—
1900	5,091	+11.7%
2002	2,782	−45.4%
2011	2,359	−15.2%
2021	2,142	−9.2%
Source: INS, Census data

== Natives ==
- Ion Itu (1935–2006), literary critic and essayist
