= Cugir (river) =

Cugir Kudzsir-patak
- Location within Romania

Location
- Country: Romania
- Counties: Alba County
- Villages: Cugir, Vinerea, Șibot

Physical characteristics
- Source: confluence of headwaters Râul Mare and Râul Mic
  - location: Cugir
  - coordinates: 45.8246°N 23.3763°E
- Mouth: Mureș
  - location: Șibot
  - coordinates: 45.9486°N 23.3431°E
- Length: 67 km (42 mi)
- Basin size: 358 km^{2} (138 sq mi)

Basin features
- Progression: Mureș→ Tisza→ Danube→ Black Sea
- Tributaries
  - left: Râul Mic
  - right: Râul Mare, Chișag

The Cugir (Hungarian: Kudzsir-patak) is a left tributary of the river Mureș in Romania. It discharges into the Mureș near Șibot. Its length is 67 km (42 mi) (including its headwater Râul Mare) and its basin size is 358 km^{2} (138 sq mi).

== Course ==
The river starts at the confluence of headwaters Râul Mare and Râul Mic in the town Cugir. Both rivers have their source in the Șureanu Mountains. From Cugir, the river flows north and discharges into the Mureș near Șibot. In the final 3 km before the confluence, two branches split from the main river: one towards the left along the village Șibot, one towards the right along the village Balomiru de Câmp.
