= Râul Mic (Cugir) =

- Location within Romania

Location
- Country: Romania
- Counties: Alba County

Physical characteristics
- Mouth: Cugir
  - location: Cugir
  - coordinates: 45.8246°N 23.3763°E
- Length: 28 km (17 mi)
- Basin size: 85 km^{2} (33 sq mi)

Basin features
- Progression: Cugir→ Mureș→ Tisza→ Danube→ Black Sea

The Râul Mic is the left headwater of the river Cugir in Romania. At its confluence with the Râul Mare in the town Cugir, the river Cugir is formed. Its length is 28 km (17 mi) and its basin size is 85 km^{2} (33 sq mi).

== Tributaries ==
The following rivers are tributaries to the Râul Mic (from source to mouth):

- Left: Scârna, Tisa, Arieș, Valea Prihodiștei, Brădet
- Right: Răchita
