= Bretea Română =

- Commune
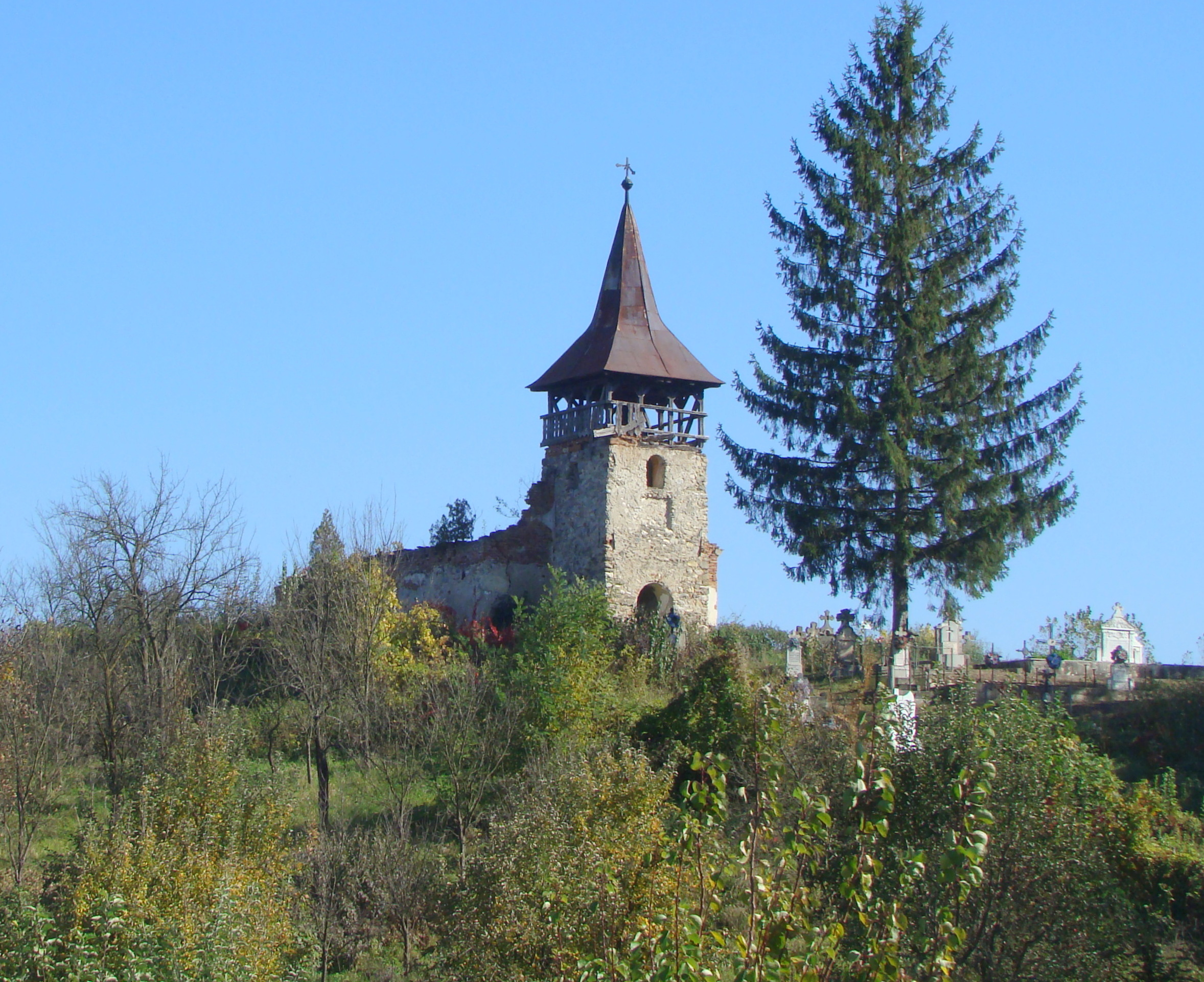
- Ruins of the Saints Archangels Michael and Gabriel Church (1781)

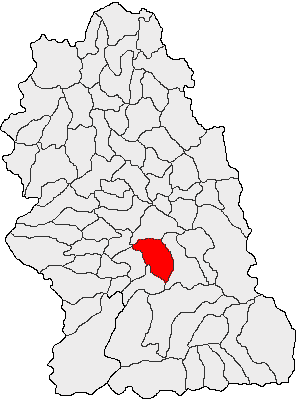
- Location in Hunedoara County

- Location in Romania
- Coordinates: 45°39′35″N 23°01′00″E
- Country: Romania
- County: Hunedoara

Government
  - Mayor (2024–2028): Răzvan Ciprian Ionescu-Gruia (PSD)
- Area: 100.36 km^{2} (38.75 sq mi)
- Elevation: 281 m (922 ft)
- Population (2021-12-01): 2,969
  - Density: 29.58/km^{2} (76.62/sq mi)
- Time zone: UTC+02:00 (EET)
  - Summer (DST): UTC+03:00 (EEST)
- Postal code: 337115
- Area code: (+40) 02 54
- Vehicle reg.: HD
- Website: www.bretea-romana.ro

Bretea Română (German: Brettendorf; Hungarian: Oláhbrettye) is a commune in Hunedoara County, Transylvania, Romania. It is composed of thirteen villages: Bățălar (Bacalár), Bercu (Berkány), Bretea Română, Bretea Streiului (Magyarbrettye), Covragiu (Kovrágy), Gânțaga (Goncága), Măceu (Mácsó), Ocolișu Mare (Nagyoklos), Plopi (Sztrigyplop), Ruși (Russ), Vâlcele (Pokolvalcsel), Vâlcelele Bune (Jóvalcsel), and Vâlceluța.

Historical population
| Year | Pop. | ±% |
|---|---|---|
| 1850 | 5,543 | — |
| 1910 | 5,995 | +8.2% |
| 2002 | 3,133 | −47.7% |
| 2011 | 3,052 | −2.6% |
| 2021 | 2,969 | −2.7% |
Source: Census data

== Natives ==
- Mircea Păcurariu (1932–2021), theologian, historian, and priest in the Romanian Orthodox Church
