= Râul Mare (Cugir) =

Râul Mare Canciu
- Location within Romania

Location
- Country: Romania
- Counties: Alba County

Physical characteristics
- Mouth: Cugir
  - location: Cugir
  - coordinates: 45.8246°N 23.3763°E
- Length: 48 km (30 mi)
- Basin size: 211 km^{2} (81 sq mi)

Basin features
- Progression: Cugir→ Mureș→ Tisza→ Danube→ Black Sea

The Râul Mare (in its upper course also: Canciu) is the right headwater of the river Cugir in Romania. At its confluence with the Râul Mic in the town Cugir, the river Cugir is formed. Its length is 48 km (30 mi) and its basin size is 211 km^{2} (81 sq mi).

== Tributaries ==
The following rivers are tributaries to the Râul Mare (from source to mouth):

- Left: Zănoaga, Boșorog, Preluca, Moliviș, Chicera, Răchita, Brustura
- Right: Prisaca, Păltinei, Izvorul Căldării, Tomnatecu
