= Baru, Hunedoara =

Baru
- Commune
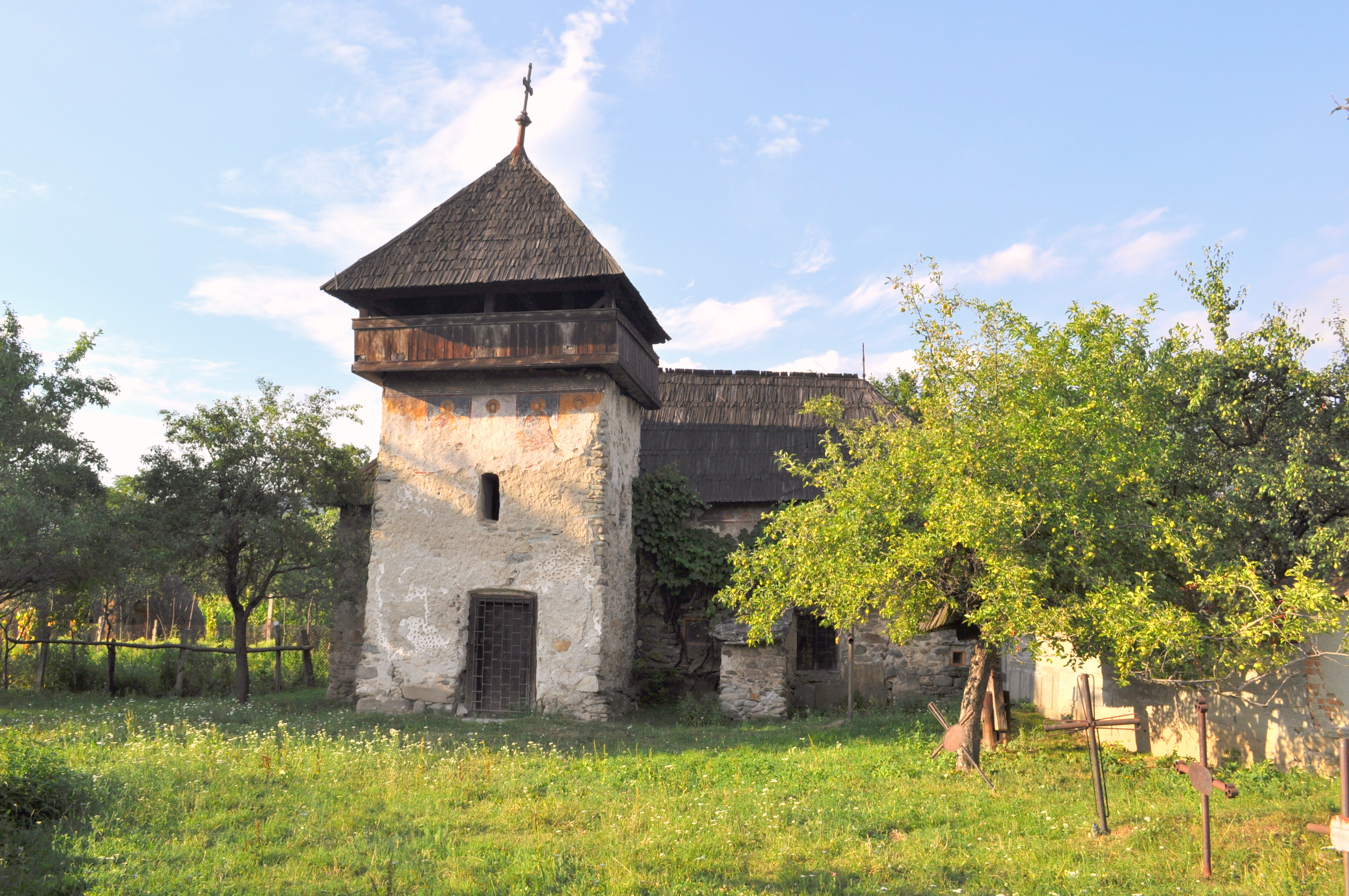
- Elijah the Prophet Church in Baru

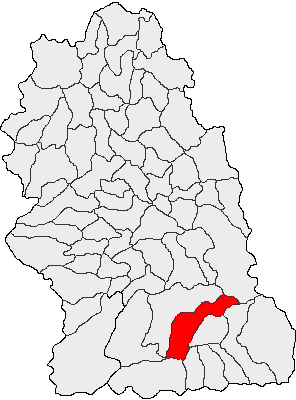
- Location in Hunedoara County

- Location in Romania
- Coordinates: 45°28′N 23°10′E
- Country: Romania
- County: Hunedoara

Government
  - Mayor (2024–2028): Daniel Răducanu (PNL)
- Area: 145.71 km^{2} (56.26 sq mi)
- Elevation: 460 m (1,510 ft)
- Population (2021-12-01): 2,425
  - Density: 16.64/km^{2} (43.10/sq mi)
- Time zone: UTC+02:00 (EET)
  - Summer (DST): UTC+03:00 (EEST)
- Postal code: 337035
- Area code: (+40) 02 54
- Vehicle reg.: HD
- Website: www.primariabaru.ro

Baru (Hungarian: Nagybár, German: Groß-Elephant) is a commune in Hunedoara County, Transylvania, Romania. It is composed of four villages: Baru, Livadia (Mezőlivádia), Petros (Petrosz), and Valea Lupului (Farkaspatak).

The Grădiștea Muncelului-Cioclovina Natural Park is partly located on the territory of the commune.

Historical population
Year	Pop.	±%
1850	2,457	—
1966	3,888	+58.2%
2002	3,044	−21.7%
2011	2,696	−11.4%
2021	2,425	−10.1%
Source: Census data

At the 2021 census, the commune had a population of 2,425; of those, 89.32% were Romanians and 2.14% were Roma.
