= Răchiți =

- Commune
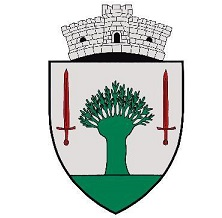
- Coat of arms

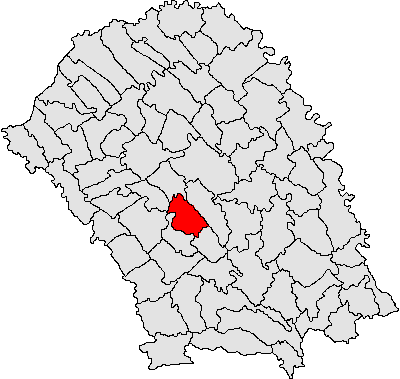
- Location in Botoșani County

- Location in Romania
- Coordinates: 47°46′N 26°41′E
- Country: Romania
- County: Botoșani
- Subdivisions: Răchiți, Cișmea, Costești, Roșiori

Government
  - Mayor (2024–2028): Florin Dan Bulgaru (PNL)
- Area: 71.56 km^{2} (27.63 sq mi)
- Elevation: 120 m (390 ft)
- Population (2021-12-01): 5,212
  - Density: 72.83/km^{2} (188.6/sq mi)
- Time zone: UTC+02:00 (EET)
  - Summer (DST): UTC+03:00 (EEST)
- Postal code: 717310
- Area code: +40 x31
- Vehicle reg.: BT

Răchiți is a commune in Botoșani County, Western Moldavia, Romania. It is composed of four villages: Cișmea, Costești, Răchiți, and Roșiori.

== Natives ==
- Victor Babiuc
- Iacob Iacobovici
