= Pui =

- Commune
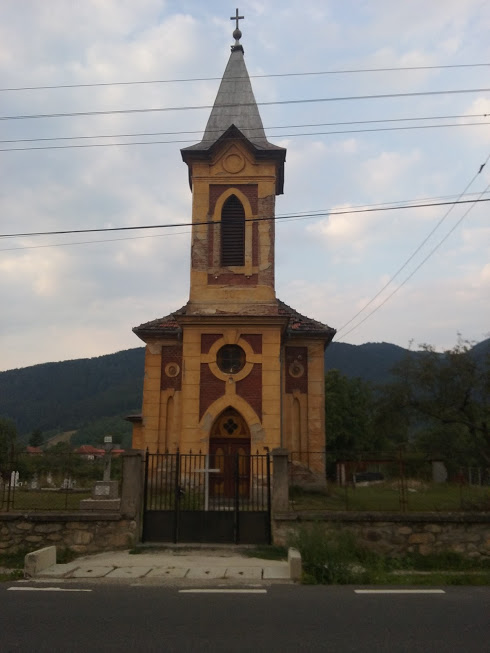
- Roman Catholic church in Pui

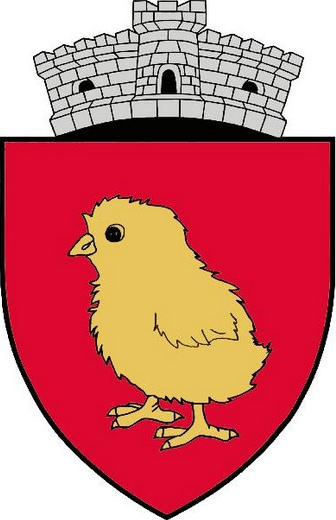
- Coat of arms

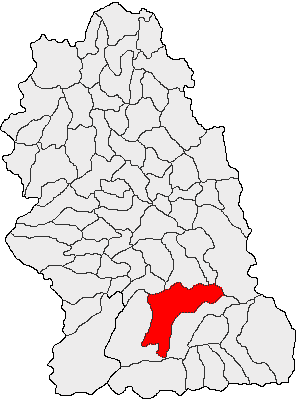
- Location in Hunedoara County

- Location in Romania
- Coordinates: 45°31′N 23°06′E
- Country: Romania
- County: Hunedoara

Government
  - Mayor (2024–2028): Ovidiu Ciolea (PNL)
- Area: 228.79 km^{2} (88.34 sq mi)
- Elevation: 416 m (1,365 ft)
- Population (2021-12-01): 3,682
  - Density: 16.09/km^{2} (41.68/sq mi)
- Time zone: UTC+02:00 (EET)
  - Summer (DST): UTC+03:00 (EEST)
- Postal code: 337345
- Area code: (+40) 02 54
- Vehicle reg.: HD
- Website: primaria-pui.ro

Pui (Hungarian: Puj, German: Hühnendorf) is a commune in Hunedoara County, Transylvania, Romania. It is composed of twelve villages: Băiești (Bajesd), Federi (Fégyér), Fizești (Füzesd), Galați (Galac), Hobița (Hobica), Ohaba-Ponor (Ohábaponor), Ponor (Ponor), Pui, Râu Bărbat (Borbátvíz), Rușor (Rusor), Șerel (Serél), and Uric (Urik).

The commune is situated north of the Retezat Mountains, on the banks of the Strei River and its tributaries, the rivers Bărbat and Ohaba. Pui is located in the southern half of Hunedoara County, 17 km (11 mi) southeast of the town of Hațeg, and 54 km (34 mi) south of the county seat, Deva.

Historical population
Year	Pop.	±%
1850	5,245	—
1900	6,966	+32.8%
1941	6,520	−6.4%
1977	5,788	−11.2%
2002	4,745	−18.0%
2011	4,122	−13.1%
2021	3,682	−10.7%
Source: Census data

== Natives ==
- Liviu Comes (1918–2004), composer and musicologist
- Marius Păcurar (born 1974), footballer

== See also ==
- Castra of Federi
