= List of rivers of Romania: R =

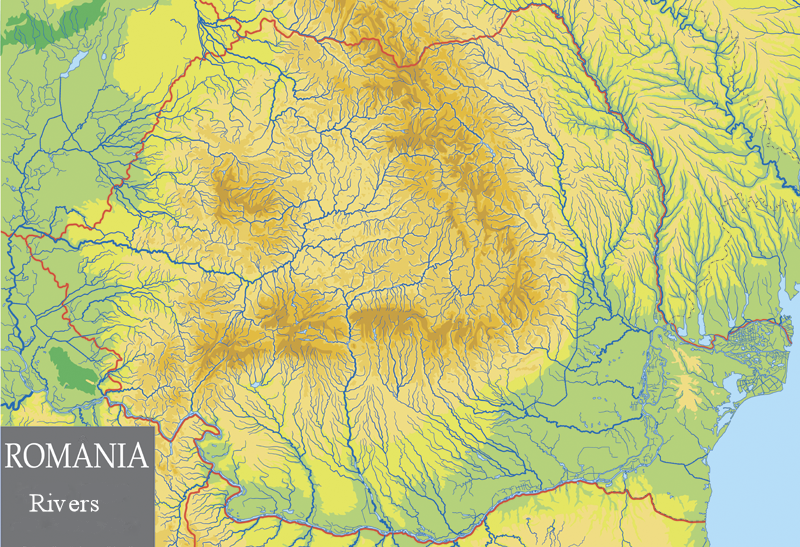
Map of Romania's hydrographic network

== R ==
River	Tributary of
Răcăciuni	Siret
Răcătău	Siret
Răcătău	Someșul Rece
Rachiș	Aiud
Răchita	Borod
Răchita	Nera
Răchitiș	Tazlău
Răchitova	Râul Galben
Raciu	Ialomița
Racova	Bârlad
Racovița	Ialomița
Racovița	Olt near Făgăraș
Racta	Tur
Racul	Olt
Râiosul	Câlniștea
Râmești	Pârâul Urșanilor
Râmna	Putna
Râmnic	Casimcea
Râmnicel	Râmnicul Sărat
Râmnicul Sărat	Siret
Râncăciov	Argeș
Ranica	Belareca
Râoaia	Lăpuș
Râpa	Mureș
Râpa	Vișa
Rasa	Argeș

River	Tributary of
Râșca	Moldova (Suceava County)
Râșca	Moldova (Neamț County)
Râșca	Someșul Cald
Râșca Mare	Someșul Rece
Rașcuța	Râmna
Râșcuța	Râșca
Râșnoava	Prahova
Rasova	Jaleș
Răstolița	Mureș
Răstolț	Agrij
Rât	Ier
Rât	Mureș
Rătășel	Crișul Negru
Râul Alb	Dâmbovița
Râul Alb	Strei
Râul Doamnei	Argeș
Râul Galben	Râul Mare
Râul Mare	Bârsa
Râul Mare	Cugir
Râul Mare	Strei
Râul Mic	Cibin
Râul Mic	Cugir
Râul Negru	Olt
Râul Târgului	Râul Doamnei

River	Tributary of
Râura	Vișa
Râușor	Bratia
Râușor	Breazova
Râușor	Dâmbovița
Râușor	Mara
Râușor	Râul Mare
Râușor	Râul Târgului
Raznic	Jiu
Rebra	Someșul Mare
Rebricea	Bârlad
Recea	Cerna
Recea	Miletin
Rediu	Bahlueț
Rediu	Dobrovăț
Reghiu	Milcov
Repedea	Latorița
Repedea	Ruscova
Repedea	Vișeu
Rezu Mare	Putna
Ribița	Crișul Alb
Rimetea	Arieș
Robaia	Vâlsan
Robești	Olt
Rod	Apold
Rohia	Lăpuș
Românești	Valea Neagră

River	Tributary of
Români	Bistrița
Romanul	Gilort
Romos	Mureș
Rona	Iza
Roșcani	Chineja
Roșia Montană	Abrud
Rosua	Șieu
Rotunda	Lăpuș
Ruda	Suceava
Rudăreasa	Latorița
Rudăria	Nera
Rudi	Pârâul Galben
Ruja	Siret
Ruja	Tazlăul Sărat
Runc	Jaleș
Runc	Someșul Mare
Runcșor	Șoimuș
Rușavăț	Călmățui
Rusca	Bistra
Rusca	Bistrița (left bank)
Rusca	Bistrița (right bank)
Rusciori	Cibin
Ruscova	Vișeu
Rușor	Strei
