= Râu de Mori =

- Commune
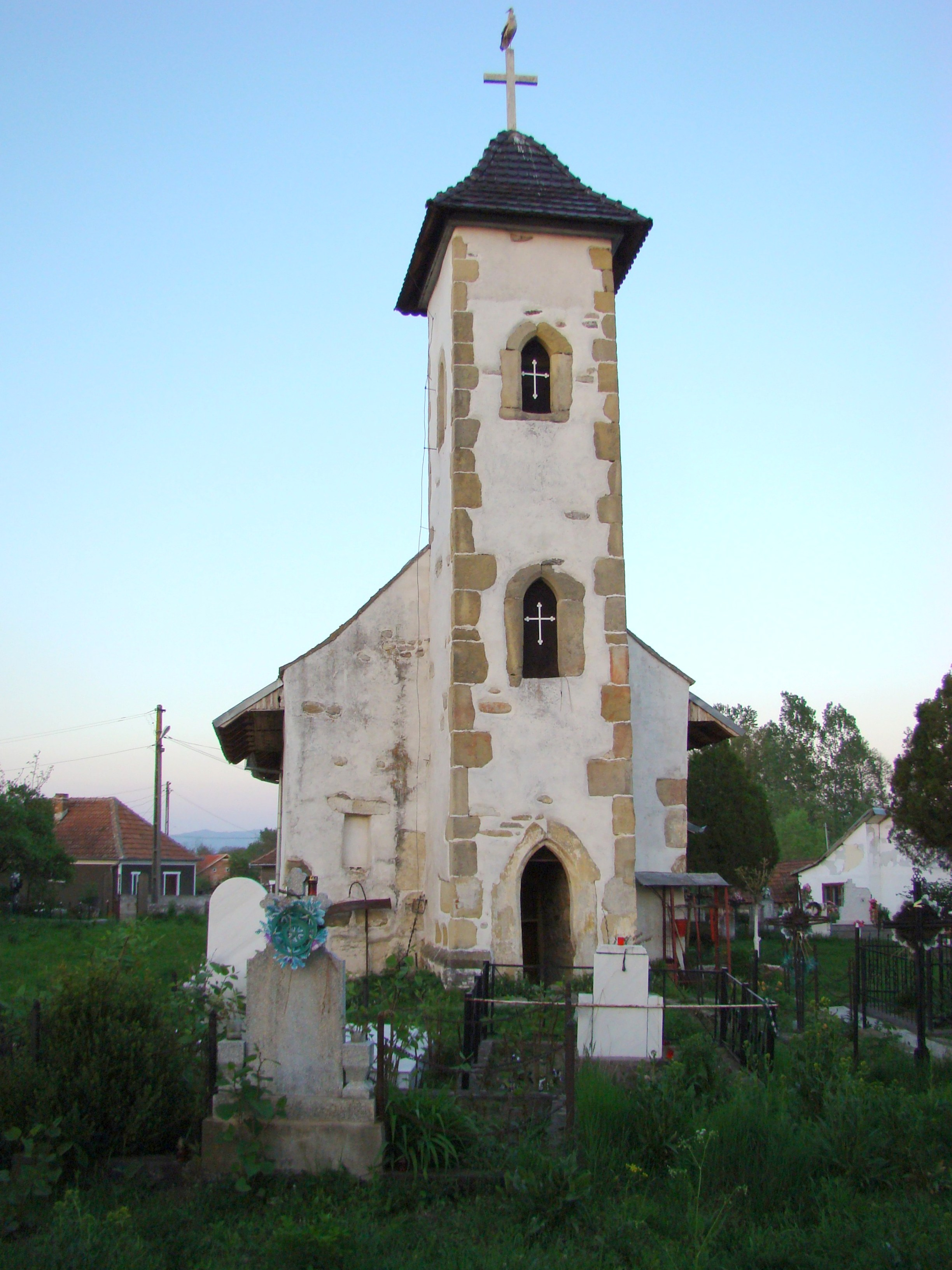
- Church of the Pentecost in Ostrov

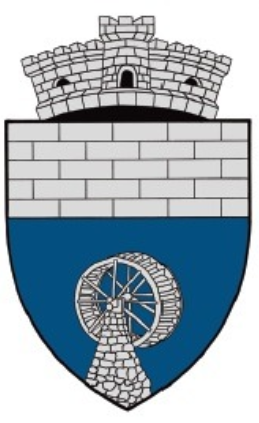
- Coat of arms

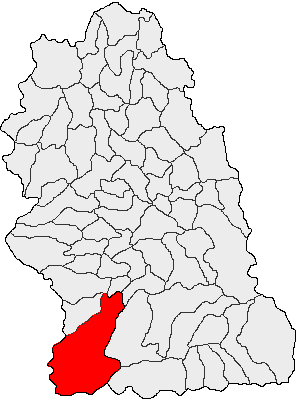
- Location in Hunedoara County

- Location in Romania
- Coordinates: 45°30′N 22°51′E
- Country: Romania
- County: Hunedoara

Government
  - Mayor (2024–2028): Flaviu Dilertea (PSD)
- Area: 386.12 km^{2} (149.08 sq mi)
- Elevation: 506 m (1,660 ft)
- Population (2021-12-01): 2,991
  - Density: 7.746/km^{2} (20.06/sq mi)
- Time zone: UTC+02:00 (EET)
  - Summer (DST): UTC+03:00 (EEST)
- Postal code: 337380
- Area code: +(40) 0254
- Vehicle reg.: HD
- Website: raudemori.ro

Râu de Mori (Hungarian: Malomvíz, German: Mühlendorf) is a commune in Hunedoara County, Transylvania, Romania. It is composed of eleven villages: Brazi (Gureny), Clopotiva (Klopotiva), Ohaba-Sibișel (Ohábasibisel), Ostrov (Nagyosztró), Ostrovel (Osztrovel), Ostrovu Mic (Kisosztró), Râu de Mori, Sibișel (Sebeshely), Suseni (Malomvízszuszény), Unciuc (Uncsukfalva), and Valea Dâljii (Vályadilsi).

The commune is situated at a mean altitude of 506 m (1,660 ft), at the foot of the Retezat Mountains. It lies on the banks of the Râul Mare and its right tributaries, the Râușor and the Sibișel. The Gura Apelor Dam forms a reservoir, from which water is piped to the Râul Mare Hydroelectric Power Station, that generates 650 GWh of electricity per year.

Râu de Mori is located at the southeastern extremity of Hunedoara County, 54 km (34 mi) south of the county seat, Deva, on the border with Caraș-Severin and Gorj counties. It is situated in the historical and ethnographical area known as Țara Hațegului, about 17 km (11 mi) southeast of its hub, the town of Hațeg.

At the 2021 census, the commune had a population of 2,991; of those, 91.64% were Romanians and 1.71% Roma.

Historical population
Year	Pop.	±%
1850	3,781	—
1977	5,304	+40.3%
2002	3,546	−33.1%
2011	3,153	−11.1%
2021	2,991	−5.1%
Source: INS, Census data
