= Țara Hațegului =

Area of Romania

Coordinates: 45°35′N 22°55′E

Țara Hațegului ("Hațeg Land"; German: Wallenthal, Hungarian: Hátszegvidék, Latin: terra Harszoc) is a historical and ethnographical area in Hunedoara County, Romania, in the south-western corner of Transylvania. It is centered in the town of Hațeg.

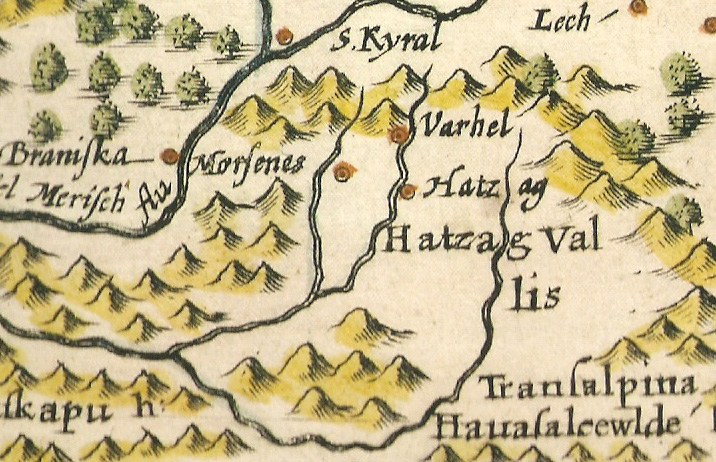
Hațeg (Hatzag) Land on a map from 1607.

Țara Hațegului is located in the Depression of Hațeg. Here there are: the site of Ulpia Traiana Sarmizegetusa (the capital of the Roman Dacia, established in the 2nd century A.D.), the Densuș Church and palaeontological remains (see Hațeg Island and Hatzegopteryx).

Under the Kingdom of Hungary, the Hátszeg District was part of Hunyad County.

The region is composed of one town and ten communes: Hațeg, Baru, Densuș, General Berthelot, Pui, Răchitova, Râu de Mori, Sarmizegetusa, Sălașu de Sus, Sântămăria-Orlea and Totești.
