= Răcătău =

Răcătău may refer to several entities in Romania:

- Răcătău, a village in Blandiana Commune, Alba County
- Măguri-Răcătău, a commune in Cluj County
- Răcătău-Răzeși and Răcătău de Jos, villages in Horgești Commune, Bacău County
- Răcătău (Siret), a tributary of the Siret in Bacău County
- Răcătău (Someș), a tributary of the Someșul Rece in Cluj County
