= Răchitova (river) =

- Location within Romania

Location
- Country: Romania
- Counties: Hunedoara County
- Villages: Răchitova, Ciula Mică, Ciula Mare

Physical characteristics
- Source: Poiana Ruscă Mountains
- Mouth: Râul Galben
  - location: Upstream of Tuștea
  - coordinates: 45.5912°N 22.8368°E
- Length: 14 km (8.7 mi)
- Basin size: 51 km^{2} (20 sq mi)

Basin features
- Progression: Râul Galben→ Râul Mare→ Strei→ Mureș→ Tisza→ Danube→ Black Sea

The Răchitova is a left tributary of the Râul Galben in Romania. It flows into the Râul Galben near Tuștea. Its length is 14 km (8.7 mi) and its basin size is 51 km^{2} (20 sq mi).
