= Pârâul de Câmp =

River in Romania

- Location within Romania

Location
- Country: Romania
- Counties: Hunedoara County

Physical characteristics
- Source: Poiana Ruscă Mountains
- Mouth: Râul Galben
  - location: Fărcădin
  - coordinates: 45.6037°N 22.8649°E
- Length: 19 km (12 mi)
- Basin size: 27 km^{2} (10 sq mi)

Basin features
- Progression: Râul Galben→ Râul Mare→ Strei→ Mureș→ Tisza→ Danube→ Black Sea

The Pârâul de Câmp is a right tributary of the Râul Galben in Romania. It flows into the Râul Galben near Fărcădin. Its length is 19 km (12 mi) and its basin size is 27 km^{2} (10 sq mi).
