= Râușor (Breazova) =

- Location within Romania

Location
- Country: Romania
- Counties: Hunedoara County
- Villages: Hobița-Grădiște

Physical characteristics
- Source: Poiana Ruscă Mountains
- Mouth: Breazova
  - location: Sarmizegetusa
  - coordinates: 45.5209°N 22.7829°E
- Length: 11 km (6.8 mi)
- Basin size: 15 km^{2} (5.8 sq mi)

Basin features
- Progression: Breazova→ Râul Galben→ Râul Mare→ Strei→ Mureș→ Tisza→ Danube→ Black Sea

The Râușor is a right tributary of the river Breazova in Romania. It flows into the Breazova in Sarmizegetusa. Its length is 11 km (6.8 mi) and its basin size is 15 km^{2} (5.8 sq mi).
