= Lăncița River =

Lănciţa River may refer to one of the following rivers in Romania:

- Lăncița River (Zlata) - (also known as Lănciţa de la Stână), tributary of the Zlata River
