= Sântămăria-Orlea =

- Commune
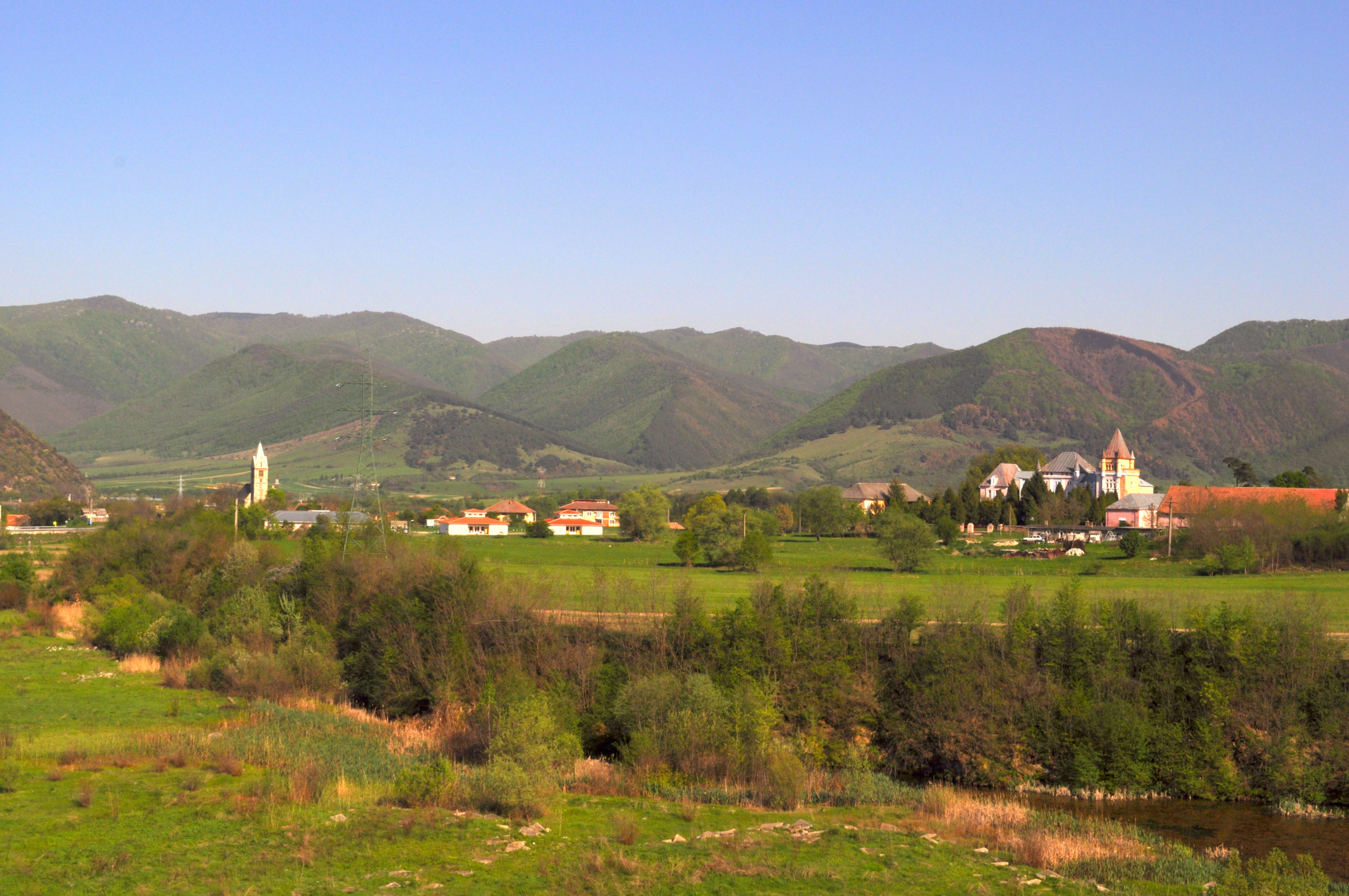
- Sântămăria-Orlea

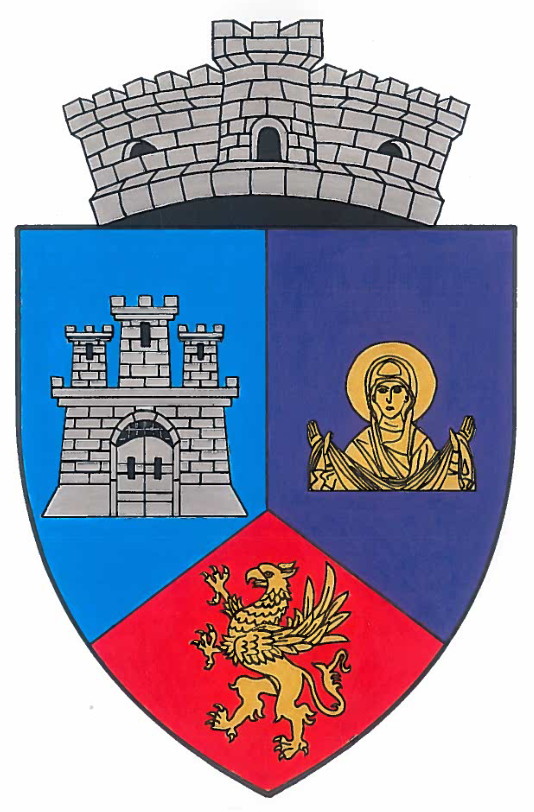
- Coat of arms

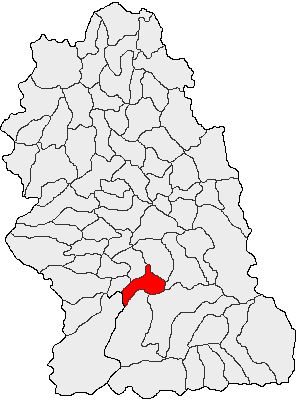
- Location in Hunedoara County

- Location in Romania
- Coordinates: 45.5906°N 22.9706°E
- Country: Romania
- County: Hunedoara

Government
  - Mayor (2024–2028): Dumitru-Ioan Oprean (PSD)
- Area: 67.80 km^{2} (26.18 sq mi)
- Elevation: 310 m (1,020 ft)
- Population (2021-12-01): 3,132
  - Density: 46.19/km^{2} (119.6/sq mi)
- Time zone: UTC+02:00 (EET)
  - Summer (DST): UTC+03:00 (EEST)
- Postal code: 337440
- Area code: (+40) 02 54
- Vehicle reg.: HD
- Website: www.santamariaorlea.ro

Sântămăria-Orlea (Hungarian: Őraljaboldogfalva, German: Liebfrauen) is a commune in Hunedoara County, Transylvania, Romania. It is composed of nine villages: Balomir (Balomir), Bărăștii Hațegului (Baresd), Bucium-Orlea (Bucsum), Ciopeia (Csopea), Săcel (Szacsal), Sânpetru (Szentpéterfalva), Sântămăria-Orlea, Subcetate (Hátszegváralja), and Vadu (Vád).

The commune lies in a hilly area, north of the Retezat Mountains, on the banks of the river Strei and its tributary, Râul Mare, as well as the latter's tributaries, Râul Galben and Sibișel.

Sântămăria-Orlea is located in the southern part of Hunedoara County, 40 km (25 mi) south of the county seat, Deva. It is situated in the historical and ethnographical area known as Țara Hațegului, 3 km (1.9 mi) southeast of its hub, the town of Hațeg. The commune is crossed by national road DN66, part of European route E79.

The Kendeffy Castle in Sântămăria-Orlea dates back to 1792; it has been transformed into a hotel in 1982.

== Fossils and geology ==
This community is notable as the place where, in the late 19th century, Ilona von Felsö-Szilvás discovered fossilized dinosaur bones that had become exposed in a hillside on her the family’s estate near Sânpetru (called then Szentpéterfalva). At that time, the village was situated in Hunyad County within the county of borders of the Kingdom of Hungary, part of Austro-Hungarian Empire.

Ilona and her brother, Baron Franz Nopcsa von Felsö-Szilvás, were intrigued by the discovery. The bones were sent to the eminent Viennese geologist Eduard Suess for identification. Suess advised the Baron to identify the bones himself; consequently, the Baron enrolled at the University of Vienna and soon became one of the principal paleobiological researchers in central Europe, and the founder of paleophysiology.

Ilona's initial discovery turned out to be a duck-billed dinosaur. Subsequently, the remains of an armoured dinosaur, a long-necked sauropod, a flying reptile (pterosaur), and several other dinosaurs were excavated from that same hill in Sânpetru.

Geologically, Nopcsa's dinosaur fossils came from what was then called the Sânpetru Beds but are now called the Sânpetru Formation.

Historical population
Year	Pop.	±%
1850	2,383	—
1992	3,996	+67.7%
2002	3,522	−11.9%
2011	3,251	−7.7%
2021	3,132	−3.7%
Source: INS, Census data
