= Râul Șes =

Râul Șes may refer to:

- Șes (Râul Mare), a tributary of the Râul Mare in Caraș-Severin and Hunedoara Counties
- Șes, a tributary of the Bistrița in Maramureș County
