= Măguri =

Măguri may refer to:

- Măguri, a village in Măguri-Răcătău Commune, Cluj County, Romania
- Măguri, a district in the city of Lugoj, Timiș County, Romania
