= Breazova (Râul Galben) =

River in Romania

- Location within Romania

Location
- Country: Romania
- Counties: Hunedoara County
- Villages: Sarmizegetusa, Breazova, Peșteana, Hățăgel

Physical characteristics
- Source: Poiana Ruscă Mountains
- Mouth: Râul Galben
  - coordinates: 45.5920°N 22.8401°E
- Length: 29 km (18 mi)
- Basin size: 113 km^{2} (44 sq mi)

Basin features
- Progression: Râul Galben→ Râul Mare→ Strei→ Mureș→ Tisza→ Danube→ Black Sea
- Tributaries
  - left: Valea Răchițelii Peșteana
  - right: Zeicani, Zlatina, Râușor, Odorojnița

The Breazova is a right tributary of the Râul Galben in Romania. It flows into the Râul Galben near Tuștea. Its length is 29 km (18 mi) and its basin size is 113 km^{2} (44 sq mi).
