= Pietrele River =

Pietrele River may refer to:

- Pietrele, a tributary of the Vâja in Gorj County
- Pietrele, a tributary of the Sibișel in Hunedoara County
