= Zănoguța River =

Zănoguța River may refer to:

- Zănoguța, a tributary of the Judele in Hunedoara County, Romania
- Zănoguța, a tributary of the Latorița in Vâlcea County, Romania
- Zănoguța, a tributary of the Vâlsan in Argeș County, Romania
