= Valea Pietrei =

Valea Pietrei may refer to the following places in Romania:

- Valea Pietrei, a village in the commune Urlați, Prahova County
- Valea Pietrei, a tributary of the Lotru in Vâlcea County
- Valea Pietrei (Râul Mare), a river in Hunedoara County
- Valea Pietrei, a tributary of the Vărbilău in Prahova County
- Valea Pietrei Mari, a tributary of the Timiș in Brașov County
