= Nedeuța River =

Nedeuța River may refer to:

- Nedeuța, a tributary of the Cheagu in Hunedoara County
- Nedeuța, a tributary of the Valea Boului in Hunedoara County
