= Paclisa =

Paclisa may refer to:

- Pâclișa, a village administered by Alba Iulia, Alba County, Romania
- Păclișa, a village in Totești Commune, Hunedoara County, Romania
- Pâclișa River, a tributary of the Mureș River in Romania
