= Boica =

Boica is the Hungarian name for two places in Romania:

- Băiţa Commune, Hunedoara County
- Boiţa village, Răchitova Commune, Hunedoara County
