= Râul Mare Hydroelectric Power Station =

Râul Mare
- Location within Romania
- Location: Râul Mare, Romania
- Coordinates: 45°20′20″N 22°43′17″E
- Type: reservoir
- Basin countries: Romania
- Surface area: 1 km^{2} (0.39 sq mi)
- Water volume: 200 million cubic metres (160,000 acre⋅ft)

Râul Mare Hydro Power Plant is a large power plant on the Râul Mare River, a river situated in Romania.

The hydropower plant was built in the 1980s. The Gura Apelor Dam was built to be used as a hydrodam.

The power plant generates 650 GWh of electricity per year.

== See also ==
- Porţile de Fier I
- Porţile de Fier II
