= Lăpușnicul Mic =

- Location within Romania

Location
- Country: Romania
- Counties: Hunedoara

Physical characteristics
- Mouth: Râul Mare
  - location: Gura Apelor reservoir
  - coordinates: 45.322°N 22.725°E
- Length: 8 km (5.0 mi)
- Basin size: 30 km^{2} (12 sq mi)

Basin features
- Progression: Râul Mare→ Strei→ Mureș→ Tisza→ Danube→ Black Sea
- Tributaries
  - right: Borăscu

The Lăpușnicul Mic (also: Lăpușnic) is a left tributary of the river Râul Mare in Romania. It discharges into the Gura Apelor reservoir. Its length is 8 km (5.0 mi) and its basin size is 30 km^{2} (12 sq mi).
