= Valea Pietrei (Râul Mare) =

River in Romania

Valea Pietrei Netiș
- Location within Romania

Location
- Country: Romania
- Counties: Hunedoara County

Physical characteristics
- Mouth: Râul Mare
  - coordinates: 45.3664°N 22.7474°E
- Length: 8 km (5.0 mi)
- Basin size: 18 km^{2} (6.9 sq mi)

Basin features
- Progression: Râul Mare→ Strei→ Mureș→ Tisza→ Danube→ Black Sea

The Valea Pietrei or Netiș is a left tributary of the Râul Mare in Romania. It flows into the Râul Mare downstream from the Gura Apelor Dam. Its length is 8 km (5.0 mi) and its basin size is 18 km^{2} (6.9 sq mi).
