= Judele =

- Location within Romania

Location
- Country: Romania
- Counties: Hunedoara County

Physical characteristics
- Source: Retezat Mountains
- Mouth: Râul Mare
  - coordinates: 45.3081°N 22.7977°E
- Length: 6 km (3.7 mi)
- Basin size: 19 km^{2} (7.3 sq mi)

Basin features
- Progression: Râul Mare→ Strei→ Mureș→ Tisza→ Danube→ Black Sea
- Tributaries
  - right: Zănoaga, Zănoguța

The Judele is a right tributary of the river Râul Mare in Romania. It flows into the Râul Mare upstream from the Gura Apelor Dam. Its length is 6 km (3.7 mi) and its basin size is 19 km^{2} (7.3 sq mi).
