= Someșul Rece =

Right headwater of the river Someșul Mic in Romania

- Location within Romania

Location
- Country: Romania
- Counties: Cluj County
- Villages: Măguri-Răcătău

Physical characteristics
- Mouth: Someșul Mic
  - location: Gilău
  - coordinates: 46°44′08″N 23°21′27″E
- Length: 49 km (30 mi)
- Basin size: 330 km^{2} (130 sq mi)

Basin features
- Progression: Someșul Mic→ Someș→ Tisza→ Danube→ Black Sea
- Tributaries
  - left: Răcătău
  - right: Irișoara, Dumitreasa, Râșca Mare

The Someșul Rece (Hungarian: Hideg-Szamos; literally "Cold Someș") is the right headwater of the river Someșul Mic in Romania. It joins the Someșul Cald (Warm Someș) in Lake Gilău, a reservoir near Gilău. Its length is 49 km (30 mi) and its basin size is 330 km^{2} (130 sq mi).
