= Zlata (Râul Mare) =

- Location within Romania

Location
- Country: Romania
- Counties: Hunedoara County

Physical characteristics
- Source: Retezat Mountains
- Mouth: Râul Mare
  - coordinates: 45.3904°N 22.7695°E
- Length: 8 km (5.0 mi)
- Basin size: 27 km^{2} (10 sq mi)

Basin features
- Progression: Râul Mare→ Strei→ Mureș→ Tisza→ Danube→ Black Sea
- Tributaries
  - left: Cârligu
  - right: Lăncița

The Zlata (in its upper course: Dobrun) is a right tributary of the Râul Mare in Romania. Its source is in the Retezat Mountains. Its length is 8 km (5.0 mi) and its basin size is 27 km^{2} (10 sq mi).
