= Râul Galben =

Râul Galben Densuș
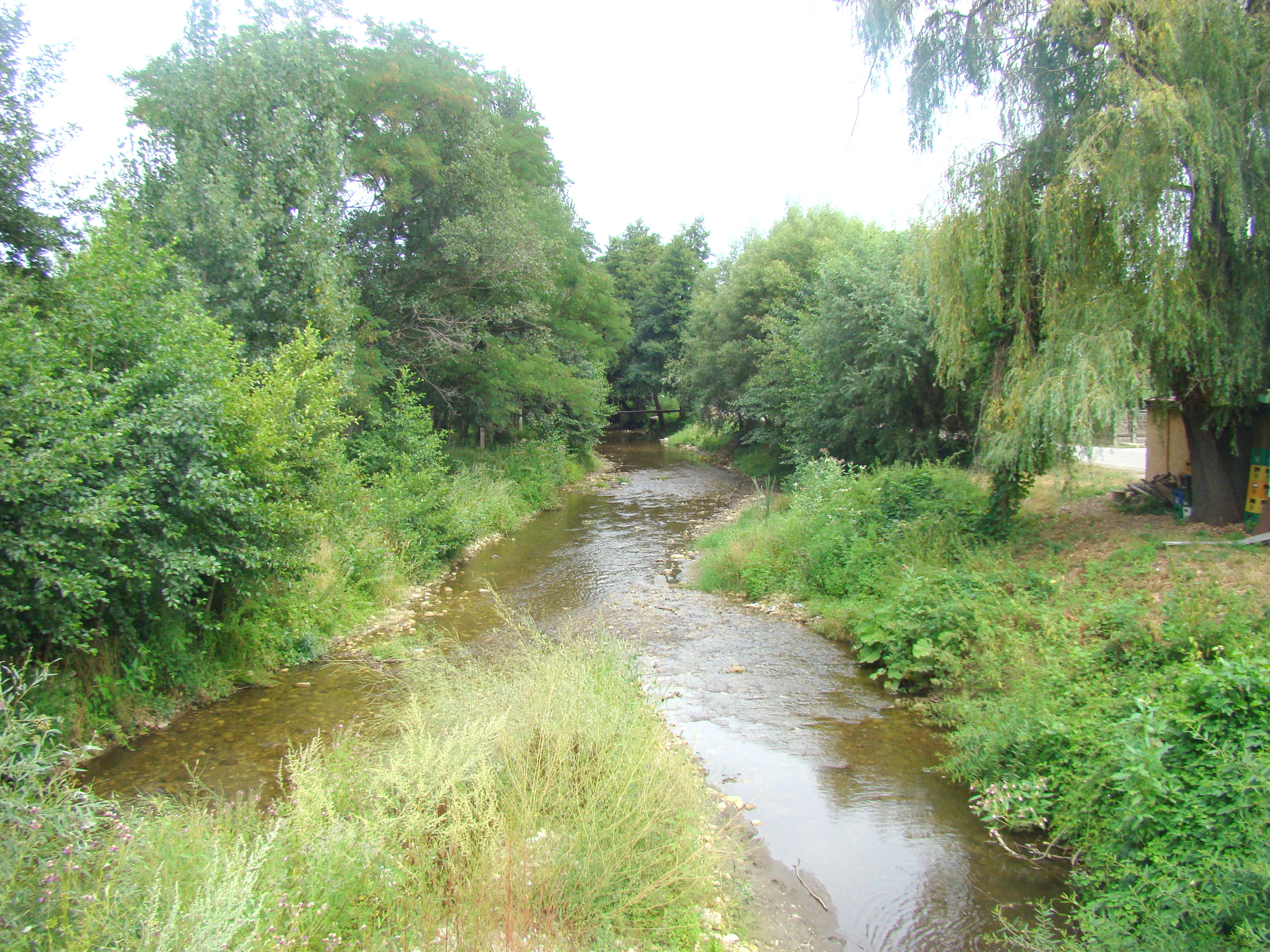

- Location within Romania

Location
- Country: Romania
- Counties: Hunedoara County
- Villages: Ștei, Densuș, General Berthelot, Hațeg

Physical characteristics
- Source: Poiana Ruscă Mountains
- Mouth: Râul Mare
  - location: Sântămăria-Orlea
  - coordinates: 45.5944°N 22.9810°E
- Length: 34 km (21 mi)
- Basin size: 357 km^{2} (138 sq mi)

Basin features
- Progression: Râul Mare→ Strei→ Mureș→ Tisza→ Danube→ Black Sea
- Tributaries
  - left: Răchitova
  - right: Dunăreana, Poieni, Breazova, Pârâul de Câmp

The Râul Galben is a left tributary of the Râul Mare in Romania. It discharges into the Râul Mare in Sântămăria-Orlea. Upstream of the confluence with the Răchitova, the river is also known as Densuș. The river flows through the town Hațeg. Its length is 34 km (21 mi) and its basin size is 357 km^{2} (138 sq mi).
