= Râșca Mare =

- Location within Romania

Location
- Country: Romania
- Counties: Cluj County

Physical characteristics
- Mouth: Someșul Rece
  - coordinates: 46.6913°N 23.3061°E
- Length: 12 km (7.5 mi)
- Basin size: 18 km^{2} (6.9 sq mi)

Basin features
- Progression: Someșul Rece→ Someșul Mic→ Someș→ Tisza→ Danube→ Black Sea

The Râșca Mare is a right tributary of the river Someșul Rece in Romania. It discharges into the Someșul Rece downstream from the Cheile de la Arsuri, near Gilău. Its length is 12 km (7.5 mi) and its basin size is 18 km^{2} (6.9 sq mi).
