= Ruja (Siret) =

- Location within Romania

Location
- Country: Romania
- Counties: Iași County
- Villages: Valea Seacă, Lunca

Physical characteristics
- Mouth: Siret
  - location: Lunca
  - coordinates: 47.2750°N 26.7574°E
- Length: 12 km (7.5 mi)
- Basin size: 66 km^{2} (25 sq mi)

Basin features
- Progression: Siret→ Danube→ Black Sea
- Tributaries
  - right: Irmolea, Gâștești
- River code: XII.1.26a

The Ruja is a right tributary of the river Siret in Romania. It flows into the Siret north of Pașcani. Its length is 12 km (7.5 mi) and its basin size 66 km^{2} (25 sq mi).
