= Rât (Mureș) =

Rât Háporton-patak
- Location within Romania

Location
- Country: Romania
- Counties: Alba County
- Villages: Hopârta, Lopadea Nouă, Ciumbrud

Physical characteristics
- Mouth: Mureș
  - location: Ciumbrud
  - coordinates: 46.3010°N 23.7570°E
- Length: 15 km (9.3 mi)
- Basin size: 76 km^{2} (29 sq mi)

Basin features
- Progression: Mureș→ Tisza→ Danube→ Black Sea
- Tributaries
  - left: Odverem

The Rât (Hungarian: Háporton-patak) is a left tributary of the river Mureș in Transylvania, Romania. It discharges into the Mureș in Ciumbrud. Its length is 15 km (9.3 mi) and its basin size is 76 km^{2} (29 sq mi).
