= Șes (Râul Mare) =

- Location within Romania

Location
- Country: Romania
- Counties: Caraș-Severin, Hunedoara

Physical characteristics
- Source: Țarcu Mountains
- Mouth: Râul Mare
  - location: Gura Apelor reservoir
  - coordinates: 45.333°N 22.716°E
- Length: 23 km (14 mi)
- Basin size: 75 km^{2} (29 sq mi)

Basin features
- Progression: Râul Mare→ Strei→ Mureș→ Tisza→ Danube→ Black Sea

The Șes is a left tributary of the river Râul Mare in Romania. It discharges into the Gura Apelor reservoir, which is drained by the Râul Mare. Its length is 23 km (14 mi) and its basin size is 75 km^{2} (29 sq mi).

== Tributaries ==
The following rivers are tributaries to the river Șes:

- Left: Șcheiu, Mătania, Baicu, Zeicu
- Right: Pârâul Morii, Gugu, Mierla
