= Râușor (Strei) =

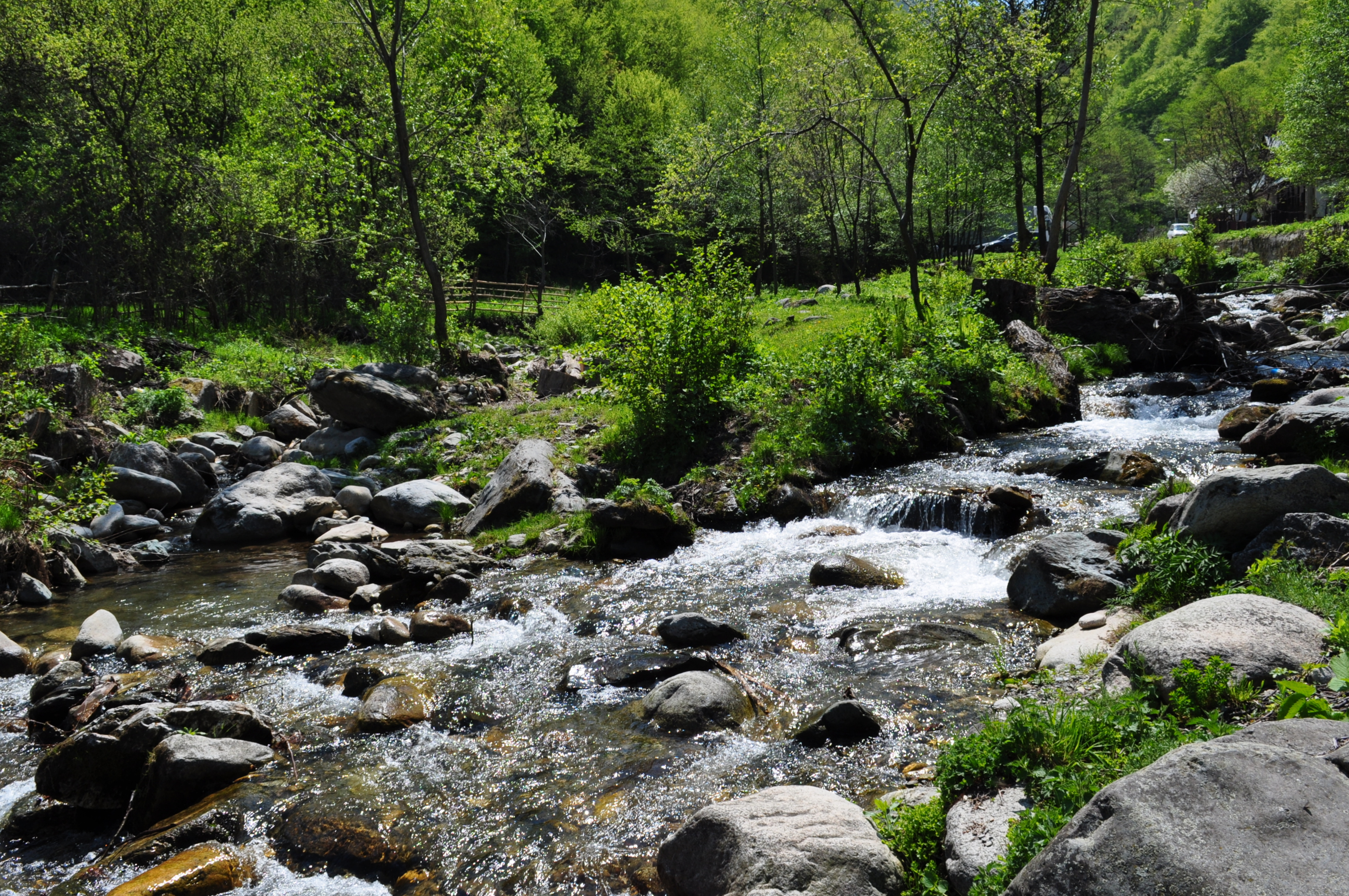

- Location within Romania

Location
- Country: Romania
- Counties: Hunedoara County

Physical characteristics
- Source: Retezat Mountains
- Mouth: Râul Mare
  - location: Ostrovel
  - coordinates: 45.5013°N 22.8456°E
- Length: 16 km (9.9 mi)
- Basin size: 37 km^{2} (14 sq mi)

Basin features
- Progression: Râul Mare→ Strei→ Mureș→ Tisza→ Danube→ Black Sea

The Râușor is a right tributary of the Râul Mare in Romania. It discharges into the Râul Mare in Ostrovel. Its length is 16 km (9.9 mi) and its basin size is 37 km^{2} (14 sq mi).

== Tributaries ==
The following rivers are tributaries to the river Râușor:

- Left: Vălereasca, Valea Cernei
- Right: Ștevia, Izvorul cu Apă, Strugariu, Negrele, Frăsina
