= Sibișel (Strei) =

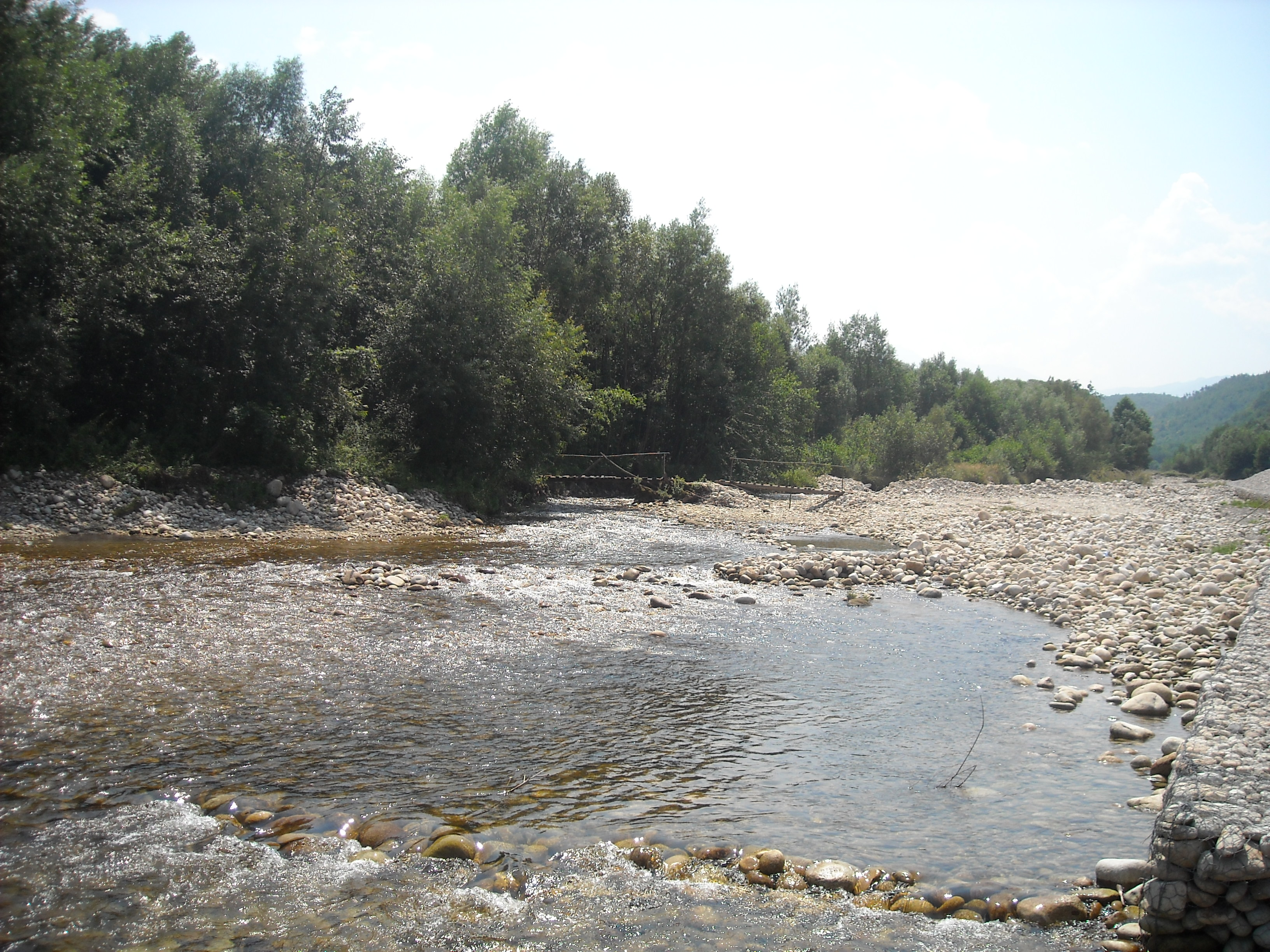
- The Sibișel near the Sânpetru Mesozoic Formation

- Location within Romania

Location
- Country: Romania
- Counties: Hunedoara County
- Villages: Nucșoara, Sibișel, Săcel, Bărăștii Hațegului, Sântămăria-Orlea

Physical characteristics
- Source: confluence of headwaters Stânișoara and Pietrele
  - location: Retezat Mountains
- Mouth: Râul Mare
  - location: Sântămăria-Orlea
  - coordinates: 45.5915°N 22.9832°E
- Length: 29 km (18 mi)
- Basin size: 76 km^{2} (29 sq mi)

Basin features
- Progression: Râul Mare→ Strei→ Mureș→ Tisza→ Danube→ Black Sea
- Tributaries
  - left: Stânișoara, Pârâul lui Adam, Fântânele, Varu
  - right: Pietrele, Valea Rea, Cheagu, Clanțu, Seciu

The Sibișel is a right tributary of the Râul Mare in Romania. It discharges into the Râul Mare in Sântămăria-Orlea. It starts at the confluence of headwaters Stânișoara and Pietrele in the Retezat Mountains. Its length is 29 km (18 mi) and its basin size is 76 km^{2} (29 sq mi).

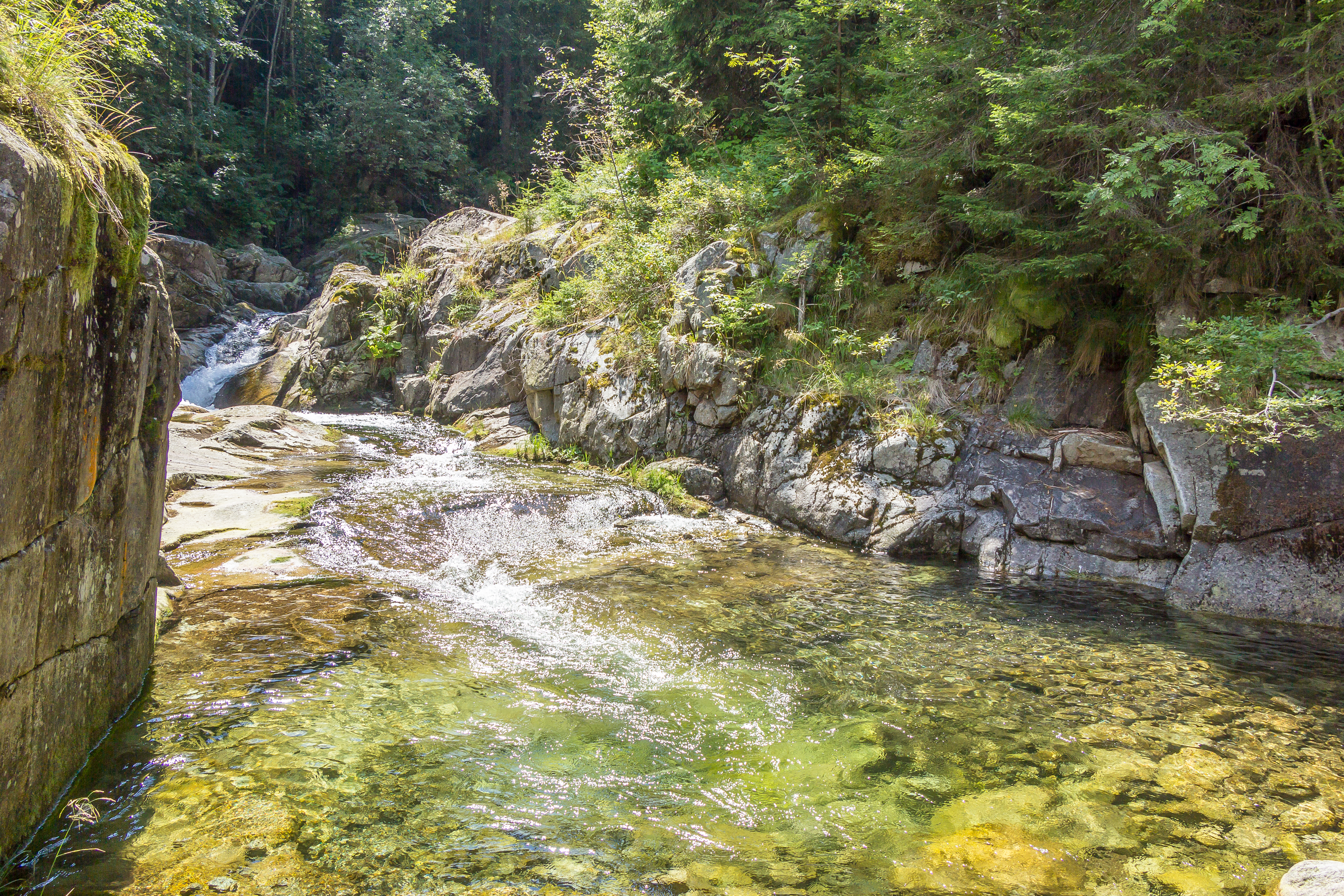
The Sibișel near the Lolaia waterfall
