= Măguri-Răcătău =

- Commune
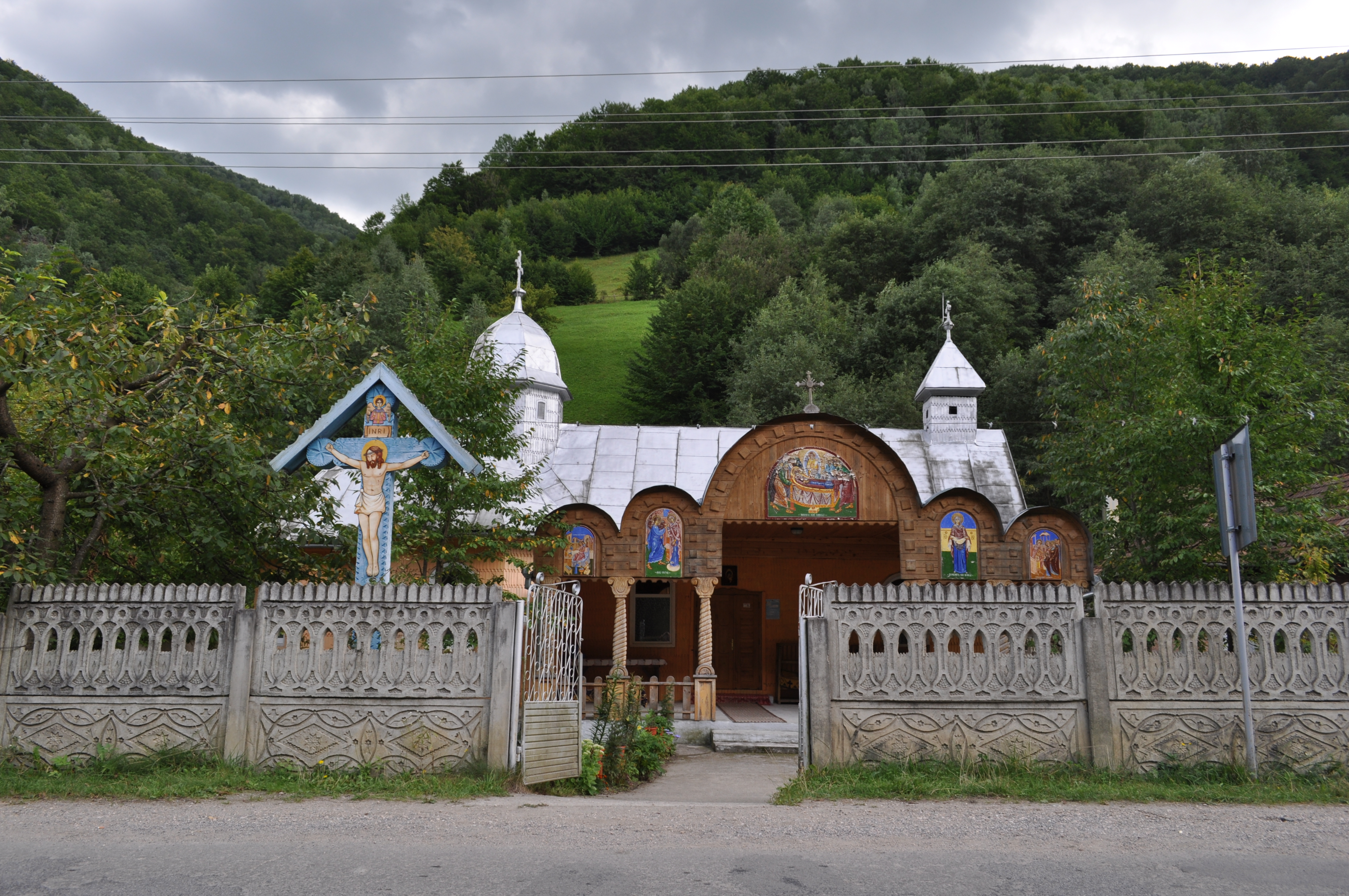
- Wooden church in Măguri-Răcătău

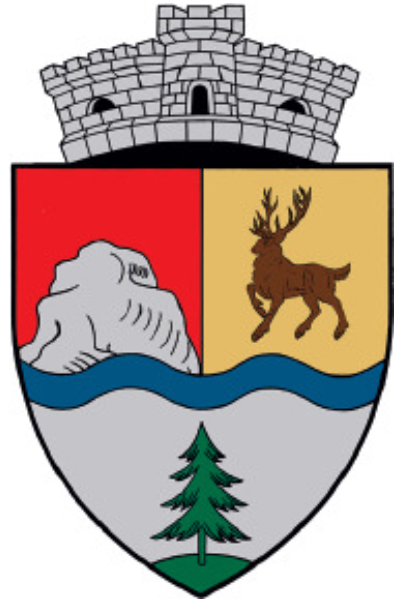
- Coat of arms

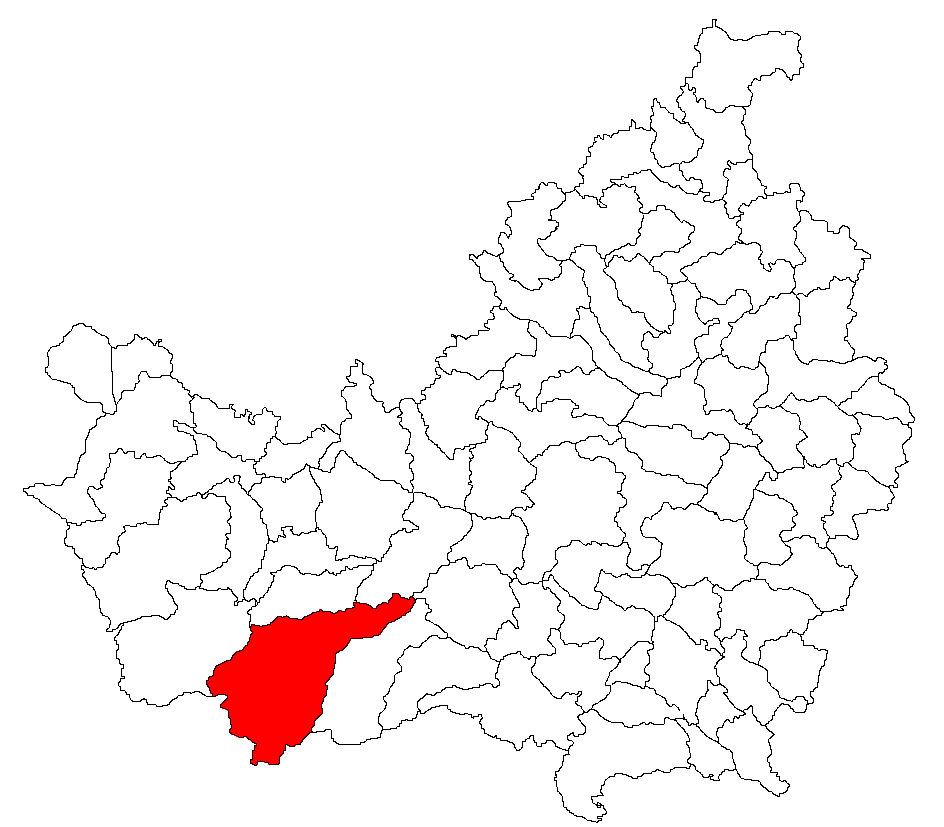
- Location in Cluj County

- Location in Romania
- Coordinates: 46°38′34″N 23°11′46″E
- Country: Romania
- County: Cluj
- Subdivisions: Măguri, Măguri-Răcătău, Muntele Rece

Government
  - Mayor (2020–2024): Alexandru Livescu (PSD)
- Area: 268.95 km^{2} (103.84 sq mi)
- Elevation: 682 m (2,238 ft)
- Population (2021-12-01): 2,077
  - Density: 7.723/km^{2} (20.00/sq mi)
- Time zone: UTC+02:00 (EET)
  - Summer (DST): UTC+03:00 (EEST)
- Postal code: 407365
- Area code: (+40) 0264
- Vehicle reg.: CJ
- Website: comunamaguriracatau.ro

Măguri-Răcătău (Hungarian: Reketó; German: Rekettau) is a commune in Cluj County, Transylvania, Romania. It is composed of three villages: Măguri (Szamosfő), Măguri-Răcătău, and Muntele Rece (Hideghavas).

== Geography ==
The commune is situated in the northern reaches of the Apuseni Mountains, at an altitude of 682 m (2,238 ft). It lies on the banks of the river Someșul Rece and its left tributary, the Răcătău. It is located in the southwestern part of Cluj County, 42 km (26 mi) from the county seat, Cluj-Napoca, on the border with Alba County.

== Demographics ==
Historical population
Year	Pop.	±%
1850	910	—
1880	2,001	+119.9%
1890	2,115	+5.7%
1900	2,135	+0.9%
1910	2,603	+21.9%
1920	2,405	−7.6%
1930	2,683	+11.6%
1941	3,017	+12.4%
1956	3,412	+13.1%
1966	4,074	+19.4%
1977	3,406	−16.4%
1992	2,567	−24.6%
2002	2,411	−6.1%
2011	2,242	−7.0%
2021	2,077	−7.4%
Source: Census data

According to the census from 2002 there was a total population of 2,411 people living in this commune; of those, 99.83% were ethnic Romanians, 0.08% ethnic Hungarians, and 0.04% ethnic Germans. At the 2011 census, there were 2,242 inhabitants, of which 97.73% were Romanians, while at the 2021 census, the population had decreased to 2,077, with 91.09% Romanians.
