= Răcătău (Someș) =

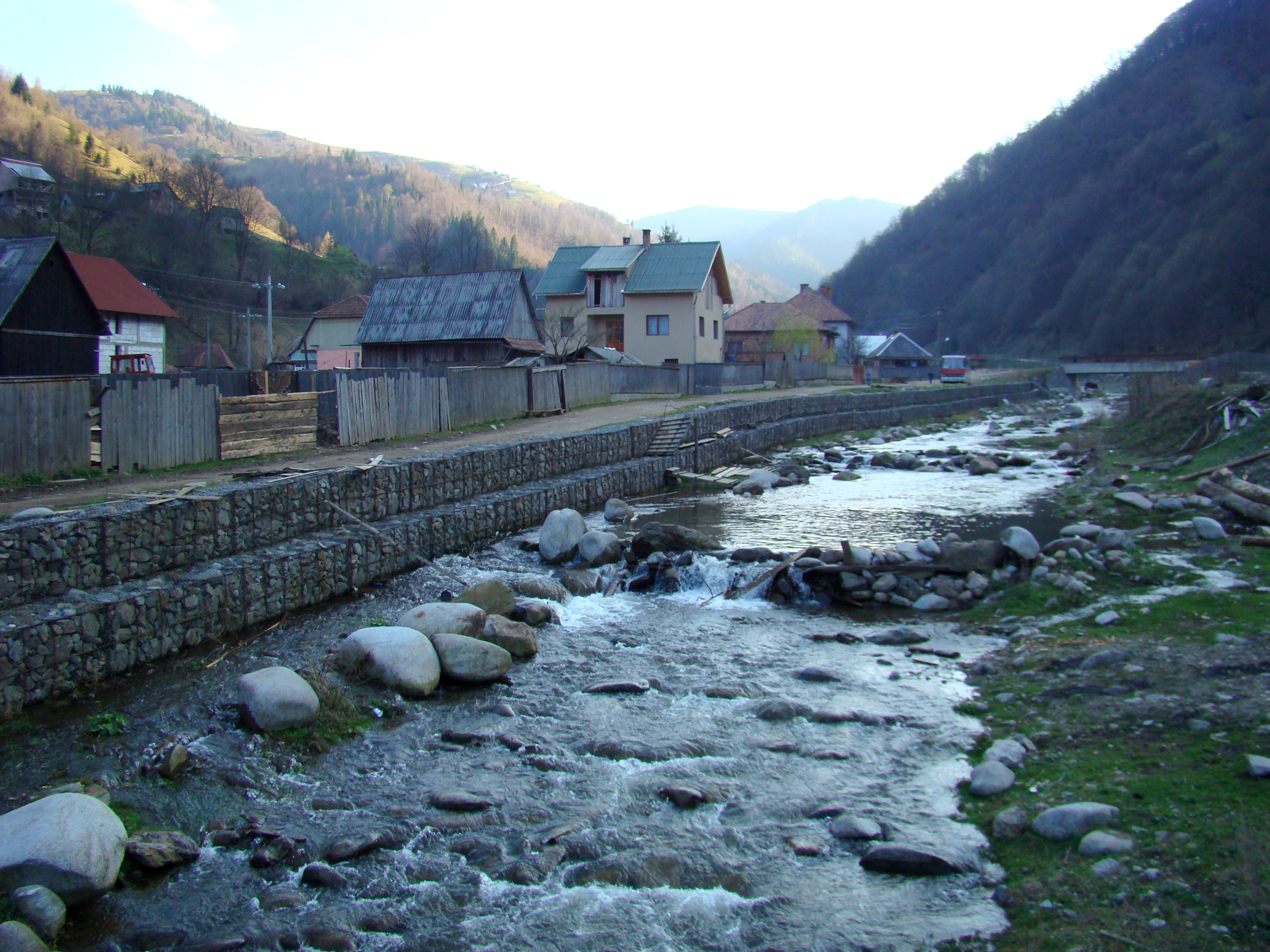

- Location within Romania

Location
- Country: Romania
- Counties: Cluj County

Physical characteristics
- Mouth: Someșul Rece
  - location: Măguri-Răcătău
  - coordinates: 46.6506°N 23.1983°E
- Length: 29 km (18 mi)
- Basin size: 101 km^{2} (39 sq mi)

Basin features
- Progression: Someșul Rece→ Someșul Mic→ Someș→ Tisza→ Danube→ Black Sea
- Tributaries
  - left: Dobruș

The Răcătău is a left tributary of the river Someșul Rece in Romania. It flows into the Someșul Rece at Măguri-Răcătău. With a length of 29 km (18 mi), its basin size is 101 km² (39 sq mi).
