= Răcătău (Siret) =

- Location within Romania

Location
- Country: Romania
- Counties: Bacău County

Physical characteristics
- Mouth: Siret
  - coordinates: 46.3666°N 27.0343°E
- Length: 28 km (17 mi)
- Basin size: 181 km^{2} (70 sq mi)

Basin features
- Progression: Siret→ Danube→ Black Sea
- Tributaries
  - left: Zlătari, Parincea, Nănești
  - right: Răchițaua

The Răcătău is a left tributary of the river Siret in Romania. It discharges into the Siret at Răcătău de Jos. The river basin size of the 28 km (17 mi) long Răcătău is 181 km^{2} (70 sq mi).
