= Gura Apelor Dam =

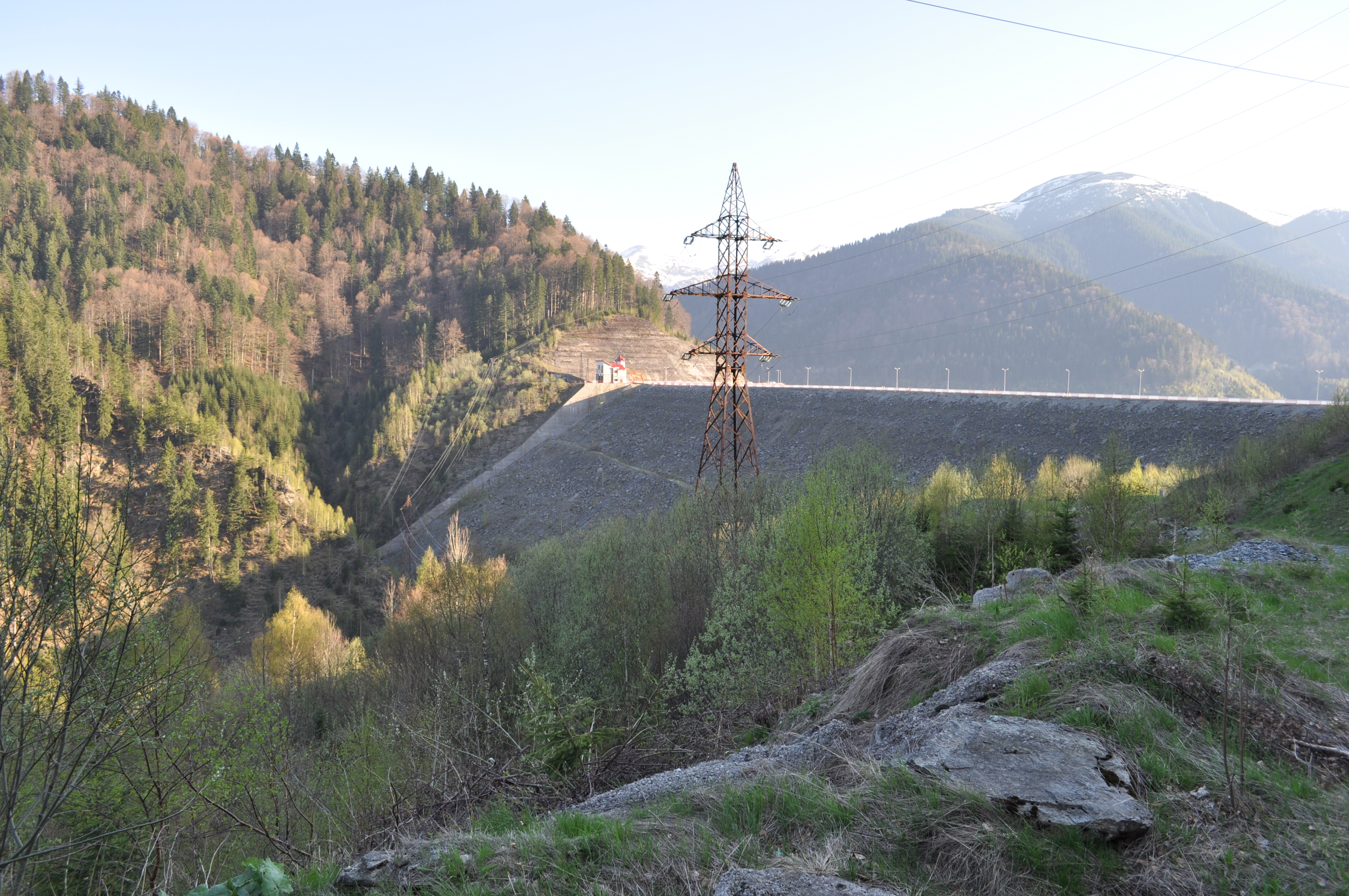
- Downstream face of the dam

- Location within Romania
- Country: Romania
- Location: Hațeg, Hunedoara County
- Coordinates: 45°20′21.03″N 22°43′18.00″E
- Purpose: Power
- Status: Complete, under repair
- Construction began: 1975
- Opening date: 1986; 40 years ago
- Owner: S.C. Hidroelectrica S.A.

Dam and spillways
- Type of dam: Embankment, rock-fill
- Impounds: Râul Mare
- Height: 168 m (551 ft)
- Length: 464 m (1,522 ft)
- Width (crest): 12 m (39 ft)
- Width (base): 574 m (1,883 ft)
- Dam volume: 10,285,000 m^{3} (13,452,000 cu yd)

Reservoir
- Total capacity: 225,000,000 m^{3} (182,000 acre⋅ft)
- Catchment area: 235 km^{2} (91 mi^{2})
- Maximum water depth: 162 m (531 ft)

Râul Mare Hydroelectric Power Station
- Coordinates: 45°28′43.63″N 22°49′26.33″E
- Commission date: 1986
- Hydraulic head: 582.5 m (1,911 ft)
- Turbines: 2 x 167.5 MW
- Installed capacity: 335 MW

The Gura Apelor Dam is a rock-fill dam on the river Râul Mare about 35 km (22 mi) southwest of Hațeg in Hunedoara County, Romania. It is fed by the Râul Mare and its tributaries Lăpușnicul Mic and Șes. It is the tallest dam in Romania. The primary purpose of the dam is hydroelectric power generation and it supports the 335 MW Râul Mare Hydroelectric Power Station which is located underground about 18 km (11 mi) to the northeast. Water from the reservoir is piped the long distance from the dam to the power station. The difference in elevation between the reservoir and the power station downstream affords a hydraulic head of 582.5 m (1,911 ft). Construction on the dam began in 1975 and the power station was operational in 1986. In 2012 the dam's reservoir was drained for repairs. It is expected to be impounded again in 2014.
