= Totești =

- Commune
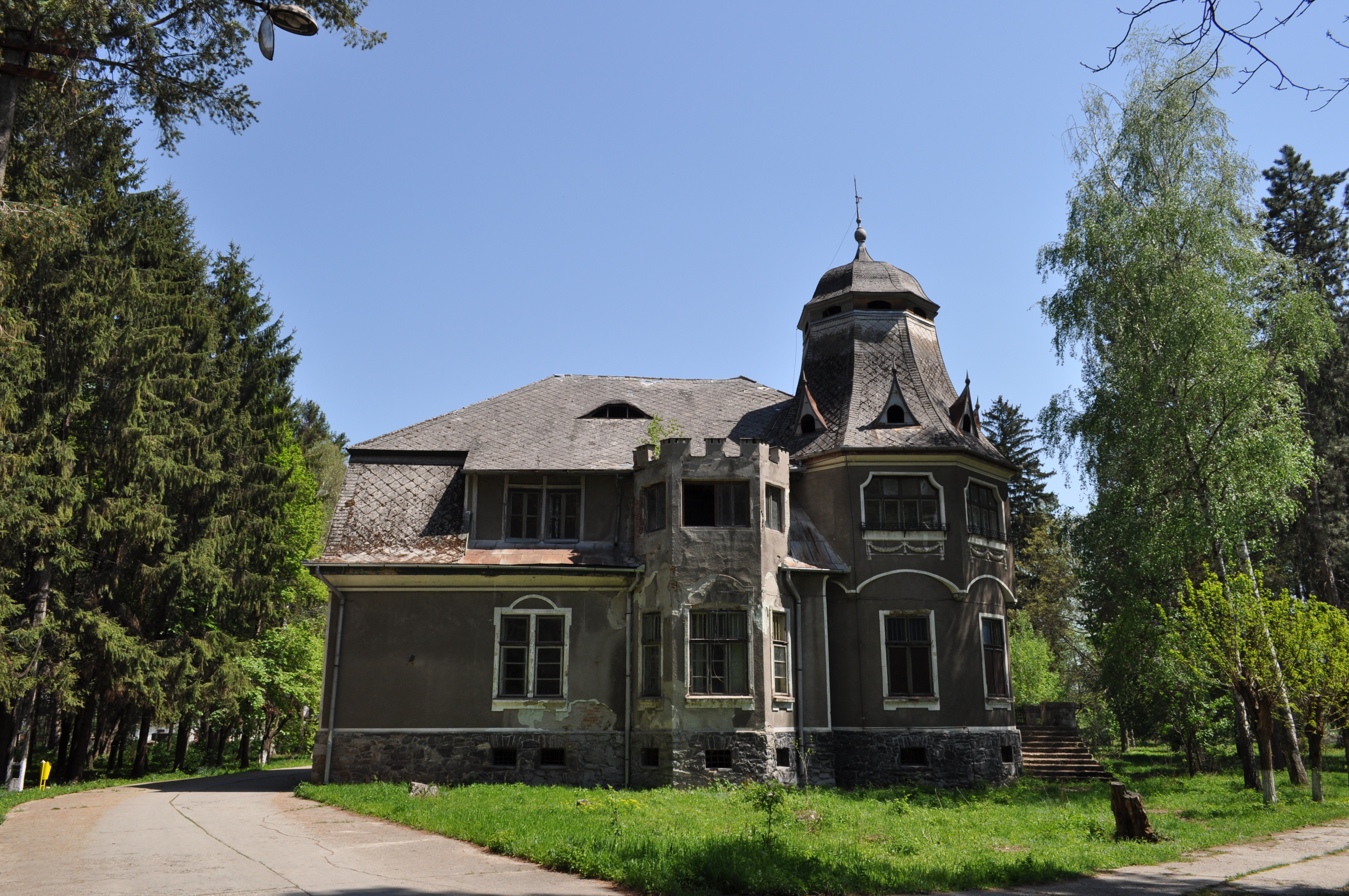
- Pogány Castle in Păclișa

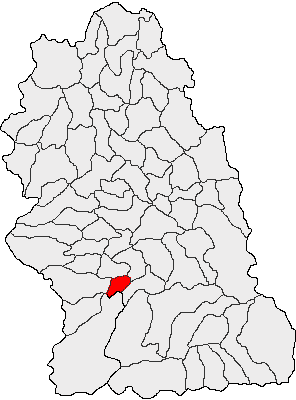
- Location in Hunedoara County

- Location in Romania
- Coordinates: 45.571°N 22.883°E
- Country: Romania
- County: Hunedoara

Government
  - Mayor (2024–2028): Tiberiu Păsconi (PSD)
- Area: 22.03 km^{2} (8.51 sq mi)
- Elevation: 378 m (1,240 ft)
- Population (2021-12-01): 1,649
  - Density: 74.85/km^{2} (193.9/sq mi)
- Time zone: UTC+02:00 (EET)
  - Summer (DST): UTC+03:00 (EEST)
- Postal code: 337490
- Area code: (+40) 02 54
- Vehicle reg.: HD
- Website: www.totesti.ro

Totești (Hungarian: Totesd) is a commune in Hunedoara County, Transylvania, Romania. It is composed of five villages: Cârnești, Copaci, Păclișa (Poklisa), Reea (Rea), and Totești.

Historical population
Year	Pop.	±%
1850	1,354	—
1956	2,548	+88.2%
2002	1,993	−21.8%
2011	1,893	−5.0%
2021	1,649	−12.9%
Source: Census data

== Gallery ==
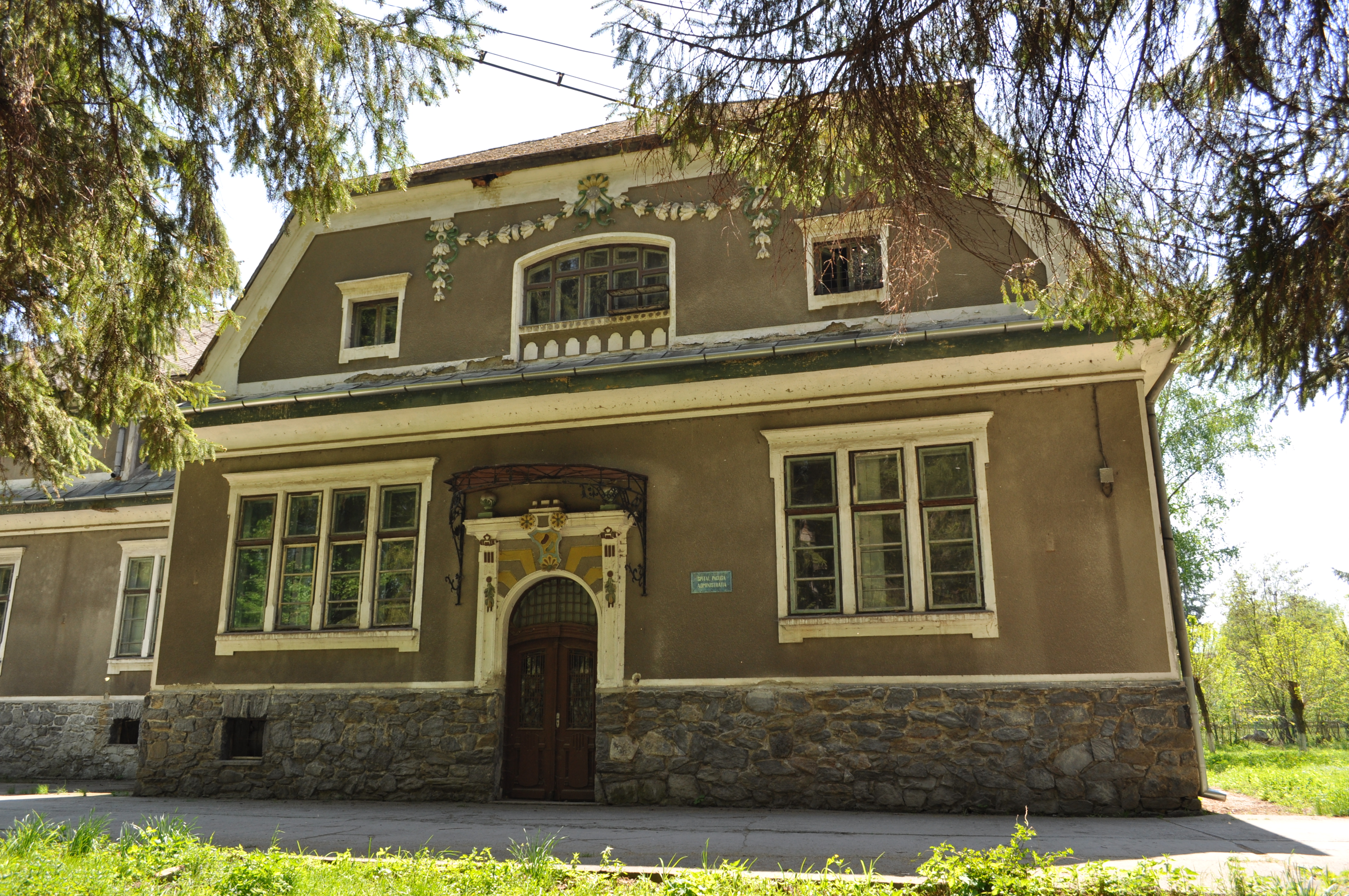
Pogány Castle in Păclișa

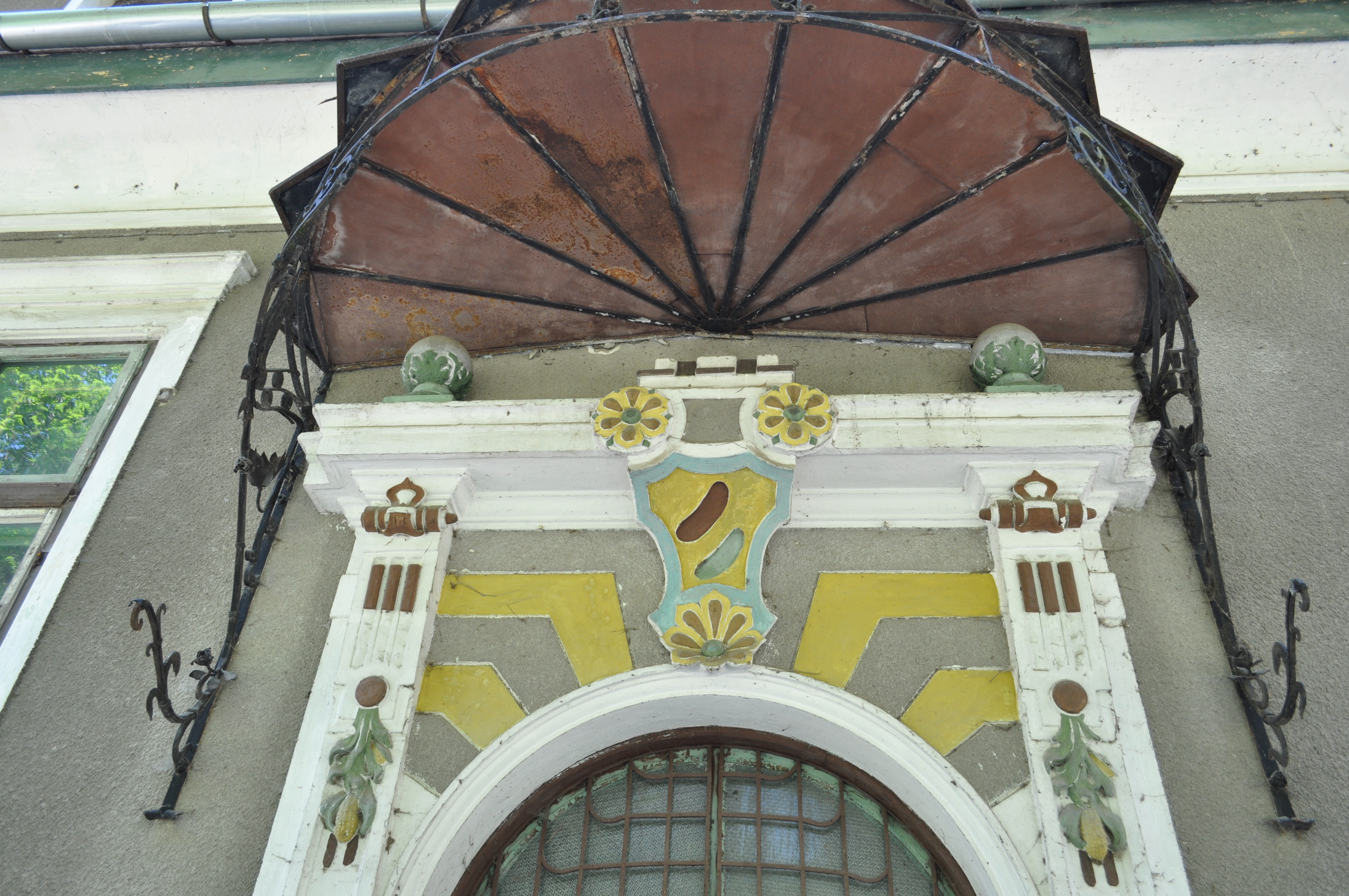
Pogány Castle in Păclișa

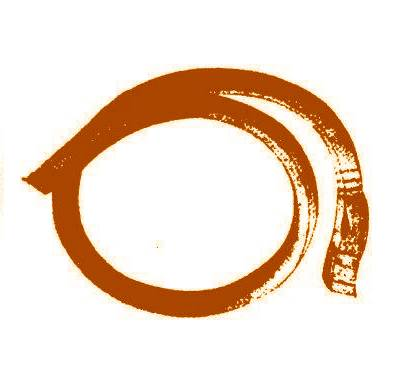
Gold snake-head Dacian bracelet found in Totești

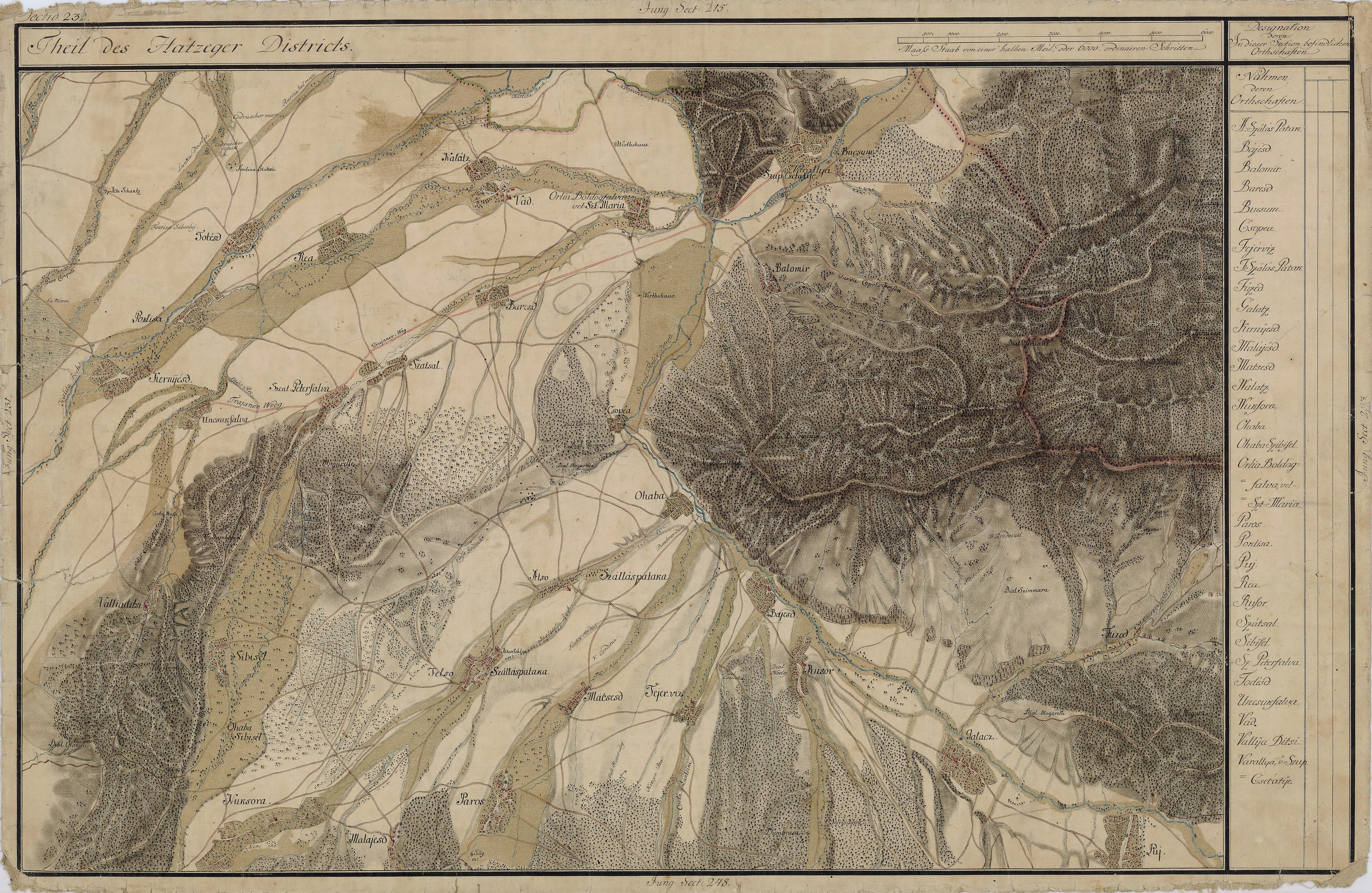
Totești in Grand Duchy of Transylvania, 1769–1773. Josephinische Landaufnahme p. 232

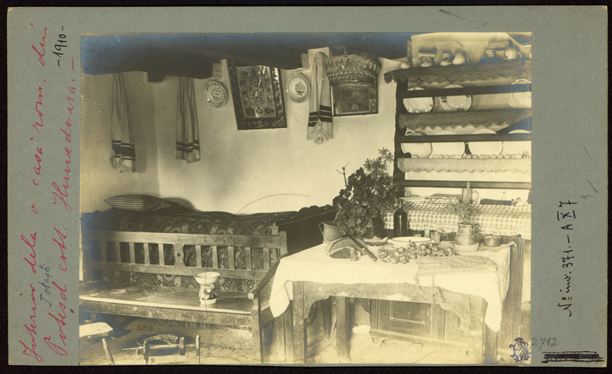
Romanian house interior in Totești (1900–1920)

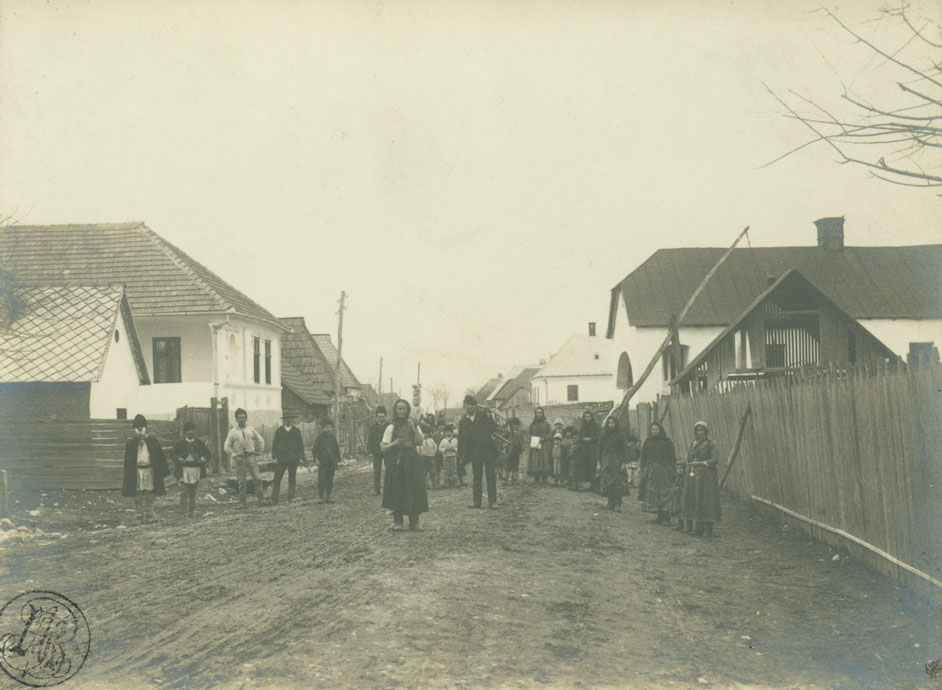
Main street in Totești (1900–1920)

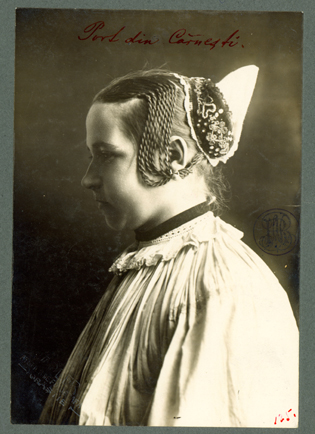
Women's costume from Cârnești (1900–1920)
