= Răchitova =

- Commune
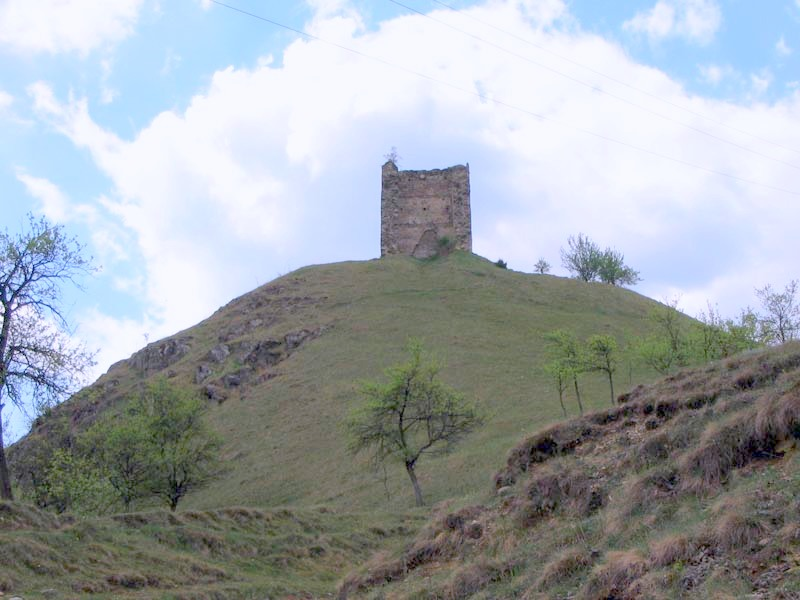
- Remains of a medieval dungeon in Răchitova

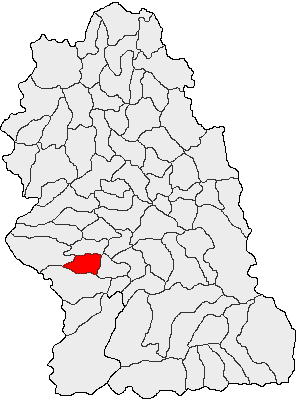
- Location in Hunedoara County

- Location in Romania
- Coordinates: 45°36′N 22°45′E
- Country: Romania
- County: Hunedoara

Government
  - Mayor (2020–2024): Liviu Simedroni (PSD)
- Area: 73.59 km^{2} (28.41 sq mi)
- Elevation: 490 m (1,610 ft)
- Population (2021-12-01): 1,127
  - Density: 15.31/km^{2} (39.66/sq mi)
- Time zone: UTC+02:00 (EET)
  - Summer (DST): UTC+03:00 (EEST)
- Postal code: 337370
- Area code: (+40) 02 54
- Vehicle reg.: HD
- Website: primariarachitova.ro

Răchitova (Hungarian: Reketyefalva, German: Weidendorf) is a commune in Hunedoara County, Transylvania, Romania. It is composed of seven villages: Boița (Boica), Ciula Mare (Nagycsula), Ciula Mică (Kiscsula), Gotești (Gotesdtanya), Mesteacăn (Meszkáton), Răchitova, and Vălioara (Valiora).

Historical population
Year	Pop.	±%
1850	2,135	—
1910	3,904	+82.9%
1966	2,885	−26.1%
2002	1,487	−48.5%
2011	1,330	−10.6%
2021	1,127	−15.3%
Source: Census data
