= Hațeg =

- Town
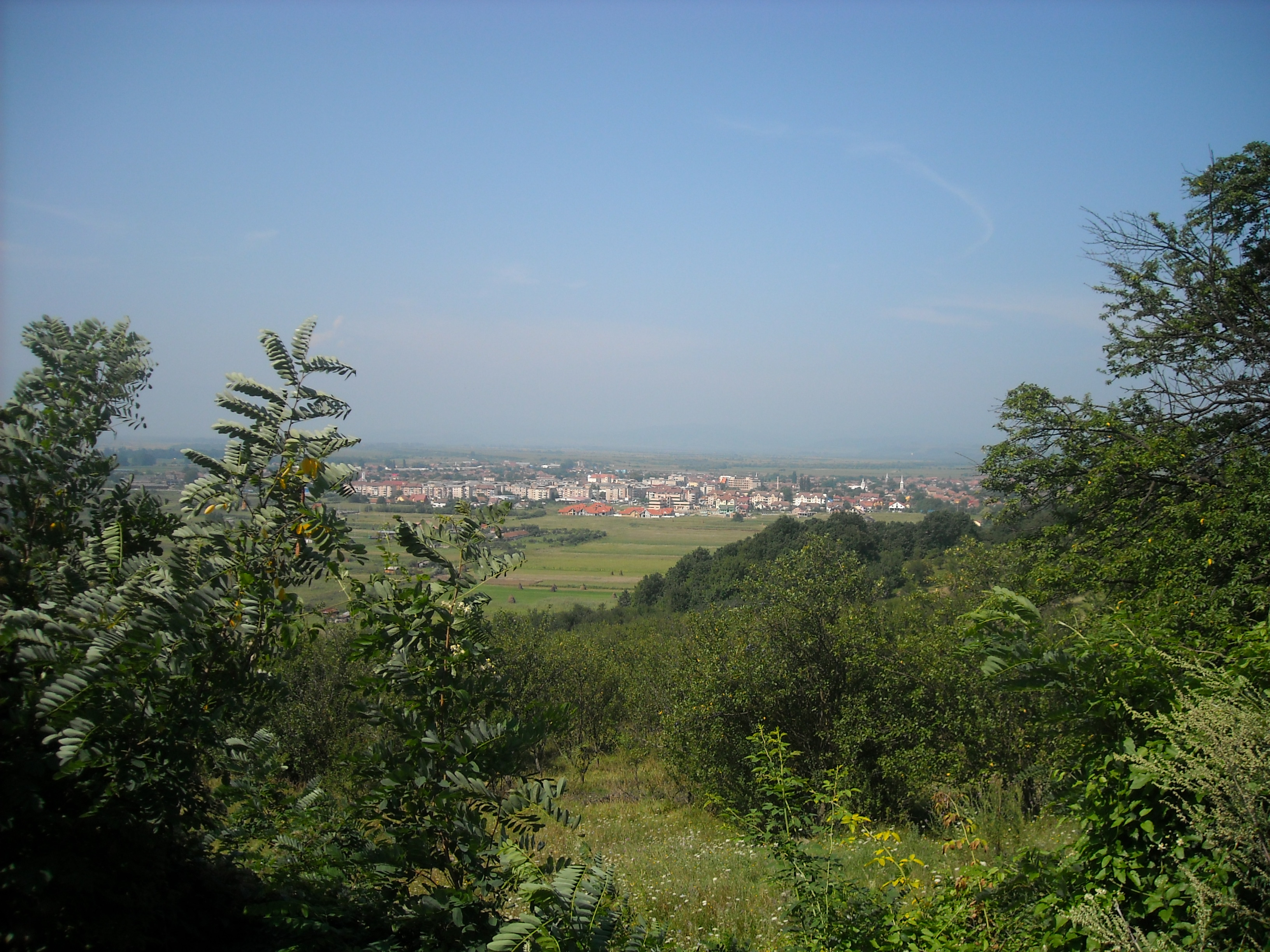
- Hațeg panorama

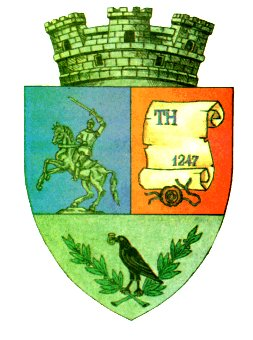
- Coat of arms

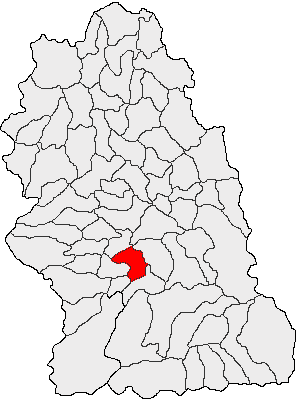
- Location in Hunedoara County

- Location in Romania
- Coordinates: 45°36′27″N 22°57′0″E
- Country: Romania
- County: Hunedoara

Government
  - Mayor (2024–2028): Adrian-Emilian Pușcaș (PNL)
- Area: 64.33 km^{2} (24.84 sq mi)
- Elevation: 315 m (1,033 ft)
- Population (2021-12-01): 8,793
  - Density: 136.7/km^{2} (354.0/sq mi)
- Time zone: UTC+02:00 (EET)
  - Summer (DST): UTC+03:00 (EEST)
- Postal code: 335500
- Area code: +(40) 0254
- Vehicle reg.: HD
- Website: primariehateg.ro

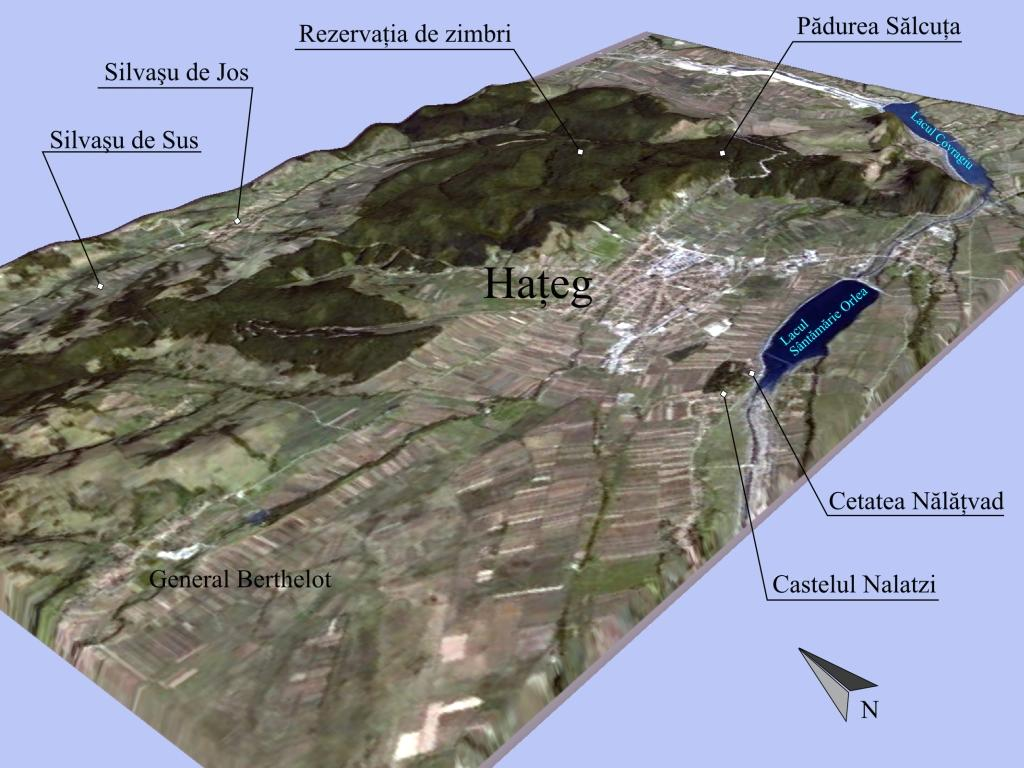

Hațeg (Romanian: [ˈhatseɡ]; German: Wallenthal; Hungarian: Hátszeg) is a town in Hunedoara County, Romania with a population of 8,793 as of 2021. Three villages are administered by the town: Nălațvad (Nalácvád), Silvașu de Jos (Alsószilvás), and Silvașu de Sus (Felsőszilvás). It is situated in the southwestern reaches of the historical region of Transylvania.

The town is the center of the ethnocultural and historical region of Țara Hațegului. It lies at an altitude of 315 m (1,033 ft), on the banks of the Râul Galben. Hațeg is located in the south-central part of Hunedoara County, 37 km (23 mi) south of the county seat, Deva. Hațeg Island, a large island that existed in the Tethys Ocean during the late Cretaceous period and the giant pterosaur that lived on the island, Hatzegopteryx are named after the town.

== History ==
Hațeg is mentioned for the first time in the Diploma of the Joannites of 1247 as a possession of Vlach voivode Litovoi, granted from King Béla IV of Hungary. In 1360 it is mentioned as the seat of a Romanian district.

In 1765, while part of the Habsburg controlled Principality of Transylvania, the settlement was completely militarised and integrated into the Second Border Company of the First Border Regiment from Orlat, until 1851, when that unit was disbanded.

Prior to WWII, Hațeg was home to a thriving Jewish community comprising both Ashkenazi and Sephardim Jews, and featured at least one synagogue. During the Second World War, antisemitic policies of the Antonescu dictatorship resulted in the confiscation of Jewish properties, forced labour and extortion of the Jewish communities.

In 1940, all 600 of the Jewish residents of Hațeg were rounded up and housed in one location, and all of their possessions were confiscated. By the end of World War II, only 30 Jewish residents remained.

== Geology ==
Țara Hațegului (the Hațeg Country) is the region around the town of Hațeg. The fossils found in the Hațeg area span over 300 million years of Earth's geologic history, showing tropical coral reefs and volcanic island in the Tethys Sea, dinosaurs, primitive mammals, birds, and Pterosaurs (such as Hatzegopteryx, which was named for the region).

Hațeg Island was an island during the Cretaceous Period where a dwarf species of sauropod dinosaur, Magyarosaurus dacus, lived until their extinction at the end of the Cretaceous. Baron Franz Nopcsa published articles about these Mesozoic-era archosaurs on Hațeg Island. His studies led to his theory of insular dwarfism, the notion that "limited resources" on small islands can lead to a downsizing of the indigenous vertebrate animals.

Since 2015 the area has been an UNESCO Global Geopark.

== Demographics ==
According to the first ethnic census of 1850, the town had 1,194 inhabitants, 915 of them being Romanians, 92 Roma, 77 Hungarians, 62 Germans (more specifically Transylvanian Saxons), and 48 of other ethnicities. According to the 2011 census, Hațeg had 9,685 inhabitants, of which 93.15% were Romanians, 1.6% Hungarians, 1,1% of other ethnicities, and unknown for 4,14% of the population. At the 2021 census, the town had a population of 8,793; of those, 90.88% were Romanians and 7.61% of unknown ethnicities.

Historical population
Year	Pop.	±%
1850	915	—
1880	1,808	+97.6%
1900	2,367	+30.9%
1912	3,124	+32.0%
1930	3,383	+8.3%
1948	3,210	−5.1%
1956	3,853	+20.0%
1966	5,631	+46.1%
1977	8,423	+49.6%
1992	11,616	+37.9%
2002	12,507	+7.7%
2011	9,685	−22.6%
2021	8,793	−9.2%
Source: Census data

== Natives ==
- Nicholas Deak (1905—1985), American banker and a secret service operative with the OSS and the CIA
- Elena Lasconi (born 1972), TV personality and politician
- Chike Onyejekwe (born 1986), handballer
- Nneka Onyejekwe (born 1989), volleyball player

== Gallery ==
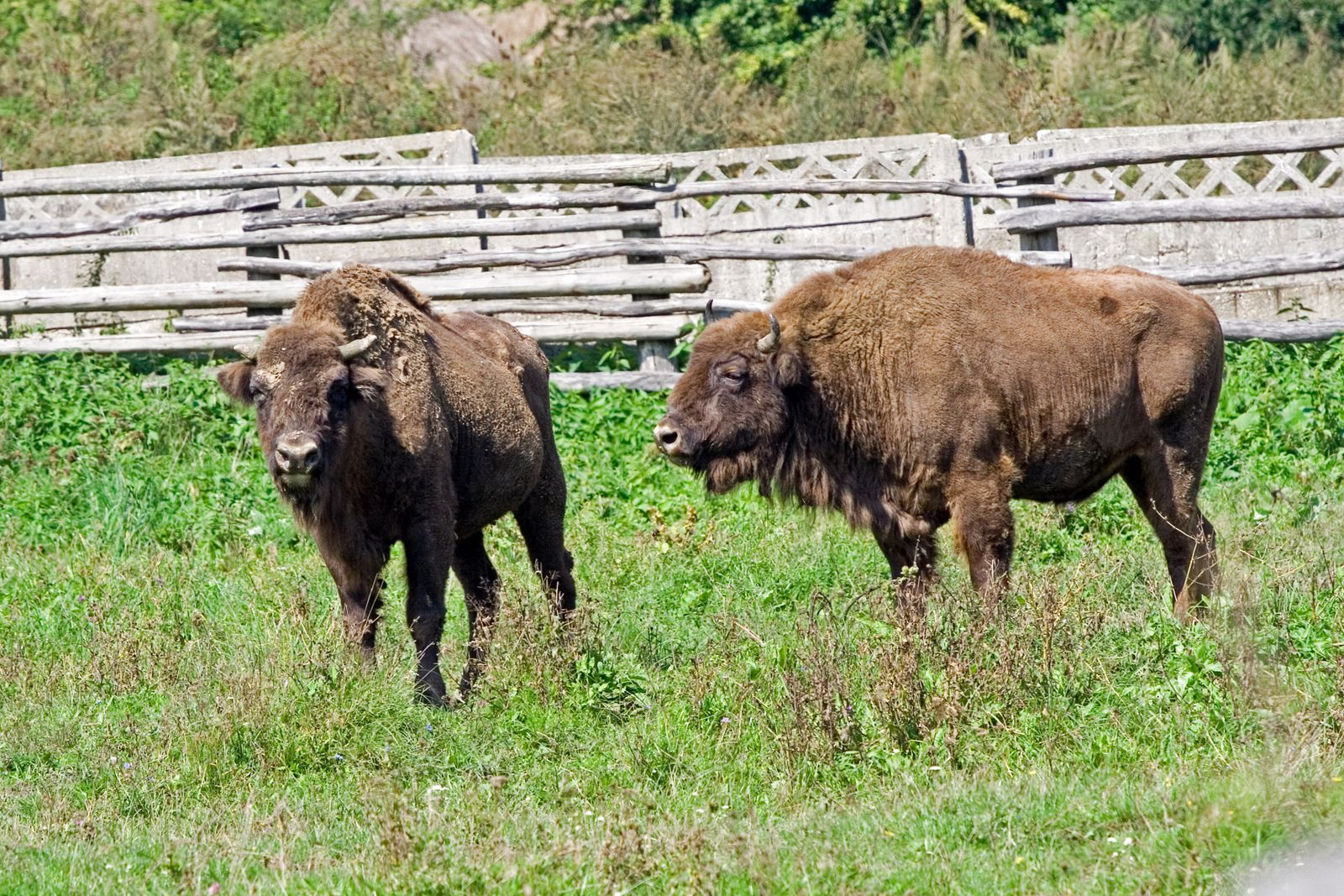
European bison in Hațeg nature reserve

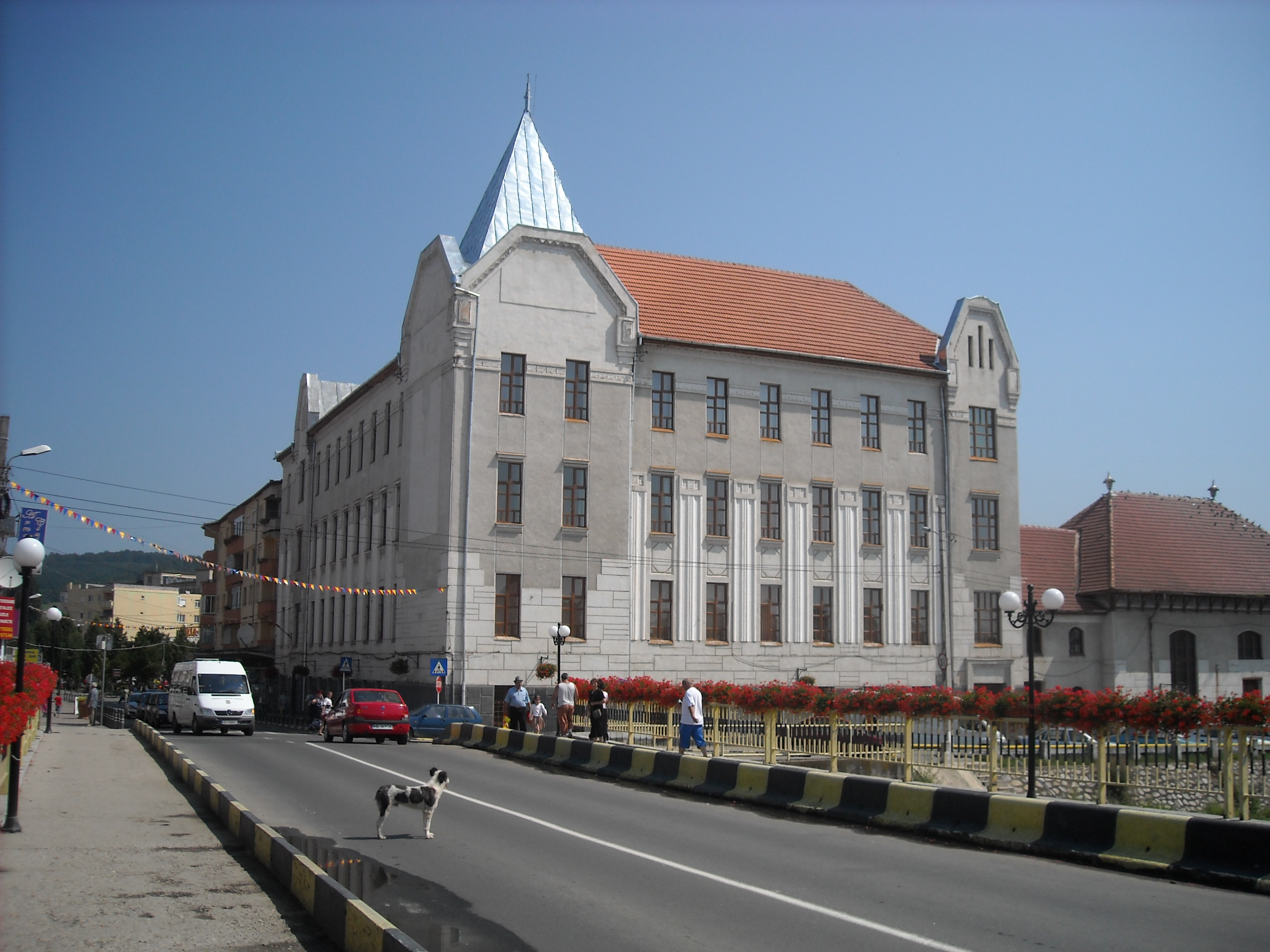
The I. C. Brătianu National College

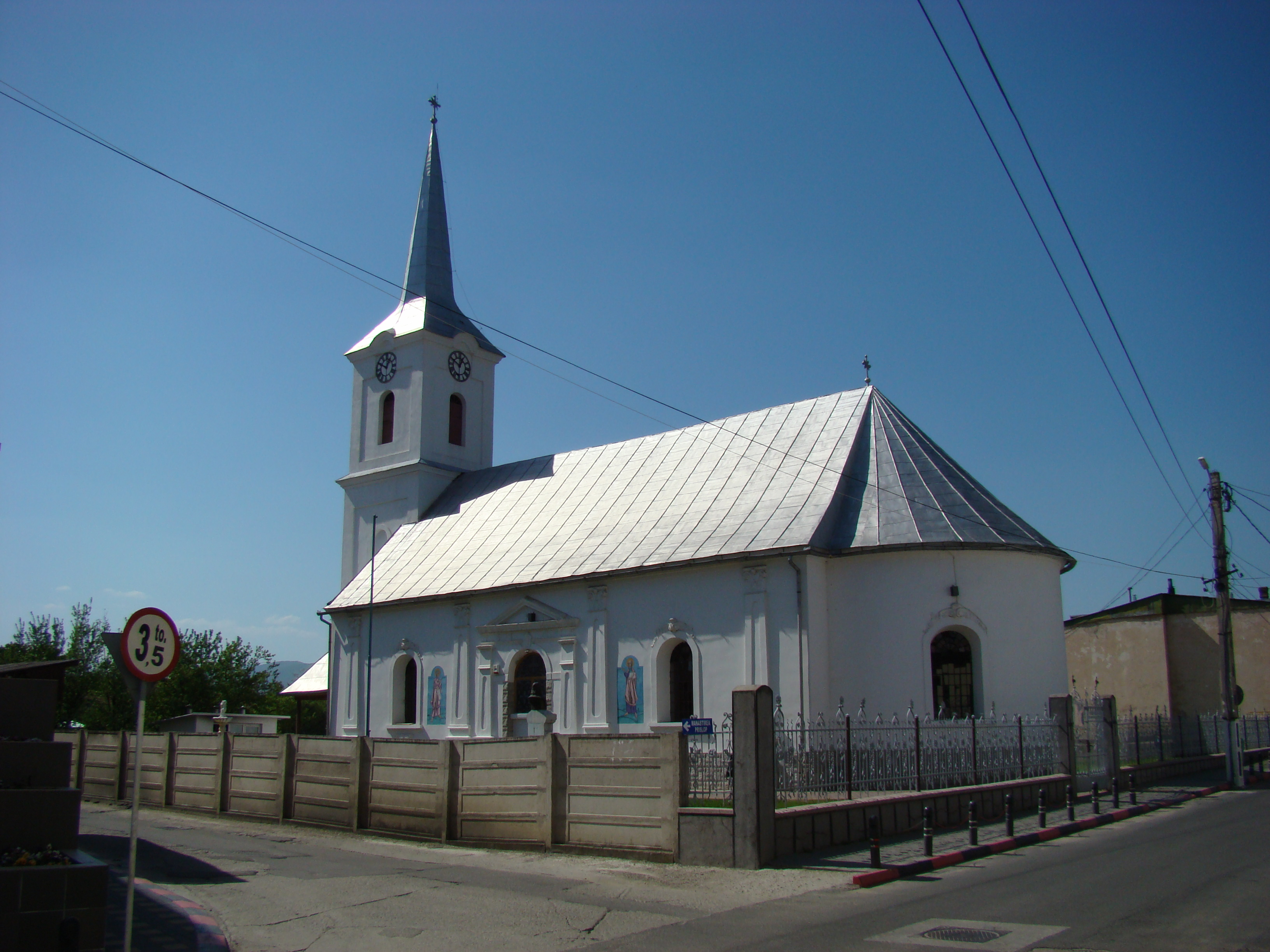
Saint Nicholas Orthodox Church

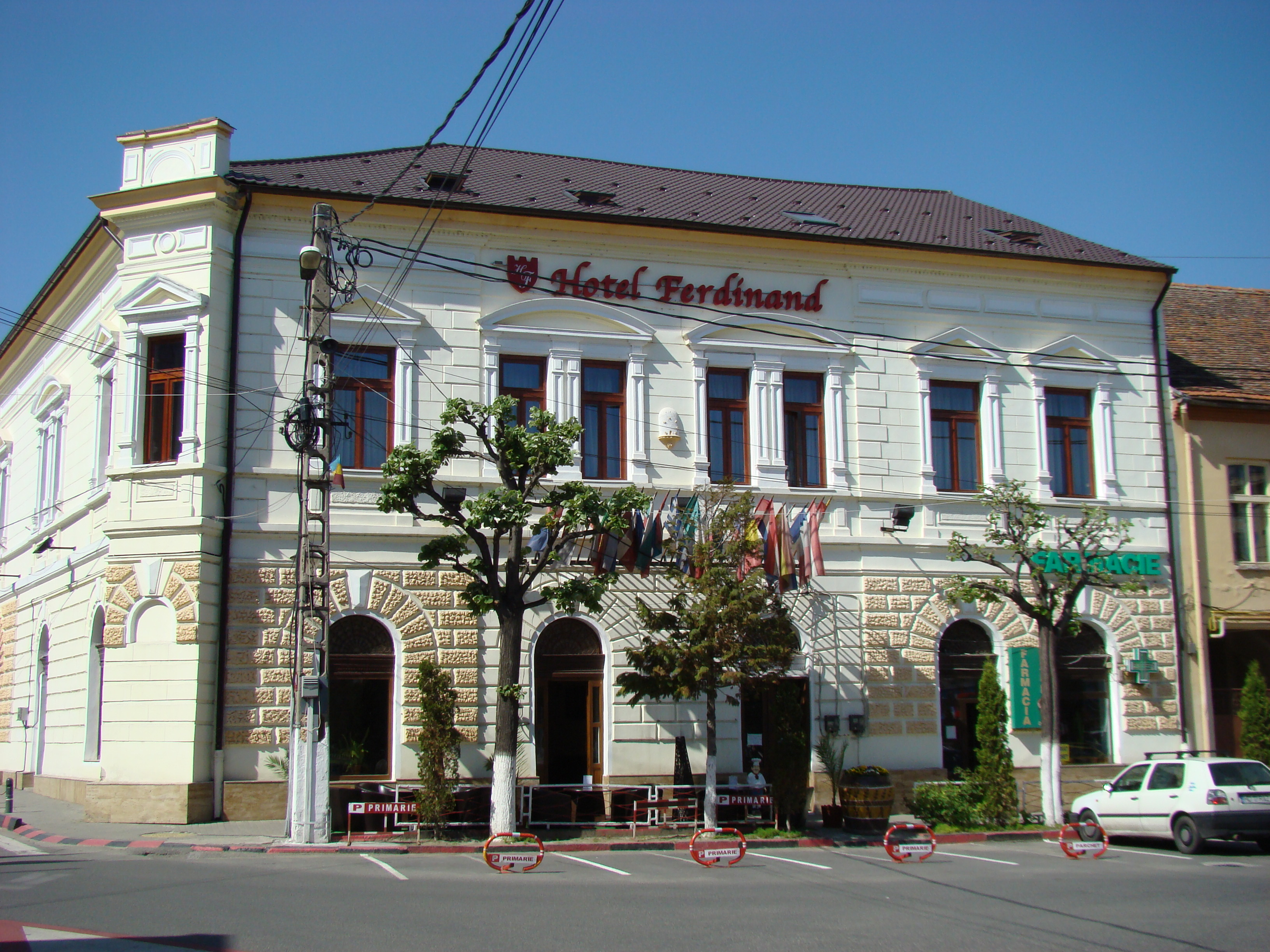
Historic bank building, today Hotel Ferdinand

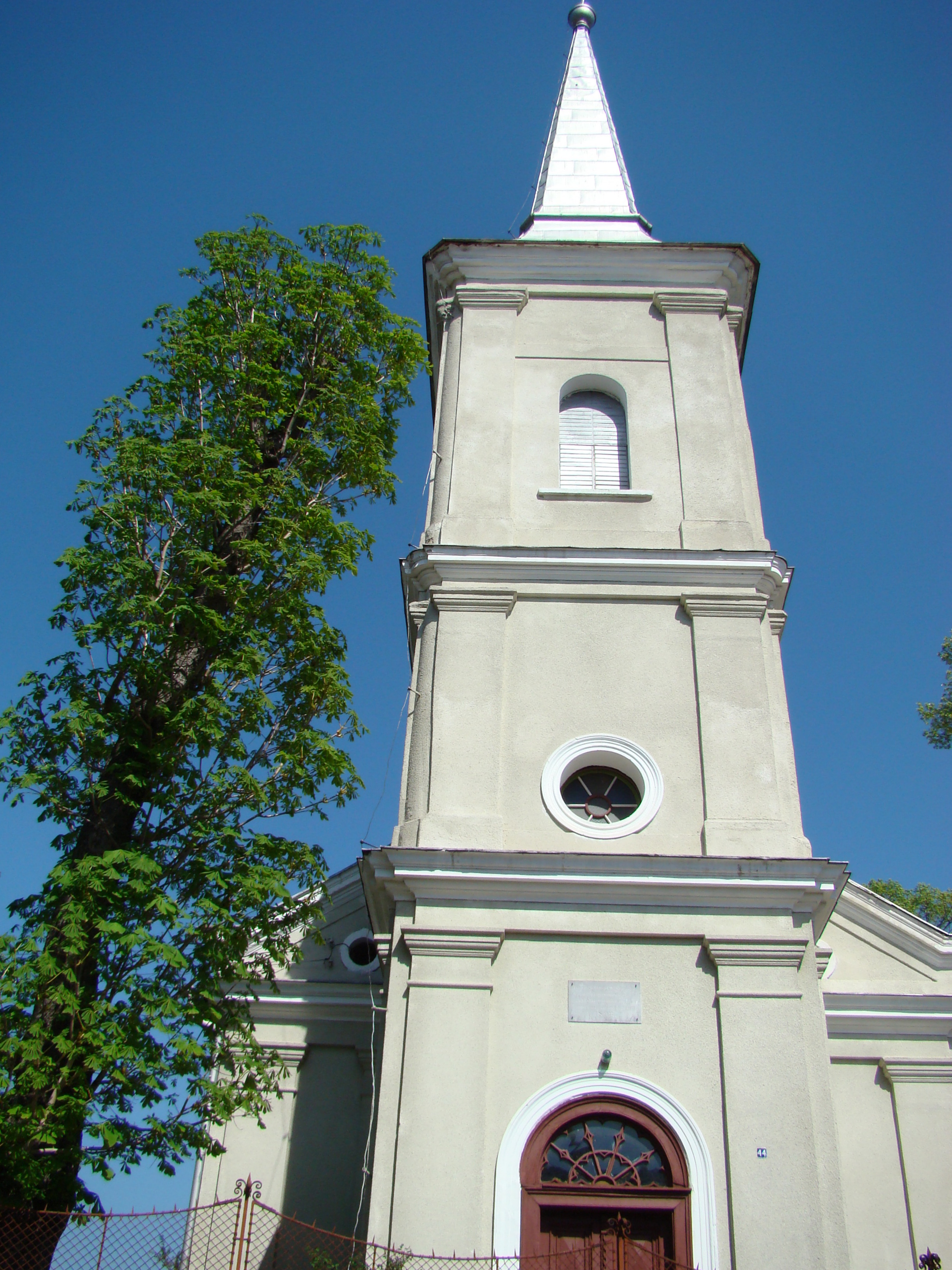
Reformed Church

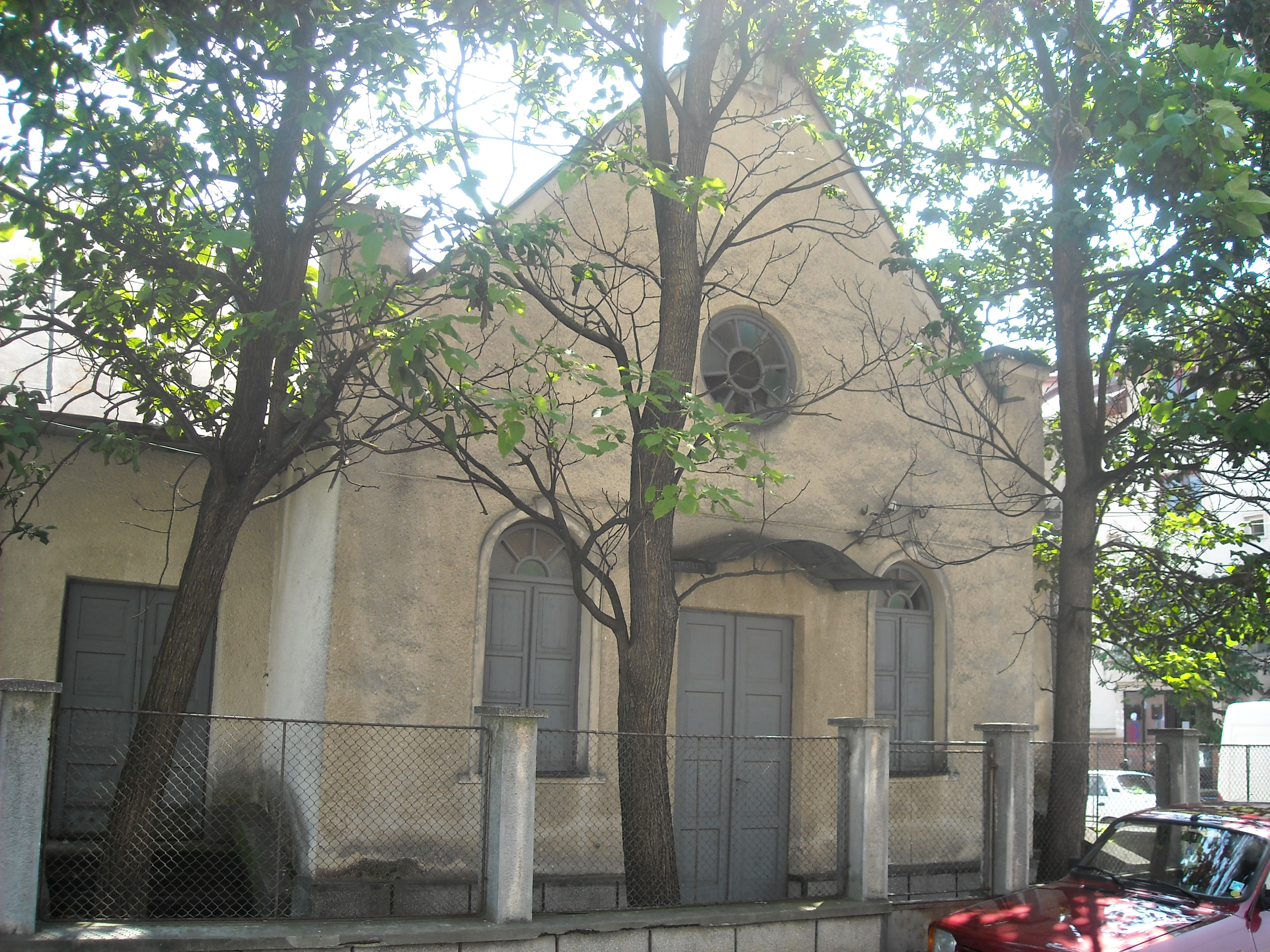
Synagogue

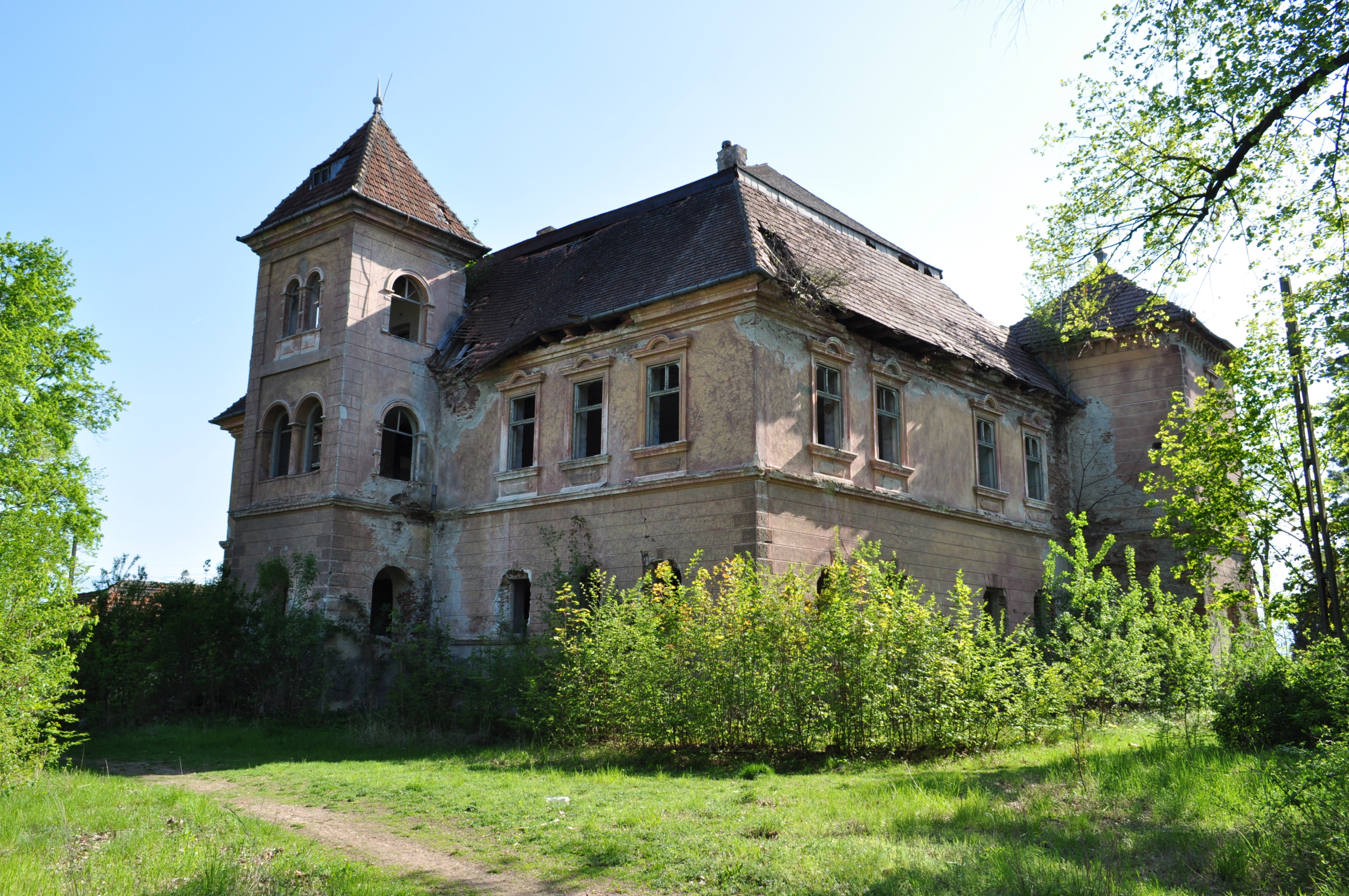
Nalatzi-Fay Manor, Nălațvad. Now in poor condition, was built in the 19th century. Between 1941 and 1944 some of the rural Jews were interned here.

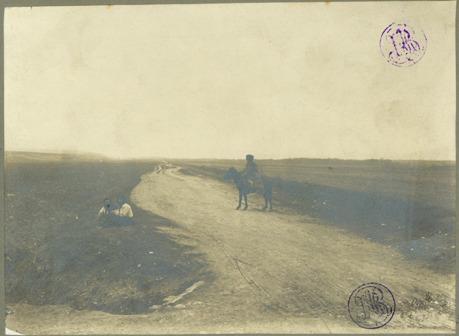
Trajan's Road near Hațeg (1900–1920)

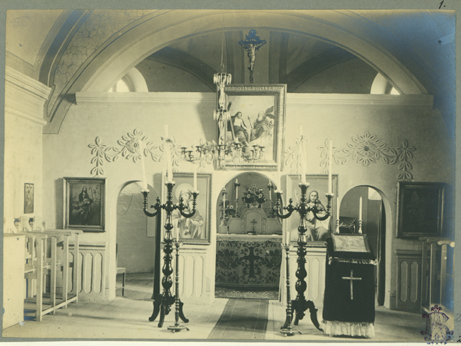
Interior of the Greek-Catholic Church (1900–1920)

== See also ==
- Hateg Country Dinosaur Geopark
