= General Berthelot =

- Commune
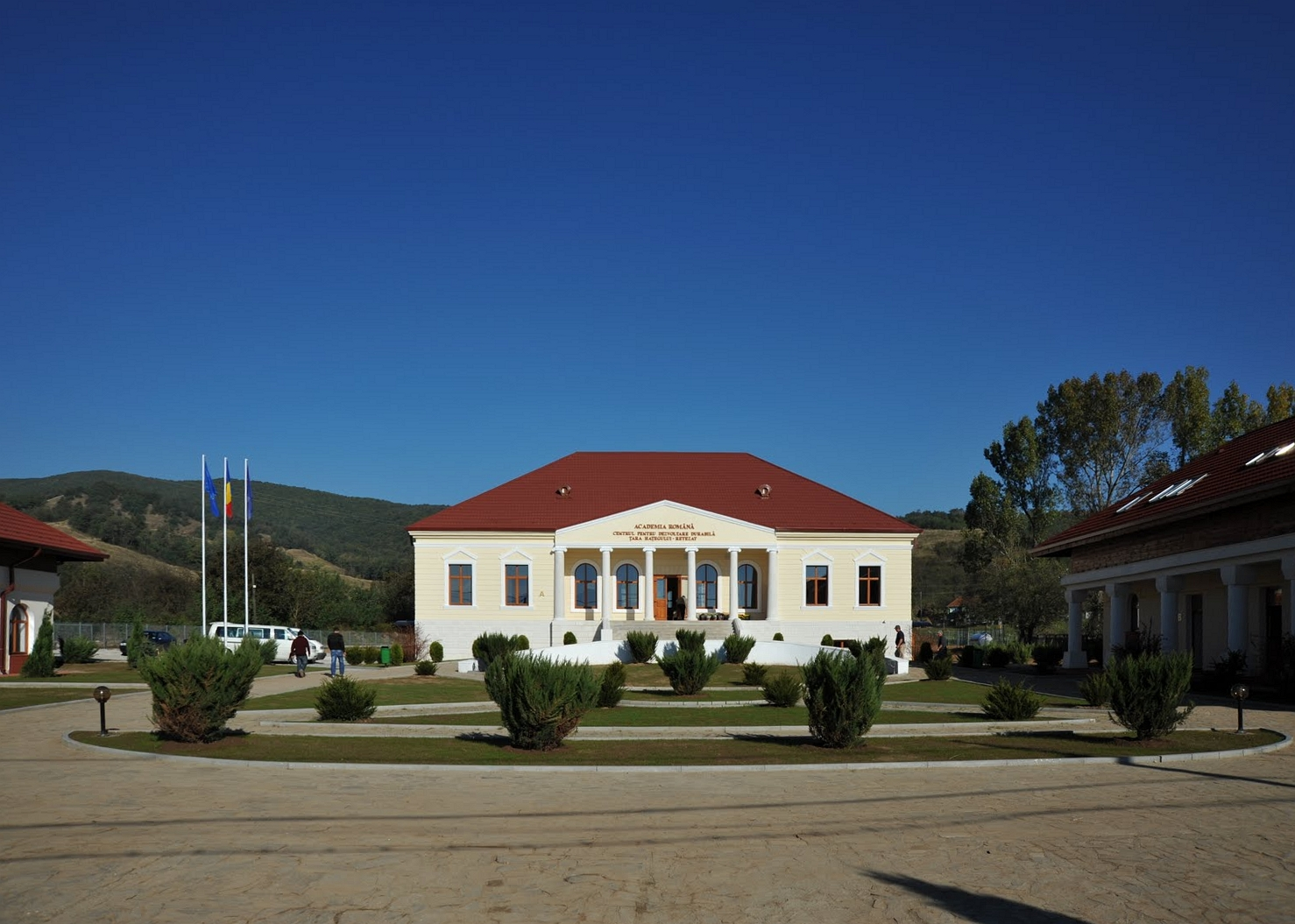
- The General Berthelot Villa

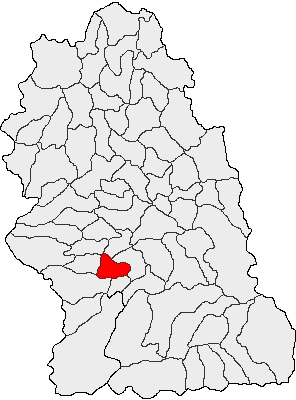
- Location in Hunedoara County

- Location in Romania
- Coordinates: 45°37′N 22°53′E
- Country: Romania
- County: Hunedoara

Government
  - Mayor (2024–2028): Marina Huzoni (PNL)
- Area: 30.74 km^{2} (11.87 sq mi)
- Elevation: 368 m (1,207 ft)
- Population (2021-12-01): 790
  - Density: 26/km^{2} (67/sq mi)
- Time zone: UTC+02:00 (EET)
  - Summer (DST): UTC+03:00 (EEST)
- Postal code: 337235
- Area code: (+40) 02 54
- Vehicle reg.: HD
- Website: www.primariaberthelot.ro

General Berthelot (Fărcădinul de Jos until 1923, Berthelot between 1923 and 1964, Unirea between 1965 and 2001; Hungarian: Alsófarkadin; German: Unterwolfsdorf) is a commune in Hunedoara County, Transylvania, Romania. It is composed of five villages: Crăguiș (Kraguis), Fărcădin (Felsőfarkadin), General Berthelot, Livezi (Gauricsa), and Tuștea (Tustya).

In 1923 and again in 2001, the commune was named after Henri Mathias Berthelot, a French general who was rewarded by King Ferdinand I of Romania for his role during World War I with properties in the village confiscated from the Nopcsa family.

Historical population
Year	Pop.	±%
1850	1,348	—
1910	1,752	+30.0%
2002	1,020	−41.8%
2011	896	−12.2%
2021	790	−11.8%
Source: Census data
