= Râul Mare (Strei) =

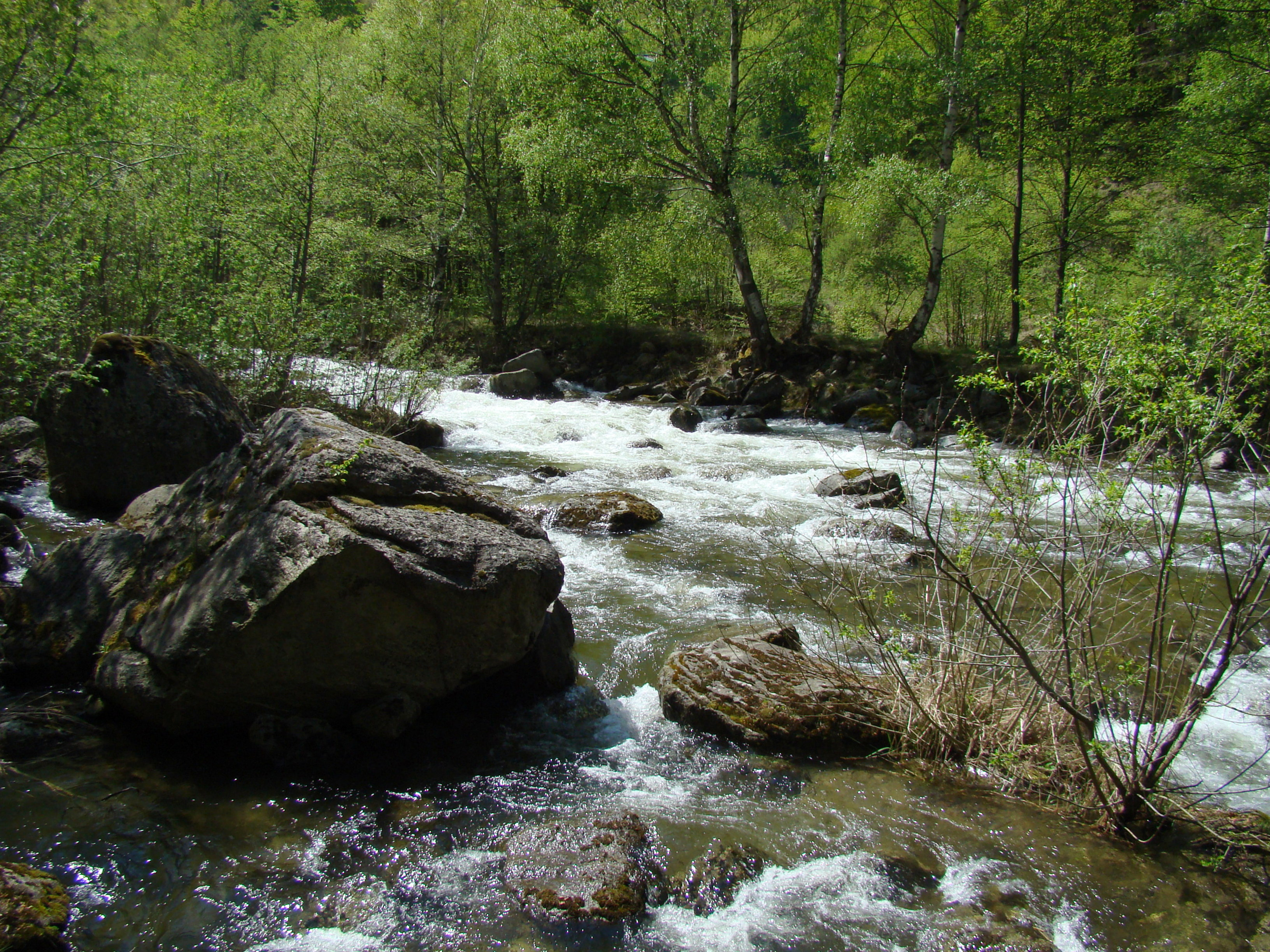

- Location within Romania

Location
- Country: Romania
- Counties: Hunedoara County
- Villages: Râu de Mori, Sântămăria-Orlea

Physical characteristics
- Source: Retezat Mountains
- Mouth: Strei
  - coordinates: 45.5902°N 22.9899°E
- Length: 64 km (40 mi)
- Basin size: 915 km^{2} (353 sq mi)

Basin features
- Progression: Strei→ Mureș→ Tisza→ Danube→ Black Sea
- Tributaries
  - left: Șes, Râul Galben
  - right: Râușor, Sibișel

The Râul Mare (upstream from its confluence with the Șes also: Lăpușnic) is a left tributary of the river Strei in Romania. It discharges into the Strei in Subcetate. Its source is in the Retezat Mountains. It flows through the reservoirs Gura Apelor, Ostrovul Mic, Păclișa and Hațeg. Its length is 64 km (40 mi) and its basin size is 915 km^{2} (353 sq mi).

== Tributaries ==
The following rivers are tributaries to the Râul Mare (from source to mouth):

- Left: Peleaga, Scocul Drăcșanului, Paltina, Berhina, Pârâul Cascadelor, Lăpușnicul Mic, Șes, Valea Pietrei, Bistra, Bonciu, Șipotu, Valea Jurii, Râul Galben
- Right: Bucura, Judele, Vâlcelul Sugărilor, Pârâu din Zlata, Rădeșul Mic, Zlata, Runcu, Râul Căldărilor, Râușor, Valea Dâljii, Sibișel
