= Densusianu =

Densusianu or Densușianu is a Romanian surname that may refer to:

- Aron Densușianu (1837–1900), literary critic
- Nicolae Densușianu (1846–1911), Romanian ethnologist, brother of Aron
- Ovid Densusianu (1873–1938), Romanian poet, son of Aron
