= Johanna Korner =

Beauty salon proprietor (1891–1969)

Madame Korner
- Born: Johanna Adler; 21 July 1891; Făgăraș
- Died: 30 March 1969 (aged 77); Double Bay
- Other name: Johanna Korner
- Occupation: beauty salon owner
- Spouse: Eugene Korner

Johanna Korner known as Madame Korner (21 July 1891 – 30 March 1969) was born in the Kingdom of Hungary and she became a beauty salon proprietor in Budapest, Paris and finally Sydney.

== Life ==
Korner was born in 1891 in Făgăraș. Her parents were Helena (born Springer) and Alfred Adler, Her father was a photographer and her aunt was in the beauty business. She trained, like her aunt, as a beautician in France, Austria and Germany and she and her aunt started the beauty business in 1904.

By 1936 she had been married to Eugene Korner for twenty years and the family's assets included several beauty parlours, her daughter and her son, George, who was a cosmetic chemist. She managed the salon in Budapest.

During the second world war her husband was press-ganged into a Jewish Labour Battalion. He was involved in the eastern front and he returned after the defeat in Moscow and the family decided to emigrate. They moved to Paris where "Madame Korner" had a salon in the Place Pigalle.

In 1951 they moved the business to Australia where the knowledge of skin care was not well known. They initially sold to European immigrant women but the habit transferred to Australian-born women. George had already opened a Madame Korner business before they arrived but he took help from his mother and his sister. George was identified as the founder of the Australian business. 1953 saw the business opening a salon and in the following year they opened a school for people who wanted to learn the Madame Korner method. In 1956 the Madame Korner range of cosmetics arrived.

The Madame Korner business grew to have outlets across the country. The designer Florence Broadhurst was among the customer's at their prestigious salon in the Chevron Hotel, Sydney in the 1960s.

== Death and legacy ==
Korner and her husband died in March 1969 in the Sydney suburb of Double Bay. The family business continued and her granddaughter and great-granddaughter came to run the business. The salons lost their appeal and by 2011 the last one closed. The Madame Korner range of cosmetics continued.
