= Densuș =

- Commune
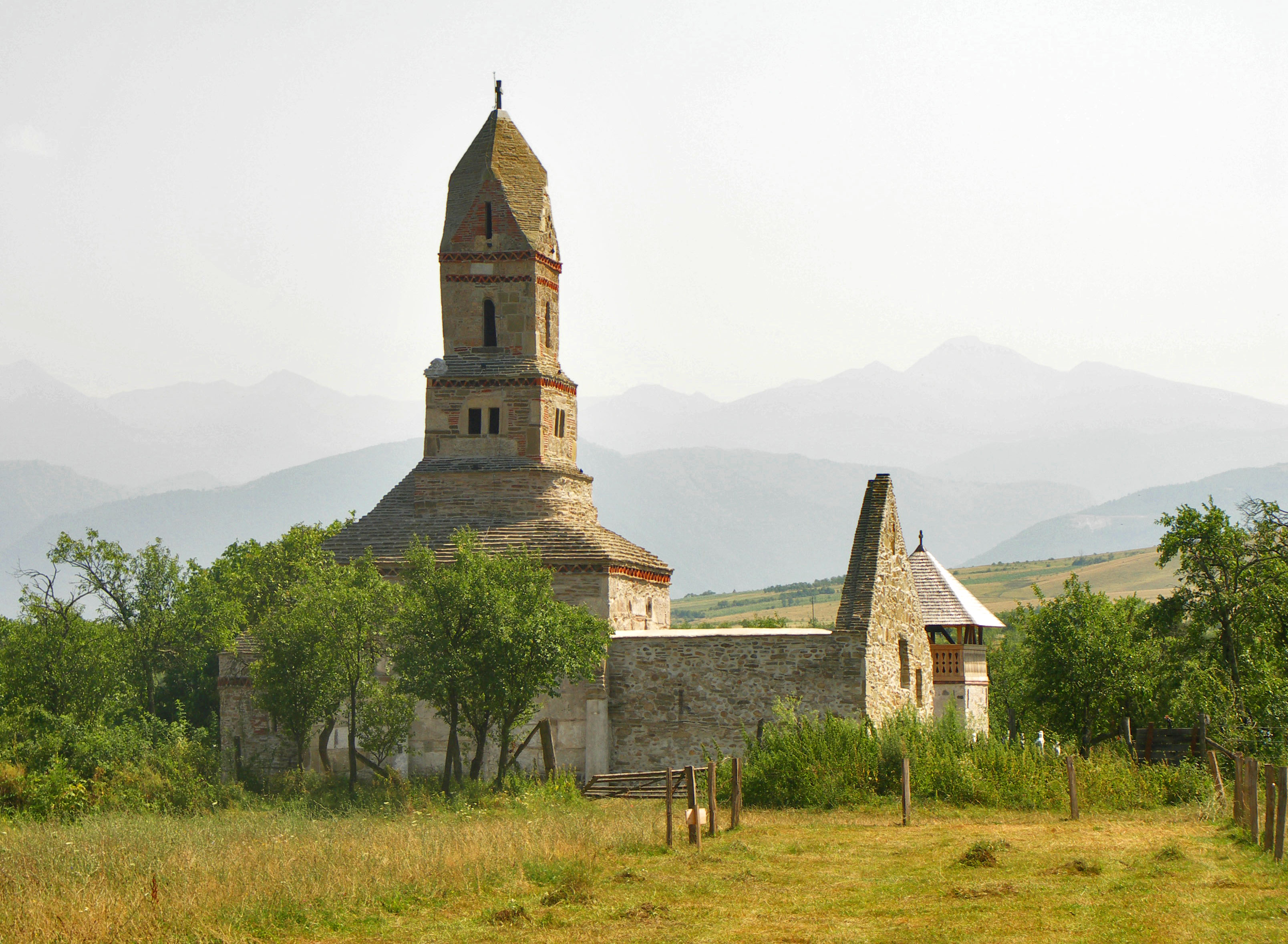
- Densuș Church, view from the North

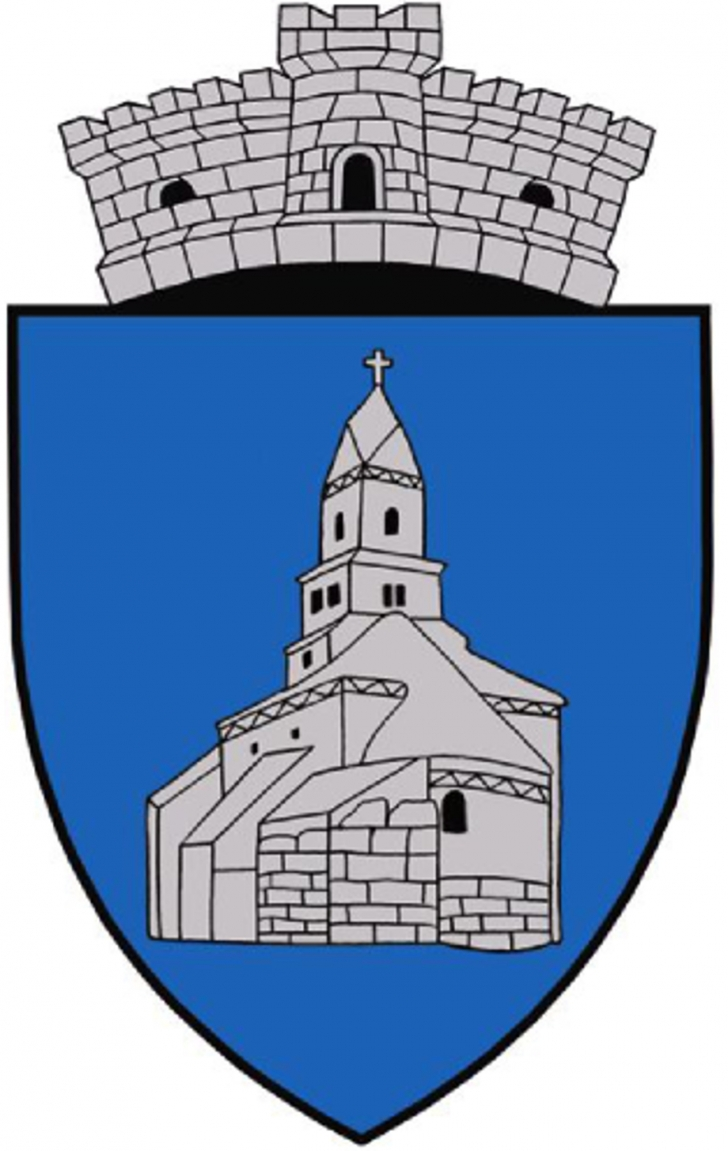
- Coat of arms

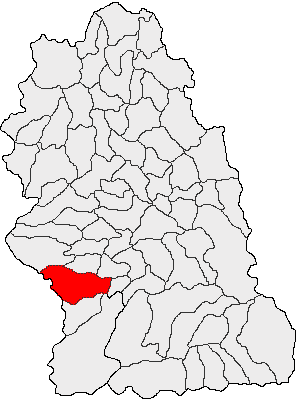
- Location in Hunedoara County

- Location in Romania
- Coordinates: 45°35′N 22°48′E
- Country: Romania
- County: Hunedoara

Government
  - Mayor (2024–2028): Nicu Lăscuț Merian (PNL)
- Area: 136.12 km^{2} (52.56 sq mi)
- Elevation: 392 m (1,286 ft)
- Population (2021-12-01): 1,301
  - Density: 9.558/km^{2} (24.75/sq mi)
- Time zone: UTC+02:00 (EET)
  - Summer (DST): UTC+03:00 (EEST)
- Postal code: 337205
- Area code: (+40) 02 54
- Vehicle reg.: HD
- Website: primariadensus.ro

Densuș (Hungarian: Demsus, German: Demsdorf) is a commune in Hunedoara County, Transylvania, Romania and the site of Densuș Church. It is composed of seven villages: Criva, Densuș, Hățăgel (Hacazsel), Peșteana (Nagypestény), Peștenița (Kispestény), Poieni (Pojény), and Ștei (Stejvaspatak).

== Geography ==
The commune is situated at an altitude of 392 m (1,286 ft), in the foothills of the Poiana Ruscă Mountains, north of the Retezat Mountains. It lies on the banks of Râul Galben and its tributaries, the Breazova and Pârâul Fierului.

Densuș is located in the southwestern part of the county, on the border with Caraș-Severin County. It is situated in the historical and ethnographical area known as Țara Hațegului, 15 km (9.3 mi) west of its hub, the town of Hațeg. The commune is crossed by national road DN68, which connects Hațeg to Caransebeș.

== Densuș Church ==
The St. Nicholas Church in Densuș is the oldest Orthodox stone church in Romania, dating from the 12th century. It has a square plan, with the nave pierced by a tower, resting on a vault and equipped with a deep semicircular apse. The entire construction is covered with stone slabs, with most of the material probably coming from nearby Ulpia Traiana Sarmizegetusa, the capital of Roman Dacia. Inside the church there are 15th century mural paintings made by artist Ștefan that show Jesus wearing Romanian traditional clothes.

Historical population
Year	Pop.	±%
1850	2,770	—
1910	3,700	+33.6%
2002	1,774	−52.1%
2011	1,577	−11.1%
2021	1,301	−17.5%
Source: Census data

== Natives ==
- Aron Densușianu (1837–1900), critic, literary historian, folklorist, and poet
- Nicolae Densușianu (1846–1911), ethnologist and collector of Romanian folklore

== See also ==
- Castra of Densuș
- Dacian fortress of Densuș
