= Castra of Densuș =

Fort in the Roman province of Dacia

- Location within Romania
- 45.5811°N 22.7883°E
- Location: Dealul cetății, Densuș, Hunedoara, Romania

History
- Founded: unknown
- Abandoned: unknown

Site notes
- Condition: Ruined

The castra of Densuș was a fort in the Roman province of Dacia. It was built by a Dacian settlement which had been founded before the Roman conquest of Dacia in 106 AD and continued to exist under Roman rule. Neither the date of the erection of the fort, nor its abandonment by the Romans have been determined. Its ruins are situated in Densuș (Romania).

== See also ==
- List of castra
