= Aron Densușianu =

Imperial Austrian-born Romanian critic, literary historian, folklorist and poet

Aron Densușianu (pen name of Aron Pop; November 19, 1837 – September 15 [O.S. September 2] 1900) was an Austrian Empire-born Romanian critic, literary historian, folklorist and poet.

== Biography ==
He was born in Densuș, Hunedoara County, in the Transylvania region. His parents were the Romanian Orthodox priest Vizantie Pop and his wife Sofia (née Popovici). He was the brother of historian Nicolae Densușianu. From 1846 to 1848, he attended the normal school in Hațeg, followed by the Blaj gymnasium (1852–60) and the Sibiu legal academy (1860–64). He made his poetry debut in 1860 in Foaie pentru minte, inimă și literatură and submitted poems, critical studies and political articles to the main Transylvanian periodicals of the time: Amicul școalei, Concordia, Federațiunea, Albina, Transilvania and Familia. A politically motivated trial was held against him in 1873, and he spent a month in prison. In 1874–75, he edited the Brașov political newspaper Orientul latin, with his brother and Ioan Alexandru Lapedatu as collaborators. He belonged to Astra, and in 1877 was elected a corresponding member of the Romanian Academy. Residing at Făgăraș, he practiced law from 1864 to 1880; in 1881, he moved to the Romanian Old Kingdom, settling in the Moldavian capital of Iași. There, he was a professor of Latin language and literature at the University of Iași, as well as a substitute professor of Romanian literary history. He was vice president of the city's Cultural League for the Unity of All Romanians chapter, and from 1893 to 1897 edited Revista critică-literară.

As a fiction writer, he was mediocre but prolific and ambitious; his work includes a two-volume saga, Negriada (1879, 1884). His main calling was as a critic and literary historian (Aventuri literare, 1881; Cercetări literare, 1887). His views were grounded in a rigorous, classically oriented theoretical base; he was studious, conscientious and erudite, a competent interpreter of old literature as well as that dating to the 1848 revolution era. However, he was less conscious of contemporary literature's achievements and a firm opponent of Junimism, which caused his contributions to be neglected or minimized for a long time.

In 1864, he married Elena Circa, a native of Cernatu in Brașov County four years his junior. The couple had a number of children, including Ovid; Eliza, who would marry Vespasian Erbiceanu; and Elena, a future physician and university professor married to Emil Pușcariu.
