= Racovița (Făgăraș) =

- Location within Romania

Location
- Country: Romania
- Counties: Brașov County
- Villages: Făgăraș

Physical characteristics
- Mouth: Olt
  - location: Făgăraș
  - coordinates: 45.8457°N 24.9427°E
- Length: 26 km (16 mi)
- Basin size: 106 km^{2} (41 sq mi)

Basin features
- Progression: Olt→ Danube→ Black Sea
- Tributaries
  - right: Berivoi

The Racovița is a left tributary of the river Olt in Romania. It discharges into the Olt in the city of Făgăraș. Its length is 26 km (16 mi) and its basin size is 106 km^{2} (41 sq mi).
