= Pârâul Fierului =

- Location within Romania

Location
- Country: Romania
- Counties: Hunedoara County

Physical characteristics
- Source: Poiana Ruscă Mountains
- Mouth: Râul Galben
  - coordinates: 45.5914°N 22.6969°E
- Length: 9 km (5.6 mi)
- Basin size: 42 km^{2} (16 sq mi)

Basin features
- Progression: Râul Galben→ Râul Mare→ Strei→ Mureș→ Tisza→ Danube→ Black Sea
- Tributaries
  - left: Lacuri

The Pârâul Fierului (also: Valea Fierului) is a right tributary of the Râul Galben in Romania. It flows into the Râul Galben upstream from Ștei. Its length is 9 km (5.6 mi) and its basin size is 42 km^{2} (16 sq mi).
