= Dacian fortress of Densuș =

- Location within Romania
- 45.5811°N 22.7883°E
- Location: Dealul cetății, Densuș, Hunedoara, Romania

Site notes
- Condition: Ruined

It was a Dacian fortified town.
