= Densuș Church =

Church in Hunedoara County, Romania

Coordinates: 45°34′57″N 22°48′19″E

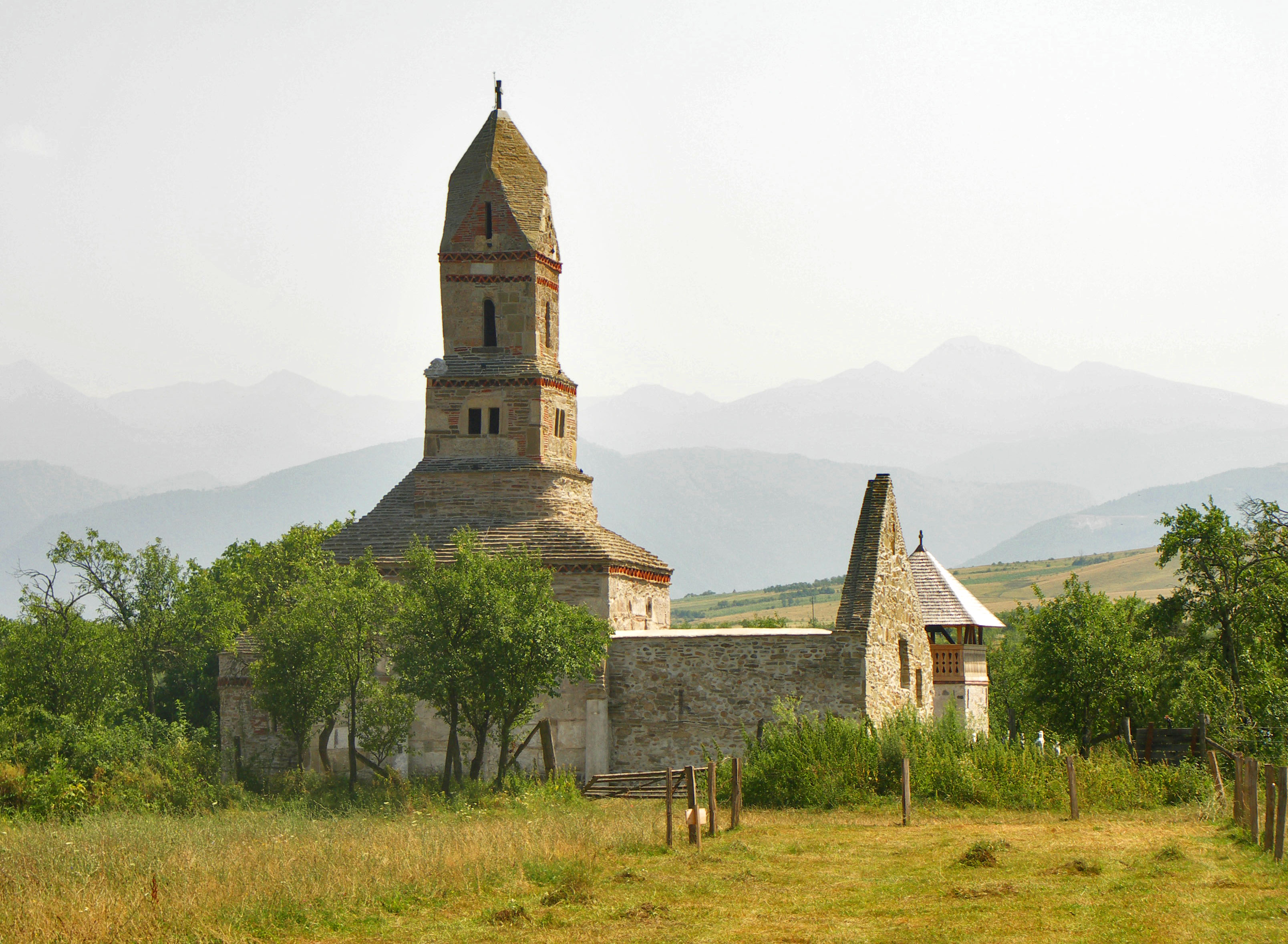
Densuș church – view from the north

The Densuș Church (also known as St Nicholas' Church) in the village of Densuș, Hunedoara County is the oldest Orthodox stone church in Romania. Up to the 15th century it was part of a court of the local knezial family.

== The building ==
The church has a stone tower above the naos. The altar, nave, and diaconicon were built in the same period, while the side chapel is a later addition. Inside the church there are 15th-century mural paintings that show Jesus wearing traditional Romanian clothes. These paintings were made by artist Ștefan. In the 18th century more paintings were added by Simion de Pitești and his apprentices.

From 1566 to the end of the 19th century, the building functioned as a Calvinist church, too. Because of this, the paintings were lime-whited in the 16th century, and its bell tower has a Hungarian inscription from 1782.

The church nave is square with 1 m thick walls and a perimeter of 7.40 m x 7.25 m. In the middle of the naos there are 4 pillars delimiting another square area with 3-meter sides. The 3-meter-long altar is semi-circular, the positioning of the altar table suggests the iconostasis initially had two entrances. The building itself is made from various Roman ruins materials: columns, posts, and pedestals; limestone blocks, marble blocks, tiles, and terra cotta pipes, bound by raw stone and sometimes bricks, and on the roof were placed two lion statues. Such details like the lion statues or columns attached to the exterior wall do not seem to have any structural utility.

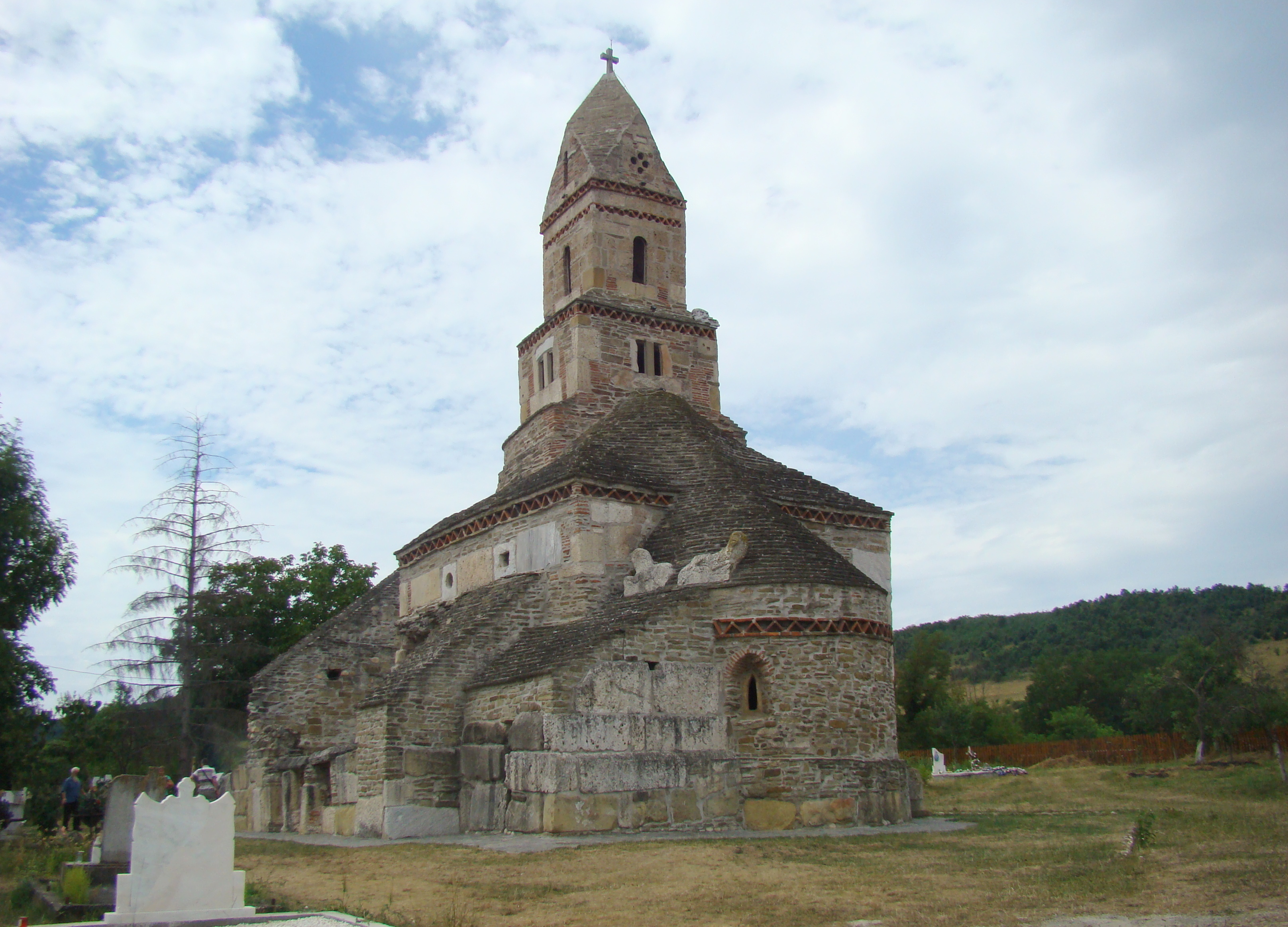
Another exterior view with the two lion statues incorporated in the roof

The tower rises on four levels, with the first level being the roof of the naos' pillar square. The next 3 levels are not separated, and the access to their interior is done from the outside of the church. On the top of the naos there is a small hidden chamber connected to the tower, but not distinguishable from the outside.

The church was repaired at least several times from the 14th century onwards, and by the late 19th century was close to being demolished before the administration classed it as a historical monument. The original roof, mostly from stone tiles, collapsed during this time and was replaced with a shingle roof.

== Hypothesis about Densuș ==
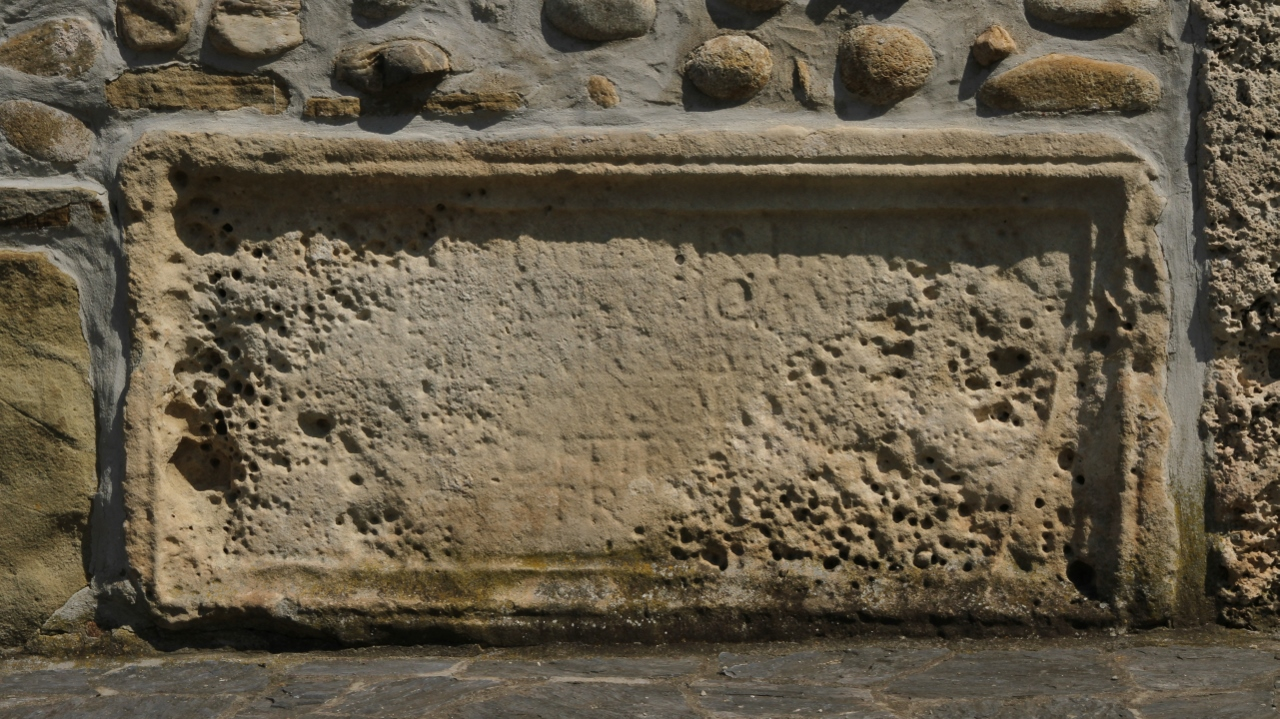
Worn out inscription incorporated in the wall

Archaeological work was done on the area outside the church, researchers unanimously stating the building did not disturb any of the graves. Since the oldest finding was a coin from the time of Sigismund of Luxemburg (14th-15th century), these two facts led to the conclusion that the current church was built just earlier than that.

According to Daniela Marcu-Istrate, the analysis of the church indicates it was rebuilt around the pillar square in the naos between 1250 and 1400 CE. The plan of the old pillar church resembles the pillar church uncovered in 2011 in Alba Iulia, placing its earliest building date in the 10th or 11th century.

Analysing the modifications done to the plan of the church and the addition of some compartments, researcher Radu Popa considered the changes to be connected to the passing of the church from a court chapel of the local knezes to an edifice of collective use.

Other researchers have compared it to a stone church from Sântămăria-Orlea built at the end of the 13th century.

The church has generated a number of less adequate hypotheses about its foundation for example, that it was once a Dacian temple dedicated to Zamolxis, upon which the conquering Romans built a temple dedicated to the god Mars.
