= Berivoi =

- Location within Romania

Location
- Country: Romania
- Counties: Brașov County
- Villages: Berivoi, Făgăraș

Physical characteristics
- Mouth: Racovița
  - location: Făgăraș
  - coordinates: 45.8337°N 24.9597°E
- Length: 29 km (18 mi)
- Basin size: 80 km^{2} (31 sq mi)

Basin features
- Progression: Racovița→ Olt→ Danube→ Black Sea
- Tributaries
  - right: Dăculea, Copăcioasa

The Berivoi (also: Făgărășel) is a right tributary of the river Racovița in Romania. It discharges into the Racovița in the city Făgăraș. Its length is 29 km (18 mi) and its basin size is 80 km^{2} (31 sq mi).
