= Făgăraș =

- Municipality
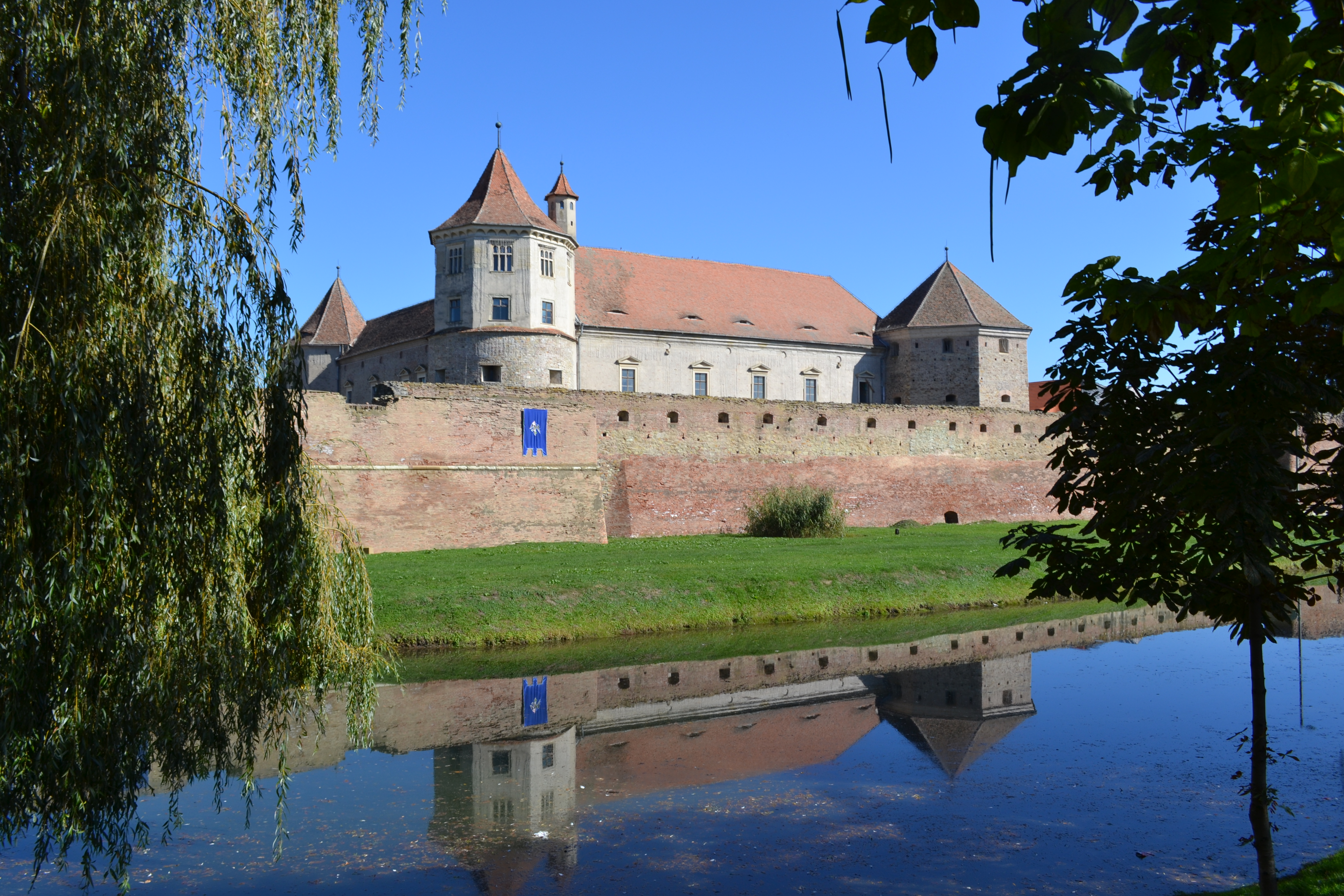
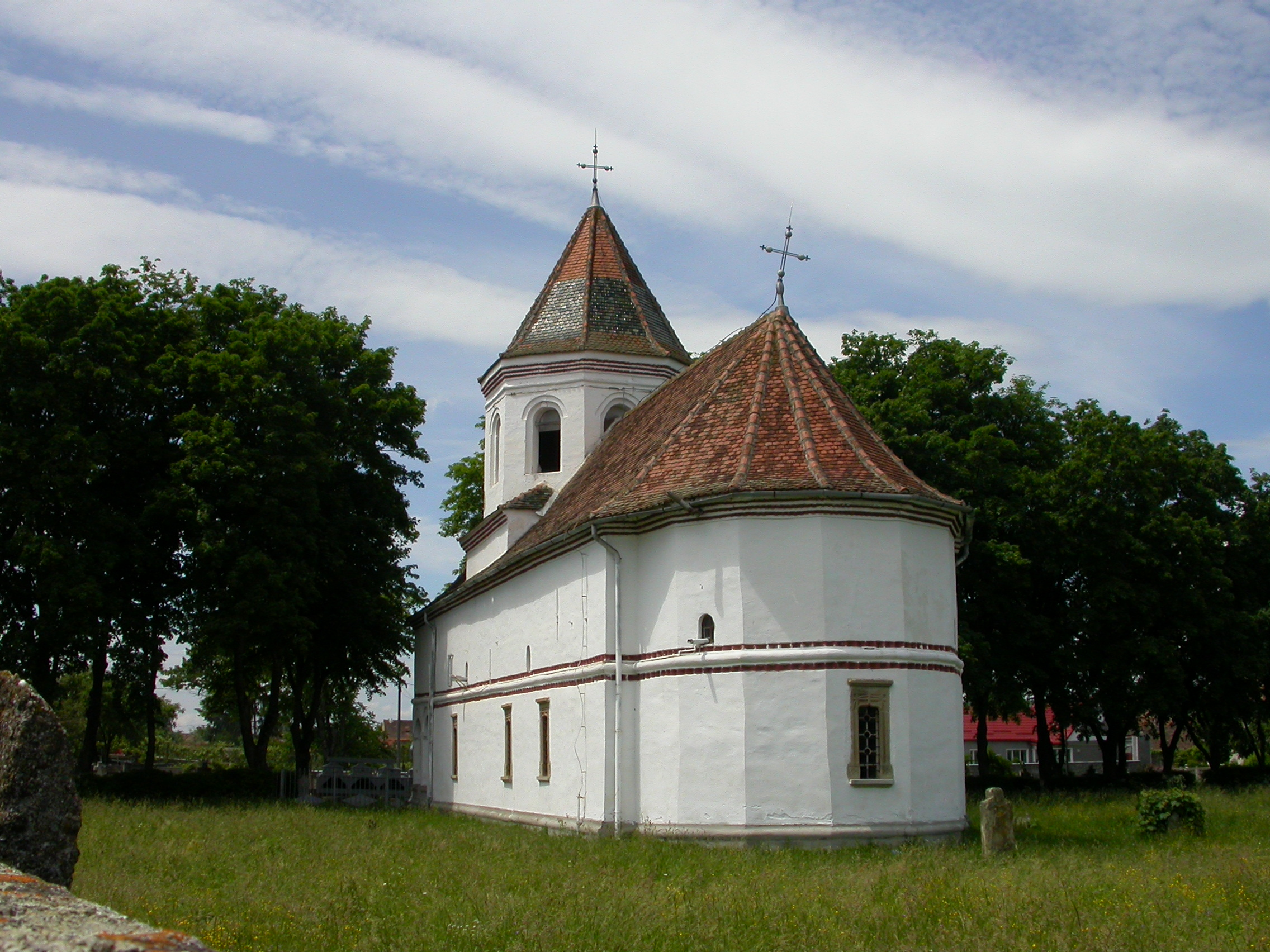
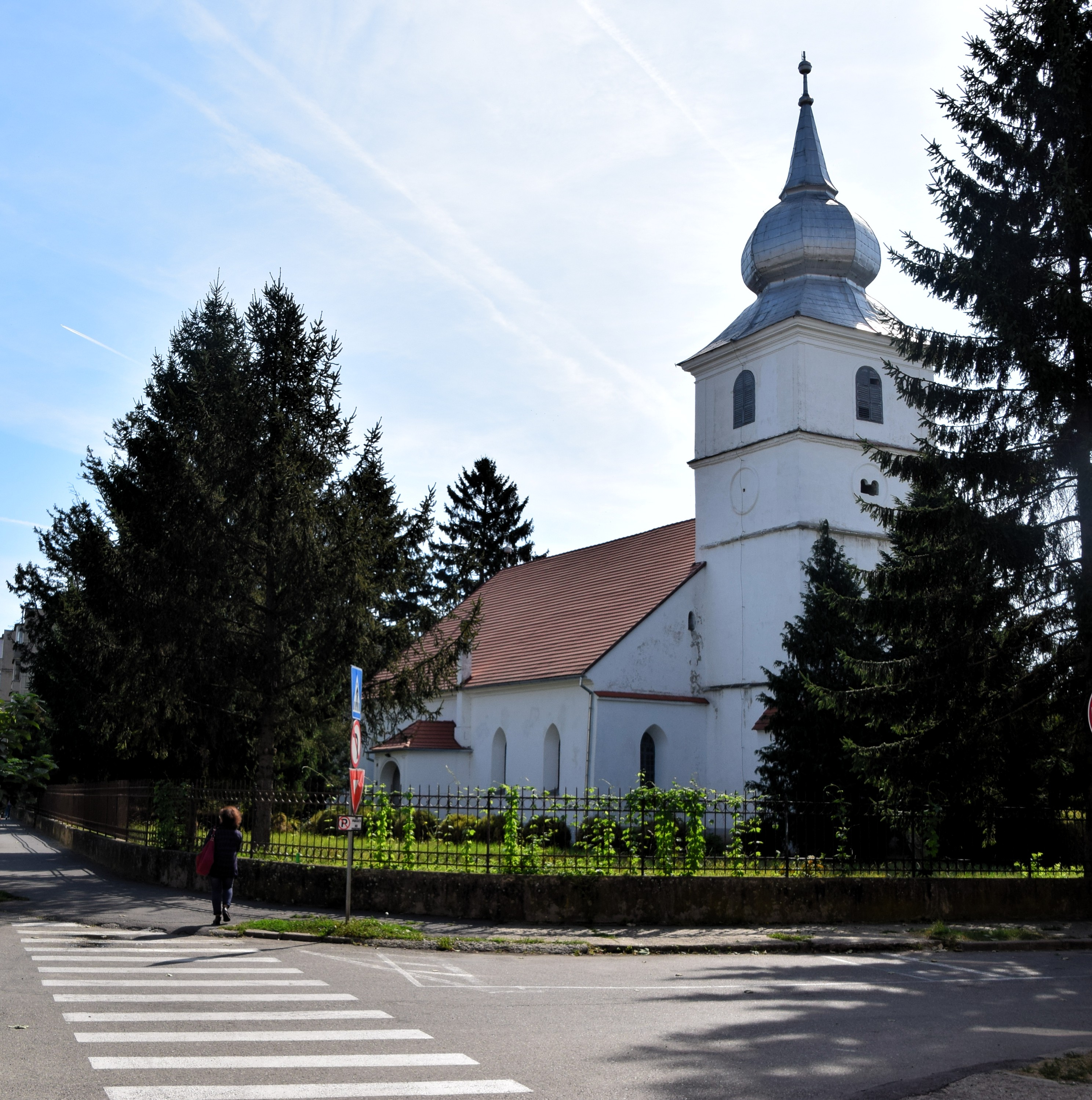
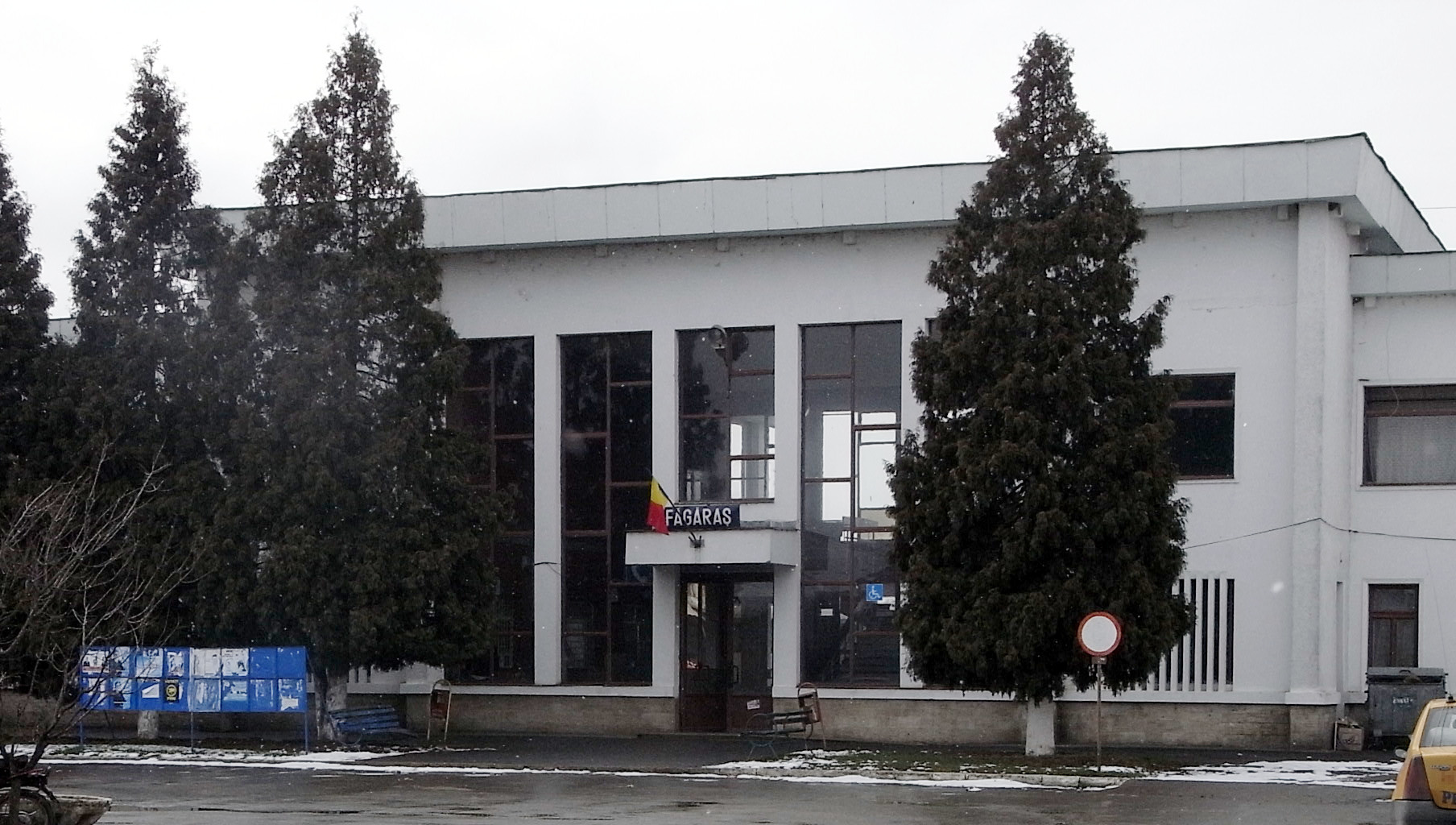
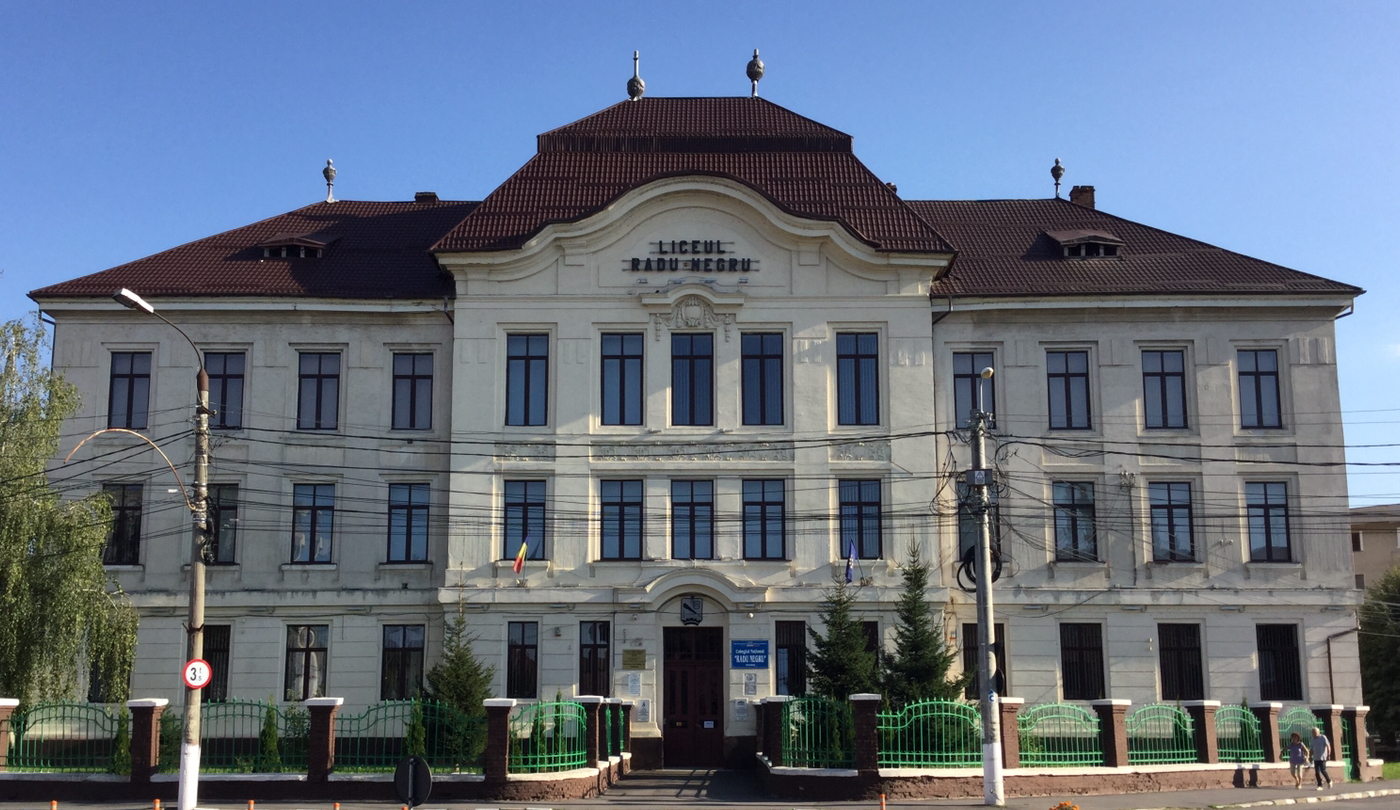
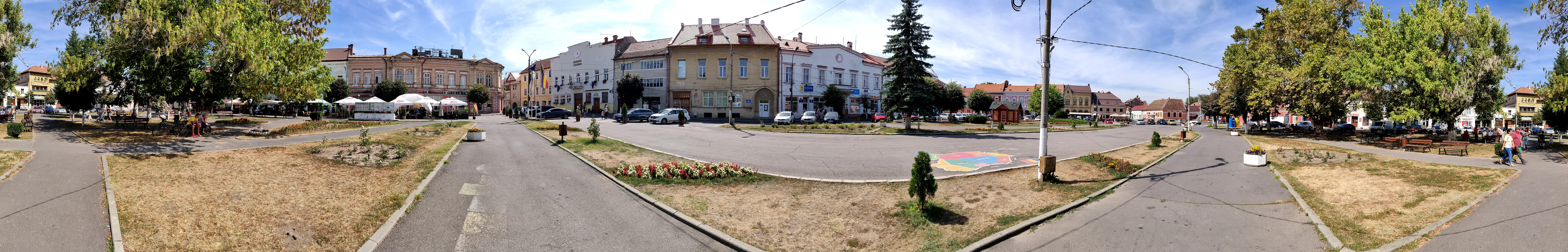
- Făgăraș Citadel St. Nicholas Church Reformed Church Făgăraș Train Station Radu Negru National College Republic Square

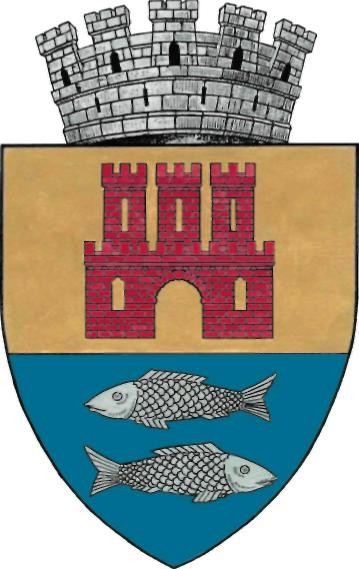
- Coat of arms

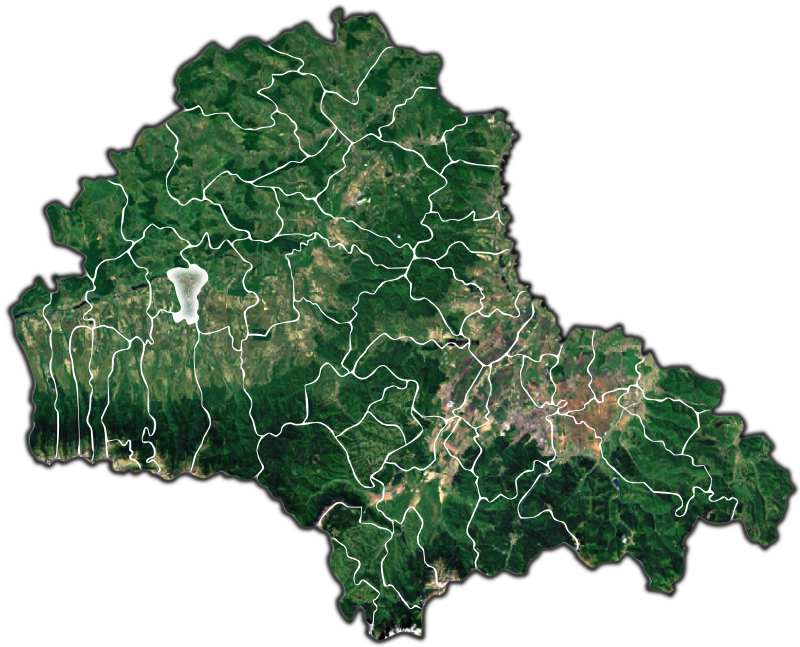
- Location in Brașov County

- Location in Romania
- Coordinates: 45°50′41″N 24°58′27″E
- Country: Romania
- County: Brașov

Government
  - Mayor (2024–2028): Gheorghe Sucaciu (PSD)
- Area: 36.41 km^{2} (14.06 sq mi)
- Elevation: 429 m (1,407 ft)
- Population (2021-12-01): 26,284
  - Density: 721.9/km^{2} (1,870/sq mi)
- Time zone: UTC+02:00 (EET)
  - Summer (DST): UTC+03:00 (EEST)
- Postal code: 505200
- Area code: (+40) 02 68
- Vehicle reg.: BV
- Website: www.primaria-fagaras.ro

Făgăraș (Romanian pronunciation: [fəɡəˈraʃ]; German: Fogarasch, Fugreschmarkt, Hungarian: Fogaras) is a city in central Romania, located in Brașov County. It lies on the river Olt and has a population of 26,284 as of 2021. It is situated in the historical region of Transylvania, and is the main city of a subregion, Țara Făgărașului.

== Geography ==
The city is located at the foothills of the Făgăraș Mountains, on their northern side. It is traversed by the DN1 road, 66 km (41 mi) west of Brașov and 76 km (47 mi) east of Sibiu. On the east side of the city, between an abandoned field and a gas station, lies the geographical center of Romania, at 45°50′N 24°59′E.

The Olt River flows east to west on the north side of the city; its left tributary, the Berivoi River, discharges into the Olt on the west side of the city, after receiving the waters of the Racovița River. The Berivoi and the Racovița were used to bring water to a since-closed major chemical plant located on the outskirts of the city.

The small part of the city that lies north of the Olt is known as Galați. A former village first recorded in 1396, it was incorporated into Făgăraș in 1952.

== Name ==
One explanation is that the name was given by the Pechenegs, who called the nearby river Fagar šu (Fogaras/Făgăraș), which in the Pecheneg language means ash(tree) water.

According to linguist Iorgu Iordan, the name of the town is a Romanian diminutive of a hypothetical collective noun *făgar ("beech forest"), presumably derived from fag, "beech tree". Hungarian linguist István Kniezsa deemed this idea unlikely.

Another interpretation is that the name derives from the Hungarian word fogoly (partridge).

There has also been speculation that the name can be explained by folk etymology, as the rendering of the words fa ("wooden") and garas ("mite") in Hungarian. Legends state that money made out of wood had been used to pay the peasants who built the Făgăraș Citadel, an important fortress near the border of the Kingdom of Hungary, around 1310. This view is in harmony with an idea advanced by Iorgu Iordan, who suggested a diminutive derivation from *făgar, found elsewhere in Romania as well.

== History ==
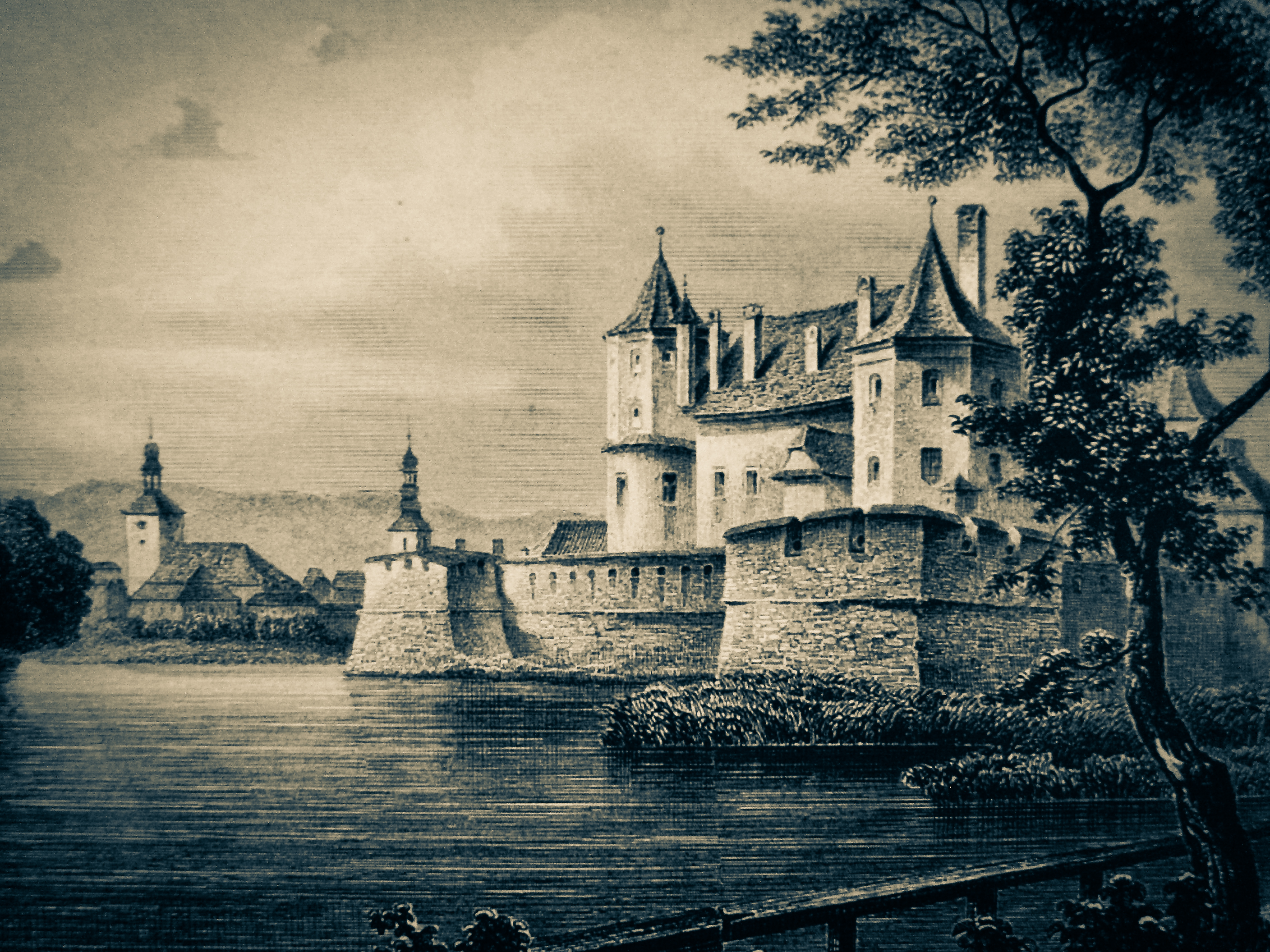
Engraving of the Făgăraș Citadel by Ludwig Rohbock (by 1883)

Historical population
Year	Pop.	±%
1850	3,930	—
1880	5,307	+35.0%
1890	5,861	+10.4%
1900	6,457	+10.2%
1910	6,579	+1.9%
1930	7,841	+19.2%
1948	9,296	+18.6%
1956	17,256	+85.6%
1966	22,934	+32.9%
1977	33,827	+47.5%
1992	44,931	+32.8%
2002	36,121	−19.6%
2011	28,330	−21.6%
2021	26,284	−7.2%
Source: Census data

Făgăraș, together with Amlaș, constituted during the Middle Ages a traditional Romanian local-autonomy region in Transylvania. The first written Hungarian document mentioning Romanians in Transylvania referred to Vlach lands ("Terra Blacorum") in the Făgăraș Region in 1222. (In this document, Andrew II of Hungary gave Burzenland and the Cuman territories South of Burzenland up to the Danube to the Teutonic Knights.) After the Tatar invasion in 1241–1242, Saxons settled in the area. In 1369, Louis I of Hungary gave the Royal Estates of Făgăraș to his vassal, Vladislav I of Wallachia. As in other similar cases in medieval Europe (such as Foix, Pokuttya, or Dauphiné), the local feudal had to swear oath of allegiance to the king for the specific territory, even when the former was himself an independent ruler of another state. Therefore, the region became the feudal property of the princes of Wallachia, but remained within the Kingdom of Hungary. The territory remained in the possession of Wallachian princes until 1464.

Except for this period of Wallachian rule, the town itself was centre of the surrounding royal estates. During the rule of Transylvanian Prince Gabriel Bethlen (1613–1629), the city became an economic role model city in the southern regions of the realm. Bethlen rebuilt the fortress entirely.

Ever since that time, Făgăraș was the residence of the wives of Transylvanian Princes, as an equivalent of Veszprém, the Hungarian "city of queens". Of these, Zsuzsanna Lorántffy, the widow of George I Rákóczy established a Romanian school here in 1658. Probably the most prominent of the princesses residing in the town was the orphan Princess Kata Bethlen (1700–1759), buried in front of the Reformed church. The church holds several precious relics of her life. Her bridal gown, with the family coat of arms embroidered on it, and her bridal veil now covers the altar table. Both are made of yellow silk.

Făgăraș was the site of several Transylvanian Diets, mostly during the reign of Michael I Apafi. The church was built around 1715–1740. Not far from it is the Radu Negru National College, built in 1907-1909. Until 1919, it was a Hungarian-language gymnasium where Mihály Babits taught for a while.

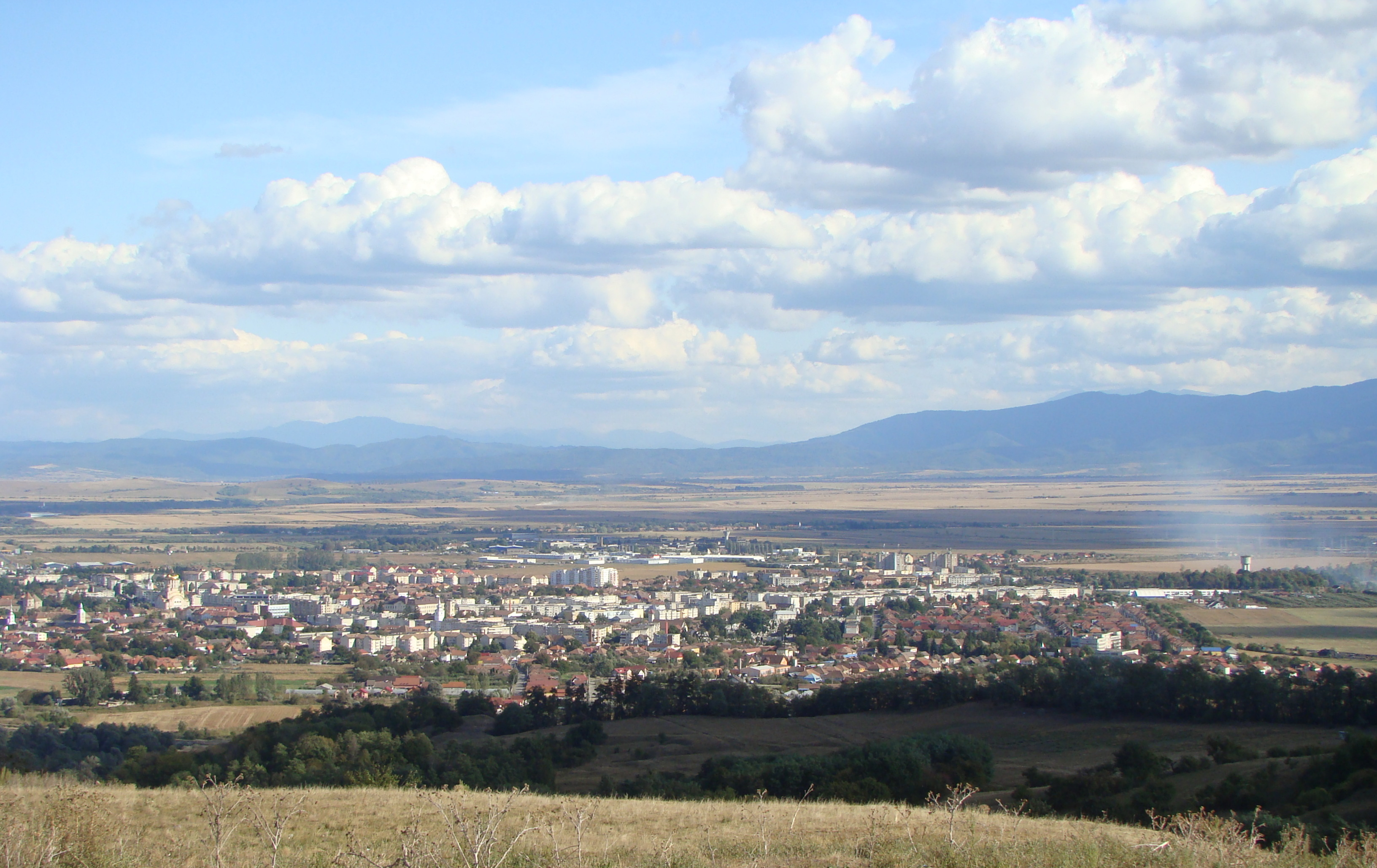
The city of Făgăraș, with the Făgăraș Mountains in the background

A local legend says that Negru Vodă left the central fortress to travel south past the Transylvanian Alps to become the founder of the Principality of Wallachia, although Basarab I is traditionally known as the 14th century founder of the state. By the end of the 12th century the fortress itself was made of wood, but it was reinforced in the 14th century and became a stone fortification.

In 1850, the town had 3,930 inhabitants, of whom 1,236 were Germans, 1,129 Romanians, 944 Hungarians, 391 Roma, 183 Jews, and 47 of other ethnicities, meanwhile in 1910, the town had 6,579 inhabitants with the following proportion: 3,357 Hungarians, 2,174 Romanians, and 1,003 Germans. According to the 2011 census, the city of Făgăraș had 30,714 residents; of those for whom data was available, 91.7% were Romanians, 3.8% Roma, 3.7% Hungarians, and 0.7% German. At the 2021 census, the city had a population of 26,284, of which 73.29% were Romanians, 8.58% Roma, and 2.24% Hungarians.

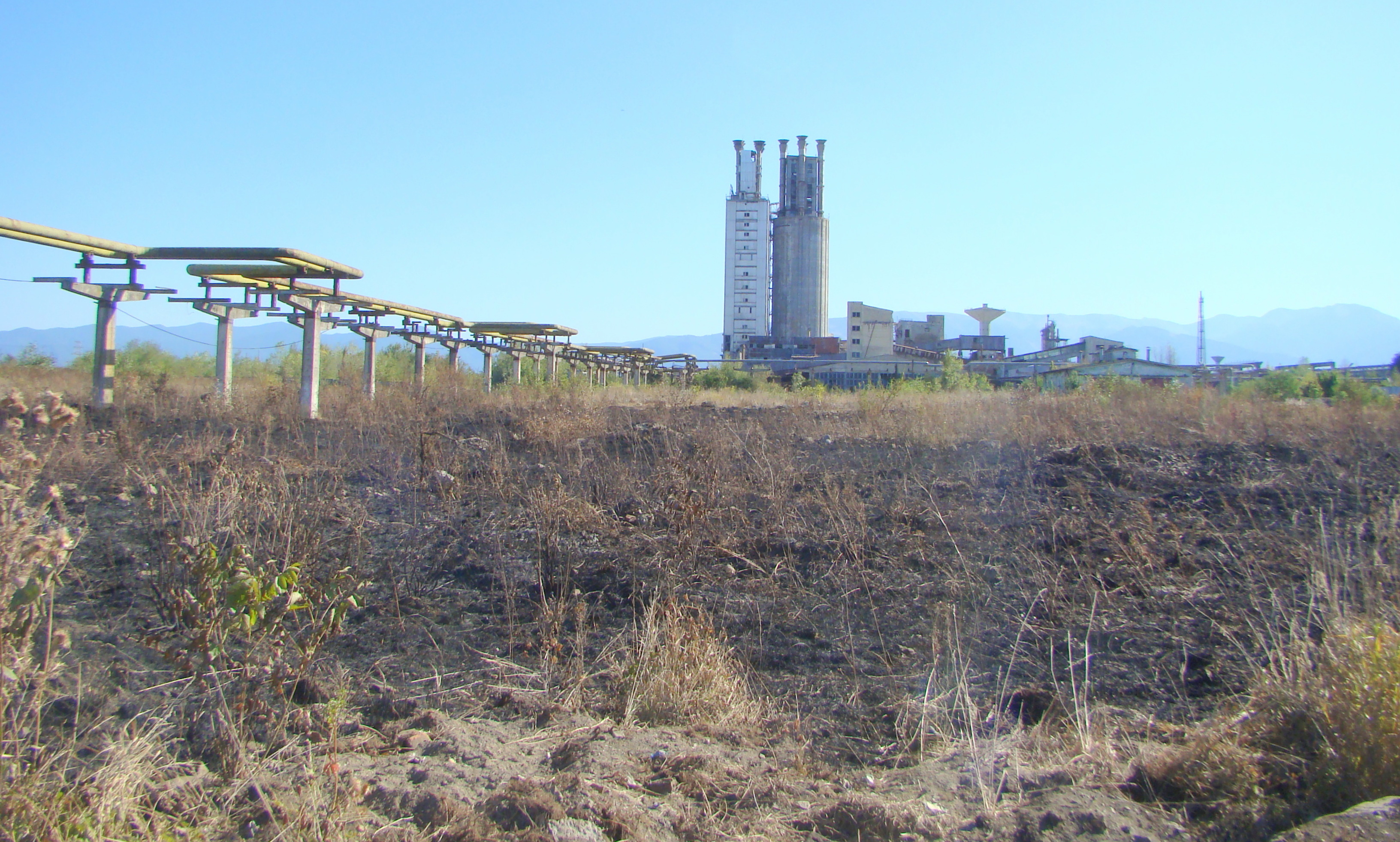
Abandoned chemical plant

Făgăraș's castle was used as a stronghold by the Communist regime. During the 1950s it was a prison for opponents and dissidents. After the fall of the regime in 1989, the castle was restored and is currently used as a museum and library.

The city's economy was badly shaken by the disappearance of most of its industries following the 1989 Revolution and the ensuing hardships and reforms. Some of the city's population left as guest workers to Italy, Spain, or Ireland.

=== Jewish history ===
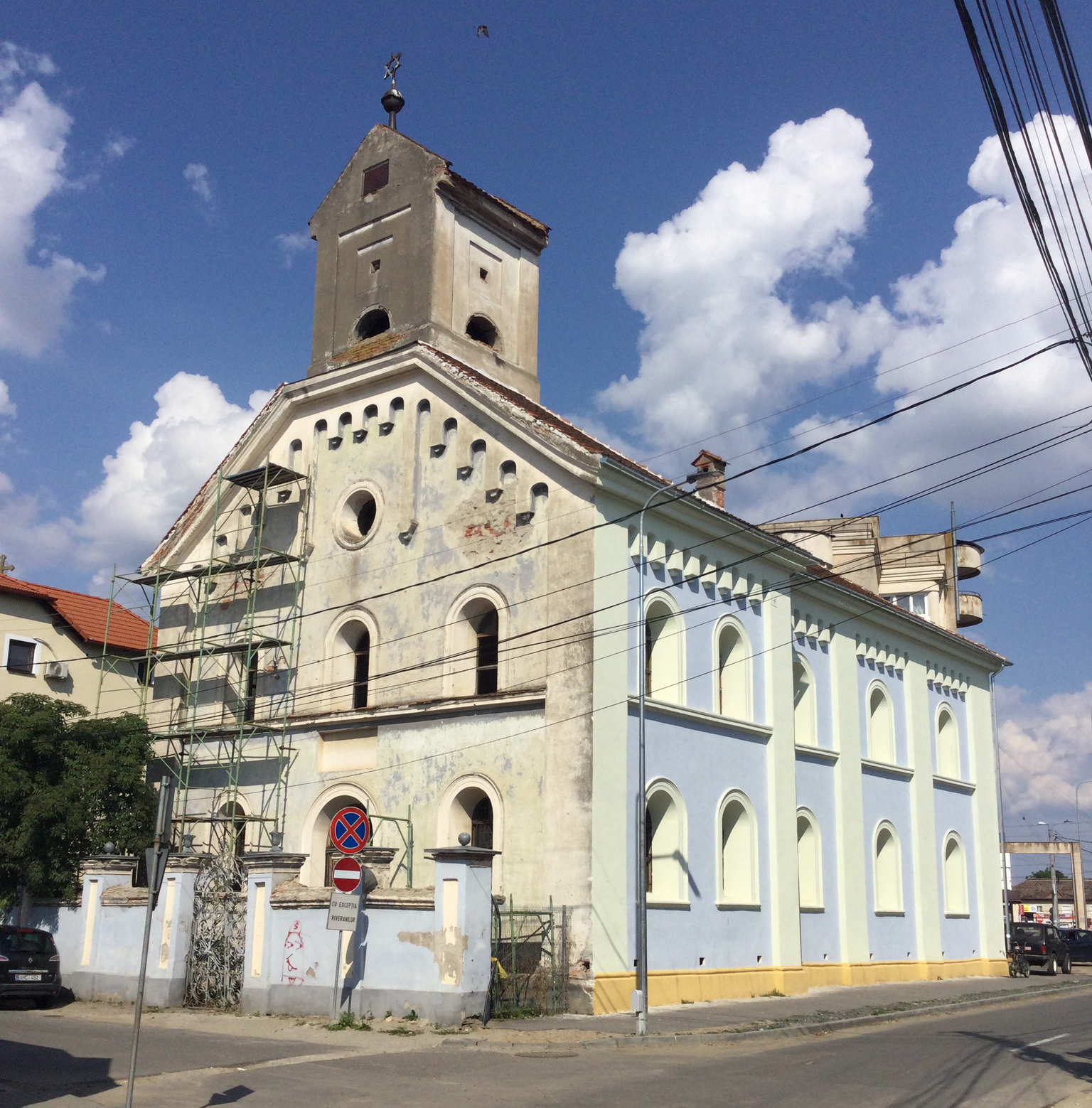
Făgăraș synagogue (1858)

A Jewish community was established in 1827, becoming among southern Transylvania's largest by mid-century. Yehuda Silbermann, its first rabbi (1855–1863), kept a diary of communal events. This is still extant and serves as a source on the history of Transylvanian Jewry. In 1869, the local community joined the Neolog association, switching to an Orthodox stance in 1926. A Jewish school opened in the 1860s.

There were 286 Jews in 1856, rising to 388 by 1930, or just under 5% of the population. During World War II, local Germans as well as the Iron Guard attacked Jews and plundered their property. Sixty Jews were sent to forced labor. After the 1944 Romanian coup d'état rescinded anti-Semitic laws, many left for larger cities or emigrated to Palestine. The last Jew of Făgăraș died in 2013.

== Climate ==
Făgăraș has a humid continental climate (Dfb in the Köppen climate classification).

Climate data for Făgăraș (elevation 428m, 2014–2026 normals, extremes 1980–present)
Month	Jan	Feb	Mar	Apr	May	Jun	Jul	Aug	Sep	Oct	Nov	Dec	Year
Record high °C (°F)	17.3 (63.1)	20.3 (68.5)	26.8 (80.2)	30.8 (87.4)	31.6 (88.9)	35.1 (95.2)	37.5 (99.5)	38.0 (100.4)	38.9 (102.0)	30.8 (87.4)	26.1 (79.0)	16.6 (61.9)	38.9 (102.0)
Mean daily maximum °C (°F)	2.8 (37.0)	6.8 (44.2)	11.8 (53.2)	16.7 (62.1)	20.8 (69.4)	26.0 (78.8)	27.5 (81.5)	28.3 (82.9)	23.3 (73.9)	17.3 (63.1)	10.4 (50.7)	4.7 (40.5)	16.4 (61.4)
Daily mean °C (°F)	−1.7 (28.9)	1.7 (35.1)	5.7 (42.3)	10.0 (50.0)	14.6 (58.3)	19.4 (66.9)	20.6 (69.1)	20.5 (68.9)	16.2 (61.2)	10.3 (50.5)	5.2 (41.4)	1.0 (33.8)	10.3 (50.5)
Mean daily minimum °C (°F)	−6.2 (20.8)	−3.3 (26.1)	−0.3 (31.5)	3.3 (37.9)	8.3 (46.9)	12.9 (55.2)	13.6 (56.5)	12.8 (55.0)	9.0 (48.2)	3.4 (38.1)	0.1 (32.2)	−2.6 (27.3)	4.2 (39.6)
Record low °C (°F)	−31.4 (−24.5)	−28.5 (−19.3)	−25.9 (−14.6)	−8.0 (17.6)	−3.6 (25.5)	1.4 (34.5)	5.5 (41.9)	2.4 (36.3)	−3.3 (26.1)	−8.3 (17.1)	−19.0 (−2.2)	−29.0 (−20.2)	−31.4 (−24.5)
Average precipitation mm (inches)	24.9 (0.98)	21.9 (0.86)	38.4 (1.51)	36.0 (1.42)	92.6 (3.65)	75.3 (2.96)	85.3 (3.36)	43.7 (1.72)	45.3 (1.78)	37.3 (1.47)	27.8 (1.09)	20.8 (0.82)	549.3 (21.62)
Average precipitation days (≥ 1.0 mm)	6.8	4.8	7.0	6.8	11.5	9.2	9.9	5.5	5.9	6.2	5.9	5.3	84.8
Average snowy days	7.3	4.9	2.8	1.1	0	0	0	0	0	0	1.9	4.4	22.4
Source 1: Meteomanz (2014-2026), Infoclimat (1980-2010)
Source 2: CJ Brașov

== Administration ==
The political composition of the town council after the 2024 Romanian local elections is as follows:

Party	Seats	Current Council
Social Democratic Party (PSD)	11	
National Liberal Party (PNL)	3	
Party of the Roma (PR)	2	
Future of Făgăraș Country Party	2	
Alliance for the Union of Romanians (AUR)	1	

== Personalities ==
- Radu Negru (Negru-Vodă), legendary ruler of Wallachia (1290–1300).
- Gabriel Bethlen (1580–1629), Prince of Transylvania between 1613–1629.
- Inocențiu Micu-Klein (1692–1768), bishop of Alba Iulia and Făgăraș (1728–1751) and Primate of the Romanian Greek-Catholic Church, had his episcopal residence in Făgăraș between 1732–1737.
- Ioan Pușcariu, captain of Făgăraș.
- Aron Pumnul (1818–1866), scholar, linguist, philologist, literary historian, teacher of Mihai Eminescu, leader of the Revolution of 1848 in Transylvania.
- Nicolae Densușianu (1846–1911), historian, Associate member of the Romanian Academy.
- Aron Densușianu (1837–1900), poet and literary critic, Associate Member of the Romanian Academy.
- Badea Cârțan (Gheorghe Cârțan) (1848–1911), fighting for the independence of the Romanians in Transylvania.
- Ovid Densusianu (1873–1938), Aron Densușianu's son, philologist, linguist, folklorist, poet and academician, professor at the University of Bucharest.
- Johanna Korner who founded the Madame Korner cosmetic business in Australia was born here in 1891.
- Ștefan Câlția, painter (born in Brașov in 1942).
- Ion Gavrilă Ogoranu (1923–2006) member of the fascist paramilitary organization the Iron Guard, in the group of the Făgăraș Mountains, former student of the present Radu Negru National College, class of 1945.
- Octavian Paler (1926–2007), writer and publicist, former student of the present Radu Negru National College, class of 1945.
- Laurențiu (Liviu) Streza (born in 1947), Orthodox archbishop and metropolitan of Transylvania, former student of the present Radu Negru National College, class of 1965.
- Horia Sima (1906–1993), Co-Conducător of Romania in 1940–1941, and second leader of the Iron Guard. Former student of the present Radu Negru National College, class of 1926.
- Mircea Frățică (born in 1957) Judoka who won the European title in 1982, and bronze medals at the 1980 European Championships, 1983 World Championships and 1984 Olympics (Romania's first Olympic judo medalist).
- Nicușor Dan (born in 1969), mathematician, activist, and politician who served as Mayor of Bucharest, the capital city, from 2020 to 2025. On 18 May 2025, Dan was elected President of Romania.
- Mihail Neamțu (born 1978), writer and politician.
- Mircea Dincă (born 1980), chemist.
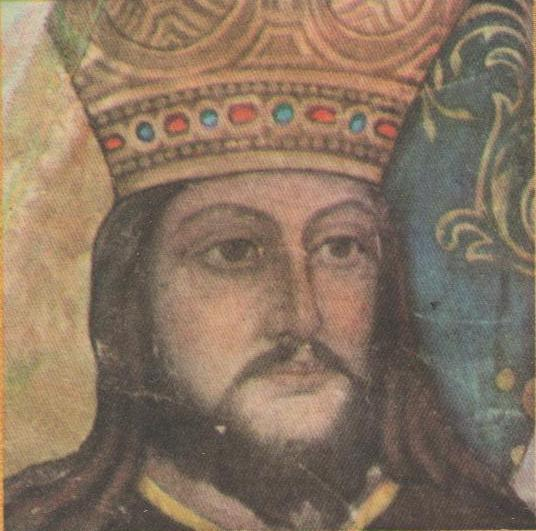
Negru-Vodă

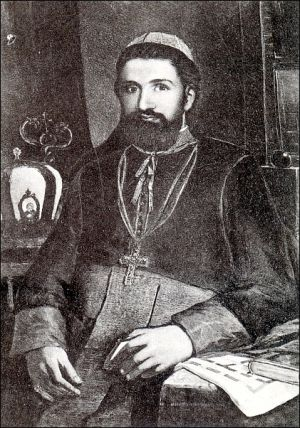
Inocențiu Micu-Klein

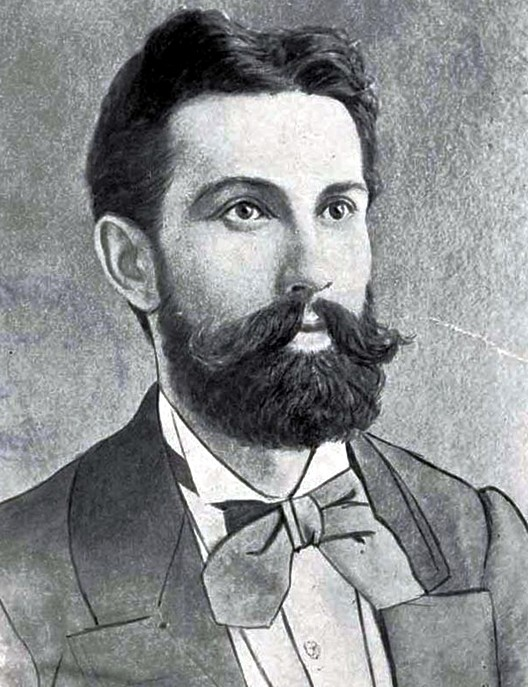
Nicolae Densușianu

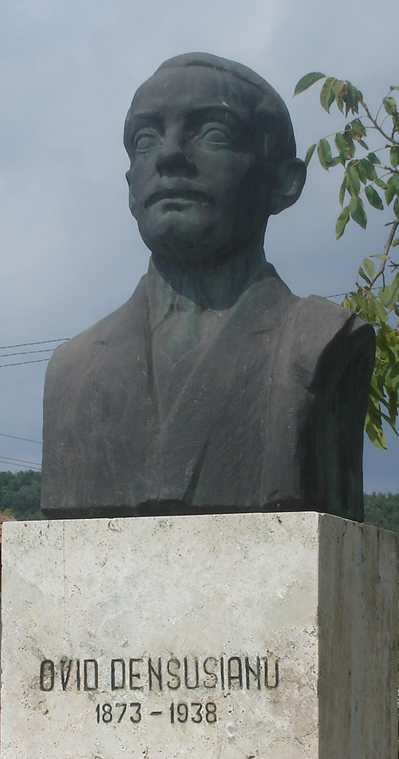
Ovid Densusianu

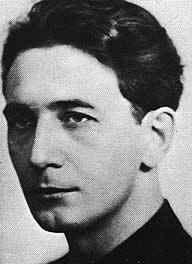
Horia Sima

== See also ==
- Făgăraș Mountains
- List of castles in Romania
- Tourism in Romania
- Villages with fortified churches in Transylvania
